= Vesper Lynd =

Fictional James Bond character

- James Bond character
- Eva Green as Vesper Lynd
- First appearance: Casino Royale (1953 novel)
- Last appearance: Casino Royale (2006 film)
- Created by: Ian Fleming
- Portrayed by: Ursula Andress (1967); Eva Green (2006)

In-universe information
- Gender: Female
- Occupation: Double agent
- Affiliation: Novel: MVD; MI6; Film: HM Treasury; Quantum
- Classification: Bond girl/Henchwoman

Vesper Lynd is a fictional character in Ian Fleming's 1953 James Bond novel Casino Royale. She was portrayed by Eva Green in the 2006 film adaptation and by Ursula Andress in the 1967 James Bond parody.

In the novel, the character explains that she was born "on a very stormy evening", and that her parents named her "Vesper", Latin for "evening" and James Bond then gives her name to a cocktail he has recently invented. The "Vesper" became popular after the novel's publication.

Vesper may have been inspired by:

- Larissa Swirski, a Ukrainian-Spanish double agent whom Fleming encountered during World War II.
- Polish agent Krystyna Skarbek seconded to Special Operations Executive during Flemming's WW II intelligence work, as reported by journalist Donald McCormick in 1993

== In novel ==
Vesper Lynd works at MI6 headquarters as a personal assistant to the Head of Section S. She is lent to Bond, much to his irritation, to assist him in his mission to bankrupt Le Chiffre, the paymaster of a SMERSH-controlled trade union. She poses as a radio seller, working with secret agent René Mathis, and later as Bond's companion to infiltrate the casino in Royale-Les-Eaux, where Le Chiffre frequently gambles. After Bond takes all of Le Chiffre's money in a high-stakes game of baccarat, Vesper is abducted by Le Chiffre's thugs, who also capture Bond when he tries to rescue her. Both are rescued after Le Chiffre is murdered by a SMERSH agent as punishment for losing the organization's money, but only after Le Chiffre has tortured Bond.

Vesper visits Bond every day in the hospital, and the two grow very close; much to his own surprise, Bond develops genuine feelings for her, and even dreams of leaving the service and marrying her. After he is released from the hospital, they go on a holiday together and eventually become lovers.

Vesper has a terrible secret, however – she is a double agent working for the Soviet Ministry of Internal Affairs (MVD) and worked with Bond only because she was ordered to lure him into a trap. (Her kidnapping was staged to lure Bond into Le Chiffre's clutches.) Before she met Bond, she had been romantically involved with a Polish RAF operative. This man had been captured by SMERSH and revealed information about Vesper under torture. Hence, SMERSH was using this operative to blackmail Vesper into helping them. After Le Chiffre's death, she tries to make a fresh start with Bond, but she realises this is impossible when she sees SMERSH operative Adolph Gettler tracking them. Consumed with guilt and certain that SMERSH will find and kill both of them, she dies by suicide, leaving a note admitting her treachery and pledging her love to Bond.

Bond deals with his grief over her death by denouncing her as a traitor and returning to work as though nothing has happened, coldly telling his superiors, "The bitch is dead now."

Later books in the series suggest, however, that Bond still has feelings for Vesper.

- On Her Majesty's Secret Service reveals that Bond makes an annual pilgrimage to Royale-Les-Eaux to visit her grave.
- In Diamonds Are Forever, Bond skips the song "La Vie En Rose" in Tiffany Case's hotel room "because it has memories for him"; a song closely associated with Vesper in Casino Royale.
- In Goldfinger, when Bond has been poisoned and believes he is about to enter heaven, he worries about how to introduce Tilly Masterton, who he believes has died along with him, to Vesper.

== In films ==
=== 1967 spoof ===
In the 1967 parodical version of Casino Royale, Lynd was portrayed by Ursula Andress, who had portrayed another Bond girl, Honey Ryder, in the 1962 film version of Dr. No.

In this version, which bore little resemblance to the novel, Vesper is depicted as a former secret agent who has since become a multi-millionaire with a penchant for wearing ridiculously extravagant outfits at her office ("because if I wore it in the street people might stare"). Bond (David Niven), now in the position of M (John Huston) at MI6, uses a discount for her past due taxes to bribe her into becoming another 007 agent, and to recruit baccarat expert Evelyn Tremble (Peter Sellers) into stopping Le Chiffre (Orson Welles).

Vesper and Tremble have an affair, during which she eliminates Miss Giovanna Goodthighs (Jacqueline Bisset), an enemy agent sent to seduce Tremble. Ultimately, however, she betrays Tremble to Le Chiffre and SMERSH, declaring to Tremble, "Never trust a rich spy" before killing him with a machine gun hidden inside a bagpipe. She presumably does this for the same reason she does in the novel, as she remarks that it isn't for money but for love. Though her ultimate fate is not revealed in the film, in the closing credits she is shown as an angel playing a harp, showing her to be one of the "seven James Bonds at Casino Royale" killed by an atomic explosion.

=== Eon films ===
In the 2006 film version of Casino Royale, Vesper Lynd (portrayed by Eva Green) is a foreign liaison agent from the HM Treasury's Financial Action Task Force assigned to make sure that James Bond (Daniel Craig), newly promoted to MI-6's 00 Section, adequately manages the funds provided by MI6 to bankrupt Le Chiffre (Mads Mikkelsen), a money manager for several terrorist groups. Upon meeting for the first time, Vesper and Bond size each other up, and both deduce that the other is an orphan. Vesper is initially skeptical about Bond's ego and at first is unwilling to pretend to be his girlfriend to distract the other players at the high-stakes Texas Hold 'Em poker tournament hosted by Le Chiffre. However, she assists Bond when Lord's Resistance Army leader Steven Obanno (Isaach de Bankolé) attacks him, knocking a gun out of Obanno's hand and giving Bond the chance to kill him and his bodyguards.

She retreats to the shower afterwards, wracked with guilt, feeling she has blood on her hands from helping to kill Obanno. Bond sits next to her in the shower and comforts her by kissing the "blood" off her fingers, and they return to the casino. His kindness does not prevent her from doing her job, however; she refuses to bankroll him after he loses his table stakes to Le Chiffre. Shortly afterwards, Vesper saves Bond's life when he is poisoned by Le Chiffre's girlfriend, Valenka (Ivana Miličević); Bond struggles unsuccessfully to connect a key wire to the defibrillator in his car and enters cardiac arrest, but Vesper arrives in time to connect the wire properly, enabling the machine to revive him.

After Bond wins the tournament, Le Chiffre kidnaps Vesper, and Bond gives chase. They fall into Le Chiffre's trap and are tortured by him and his thugs, but are saved by the mysterious Mr. White (Jesper Christensen), who shoots and kills Le Chiffre for losing his organisation's money.

While both are hospitalised to recover, Bond and Vesper fall in love, and Bond plans to resign from MI6 to be with her. As in the novel, Bond and Vesper go on vacation to Venice, both hoping to start a new life. Unbeknownst to Bond, however, Vesper embezzles the tournament winnings and intends to deliver them to Adolph Gettler (Richard Sammel), who (like his novel counterpart) has been spying on them since they arrived in Venice.

When Bond receives a timely phone call from MI6 chief M (Judi Dench) who tells him that the money was never deposited, he realizes Vesper’s betrayal and pursues her as Gettler takes her hostage and throws her in a caged elevator. Bond kills Gettler and his thugs, but in the process causes the building to flood and start sinking. After apologising to Bond, Vesper locks herself in the elevator just before it plunges into the waters below. Bond frantically tries to save her life, but in a final gesture, she kisses Bond's hands as if to absolve him of guilt and lets herself drown. Bond finally extricates her and unsuccessfully attempts to revive her.

As in the novel, Bond copes with Vesper's death by denouncing her as a traitor. M tells Bond that the organization behind Le Chiffre had kidnapped Vesper's boyfriend and threatened to kill him unless she became their spy. She then tells him that Vesper had made a deal with the kidnappers: the money in exchange for Bond's life. When Bond opens Vesper's mobile phone left in their Venice hotel room, he discovers her note for him with Mr. White's phone number, which enables Bond to track down and confront him at the film's end.

In the 2008 film Quantum of Solace, Vesper's boyfriend, Yusef Kabira (Simon Kassianides), is revealed to be an agent of Quantum, the terrorist organisation behind Le Chiffre and Mr. White. Kabira seduces high-ranking female intelligence agents, and is then "kidnapped" by Quantum, who threatens to kill him unless they become double agents. This information vindicates Vesper in Bond's eyes, as he realizes that her betrayal was not her fault. He does not kill Kabira, but leaves him to MI6 and tells M that she was right about Vesper. As Bond walks away, he drops Vesper's necklace in the snow.

In the 2015 film Spectre, following Mr. White's suicide, Bond finds a VHS videotape in his hotel room in Morocco labelled "Vesper Lynd Interrogation". Ernst Stavro Blofeld (Christoph Waltz), whose worldwide criminal organization SPECTRE is the power behind Quantum, gloats that he is indirectly responsible for Vesper's death.

At the beginning of the 2021 film No Time To Die, Bond and his lover Madeleine Swann (Léa Seydoux) are in Matera, and Swann suggests Bond should visit Vesper's grave so he can finally let her go. When he visits Vesper's grave (with the dates 1983–2006), he says "I miss you," and burns a note reading, "Forgive me".

=== Related character ===
The character of Vesper Lynd does not appear in the 1954 television adaptation of Casino Royale that aired as part of the series Climax!. Instead, the character was replaced by a new character named Valerie Mathis (Linda Christian), who is depicted as an American. She also betrays Bond (Barry Nelson), but comes to his rescue after he is shot by Le Chiffre (Peter Lorre). Valerie does not die in this adaptation.
