= Barry Nelson =

American actor (1917–2007)

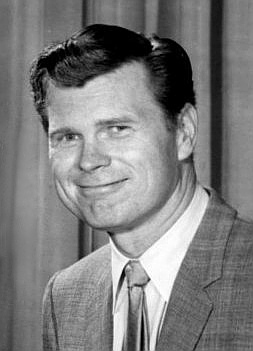
- Nelson in 1962
- Born: Robert Haakon Nielsen; April 16, 1917; San Francisco, California, U.S.
- Died: April 7, 2007 (aged 89); Bucks County, Pennsylvania, U.S.
- Education: University of California, Berkeley
- Occupation: Actor
- Years active: 1938–1990
- Spouses: Teresa Celli (m. 1951; div. 1965) Nansilee Hoy (m. 1992)

Robert Haakon Nielsen (April 16, 1917 – April 7, 2007), known as Barry Nelson, was an American stage, film, and television actor. He is noted as the first actor to portray Ian Fleming's secret agent James Bond, in the 1954 American television adaptation of Casino Royale. He is also known for playing Stuart Ullman in Stanley Kubrick's 1980 psychological horror film The Shining. He was nominated for a Tony Award for Best Actor in a Musical for the Broadway musical The Act (1977).

== Early life ==
Nelson was born in San Francisco, the son of Norwegian immigrants, Betsy (née Christophersen) and Trygve Nielsen. His year of birth has been subject to some debate, but is listed as 1917 on both his 1943 Army Air Forces enlistment record and his 1993 voter registration records. He attended high school in Oakland, California, having lead roles in school plays, and graduated from UC Berkeley in 1941, where he performed as an actor in student theatre productions. While there he earned part of his tuition expenses by acting on radio programs in San Francisco.

== Career ==
With MGM, Nelson made his screen debut in the role of Paul Clark in Shadow of the Thin Man (1941) starring William Powell and Myrna Loy, with Donna Reed. He followed that with his role as Lew Rankin in the film noir Johnny Eager (1942) starring Robert Taylor and Lana Turner.

During his service in the United States Army Air Forces during World War II, Nelson debuted on the Broadway stage in Moss Hart's play Winged Victory (1943) in the role of Bobby Grills. His next Broadway appearance was as Peter Sloan, playwright, in Hart's Light Up the Sky (1948). He appeared on Broadway with Barbara Bel Geddes in the original Broadway production of The Moon Is Blue. During the play's run, he also starred in a CBS half-hour drama called The Hunter, premiering in July 1952. He played Bart Adams, a wealthy young American whose business activities involved him in a series of adventures. He also appeared with Lauren Bacall in the Abe Burrows comedy Cactus Flower in 1965 and with Dorothy Loudon in The Fig Leaves Are Falling in 1969. Nelson performed another Broadway role, that of Gus Hammer in The Rat Race (1949).

He was the first actor to play James Bond on screen in a 1954 adaptation of Ian Fleming's novel Casino Royale on the television anthology series Climax! (preceding Sean Connery's interpretation in Dr. No by eight years). Reportedly this was considered a pilot for a possible James Bond television series, though it is not known if Nelson intended to continue playing the character. Nelson played James Bond as an American agent whom some in the program call "Jimmy". In 2004, Nelson said, "At that time, no one had ever heard of James Bond...I was scratching my head wondering how to play it. I hadn't read the book or anything like that because it wasn't well-known." Bond did not become well known in the U.S. until President John F. Kennedy listed From Russia, with Love among his 10 favorite books in a March 17, 1961, Life article.

The program also featured Peter Lorre as Le Chiffre, the primary villain. Nelson later noted the opportunity to work with Lorre was the reason he took the role. Originally broadcast live, the production was believed lost until a kinescope emerged in the 1980s. It was released to home video and is currently available on DVD as a bonus feature with the 1967 film adaptation of the novel.

During the 1959 television series, Nelson starred in 39 episodes of Hudson's Bay, playing Johnathon Banner.

Nelson appeared as Grant Decker in "Threat of Evil", a 1960 episode of The DuPont Show with June Allyson. His additional television credits include guest appearances on Alfred Hitchcock Presents, Ben Casey, The Twilight Zone (episode "Stopover in a Quiet Town"), Dr. Kildare, and in later years playing a hobo on an episode of The Ropers. He appeared regularly on television in the 1960s, having been one of the What's My Line? mystery guests and later serving as a guest panelist on that popular CBS quiz show. Nelson was also a semi-regular panelist on the daytime and nighttime versions of To Tell the Truth for three years of its run from 1962 to 1965, as well as a guest panelist a few times in 1967. Nelson appeared second-most-frequently on the daytime show in the three years he was a semi-regular. He was one of the various hosts of the NBC Radio program Monitor during the mid-1960s. Nelson appeared in both the stage and screen versions of Mary, Mary.

He directed the 1968 play The Only Game in Town, as well as starring as Joe. In 1978, he was nominated for a Tony Award for Best Actor in a Musical for his role as Dan Connors in the Broadway musical The Act (1977) with Liza Minnelli. Nelson had a notable role as Stuart Ullman, the manager of the Overlook Hotel, in the Stanley Kubrick horror film The Shining (1980). His final appearance on Broadway was as Julian Marsh in 42nd Street (1986).

"He was a very naturalistic, believable actor," said his agent, Francis Delduca. "He was good at both comedy and the serious stuff."

== Personal life ==
Nelson was married twice – first to actress Teresa Celli, from whom he was divorced in 1965 and later to Nansilee ("Nansi") Hoy, to whom he was married until his death.

Nelson and his second wife divided their time between homes in New York and France.

== Death ==
Nelson died on April 7, 2007, while traveling in Bucks County, Pennsylvania, nine days before his 90th birthday.

== Filmography ==
=== Film ===
Year	Title	Role	Notes
1938	Comet Over Broadway	Garage Mechanic	uncredited
1941	Shadow of the Thin Man	Paul Clark	
1941	Johnny Eager	Lew Rankin	
1942	A Yank on the Burma Road	Joe Tracey	
1942	Dr. Kildare's Victory	Samuel Z. Cutter	
1942	Rio Rita	Harry Gantley	
1942	The Affairs of Martha	Danny O'Brien	
1942	Eyes in the Night	Mr. Busch	
1943	The Human Comedy	Norman Dana (aka "Fat")	
1943	Bataan	F.X. Matowski	
1943	A Guy Named Joe	Dick Rumney	
1944	Winged Victory	Robert Edward "Bobby" Crills	
1947	The Beginning or the End	Colonel Paul Tibbetts Jr.	
1947	Undercover Maisie	Lieutenant Paul Scott	
1948	Tenth Avenue Angel	Al Parker	
1948	Command Decision	Cumquat B-Baker crewman	voice, uncredited
1951	The Man with My Face	Charles "Chick" Graham / Albert "Bert" Rand	
1956	The First Traveling Saleslady	Charles Masters	
1963	Mary, Mary	Bob McKellaway	
1967	The Borgia Stick	Hal Carter	TV movie
1969	Seven in Darkness	Alex Swain	TV movie
1970	Airport	Captain Anson Harris	
1971	My Wives Jane	Nat Franklin	TV movie
1972	Pete 'n' Tillie	Burt	
1972	Climb an Angry Mountain	Lieutenant Frank Bryant	TV movie
1974	Fools, Females and Fun	Dr. David Markham	TV movie
1980	The Shining	Stuart Ullman	
1980	Island Claws	Dr. McNeal	
1982	Poltergeist	Actor on television	uncredited final film role

=== Television ===
- Suspense – Episodes: "The Guy from Nowhere", "A Pocketful of Murder", "The Gentleman from America", "My Old Man's Badge" (1950); "Dead Fall", "Tough Cop" (1951)
- The Hunter – Bart Adams (1952)
- My Favorite Husband – George Cooper (1953–1955)
- Climax! – James Bond – Episode: "Casino Royale" (1954); Dick Milton – Episode: "The Push-Button Giant" (1958)
- Hudson's Bay – Jonathan Banner (1959)
- Alfred Hitchcock Presents (1959) (Season 4 Episode 27: "The Waxwork") – Raymond Houston
- The Twilight Zone (1964) (Episode: "Stopover in a Quiet Town") Bob Frazier
- The Alfred Hitchcock Hour (1964) (Season 2 Episode 20: "Anyone for Murder?") – Dr. James Parkerson
- The Alfred Hitchcock Hour (1964) (Season 3 Episode 8: "Misadventure") – Colin
- Thriller (1974) (Episode: "Ring Once for Death") - Hugo Fane
- Washington: Behind Closed Doors (1977) - Bob Bailey
- The Ropers (1979) (Episode: "The Skeleton") - Uncle Bill
- Taxi (1981) (Episode: "Mr. Personalities") - Dr. Jeffries
- Magnum, PI (1982) (Episode: "Double Jeopardy") - Knox
- Murder, She Wrote (1989) (Episode: "Mourning Among the Wisterias") – Eugene McClenden
