= Casino Royale (novel) =

1953 novel by Ian Fleming, the first James Bond book

- First edition cover, conceived by Fleming
- Author: Ian Fleming
- Series: James Bond
- Genre: Spy fiction
- Publisher: Jonathan Cape
- Publication date: 13 April 1953 (hardback)
- Publication place: United Kingdom
- Pages: 213
- Followed by: Live and Let Die

Casino Royale is the first novel by the British author Ian Fleming. Published in 1953, it is the first James Bond book, and it paved the way for a further eleven novels and two short story collections by Fleming, followed by numerous continuation Bond novels by other authors.

The story concerns the British secret agent James Bond, gambling at the casino in Royale-les-Eaux to try to bankrupt Le Chiffre, the treasurer of a French union and a member of the Soviet secret service. Bond is supported in his endeavours by Vesper Lynd, a member of his own service, as well as Felix Leiter of the CIA and René Mathis of the French Deuxième Bureau. Fleming used his wartime experiences as a member of the Naval Intelligence Division, and the people he met during his work, to provide plot elements; the character of Bond also reflected many of Fleming's personal tastes. Fleming wrote the draft in early 1952 at his Goldeneye estate in Jamaica while awaiting his marriage. He was initially unsure whether the work was suitable for publication, but was assured by his friend, the novelist William Plomer, that the novel had promise.

Within the spy storyline, Casino Royale deals with themes of Britain's position in the world, particularly the relationship with the US in light of the defections to the Soviet Union of the British agents Guy Burgess and Donald Maclean. The book was given broadly positive reviews by critics at the time and sold out in less than a month after its UK release on 13 April 1953, although US sales upon release a year later were much slower.

Since publication Casino Royale has appeared as a comic strip in The Daily Express, and been adapted for the screen three times: a 1954 episode of the CBS television series Climax! with Barry Nelson as an American Bond, a 1967 film version with David Niven playing "Sir James Bond", and a 2006 film in the Eon Productions film series starring Daniel Craig as James Bond.

== Plot ==
M, the Head of the British Secret Service, assigns James Bond, 007, to play against and bankrupt Le Chiffre, the paymaster for a SMERSH-controlled trade union, in a high-stakes baccarat game at the Royale-les-Eaux casino in northern France. As part of Bond's cover as a rich Jamaican playboy, M also assigns as his companion Vesper Lynd, personal assistant to the Head of Section S (Soviet Union). The CIA and the French Deuxième Bureau also send agents as observers. The game soon turns into an intense confrontation between Le Chiffre and Bond; Le Chiffre wins the first round, cleaning Bond out of his funds. As Bond contemplates the prospect of reporting his failure to M, the CIA agent, Felix Leiter, gives him an envelope of money and a note: "Marshall Aid. Thirty-two million francs. With the compliments of the USA." The game continues, despite the attempts of one of Le Chiffre's Soviet minders to kill Bond. Bond eventually wins, taking from Le Chiffre eighty million francs belonging to SMERSH.

Desperate to recover the money, Le Chiffre kidnaps Lynd and tortures Bond, threatening to kill them both if he does not get the money back. During the torture, a SMERSH assassin enters and kills Le Chiffre as punishment for losing the money. The agent does not kill Bond, saying that he has no orders to do so, but cuts a Cyrillic 'Ш' for шпион (shpión, Russian for spy) into Bond's hand so that future SMERSH agents will be able to identify him as such.

Lynd visits Bond every day as he recuperates in hospital, and he gradually realises that he loves her; he even contemplates leaving the Secret Service to settle down with her. When he is released from hospital they spend time together at a quiet guest house and eventually become lovers. One day they see a mysterious man named Gettler tracking their movements, which greatly distresses Lynd. The following morning, Bond finds that she has committed suicide. She leaves behind a note explaining that she had been working as an unwilling double agent for the Soviet Ministry of Internal Affairs. SMERSH had kidnapped her lover, a Polish Royal Air Force pilot, who had revealed information about her under torture; SMERSH then used that information to blackmail her into helping them undermine Bond's mission, including her own faked kidnapping. She had tried to start a new life with Bond, but upon seeing Gettler—a SMERSH agent—she realised that she would never be free of her tormentors, and that staying with Bond would only put him in danger. Bond informs his service of Lynd's duplicity, coldly telling his contact, "The bitch is dead now."

== Background ==
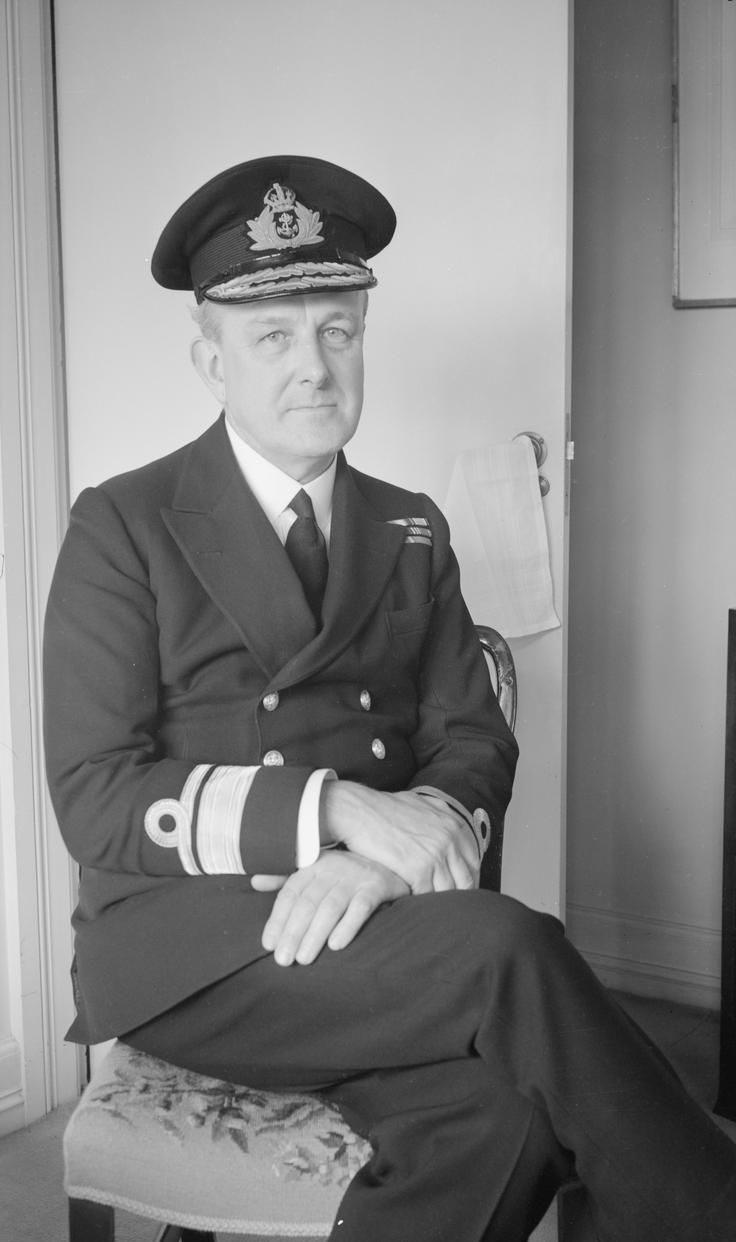
Rear Admiral John Henry Godfrey, Fleming's superior at the Naval Intelligence Division and a basis for the character M

Ian Fleming, born in 1908, was a son of Valentine Fleming, a wealthy banker and MP who died in action on the Western Front in May 1917. Educated at Eton, Sandhurst and, briefly, the universities of Munich and Geneva, Fleming moved through several jobs before he was recruited by Rear Admiral John Godfrey, the Director of Naval Intelligence, to become his personal assistant. Fleming joined the organisation full-time in August 1939, with the codename "17F", and worked for them throughout the war. Early in 1939 he began an affair with Ann O'Neill (née Charteris), who was married to the 3rd Baron O'Neill.

In 1942 Fleming attended an Anglo-American intelligence summit in Jamaica and, despite the constant heavy rain during his visit, he decided to live on the island once the war was over. His friend Ivar Bryce helped find a plot of land in Saint Mary Parish where, in 1945, Fleming had a house built, which he named Goldeneye. The name of the house and estate has many possible sources. Fleming mentioned both his wartime Operation Goldeneye and Carson McCullers' 1941 novel Reflections in a Golden Eye.

Upon Fleming's demobilisation in May 1945, he became the Foreign Manager in the Kemsley newspaper group, which at the time owned The Sunday Times. In this role he oversaw the paper's worldwide network of correspondents. His contract allowed him to take two months holiday every winter in Jamaica. In 1948 Charteris gave birth to Fleming's daughter, Mary, who was stillborn; Charteris and Fleming became engaged shortly in 1951.

Fleming had previously mentioned to friends that he wanted to write a spy novel, but it was not until early 1952, to distract himself from his forthcoming nuptials, that he began to write Casino Royale at his Goldeneye estate in Jamaica on 17 February; he typed out 2,000 words in the morning, directly from his own experiences and imagination, and finished work on the manuscript in March 1952. (Note: Sources differ on the end date of writing. Ian Fleming Publications state that it was "in not much more than two months", while the academic Jeremy Black writes that it was on 18 March 1952.) It was a pattern he retained for future Bond books. In May 1963 he wrote a piece for Books and Bookmen magazine in which he said: "I write for about three hours in the morning ... and I do another hour's work between six and seven in the evening. I never correct anything and I never go back to see what I have written ... By following my formula, you write 2,000 words a day."

Back in London, Fleming had his manuscript—which he described as his "dreadful oafish opus"—retyped by Joan Howe, his red-haired secretary at The Times on whom the character Miss Moneypenny was partly based. Clare Blanchard, a former girlfriend, advised him not to publish the book, or at least to do so under a pseudonym. During the book's final draft stages, Fleming allowed his friend, and later editor, William Plomer to see a copy, and remarked "I really am thoroughly ashamed of it ... after rifling through this muck you will probably never speak to me again, but I have got to take that chance." Despite this, Plomer thought the book had sufficient promise and sent a copy to the publishing house Jonathan Cape. At first they were unenthusiastic, but were persuaded to publish on the recommendation of Fleming's older brother, Peter, an established travel writer whose books they managed.

Although Fleming provided limited information regarding dates within his novels, two writers have identified different timelines based on events and situations within the novel series as a whole. John Griswold and Henry Chancellor—both of whom have written books on behalf of Ian Fleming Publications—put the events of Casino Royale in 1951; Griswold allows a possible second timeframe and considers the story could have taken place in either May to July 1951, or May to July 1952. Griswold noted that in Goldfinger, Fleming identifies that the events took place in 1951.

== Development ==
=== Plot inspirations ===
Casino Royale was inspired by certain incidents that took place during Fleming's wartime career at the Naval Intelligence Division (NID), or by events of which he was aware. On a trip to Portugal, en route to the United States, Fleming and the NID Director, Admiral Godfrey, went to the Estoril Casino. Because of Portugal's neutral status, Estoril's population had been swelled by spies and agents from the warring regimes. Fleming claimed that while there he was cleaned out by a "chief German agent" at a table playing chemin de fer. Godfrey told a different story: that Fleming only played Portuguese businessmen, and afterwards fantasised about playing against German agents.

The failed attempt to kill Bond at Royale-Les-Eaux was inspired by Fleming's knowledge of the attempted assassination of Franz von Papen, Vice-Chancellor of Germany and an ambassador under Hitler. Both Papen and Bond survived their assassination attempts, carried out by Bulgarians, because trees protected them from the blasts. Fleming also included four references in the novel to "Red Indians", including twice on the last page, which came from a unit of commandos, known as No. 30 Commando or 30 Assault Unit (30AU), composed of specialist intelligence troops. The unit was Fleming's idea, and he nicknamed the troops his "Red Indians", although they disliked the name.

=== Characters ===
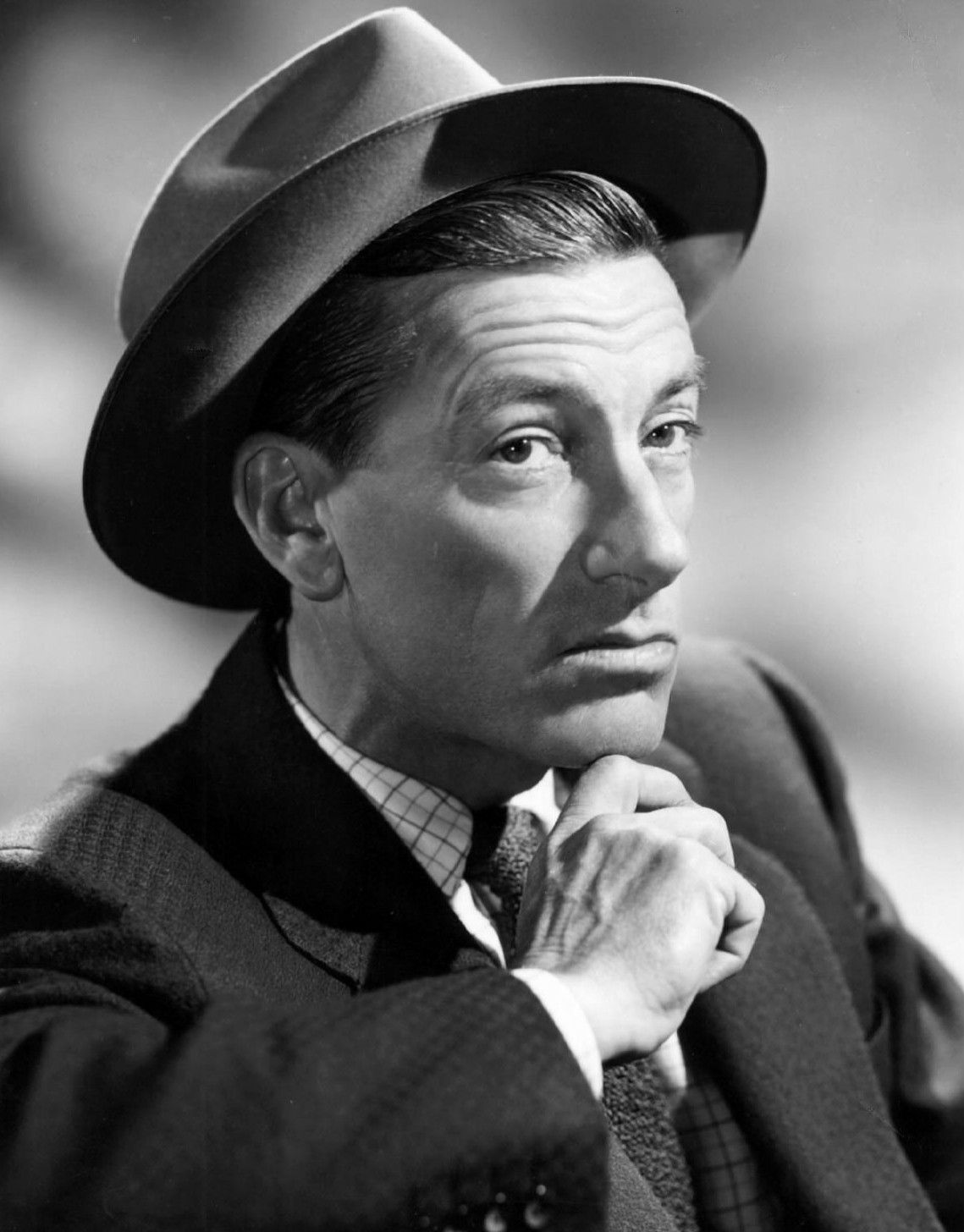
Hoagy Carmichael: Fleming's view of James Bond

The lead character of Casino Royale is James Bond, an agent of the Secret Service. Fleming initially named the character James Secretan before he appropriated the name of James Bond, author of the ornithology guide, Birds of the West Indies. Fleming explained to the ornithologist's wife "that this brief, unromantic, Anglo-Saxon and yet very masculine name was just what I needed, and so a second James Bond was born". He further explained that "When I wrote the first one in 1953, I wanted Bond to be an extremely dull, uninteresting man to whom things happened; I wanted him to be a blunt instrument ... when I was casting around for a name for my protagonist I thought by God, [James Bond] is the dullest name I ever heard."

Fleming decided that Bond should resemble both the American singer Hoagy Carmichael and himself, and in the novel Lynd remarks that "Bond reminds me rather of Hoagy Carmichael, but there is something cold and ruthless." According to Andrew Lycett, Fleming's biographer, "within the first few pages ... [Fleming] had introduced most of Bond's idiosyncrasies and trademarks", which included his looks, his Bentley and his smoking and drinking habits. The full details of Bond's martini were kept until chapter seven of the book and Bond eventually named it "The Vesper", after Lynd. Bond's order, to be served in a deep champagne goblet, was for "three measures of Gordon's, one of vodka, half a measure of Kina Lillet. Shake it very well until it's ice-cold, then add a large thin slice of lemon peel."

Speaking of Bond's origins, Fleming said that "he was a compound of all the secret agents and commando types I met during the war", although the author gave many of his own traits to the character. Bond's tastes are often taken from Fleming's own, as is some of his behaviour: Fleming used the casino to introduce Bond in his first novel because "skill at gambling and knowledge of how to behave in a casino were seen ... as attributes of a gentleman". Lycett sees much of Bond's character as being "wish fulfilment" by Fleming.

James Bond is the culmination of an important but much-maligned tradition in English literature. As a boy, Fleming devoured the Bulldog Drummond tales of Lieutenant Colonel Herman Cyril McNeile (aka "Sapper") and the Richard Hannay stories of John Buchan. His genius was to repackage these antiquated adventures to fit the fashion of postwar Britain ... In Bond, he created a Bulldog Drummond for the jet age.

— William Cook in New Statesman

Bond's superior, M, was largely based on Godfrey, Fleming's NID superior officer; Godfrey was known for his bellicose and irascible temperament. One of the likely models for Le Chiffre was the influential English occultist, astrologer, mystic and ceremonial magician Aleister Crowley, on whose physical features Fleming based Le Chiffre's. Crowley's tastes, especially in sado-masochism, were also ascribed to Le Chiffre; as Fleming's biographer Henry Chancellor notes, "when Le Chiffre goes to work on Bond's testicles with a carpet-beater and a carving knife, the sinister figure of Aleister Crowley is there lurking in the background."

== Style ==
Fleming later said of his work, "while thrillers may not be Literature with a capital L, it is possible to write what I can best describe as 'thrillers designed to be read as literature'". He used well-known brand names and everyday details to produce a sense of realism, which the author Kingsley Amis called "the Fleming effect". (Note: The "Fleming effect" was a mechanism he continued to use in future books; Rupert Hart-Davis, the publisher and editor who was a close friend of Peter Fleming, later remarked that "when Ian Fleming mentions any particular food, clothing or cigarettes in his books, the makers reward him with presents in kind ... Ian's are the only modern thrillers with built-in commercials.") Amis describes it as "the imaginative use of information, whereby the pervading fantastic nature of Bond's world ... [is] bolted down to some sort of reality, or at least counter-balanced." Within the text the novelist Raymond Benson—who later wrote a series of Bond novels—identifies what he described as the "Fleming Sweep", the use of "hooks" at the end of chapters to heighten tension and pull the reader into the next. The hooks combine with what the novelist Anthony Burgess calls "a heightened journalistic style" to produce "a speed of narrative, which hustles the reader past each danger point of mockery".

The semiotician and essayist, Umberto Eco, in his 1979 examination of the Bond books, "The Narrative Structure of Ian Fleming", considered that Fleming "has a rhythm, a polish, a certain sensuous feeling for words. That is not to say that Fleming is an artist; yet he writes with art." When examining the passage relating to the death of Le Chiffre, Eco wrote that "there is a ... baroque feeling for the image, a total adaptation of the image without emotional comment, and a use of words that designate things with accuracy", and he went on to conclude that "Fleming is more literate than he gives one to understand."

== Themes ==
Casino Royale was written after, and was heavily influenced by, the Second World War; Britain was still an imperial power, and the Western and Eastern blocs were engaged in the Cold War. The journalist William Cook observes that with the decline in power of the British Empire, "Bond pandered to Britain's inflated and increasingly insecure self-image, flattering us with the fantasy that Britannia could still punch above her weight." The cultural historians Janet Woollacott and Tony Bennett agree, and consider that "Bond embodied the imaginary possibility that England might once again be placed at the centre of world affairs during a period when its world power status was visibly and rapidly declining."

In 1953 parts of central London, including Oxford Street and High Holborn still had uncleared bomb sites and sweets had ceased being rationed, but coal and other food items were still regulated. According to The Times journalist and historian Ben Macintyre, Bond was "the ideal antidote to Britain's postwar austerity, rationing and the looming premonition of lost power".

Casino Royale deals with the question of Anglo-American relations, reflecting the real-world central role of the US in the defence of the West. The academic Jeremy Black points to the 1951 defections of two members of MI6—Guy Burgess and Donald Maclean—to the Soviet Union as having a major impact on how Britain was poorly viewed in US intelligence circles; Fleming was aware of this tension between the two countries, but he did not focus on it too strongly, and Bond and Leiter's warm relationship did not reflect the reality of the US-UK relationship.

Amis, in his exploration of Bond in The James Bond Dossier, pointed out that Leiter is "such a nonentity as a piece of characterization ... he, the American, takes orders from Bond, the Britisher, and that Bond is constantly doing better than he". The journalist and author Christopher Hitchens observed that "the central paradox of the classic Bond stories is that, although superficially devoted to the Anglo-American war against communism, they are full of contempt and resentment for America and Americans". David Seed, in his examination of spy fiction, disagrees, and writes that while Bond beats Le Chiffre, his "activities are constantly supported by American agencies, financing and know-how".

The treachery of Le Chiffre, with the overtones of a fifth column, struck a chord with the largely British readership as Communist influence in the trade unions had been an issue in the press and parliament at the time. Britain had also suffered from defections to the Soviet Union from two MI6 operatives who were part of the Cambridge Five spy ring that betrayed Western secrets to the Soviets. Thus Lycett observes that Casino Royale can be seen as Fleming's "attempt to reflect the disturbing moral ambiguity of a post-war world that could produce traitors like Burgess and Maclean". The journalist and writer Matthew Parker observes that with the defections of the two spies so recent to the publication, it was "perhaps the closest Fleming came to a [John] le Carré-style spy story". Chancellor sees the moral ambiguity of the Cold War reflected in the novel.

Benson considers the most obvious theme of the novel to be good versus evil. Parker agrees, and highlights a conversation between Bond and René Mathis in the chapter titled "The Nature of Evil", in which Bond says: "By ... [Le Chiffre's] evil existence ... he was creating a norm of badness by which, and by which alone, an opposite norm of goodness could exist." The subject was also dealt with by the academic Beth Butterfield, in an examination of Bond from an existentialist viewpoint. In light of Bond's conversation, Butterfield identifies a crisis of confidence in Bond's character, where he has "moved beyond good and evil" to the point where he does his job not because of principles, but to pursue personal battles. Eco comes to the same conclusion, stating that Bond "abandon[s] the treacherous life of moral mediation and of psychological anger, with all the dangers they entail."

Black also identifies a mechanism Fleming uses in Casino Royale—and in subsequent Bond novels—which is to use the evil of his opponents both as a justification of his actions, and as a device to foil their own plans. Black refers to the episode of the attempted assassination of Bond by Bulgarian assassins which results in their own deaths.

== Publication and reception ==
=== Publication history ===
"The scent and smoke and sweat of a casino are nauseating at three in the morning. Then the soul erosion produced by high gambling – a compost of greed and fear and nervous tension – becomes unbearable and the senses awake and revolt from it."

— Opening lines of Casino Royale

Casino Royale was first released on 13 April 1953 in the UK as a hardback edition by publishers Jonathan Cape, with a cover devised by Fleming. Cape printed 4,728 copies of Casino Royale, which sold out in less than a month; a second print run the same month also sold out, as did a third run of more than 8,000 books published in May 1954. The sales figures were strong enough for Cape to offer Fleming a three-book deal. In April 1955 Pan Books issued a paperback version and sold 41,000 copies in the first year.

In the US three publishers turned the book down before Macmillan Publishing Co offered Fleming a deal. Casino Royale was published on 23 March 1954 in the US, but sales were poor, totalling only 4,000 copies across the entire US during the course of the year. When the novel was released as a US paperback in 1955, it was re-titled by publisher American Popular Library; Fleming's suggestions for a new title, The Double-O Agent and The Deadly Gamble, were disregarded in favour of You Asked for It, but this marketing ploy failed to raise the interest. The Popular Library version also changed Bond's name, calling him "Jimmy Bond".

=== Critical reception ===
Hugh I'Anson Fausset, writing in The Manchester Guardian, thought that Casino Royale was "a first-rate thriller ... with a breathtaking plot". Although he considered the book to be "schoolboy stuff", he felt the novel was "galvanised into life by the hard brilliance of the telling". Alan Ross, writing in The Times Literary Supplement wrote that Casino Royale was "an extremely engaging affair", and that "the especial charm ... is the high poetry with which he invests the green baize lagoons of the casino tables". He concluded that the book was "both exciting and extremely civilized". Reviewing for The Listener, Simon Raven believed that Fleming was a "kind of supersonic John Buchan", but he was somewhat dismissive of the plot, observing that it is "a brilliant but improbable notion" that includes "a deal of champagne-drinking, bomb-throwing, relentless pitting of wits etc ... with a cretinous love-affair". Raven also dismissed Bond as an "infantile" creation, but did allow that "Fleming tells a good story with strength and distinction ... his creation of a scene, both visually and emotionally, is of a very high order indeed."

John Betjeman, writing in The Daily Telegraph, considered that "Ian Fleming has discovered the secret of the narrative art ... which is to work up to a climax unrevealed at the end of each chapter. Thus the reader has to go on reading". Publishers Jonathan Cape included many of the reviews on their advertisements for the book, which appeared in a number of national newspapers; the reviews included those from The Sunday Times, which concluded that Fleming was "the best new English thriller-writer since [Eric] Ambler" and The Observer, which advised their readers: "don't miss this".

The critic for Time magazine examined Raymond Chandler's The Long Goodbye alongside Casino Royale; he praised Casino Royale, saying that "Fleming keeps his incidents and characters spinning through their paces like juggling balls." The Time reviewer went on to say that "As for Bond, he might be [Philip] Marlowe's younger brother except that he never takes coffee for a bracer, just one large Martini laced with vodka."

Writing for The New York Times, Anthony Boucher wrote that the book belongs "pretty much to the private-eye school" of fiction. He praised the first part, saying that Fleming "manages to make baccarat clear even to one who's never played it and produced as exciting a gambling sequence as I've ever read. But then he decides to pad out the book to novel length and leads the weary reader through a set of tough clichés to an ending which surprises nobody save Operative 007. You should certainly begin this book; but you might as well stop when the baccarat game is over."

== Adaptations ==
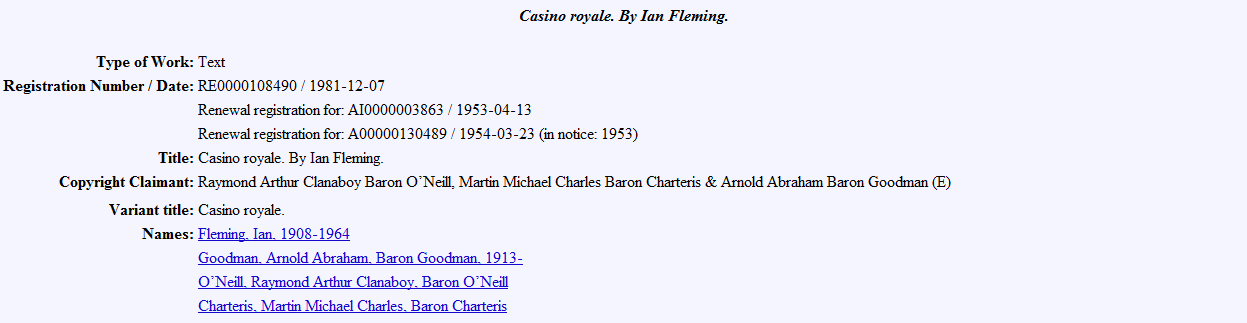
Copyright renewal registration for Casino Royale in the US

In 1954 CBS paid Ian Fleming $1,000 to adapt Casino Royale into a one-hour television adventure as part of its Climax! series. (Note: $1,000 in 1954 is approximately $8,400 in 2015.) The episode aired live on 21 October 1954 and starred Barry Nelson as secret agent "Card Sense" James 'Jimmy' Bond and Peter Lorre as Le Chiffre. A brief tutorial on baccarat is given at the beginning of the show by the presenter of the programme, William Lundigan, to enable viewers to understand a game which was not popular in America at the time. For this Americanised version of the story, Bond is an American agent, described as working for "Combined Intelligence", while the character Leiter from the original novel is British, renamed "Clarence Leiter". The agent for Station S., Mathis, does not appear as such; his surname is given to the leading lady, named Valérie Mathis instead of Vesper Lynd.

In March 1955 Ian Fleming sold the film rights of Casino Royale to the producer Gregory Ratoff for $6,000. (Note: $6,000 in 1955 is approximately $52,800 in 2015.) After Ratoff's death, producer Charles K. Feldman represented Ratoff's widow and obtained the rights to make a film version. Feldman decided the best way to profit from the film rights was to make a satirical version, which was produced and released in 1967 by Columbia Pictures. The film, which cast David Niven as Bond, was made with five credited directors (plus one uncredited) and a cast that included Peter Sellers, Ursula Andress, Orson Welles and Woody Allen. The 1967 version is described by the British Film Institute as "an incoherent all-star comedy".

Casino Royale was the first James Bond novel to be adapted as a daily comic strip; it was published in The Daily Express and syndicated worldwide. The strip ran from 7 July 1958 to 13 December 1958, and was written by Anthony Hern and illustrated by John McLusky. To aid The Daily Express in illustrating Bond, Fleming commissioned an artist to create a sketch of what he believed James Bond to look like. McLusky felt that Fleming's 007 looked too "outdated" and "pre-war" and changed Bond to give him a more masculine look. A graphic novel adaptation of the book was released by Dynamite Entertainment in April 2018, written by Van Jensen and illustrated by Dennis Calero.

Following the 1967 adaptation, the rights to the film remained with Columbia Pictures until 1989 when the studio, and the rights to their intellectual property portfolio was acquired by the Japanese company Sony. In 1999, following legal action between Sony Pictures Entertainment and MGM/UA, Sony traded the rights to Casino Royale for MGM's partial-rights to Spider-Man. This led to Eon Productions making the 2006 film Casino Royale. The film stars Daniel Craig as Bond, supported by Eva Green as Vesper Lynd and Mads Mikkelsen as Le Chiffre; Judi Dench returned for her fifth Bond film as Bond's superior, M. Casino Royale is a reboot, showing Bond at the beginning of his career as a 00-agent, and overall stays true to the original novel. (Note: A prequel novel to Casino Royale, which also involves Bond before getting his 00 licence, was released in 2018 written by Anthony Horowitz.)

== Notes and references ==
=== Sources ===
- Amis, Kingsley (1966). The James Bond Dossier. London: Pan Books. OCLC 154139618.
- Barnes, Alan; Hearn, Marcus (2001). Kiss Kiss Bang! Bang!: the Unofficial James Bond Film Companion. London: Batsford Books. ISBN 978-0-7134-8182-2.
- Bennett, Tony; Woollacott, Janet (1987). Bond and Beyond: The Political Career of a Popular Hero. London: Routledge. ISBN 978-0-416-01361-0.
- Bennett, Tony; Woollacott, Janet (2003). "The Moments of Bond". In Lindner, Christoph (ed.). The James Bond Phenomenon: a Critical Reader. Manchester: Manchester University Press. ISBN 978-0-7190-6541-5.
- Benson, Raymond (1988). The James Bond Bedside Companion. London: Boxtree Ltd. ISBN 978-1-85283-233-9.
- Black, Jeremy (2005). The Politics of James Bond: from Fleming's Novel to the Big Screen. Lincoln, NE: University of Nebraska Press. ISBN 978-0-8032-6240-9. Archived from the original on 23 March 2023.
- Burgess, Anthony (1984). 99 Novels. The Best in English Since 1939: A Personal Choice. London: Summit Books. ISBN 978-0-671-52407-4.
- Butler, William Vivian (1973). The Durable Desperadoes. London: Macmillan. ISBN 978-0-333-14217-2.
- Butterfield, Beth (2006). "Being-Towards-Death and Taking Pleasure in Beauty: James Bond and Existentialism". In Held, Jacob M.; South, James (eds.). James Bond and Philosophy: Questions are Forever. Chicago, IL: Open Court Publishing. ISBN 978-0-8126-9607-3. Archived from the original on 10 April 2023.
- Chancellor, Henry (2005). James Bond: The Man and His World. London: John Murray. ISBN 978-0-7195-6815-2.
- Davis, Mark (2010). Legal Issues in the Music Industry. Shreveport, LA: BuzzGig LLC. ISBN 978-0-615-33686-2.
- Eco, Umberto (2009). "The Narrative Structure of Ian Fleming". In Lindner, Christoph (ed.). The James Bond Phenomenon: a Critical Reader. Manchester: Manchester University Press. ISBN 978-0-7190-6541-5.
- Faulks, Sebastian; Fleming, Ian (2009). Devil May Care. London: Penguin Books. ISBN 978-0-14-103545-1.
- Fleming, Ian (2006) [1953]. Casino Royale. London: Penguin Books. ISBN 978-0-14-102830-9.
- Fleming, Ian; Gammidge, Henry; McLusky, John (1988). Octopussy. London: Titan Books. ISBN 978-1-85286-040-0.
- Gant, Richard (1966). Ian Fleming: Man with the Golden Pen. London: Mayflower-Dell. OCLC 487676374.
- Griswold, John (2006). Ian Fleming's James Bond: Annotations And Chronologies for Ian Fleming's Bond Stories. Bloomington, IN: AuthorHouse. ISBN 978-1-4259-3100-1. Archived from the original on 10 April 2023.
- Kerr, Sheila (January 2011). "Burgess, Guy Francis de Moncy (1911–1963)". Oxford Dictionary of National Biography (online ed.). Oxford University Press. doi:10.1093/ref:odnb/37244. (Subscription, Wikipedia Library access or UK public library membership required.)
- Lindner, Christoph (2009). The James Bond Phenomenon: a Critical Reader. Manchester: Manchester University Press. ISBN 978-0-7190-6541-5. Archived from the original on 10 April 2023.
- Lycett, Andrew (1996). Ian Fleming. London: Phoenix. ISBN 978-1-85799-783-5.
- Lycett, Andrew (2004). "Fleming, Ian Lancaster (1908–1964)". Oxford Dictionary of National Biography. Vol. 1 (online ed.). Oxford University Press. doi:10.1093/ref:odnb/33168. (Subscription, Wikipedia Library access or UK public library membership required.)
- Lycett, Andrew (2004). "Fleming, Ann Geraldine Mary [other married names Ann Geraldine Mary O'Neill, Lady O'Neill; Ann Geraldine Mary Harmsworth, Viscountess Rothermere] (1913–1981)". Oxford Dictionary of National Biography (online ed.). Oxford University Press. doi:10.1093/ref:odnb/40227. (Subscription, Wikipedia Library access or UK public library membership required.) (subscription, Wikipedia Library access or UK public library membership required)
- Lyttelton, George; Hart-Davis, Rupert (1979). Lyttelton–Hart-Davis Letters. Vol. 2. London: John Murray. ISBN 978-0-7195-3673-1.
- Macintyre, Ben (2008). For Your Eyes Only. London: Bloomsbury Publishing. ISBN 978-0-7475-9527-4.
- MacLean, Rory (2012). Gift of Time. London: Constable & Robinson. ISBN 978-1-84901-857-9.
- Nudd, John (October 1989). "Ian Fleming & James Bond". The Book and Magazine Collector (67).
- Parker, Matthew (2014). Goldeneye. London: Hutchinson. ISBN 978-0-09-195410-9.
- Pearson, John (1967). The Life of Ian Fleming: Creator of James Bond. London: Pan Books.
- Pfeiffer, Lee; Worrall, Dave (1998). The Essential Bond. London: Boxtree Ltd. ISBN 978-0-7522-2477-0.
- Rankin, Nicholas (2011). Ian Fleming's Commandos: The Story of 30 Assault Unit in WWII. London: Faber and Faber. ISBN 978-0-571-25062-2.
- Seed, David (2003). "Spy Fiction". In Priestman, Martin (ed.). The Cambridge Companion to Crime Fiction. Cambridge: Cambridge University Press. ISBN 978-0-521-00871-6.
- Simpson, Paul (2002). The Rough Guide to James Bond. London: Rough Guides. ISBN 978-1-84353-142-5. Archived from the original on 23 March 2023.
- Upton, John (August 1987). "The James Bond Books of Ian Fleming". The Book and Magazine Collector (41).
