= Royale-les-Eaux =

Fictional French town in James Bond novels

Royale-les-Eaux is a fictional town in northern France. It features in the James Bond novels of Ian Fleming and others, particularly Casino Royale (1953) and On Her Majesty's Secret Service (1963).

== Location ==
Royale-les-Eaux is a seaside resort, described in Casino Royale as being "just north of Dieppe" and lying "near the mouth of the Somme before the flat coastline soars up from the beaches of southern Picardy to the Normandy cliffs which run on to Le Havre". This would seem to place the town in the département of Somme, which takes its name from the river, but a telegram addressed to Bond in the same novel gives the département as the more southerly Seine-Inférieure (which was renamed Seine-Maritime on 18 January 1955). References in On Her Majesty's Secret Service suggest yet another département: when driving northwards along the N1 (now the D901), James Bond passes a Michelin road sign saying "Montreuil 5, Royale-les-Eaux 10, Le Touquet-Paris-Plage 15". After passing through Montreuil and over the Étaples-Paris railway just to the north of the town, the turning for Royale-les-Eaux is on the left. This would put Royale-les-Eaux on the coast just south of Le Touquet, perhaps in the vicinity of Stella-Plage, and in the département of Pas-de-Calais, to the north of Somme.

Some sources identify it with Deauville, other with Le Touquet.

== History ==
The town's fictional history is outlined in Casino Royale. Formerly just a small fishing village named "Royale", it rapidly became fashionable as a tourist destination during the Second Empire. However the subsequent rise in popularity of Le Touquet meant a loss in custom for Royale. A parallel is drawn between the history of Royale and that of Trouville, a once-popular destination which was eclipsed by Deauville. The fortunes of Royale seemed to be recovering at the turn of the 20th century, when a spring in the hills behind the town was found to contain enough sulphur to make it marketable as mineral water. Royale reinvented itself as a spa town, renamed itself "Royale-les-Eaux" and began exporting "Eau Royale", in a torpedo-shaped bottle. This success was short-lived, and following lawsuits from Vichy, Perrier and Vittel sale of Eau Royale became merely local once more. The town thereafter survived on seaside holidaymakers in the summer and its small fishing fleet in the winter, as well as "the crumbs which fell to its elegantly dilapidated Casino from the table at Le Touquet".

Royale's renaissance came after the Second World War. Encouraged by the post-war revival of Brighton and Nice, in 1950 Royale-les-Eaux was identified as a potential source of revenue by a Paris syndicate which invested funds on behalf of exiled Vichyites. The Casino, the public gardens and the two main hotels were refurbished and Paris jewellers and couturiers were given rent-free sites on which to establish branches. For the year in which the events of Casino Royale take place, the Société des Bains de Mer de Royale has succeeded in securing bookings from "a considerable number of the biggest operators in America and Europe", and leased some of the baccarat tables to a group of Egyptians, the Mahomet Ali Syndicate. This is the context in which Casino Royale opens.

== In film ==
The 2006 film adaptation completely changed the location of the plot, setting the action in Montenegro.

Without the connection to Royale-les-Eaux, the title Casino Royale is incorrect, "le Casino" being masculine, so "Casino Royal" would be more correct.
