= Casino Royale (Climax!) =

- Climax! episode
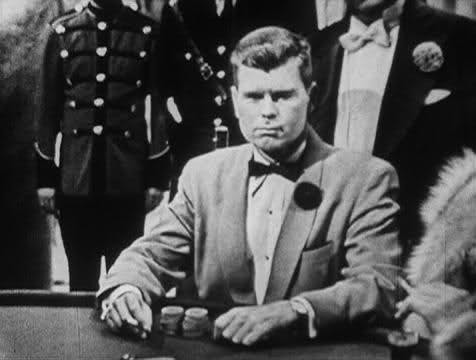
- Barry Nelson as James Bond
- Episode no.: Season 1 Episode 3
- Directed by: William H. Brown Jr.
- Written by: Antony Ellis; Charles Bennett
- Based on: Casino Royale by Ian Fleming
- Presented by: William Lundigan
- Original air date: October 21, 1954
- Running time: 50 minutes

Guest appearances
- Barry Nelson as James "Jimmy" Bond; Peter Lorre as Le Chiffre; Linda Christian as Valerie Mathis; Michael Pate as Clarence Leiter

Episode chronology
← Previous "The Thirteenth Chair"	Next → "Sorry, Wrong Number"

"Casino Royale" is a live 1954 television adaptation of the 1953 novel by Ian Fleming. An episode of the American dramatic anthology series Climax!, the show was the first screen adaptation of a James Bond novel, and stars Barry Nelson, Peter Lorre, Linda Christian, and Michael Pate. Though the lead character is based on the literary Bond, Nelson's character is played as an American spy working for the "Combined Intelligence Agency" rather than as British and working for the United Kingdom′s foreign intelligence service, MI6.

The dramatization was largely forgotten for decades until a mostly complete copy was located by film historian Jim Schoenberger in 1981. The conclusion and credits were found later. Both copies are black and white kinescopes, but the original live broadcast was in color. The episode has since lapsed into the public domain in the United States and countries that apply the rule of the shorter term due to not having its copyright renewed.

== Plot ==
"Combined Intelligence" agent James Bond comes under fire from an assassin. He dodges the bullets and enters Casino Royale. There he meets his British contact, Clarence Leiter, who remembers "Card Sense Jimmy Bond" from when he played the Maharajah at Deauville. While Bond explains the rules of baccarat, Leiter explains Bond's mission: to defeat Le Chiffre at baccarat and force his Soviet spymasters to "retire" him. Bond then encounters a former lover, Valerie Mathis, who is Le Chiffre's current girlfriend; he also meets Le Chiffre himself.

Bond beats Le Chiffre at baccarat, but when he returns to his hotel room, is confronted by Le Chiffre and his bodyguards, along with Mathis, who Le Chiffre has discovered is an agent of the Deuxième Bureau, France's external military intelligence agency at the time.

Le Chiffre tortures Bond in order to find out where Bond has hidden the check for his winnings, but Bond does not reveal where it is. After a fight between Bond and Le Chiffre's guards, Bond shoots and wounds Le Chiffre, saving Valerie in the process. Exhausted, Bond sits in a chair opposite Le Chiffre to talk. Mathis gets in between them, and Le Chiffre grabs her from behind, threatening her with a concealed razor blade. As Le Chiffre moves towards the door with Mathis as a shield, she struggles, breaking free slightly, and Bond is able to shoot Le Chiffre.

== Cast ==
- Barry Nelson as James Bond
- Peter Lorre as Le Chiffre
- Linda Christian as Valerie Mathis (a composite character of Vesper Lynd and René Mathis)
- William Lundigan as Host/Himself
- Michael Pate as Clarence Leiter
- Eugene Borden as Chef De Partie
- Jean Del Val as Croupier
- Gene Roth as Basil
- Kurt Katch as Zoltan
- Herman Belmonte as Doorman

== Production ==
In 1954, CBS paid the author Ian Fleming $1,000 ($11,989 in 2025 dollars) to adapt his first novel, Casino Royale, into a one-hour television adventure as part of their dramatic anthology series Climax!, which ran between October 1954 and June 1958. It was adapted for the screen by Antony Ellis and Charles Bennett; Bennett was best known for his collaborations with Alfred Hitchcock, including The 39 Steps and Sabotage. Due to the restriction of a one-hour play, the adapted version lost many of the details found in the book, although it retained its violence, particularly in Act III.

The hour-long Casino Royale episode aired on October 21, 1954, as a live production and starred Barry Nelson as secret agent James Bond, with Peter Lorre in the role of Le Chiffre, and was hosted by William Lundigan. The Bond character from Casino Royale was re-cast as an American agent, described as working for "Combined Intelligence" and supported by the British agent Clarence Leiter; "thus was the Anglo-American relationship depicted in the book reversed for American consumption".

Clarence Leiter was an agent for Station S, while being a combination of Felix Leiter and René Mathis. The name "Mathis", and his association with the Deuxième Bureau, was given to the leading lady, who is named Valérie Mathis, instead of Vesper Lynd. Reports that toward the end of the broadcast "the coast-to-coast audience saw Peter Lorre, the actor playing Le Chiffre, get up off the floor after his death and begin to walk to his dressing room", do not appear to be accurate.

== Legacy ==
In 1958, four years after the production of Casino Royale, CBS invited Fleming to write 32 episodes over a two-year period for a television show based on the Bond character. Fleming agreed and began to write outlines for this series. When nothing ever came of this, however, Fleming adapted three of the outlines into short stories and released the 1960 anthology For Your Eyes Only along with an additional two new short stories.

This was the first screen adaptation of a Bond novel and was made before the formation of Eon Productions. When MGM eventually obtained the rights to the 1967 film version of Casino Royale, it also received the rights to this television episode.

The Casino Royale episode was lost for decades after its 1954 broadcast until a black and white kinescope of the live broadcast was located by film historian Jim Schoenberger in 1981. The episode aired on TBS as part of a Bond film marathon. The original 1954 broadcast had been in color, and the VHS release and TBS presentation did not include the last two minutes, which were at that point still lost. Eventually, the missing footage (minus the last seconds of the end credits) was found and included on a Spy Guise & Cara Entertainment VHS release. MGM subsequently included the incomplete version on its first DVD release of the 1967 film Casino Royale.

David Cornelius of Efilmcritic.com remarked that "the first act freely gives in to spy pulp cliché" and noted that he believed Nelson was miscast and "trips over his lines and lacks the elegance needed for the role." He described Lorre as "the real main attraction here, the veteran villain working at full weasel mode; a grotesque weasel whose very presence makes you uncomfortable." Peter Debruge of Variety also praised Lorre, considering him the source of "whatever charm this slipshod antecedent to the Bond oeuvre has to offer", and complaining that "the whole thing seems to have been done on the cheap". Debruge still noted that while the special had very few elements in common with the Eon series, Nelson's portrayal of "Bond suggests a realistically human vulnerability that wouldn't resurface until Eon finally remade Casino Royale more than half a century later."

== See also ==
- James Bond novels
- Outline of James Bond

== Bibliography ==
- Andreychuk, Ed (2010). Louis L'Amour on Film and Television. McFarland. ISBN 978-0-7864-3336-0.
- Benson, Raymond (1988). The James Bond Bedside Companion. London: Boxtree Ltd. ISBN 978-0-88365-705-8.
- Black, Jeremy (2005). The Politics of James Bond: from Fleming's Novel to the Big Screen. University of Nebraska Press. ISBN 978-0-8032-6240-9.
- Britton, Wesley Alan (2004). Spy television (2 ed.). Greenwood Publishing Group. ISBN 978-0-275-98163-1.
- Lindner, Christoph (2009). The James Bond Phenomenon: a Critical Reader (2 ed.). Manchester University Press. ISBN 978-0-7190-8095-1.
- Lycett, Andrew (1996). Ian Fleming. London: Phoenix. ISBN 978-1-85799-783-5.
- Pearson, John (1967). The Life of Ian Fleming: Creator of James Bond. London: Jonathan Cape.
- Rubin, Steven Jay (2002). The James Bond films: a behind the scenes history. Westport, Conn: Arlington House. ISBN 978-0-87000-523-7.
