= Le Chiffre =

Fictional James Bond villain

- James Bond character
- Mads Mikkelsen as Le Chiffre in the 2006 film Casino Royale
- First appearance: Casino Royale (1953 novel)
- Last appearance: Casino Royale (2006 film)
- Created by: Ian Fleming
- Portrayed by: Peter Lorre (1954); Orson Welles (1967); Mads Mikkelsen (2006)

In-universe information
- Full name: Jean Duran (video game)
- Gender: Male
- Occupation: Paymaster for the Syndicat des Ouvriers d'Alsace (novel); Terrorist banker (film)
- Affiliation: Soviet Union (TV); SMERSH (novel; 1967 film); Spectre (revealed in Spectre); Quantum (2006 film)
- Nationality: Stateless (novel); Albanian (2006 film)
- Classification: Villain
- Henchmen: Valenka

Le Chiffre (French: [lə ʃifʁ], 'The Cypher' or 'The Digit') is a fictional character and the main antagonist of Ian Fleming's 1953 James Bond novel, Casino Royale. On screen Le Chiffre has been portrayed by Peter Lorre in the 1954 television adaptation of the novel for CBS's Climax! anthology television series, by Orson Welles in the 1967 spoof of the novel and Bond film series, and by Mads Mikkelsen in the 2006 film version of Fleming's novel where he is one of two main antagonists, the other being Mr. White (Jesper Christensen).

Fleming based the character on occultist Aleister Crowley.

== Novel ==
In the 1953 novel Casino Royale, Le Chiffre, alias "Die Nummer", "Mr. Number", "Herr Ziffer" and other translations of "The Number", "The Numeral", "The Figure", "The Cipher", or "The Code" in various languages, is the paymaster of the "Syndicat des Ouvriers d'Alsace" (French for "Alsatian Workmen's Union"), a SMERSH-controlled trade union.

He is first encountered as an inmate of the Dachau displaced persons camp in the US zone of Allied-occupied Germany in June 1945, where he displayed (possibly simulated) mutism and amnesia. He gained back speech capability and was transferred to Alsace-Lorraine and Strasbourg (due to some mention he made of them) three months later on a stateless passport. There he adopts the name Le Chiffre because as he claims, he is "only a number on a passport". Not much else is really known about Le Chiffre's background or where he comes from, except for educated guesses based on his description:

Height 1,73 m [5 ft 8 in]. Weight 114,3 kg [252 lb]. Complexion very pale. Clean-shaven. Hair red-brown, 'en brosse.' Eyes very dark brown with whites showing all round iris. Small, rather feminine mouth. False teeth of expensive quality. Ears small, with large lobes, indicating some Jewish blood. Hands small, well-tended, hirsute. Feet small. Racially, subject is probably a mixture of Mediterranean with Prussian or Polish strains. Dresses well and meticulously, generally in dark double-breasted suits. Smokes incessantly Caporals, using a denicotinizing holder. At frequent intervals inhales from benzedrine inhaler. Voice soft and even. Bilingual in French and English. Good German. Traces of Marseillais accent. Smiles infrequently. Does not laugh. Habits: Mostly expensive, but discreet. Large sexual appetites. Flagellant. Expert driver of fast cars. Adept with small arms and other forms of personal combat, including knives. Carries three Eversharp razor blades, in hatband, heel of left shoe, and cigarette case. Knowledge of accountancy and mathematics. Fine gambler.

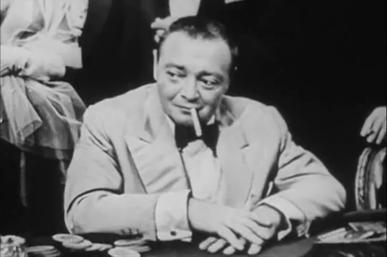
Peter Lorre as Le Chiffre in the 1954 TV adaption of Casino Royale.

In the novel, he serves as the paymaster for the Syndicat des Ouvriers d'Alsace, an important Communist trade union in Alsace. MI6 also believes the union would serve as a fifth column in the event of a Third World War between NATO and the Eastern Bloc, capable to mobilizing its 50,000 members to seize control of a substantial portion of the French–West German borderlands. He makes a major investment in the Cordon Jaune string of brothels with 50 million francs in subsidies belonging to SMERSH. The investment fails after the Loi Marthe Richard is signed into law banning prostitution in France. Le Chiffre then goes to the casino Royale-les-Eaux with the union's remaining 25 million francs in funds in an attempt to replace his lost money before the Soviet government notices.

MI6 sends James Bond, an expert baccarat player, to the casino to bankrupt Le Chiffre and force him to take refuge with the British government and inform on SMERSH. Bond bests Le Chiffre in a game of Chemin de Fer, taking all of his money. Le Chiffre kidnaps Bond's love interest, Vesper Lynd, to lure Bond into a trap and get back his money. The trap works, and Le Chiffre tortures Bond by beating his genitals with a carpet-beater to get him to give up the money. He is interrupted by a SMERSH agent, however, who shoots him between the eyes with a silenced TT pistol as punishment for losing the money.

The French press reports that Le Chiffre committed suicide, throwing the French Communist Party into disarray after Maurice Thorez's stroke. Le Chiffre's union is also bankrupted. These events are seen by the Soviet Union as an embarrassment, which in addition to the death and defeat of Mr. Big in Live and Let Die, leads to the events of From Russia, with Love.

=== Novel henchmen ===
- Basil – bodyguard and martial arts expert who takes pleasure in roughing up Bond. He is later killed by a SMERSH agent.
- Kratt – Le Chiffre's Corsican bodyguard who wields a walking-stick gun with which he threatens to cripple Bond at the gaming table. He is later killed by a SMERSH agent.

== 1967 film ==
Orson Welles as Le Chiffre in the 1967 film Casino Royale.

Le Chiffre (Orson Welles) is a secondary villain in the 1967 satire Casino Royale and appears in one of the few segments of the film actually adapted from Ian Fleming's book. As in the novel, Le Chiffre is charged with recovering a large sum of money for SMERSH after he loses it at the baccarat table. He first attempts to raise the funds by holding an auction of embarrassing photographs of military and political leaders from China, the United States, and the Soviet Union, but this is foiled by Sir James Bond (David Niven)'s daughter, Mata Bond (Joanna Pettet). With no other option, he returns to the baccarat table to try to win back the money. Later, he encounters baccarat Master Evelyn Tremble (Peter Sellers), who has been recruited by Bond to stop Le Chiffre from raising the money. Le Chiffre attempts to distract Tremble by performing elaborate magic tricks, but fails to prevent Tremble from winning. Afterwards, he arranges for Tremble to be kidnapped and subjects the agent to psychedelic torture in order to get back the money. The torture session is interrupted when his SMERSH masters, led by the film's main villain, Dr. Noah (Woody Allen), shoot him dead.

== 2006 film ==
In the 2006 film adaptation of Casino Royale, Le Chiffre is portrayed by Danish actor Mads Mikkelsen. Believed by MI6 to be Albanian and officially stateless, Le Chiffre is a private banker who finances international terrorism. M (Judi Dench) implies that Le Chiffre conspired with al-Qaeda in orchestrating the September 11 attacks, or at least deliberately profiteered from the attacks by short selling large quantities of airline stocks beforehand. In the video game version of Quantum of Solace, it is said that his birth name is "Jean Duran", in the MI6 mission briefings. A mathematical genius and a chess prodigy, his abilities enable him to earn large sums of money on games of chance and probabilities, and he likes to show off by playing poker. He has haemolacria, which causes him to weep blood out of a damaged vessel in his left eye. As in Fleming's novel, he dresses in immaculate black suits and uses a Salbutamol inhaler, here plated with platinum.

At the start of the movie, Le Chiffre is contacted by Mr. White (Jesper Christensen), a representative of an elite criminal organisation later revealed to be Quantum (and, later still, Spectre). White introduces Steven Obanno (Isaach de Bankolé), a leader of the Lord's Resistance Army in Uganda, to Le Chiffre, and arranges to launder several briefcases of money for Obanno. Le Chiffre invests the money along with his other creditors' funds into the aircraft manufacturer SkyFleet. Though SkyFleet's shares have been skyrocketing in wake of a new aircraft they are rolling out, Le Chiffre plans to short the company by purchasing put options, and ordering the destruction of the company's new prototype airliner, set to make its first flight out of Miami International Airport. James Bond (Daniel Craig) intervenes and foils the plan by killing Mollaka Danso (Sébastien Foucan), Le Chiffre's first contractor for the job, as well as Carlos Nikolic (Claudio Santamaria), the backup contractor Le Chiffre hires to take his place.

The failure of his airline scheme causes Le Chiffre to lose over $100 million. He sets up and enters a high-stakes Texas hold 'em tournament at Casino Royale in Montenegro in an attempt to recoup his losses before his clients find out that their money has been misappropriated and seek revenge against him. Bond is sent to make sure that Le Chiffre does not win back the money, hoping to force him to turn to MI6 for asylum in exchange for information on his creditors and employers. An accountant from HM Treasury, Vesper Lynd (Eva Green), is sent to accompany Bond to make sure the money is used properly.

During the tournament, Obanno and his lieutenant (Michael Offei) break into Le Chiffre's hotel room, restrain his girlfriend Valenka (Ivana Miličević), and garrotte him with a cord. Le Chiffre asks for, and is granted one last chance to win their money back. After Bond kills Obanno and his bodyguards, French intelligence agent René Mathis (Giancarlo Giannini) arranges the blame to be placed on Le Chiffre's bodyguard Leo (Emmanuel Avena) by planting the bodies in the trunk of Leo's car.

On the second day of the tournament, Le Chiffre initially outwits and bankrupts Bond, who cannot get additional funding approved by Vesper. However, Felix Leiter (Jeffrey Wright), a CIA agent sent to participate in the game, also in hopes of bankrupting Le Chiffre, agrees to bankroll Bond, on the condition that the CIA be allowed to take Le Chiffre in afterwards. Desperate, Le Chiffre has Valenka spike Bond's drink with digitalis. Bond almost dies, but, thanks to an antitoxin kit in his car, a defibrillator, and Vesper's timely assistance, he is revived at the last moment and returns to the game. During the final round, Le Chiffre's full house bests the hands of Infante (Ade) and Fukutu (Tom So), the two players preceding him, but loses to Bond's straight flush.

Le Chiffre kidnaps Vesper, forcing Bond to give chase, and leads him straight into a trap. Le Chiffre leaves Vesper, bound at the feet and hands, in the middle of the road, and Bond is forced to swerve to avoid hitting her and crashes his car.

Semiconscious, Bond is stripped naked and bound to a chair with the seat removed. Le Chiffre proceeds to whip Bond in the testicles repeatedly with the knotted end of a ship's lanyard, each time demanding the password for the account into which the tournament winnings will be transferred. Bond refuses to give in, telling Le Chiffre that no matter what torture he is subjected to, he will not give up the password and that Le Chiffre's clients will find and kill him. Bond also asserts that if Le Chiffre kills him, he will have nowhere to hide. Le Chiffre counters that even if he does kill Bond and Vesper, MI6 will still give him asylum in exchange for information about his clients. When Bond continues to defy him, Le Chiffre brandishes a knife and prepares to castrate him, only to be interrupted by the sound of gunfire outside. Mr. White enters the room with a pistol in hand, having just killed Valenka and Kratt (Clemens Schick); Le Chiffre pleads for his life and promises to recover the lost funds, but White denounces him as untrustworthy and shoots him in the head, killing him. To date, he is the only main Bond villain to die before the film's final act.

Le Chiffre is mentioned in the direct sequel, Quantum of Solace and is also seen in a background image inside MI6.

In Spectre, it is revealed that Le Chiffre - along with Dominic Greene (Mathieu Amalric), the main antagonist of Quantum of Solace, and Raoul Silva (Javier Bardem), the main antagonist of Skyfall - were agents of the titular criminal organization and its leader, Ernst Stavro Blofeld (Christoph Waltz).

== Appearances ==
=== Eon films ===
- Casino Royale (2006)
- Quantum of Solace (2008) – mentioned/seen in a photograph only
- Spectre (2015) – mentioned/seen in archive footage and a photograph only

=== Non-Eon productions ===
- "Casino Royale" (a CBS television adaptation for the TV series Climax!, 1954)
- Casino Royale (a Columbia Pictures release, 1967)
- Hitman: World of Assassination (a IO Interactive video game, 2021, appears as an time-limited mission in 2025)

=== 2006 film henchmen ===
- Alex Dimitrios (Simon Abkarian) – stabbed by Bond with his own knife
- Carlos Nikolic – accidentally blew himself up, courtesy of Bond
- Mollaka Danso – shot by Bond
- Leo – arrested
- Kratt – shot by Mr. White
- Valenka – shot by Mr. White
- Gräafin von Wallenstein (Veruschka von Lehndorff)
- Madame Wu (Tsai Chin)
- Tomelli (Urbano Barberini)

== See also ==
- Casino Royale (novel)
- Casino Royale (1954 film)
- Casino Royale (1967 film)
- Casino Royale (2006 film)
