= Casino Royale (1967 film) =

1967 James Bond spy parody film

- UK theatrical release poster by Robert McGinnis
- Directed by: John Huston; Ken Hughes; Val Guest; Robert Parrish; Joe McGrath
- Screenplay by: Wolf Mankowitz; John Law; Michael Sayers
- Based on: Casino Royale by Ian Fleming
- Produced by: Charles K. Feldman; Jerry Bresler
- Starring: Peter Sellers; Ursula Andress; David Niven; Woody Allen; Joanna Pettet; Orson Welles; Daliah Lavi; Deborah Kerr; William Holden; Charles Boyer; Jean-Paul Belmondo; George Raft; John Huston; Terence Cooper; Barbara Bouchet; Gabriella Licudi; Graham Stark; Tracy Reed; Tracey Crisp; Kurt Kasznar; Elaine Taylor; Angela Scoular
- Cinematography: Jack Hildyard
- Edited by: Bill Lenny
- Music by: Burt Bacharach
- Production company: Famous Artists Productions
- Distributed by: Columbia Pictures
- Release dates: 13 April 1967 (London); 28 April 1967 (United States)
- Running time: 131 minutes
- Countries: United Kingdom; United States
- Language: English
- Budget: $12 million
- Box office: $41.7 million

Casino Royale is a 1967 spy parody film originally distributed by Columbia Pictures. It is loosely based on the 1953 novel Casino Royale, the first novel in Ian Fleming's James Bond book series.

The film stars David Niven as the "original" Bond, Sir James Bond 007. Forced out of retirement to investigate the deaths and disappearances of international spies, he soon battles the mysterious Dr. Noah and the ruthless counter-intelligence agency SMERSH, inspired by actual organizations in the USSR. The film's tagline: "Casino Royale is too much... for one James Bond!" refers to Bond's plan to mislead SMERSH in which six other agents are pretending to be James Bond, namely, baccarat master Evelyn Tremble (Peter Sellers); millionaire spy Vesper Lynd (Ursula Andress); Bond's secretary Miss Moneypenny (Barbara Bouchet); Bond's daughter with Mata Hari, Mata Bond (Joanna Pettet); and British agents Cooper (Terence Cooper) and the Detainer (Daliah Lavi).

Charles K. Feldman, the producer, had acquired the film rights in 1960 and had attempted to get Casino Royale made as an Eon Productions Bond film; however, Feldman and the producers of the Eon series, Albert R. Broccoli and Harry Saltzman, failed to come to terms. Believing that he could not compete with the Eon series, Feldman resolved to produce the film as a satire. The budget escalated as various directors and writers became involved in the production, and actors expressed dissatisfaction with the project.

Released on 13 April 1967, two months before Eon's fifth Bond film, You Only Live Twice, Casino Royale was a financial success, grossing over $41.7 million worldwide, and Burt Bacharach's musical score was praised, earning him an Academy Award nomination for the song "The Look of Love", performed on the film's soundtrack by Dusty Springfield. Critical reaction, however, was generally negative, with many reviewers regarding it as a baffling, disorganised affair.

Since 1999, rights have been held by Metro-Goldwyn-Mayer, distributors of the Bond films by Eon Productions.

== Plot ==
Legendary British spy Sir James Bond 007, who has been retired for 20 years, is visited by M, the head of British MI6; CIA representative Ransome; KGB representative Smernov; and Deuxième Bureau representative Le Grand. They implore Bond to come out of retirement to deal with SMERSH, who have been eliminating their agents. Bond refuses, and chastises M for continuing to use his name for other field agents. M orders a mortar attack that destroys Bond's estate, but is himself killed in the process.

Bond returns M's remains (a toupée) to his widow, Lady Fiona McTarry, at M's Scottish estate. However, the real Lady Fiona has been replaced by SMERSH's Agent Mimi, and the household replaced with women in an attempt to destroy Bond's "celibate image". The women fail to seduce Bond, and Mimi is so impressed that she helps Bond foil the plot against him and joins a convent. Back in London, Bond is named head of MI6.

Bond is told that agents around the world are being killed by SMERSH due to their inability to refuse sex, and also that the "sex maniac", given the name "James Bond" when the real Bond retired, has gone to work in television. To confuse SMERSH and expose their masterplan, Bond orders that all remaining MI6 agents be codenamed "James Bond 007", and creates a programme to train male agents to ignore women's advances. Moneypenny recruits Cooper, a karate expert, who completes his training by successfully resisting a British agent known as the Detainer. Bond hires Vesper Lynd, a retired agent turned millionaire, to recruit baccarat expert Evelyn Tremble. Bond intends to use Tremble to beat SMERSH agent Le Chiffre, who has lost SMERSH funds gambling and is desperate to recover his losses before he is executed.

Following a clue from Agent Mimi, Bond instructs his estranged daughter, Mata Bond, to travel to West Berlin and infiltrate International Mothers' Help, an au pair service that is actually a SMERSH training centre. Mata uncovers a plan to sell compromising photographs of military leaders from the US, USSR, China, and Great Britain at an "art auction", another of Le Chiffre’s money-raising schemes. Mata destroys the photos, leaving baccarat as Le Chiffre's only option.

Evelyn arrives at the Casino Royale accompanied by Vesper, who foils an attempt by seductive SMERSH agent Miss Goodthighs to disable Tremble. Later that night at the casino, Evelyn realises that Le Chiffre is using infrared sunglasses to cheat. Vesper steals the sunglasses, allowing Evelyn to beat Le Chiffre. Vesper is apparently abducted outside the casino, and Evelyn is also kidnapped while pursuing her. Le Chiffre, desperate for the winning cheque, tortures Evelyn using hallucinogens. Vesper rescues Evelyn, only to subsequently kill him, while SMERSH agents kill Le Chiffre.

In London, Mata is kidnapped by SMERSH in a giant flying saucer, and Sir James and Moneypenny travel to Casino Royale to rescue her. They discover that the casino is located atop an underground headquarters run by SMERSH's evil Dr. Noah, who is revealed to be Sir James's nephew Jimmy Bond, a former MI6 agent believed to have been killed on a mission. Jimmy reveals his plan to use biological warfare to make all women beautiful and kill all men over 4 ft 6 in (1.37 m) tall, leaving him the "big man" who attracts all the women. He has also replaced various world leaders with look-alike robots and captured the Detainer in an attempt to persuade her to be his partner. She feigns agreement to dupe him into swallowing one of his “atomic time pills”, turning him into a walking atomic bomb.

Sir James, Moneypenny, Mata, and Cooper escape from their cell and fight their way back to the casino director's office, where Sir James establishes that Vesper is a double agent. The casino is overrun by secret agents and a battle ensues. American paratroopers and the French Foreign Legion arrive, adding to the chaos. Meanwhile, Jimmy counts down a series of hiccups, each bringing him closer to doom. The atomic pill eventually explodes, destroying Casino Royale and killing everyone inside. As Sir James and his agents appear in Heaven, Evelyn sees Jimmy and sends him descending to Hell.

== Cast ==
- Peter Sellers as Evelyn Tremble / James Bond: A baccarat master recruited by Vesper Lynd to challenge Le Chiffre at Casino Royale.
- Ursula Andress as Vesper Lynd / James Bond: A retired British secret agent forced back into service in exchange for writing off her tax arrears.
- David Niven as Sir James Bond: A legendary British secret agent forced out of retirement to fight SMERSH.
- Orson Welles as Le Chiffre: SMERSH's financial agent, desperate to win at baccarat to repay the money he has embezzled from the organisation.
- Joanna Pettet as Mata Bond / James Bond: Bond's daughter, born of his love affair with Mata Hari.
- Daliah Lavi as the Detainer / James Bond: A British secret agent who successfully poisons Dr. Noah with his own atomic pill.
- Woody Allen as Jimmy Bond / Dr. Noah: Bond's nephew and head of SMERSH under his Dr. Noah alias. Because he is rendered mute in the presence of his uncle, he uses a pre-recorded voice (that of Valentine Dyall) in some scenes.
- Deborah Kerr as Agent Mimi / Lady Fiona McTarry: A SMERSH agent who masquerades as the widow of M but cannot help falling in love with Bond.
- William Holden as Ransome: A CIA executive who accompanies the cross-spy-agency team to persuade Bond out of retirement, then reappears in the final climactic fight scene.
- Charles Boyer as Le Grand: A Deuxième Bureau executive who accompanies the cross-spy-agency team to see Bond.
- John Huston as M / McTarry: Head of MI6 who dies from an explosion caused by his own bombardment of Bond's estate when the cross-spy-agency team visits.
- Kurt Kasznar as Smernov: A KGB executive who accompanies the cross-spy-agency team to see Bond.
- George Raft as Himself, flicking a coin as he did in Scarface.
- Jean-Paul Belmondo as French Legionnaire
- Terence Cooper as Cooper / James Bond: A British secret agent specifically chosen, and trained for this mission to resist the charms of women.
- Barbara Bouchet as Miss Moneypenny / James Bond 007: The daughter of Bond's original Moneypenny, who works for the service in the same position held by her mother years earlier.

Major stars, such as Raft and Belmondo, were given top billing in marketing and screen trailers despite only appearing for a few minutes in the final scene.

Supporting cast

- Angela Scoular, Gabriella Licudi, Tracey Crisp, Elaine Taylor and Alexandra Bastedo as Buttercup, Eliza, Heather, Peg and Meg: A quintet of SMERSH agents undercover as M/Lord McTarry's daughters.
- Jacqueline Bisset (credited as Jacky Bisset) as Miss Giovanna Goodthighs: A SMERSH agent who attempts to kill Evelyn at Casino Royale. She also appears as an extra who stands behind Le Chiffre at the casino.
- Anna Quayle as Frau Hoffner: Mata Hari's teacher, portrayed as a parody of Cesare in the German expressionist film The Cabinet of Dr. Caligari (her school is modelled on that film's expressionist decor).
- Derek Nimmo as Hadley: A British secret serviceman who briefs Mata Bond on her mission to Berlin.
- Ronnie Corbett as Polo: A SMERSH agent at the International Mothers' Help, in love with Mata Hari and expresses the same feelings for Mata Bond.
- Colin Gordon as Casino director
- Bernard Cribbins as Carlton Towers: A British Foreign Office official who drives Mata Bond all the way from London to Berlin in his taxi.
- Tracy Reed as Fang Leader
- John Bluthal as Casino doorman / MI5 man
- Geoffrey Bayldon as Q
- John Wells as Fordyce: Q's assistant.
- Duncan Macrae as Inspector Mathis: He shows Evelyn his "credentials" in the pre-title sequence.
- Graham Stark as cashier
- Chic Murray as Chic
- Jonathan Routh as John
- Richard Wattis as British Army officer
- Vladek Sheybal as Le Chiffre's Representative
- Percy Herbert as First Piper
- Joe Cornelius as Cowboy
- Penny Riley as Control Girl
- Jeanne Roland as Captain of the Guards
- Fiona Lewis (uncredited) as Casino Girl
- Burt Kwouk (uncredited) as Chinese General
- Caroline Munro (uncredited) as Guard

Casino Royale also boasts the greatest number of actors in a Bond film either to have appeared or to go on to appear in the rest of the Eon series – besides Andress in Dr. No, Sheybal appears as Kronsteen in From Russia with Love, Kwouk features as Mr. Ling in Goldfinger and an unnamed SPECTRE operative in You Only Live Twice, Roland plays a masseuse in You Only Live Twice, and Scoular appears as Ruby Bartlett in On Her Majesty's Secret Service. Jack Gwillim, who has a minor role as a British Army officer, plays a Royal Air Force officer in Thunderball. Peter Burton, who appears in the lineup of possible Bonds with Cooper, had previously played Q in Dr. No. Caroline Munro, seen very briefly as one of Dr Noah's gun-toting guards, went on to play Naomi in The Spy Who Loved Me, and also appears with other models on the cover of the 1969 Pan Books edition of On Her Majesty's Secret Service. Milton Reid, who appears in a bit part as the temple guard, opening the door to Mata Bond's hall, plays one of Dr. No's guards and Stromberg's underling, Sandor, in The Spy Who Loved Me. John Hollis, who plays the temple priest in Mata Bond's hall, went on to play the implied Ernst Stavro Blofeld character in the pre-credits sequence of For Your Eyes Only. John Wells, Q's assistant, appears in For Your Eyes Only as Denis Thatcher. Hal Galili, who appears briefly as a US Army officer at the auction, had earlier played gangster Jack Strap in Goldfinger.

=== Uncredited cast ===
Well-established stars such as Peter O'Toole and sporting legends such as Stirling Moss took uncredited parts solely in order to work with the other cast members. Moss played Evelyn's driver. O'Toole supposedly took payment in a case of champagne.

Stunt director Richard Talmadge employed Geraldine Chaplin to cameo in a brief Keystone Cops insert, where he also appears. The film proved to be young Anjelica Huston's first experience in the film industry as she was called upon by her father, John Huston, to cover the screenshots of Kerr's hands. It features the first theatrical appearance of David Prowse as Frankenstein's monster. John Le Mesurier features in early scenes as M's driver.

== Production ==
=== Development ===
In November 1952, several months before the publication of his first James Bond novel Casino Royale, Ian Fleming purchased the small theatrical agency Glidrose Productions Limited to produce a screen adaptation of the novel. After the publication, Curtis Brown, Associated British Pictures and the Music Corporation of America all expressed interest in purchasing the film rights. Curtis Brown later licensed the rights to produce a one-hour Americanized television adaptation for Climax! on CBS. In March 1955, Fleming sold the film rights of his novel Casino Royale to the producer Gregory Ratoff for $6,000 ($72,112 in 2025 dollars) after Ratoff had bought a $600 six-month option from Fleming the previous year. Ratoff commissioned Lorenzo Semple Jr. to write a script, but both men thought Bond was "unbelievable" and "stupid". According to Semple, Ratoff considered the project needed Bond to be female and wished to cast Susan Hayward as 'Jane' Bond. In January 1956, The New York Times reported Ratoff had set up a production company with Michael Garrison to produce a film adaptation, but their pitch was rejected by 20th Century Fox and they were unable to find financial backers before his death in December 1960. Talent agent Charles K. Feldman had represented Ratoff and bought the film rights from his widow. Albert R. Broccoli, who had held an interest in adapting James Bond for some years, offered to purchase the Casino Royale rights from Feldman, but he declined. Feldman and his friend, director Howard Hawks, had an interest in adapting Casino Royale and considered Leigh Brackett as a writer and Cary Grant as James Bond. They eventually decided not to proceed after they saw Dr. No (1962), the first Bond adaptation made by Broccoli and his partner Harry Saltzman through their company Eon Productions.

By 1964, Feldman had invested nearly $550,000 of his own money into pre-production. He decided to try a deal with Eon Productions and United Artists. The attempt at a co-production fell through because Feldman frequently argued with Broccoli and Saltzman about profit division and they could not agree on a production start date. Feldman decided to offer his project to Columbia Pictures with a script written by Ben Hecht, and the studio accepted. Given that Eon's series had led to spy films being in vogue at the time, Feldman opted to make his film a spoof of the Bond series instead of a straightforward adaptation. Hecht's contribution to the project, if not the final result, was in fact substantial and he wrote several complete drafts. In May 1966, Time magazine reported that Hecht had "three bashes" at completing a script, while his papers contained material from four surviving screenplays by Hecht. His treatments were almost entirely "straight" adaptations, far closer to the original source novel than the spoof which the final production became. A draft from 1957 discovered in Hecht's papers—but which does not identify the screenwriter—is a direct adaptation of the novel, albeit with the Bond character absent, instead being replaced by a poker-playing American gangster.

Later drafts see vice made central to the plot, with the Le Chiffre character becoming head of a network of brothels (as he is in the novel) whose patrons are then blackmailed by Le Chiffre to fund Spectre (an invention of the screenwriter). The racy plot elements opened up by this change of background include a chase scene through Hamburg's red-light district that results in Bond escaping disguised as a female mud wrestler. New characters appear such as Lili Wing, a brothel madam and former lover of Bond whose ultimate fate is to be crushed in the back of a garbage truck, and Gita, wife of Le Chiffre. The beautiful Gita, whose face and throat are hideously disfigured as a result of Bond using her as a shield during a gunfight in the same sequence which sees Wing meet her fate, goes on to become the prime protagonist in the torture scene that features in the book, a role originally Le Chiffre's. Virtually nothing from Hecht's scripts was ever filmed, although a draft dated to February 1964 has a line of dialogue containing the idea of MI6 having given multiple agents the name of James Bond after Bond has died to confuse the other side. Hecht died from a heart attack in April 1964, two days after finishing his script and before he was able to present it to Feldman. Joseph Heller (and his friend George Mandel) worked on the project for a few weeks in early 1965, submitting more than 100 pages after Feldman offered Heller $150,000. Heller later wrote about this episode in the essay How I found James Bond, lost my self-respect and almost made $150,000 in my spare time.

The script was then completely re-written by Billy Wilder, and by the time the film reached production, only the idea that the name James Bond should be given to a number of other agents remained. This key plot device in the finished film, in the case of Hecht's version, occurs after the demise of the original James Bond (an event which happened prior to the beginning of his story) which, as Hecht's M puts it, "not only perpetuates his memory, but confuses the opposition." In addition to the credited writers, Woody Allen, Peter Sellers, Val Guest, Ben Hecht, Joseph Heller, Terry Southern and Wilder are all believed to have contributed to the screenplay to varying degrees. Feldman called it "a four ring circus". Sellers had hired Southern to write his dialogue (and not the rest of the script) to "upstage" Orson Welles and Allen.

=== Casting ===
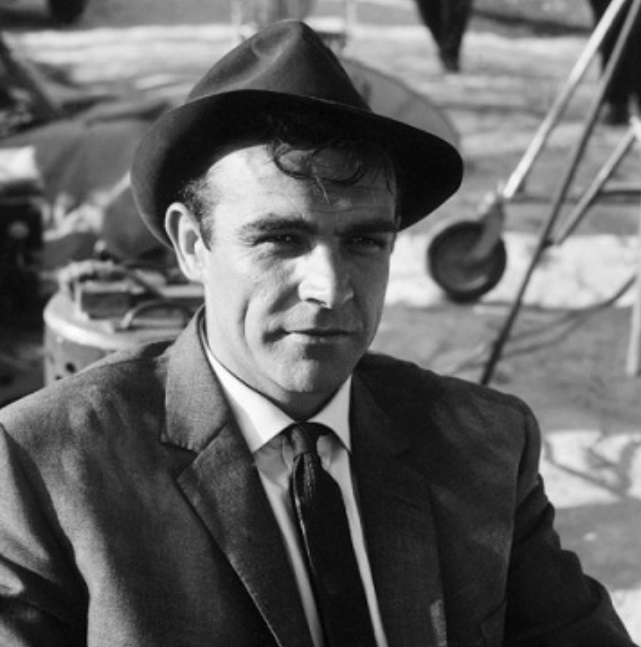
Sean Connery, who played James Bond in the Eon Productions films, was initially approached to reprise the role for Casino Royale.

Feldman approached Sean Connery to play Bond, but rejected Connery's offer to do the film for $1 million. Feldman originally intended to cast Terence Cooper as Bond and had him under personal contract for two years prior to production. Feldman had worked with Sellers on What's New Pussycat? (1965) and offered the actor a part as Bond. Sellers originally turned him down saying he felt the image of Bond was "too fixed". Feldman persuaded Sellers to change his mind by asking the actor to instead play a "little man", who plays Bond. Jean-Paul Belmondo and George Raft received major billing, even though both only appear briefly during the climactic brawl at the end, Raft flipping his trademark coin and promptly shooting himself dead with a backward-firing pistol, while Belmondo appears wearing a fake moustache as the French Foreign Legion officer who requires an English phrase book to translate "merde!" into "ooch!" during his fistfight. Raft's coin flip, which originally appeared in Scarface (1932), had been spoofed by Raft a few years earlier in Some Like It Hot (1959).

At the Intercon science fiction convention held in Slough in 1978, David Prowse commented on his part, apparently his big-screen debut. He claimed that he was originally asked to play "Super Pooh", a giant Winnie-the-Pooh in a superhero costume who attacks Evelyn Tremble during the Torture of the Mind sequence. This idea, as with many others in the film's script, was rapidly dropped, and Prowse was re-cast as a Frankenstein-type monster for the closing scenes.

=== Filming ===
Filming began on 11 January 1966. Principal photography took place at Pinewood Studios, Shepperton Studios and Twickenham Studios in London. Extensive sequences also featured London, notably Trafalgar Square and the exterior of 10 Downing Street. Mereworth Castle in Kent was used as the home of Sir James Bond, which is blown up early in the film. Much of filming for M's Scottish castle was done on location in County Meath, Ireland, with Killeen Castle as the focus. However, the car chase sequences where Bond leaves the castle were shot in the Perthshire village of Killin, with further sequences in Berkshire (specifically Old Windsor and Bracknell). Filming had wrapped by October 1966, at which stage Feldman said the budget was between $8.5–9.5 million, of which the cast cost $3 million. Sellers was to receive a percentage of the gross after the takings reached $17.5 million.

Five different directors helmed different segments and stunt coordinator Richard Talmadge co-directed the final sequence. Feldman said that Huston contributed 38 minutes in the final cut, Hughes 25 minutes, McGrath 20 minutes, Parrish 20 minutes, and Guest 26 minutes. Huston's sequence involved Sir James Bond meeting the representatives of agencies. It was shot in Ireland and Kent in April 1966. Huston worked on his section of the script with Wolf Mankowitz. Huston had written most of Beat the Devil (1953) on location, but says "that was discipline compared to this. It was day to day then it's moment to moment here." Huston wanted Robert Morley as M, but when he was unavailable, the director decided to play the role himself. Huston says the film "was broached to me as a lark, which it was." McGrath shot for six weeks. Parrish filmed the segment with Andress and Sellers at Shepperton. Hughes was not known for comedies generally but had just directed Drop Dead Darling (1966). Feldman says Parrish was to provide "suspense" while McGrath did "Sellers like comedy". Guest wrote and directed the last section and was given the responsibility of splicing the various "chapters" together. He was offered the unique title of coordinating director but declined, claiming the chaotic plot would not reflect well on him if he were so credited. His extra credit was labelled 'additional sequences' instead. Guest, Hughes, Huston, McGrath, and Parrish, received the directorial credits for Casino Royale, with Guest also credited for "additional sequences."

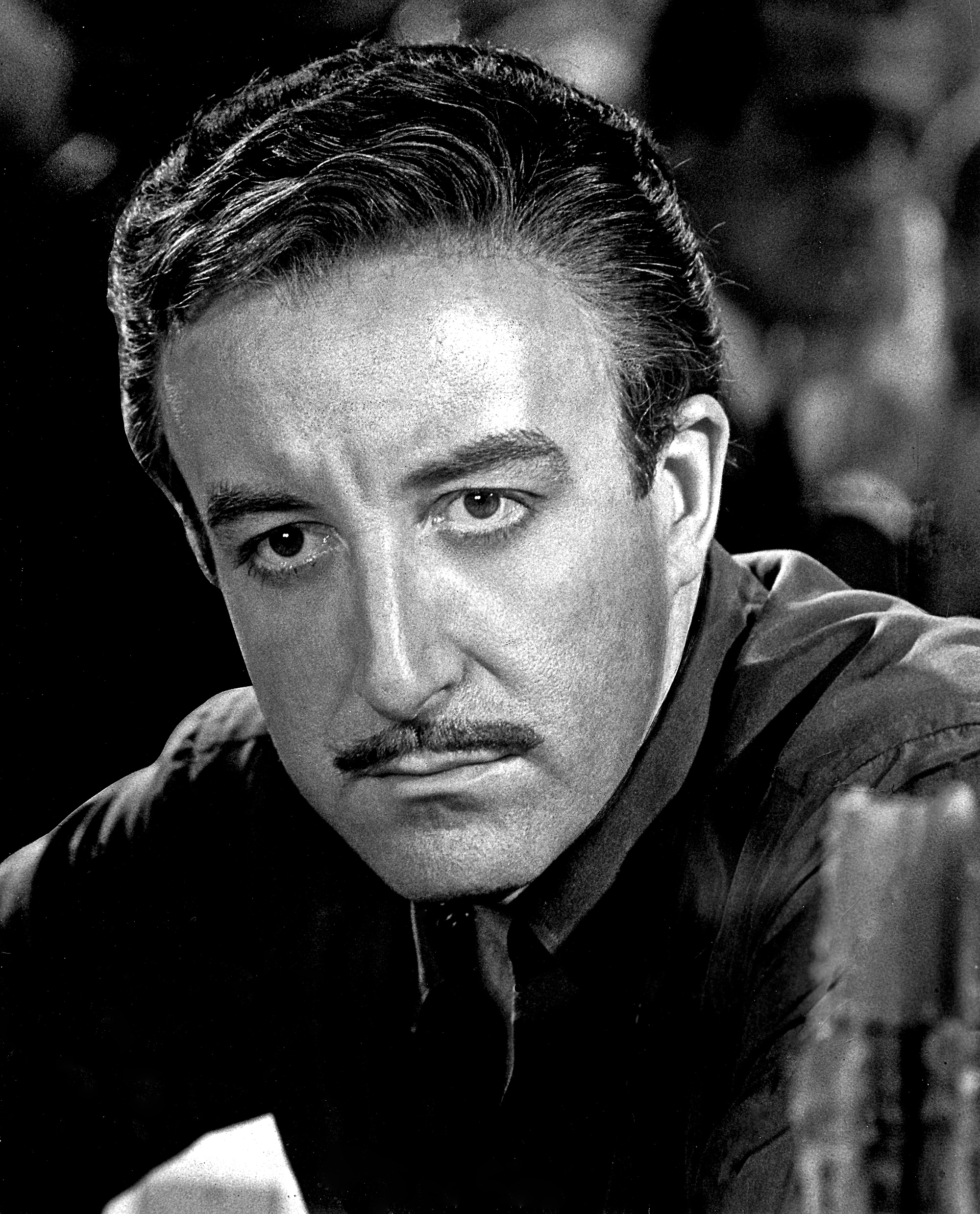
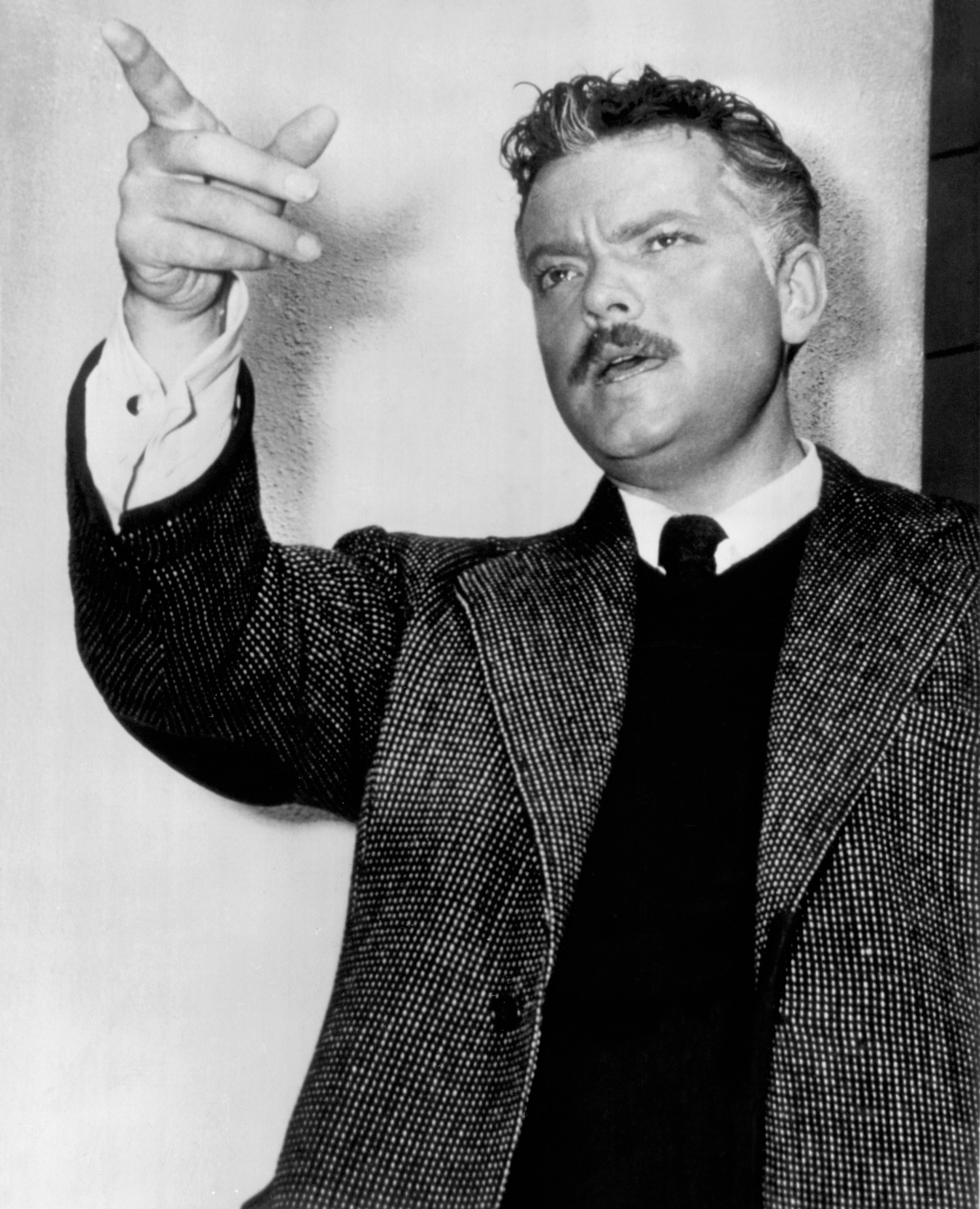
Production of Casino Royale was marred by several incidents and conflicts, including a rivalry between Peter Sellers (left) and Orson Welles.

Part of the behind-the-scenes drama of production concerned the filming of Sellers' segments. Screenwriter Wolf Mankowitz declared that Sellers felt intimidated by Welles to the extent that, except for a couple of shots, neither was in the studio simultaneously. Other versions of the legend depict the drama stemming from Sellers being slighted, in favour of Welles, by Princess Margaret (whom Sellers knew) during her visit to the set. Welles also insisted on performing magic tricks as Le Chiffre, and the director obliged. Guest wrote that Welles did not think much of Sellers, and had refused to work with "that amateur". McGrath, a personal friend of Sellers, was punched by the actor when he complained about Sellers' on-set behaviour.

Some Sellers biographies suggest that he took the role of Bond to heart, and was annoyed at the decision to make Casino Royale a comedy, as he wanted to play Bond straight. This is illustrated in somewhat fictionalised form in the film The Life and Death of Peter Sellers (2004), based on the biography by Roger Lewis, who has claimed that Sellers kept re-writing and improvising scenes to make them play seriously. This story is in agreement with the observation that the only parts of the film close to the book are the ones featuring Sellers and Welles. In the end, Sellers' involvement with the film was cut abruptly short. Additionally, Sellers went absent for days or weeks at a time, refused to appear in his scenes with Welles and exited before all of his scenes had been shot. As a result, Sellers was unavailable for the filming of an ending and other interlinking scenes, leaving the filmmakers to devise a way to make the existing footage work without him. The framing device of a beginning and ending with Niven was created to salvage the material. Guest, who had been given the task of creating a narrative thread which would link all segments of the film, chose to use the original Bond and Vesper Lynd as linking characters.

Signs of missing footage from the Sellers segments are evident at various points. Evelyn is not captured on camera; an outtake of Sellers entering a racing car was substituted. In this outtake, he calls for the car, à la The Pink Panther, to chase down Vesper and her kidnappers; the next thing that is shown is Evelyn being tortured. Outtakes of Sellers were also used for Evelyn's dream sequence (pretending to play the piano on Andress' torso), in the finale – blowing out the candles while in highland dress – and at the end of the film when all the various "James Bond doubles" are together. In the kidnap sequence, Evelyn's death is also very abruptly inserted; it consists of pre-existing footage of Evelyn being rescued by Vesper, followed by a later-filmed shot of her abruptly deciding to shoot him, followed by a freeze-frame over some of the previous footage of her surrounded by bodies (noticeably a zoom-in on the previous shot). As well as this, an entire sequence involving Evelyn going to the front for the underground James Bond training school (which turns out to be under Harrods, of which the training area was the lowest level) was never shot, thus creating an abrupt cut from Vesper announcing that Evelyn will be James Bond to Evelyn exiting the lift into the training school. Many sequences were dropped, so that several actors never appeared in the final cut, including Ian Hendry (as 006, the agent whose body is briefly seen being disposed of by Vesper), Mona Washbourne and Arthur Mullard.

=== Music ===
For the musical score, Feldman decided to bring in Burt Bacharach, who had composed the music for Feldman's previous production, What's New Pussycat?. Bacharach worked for over two years writing for Casino Royale, in the meantime composing After the Fox and being forced to decline participation in Luv. Lyricist Hal David contributed with various songs, many of which appear in instrumental versions. Herb Alpert & the Tijuana Brass performed some of the songs with Mike Redway singing the title song as the end credits roll. The title theme was Alpert's second number one on the Easy Listening chart where it spent two weeks at the top in June 1967 and peaked at number 27 on the Billboard Hot 100. Alpert would later contribute a trumpet solo to the title song of the 1983 James Bond film Never Say Never Again, which was performed by Alpert's wife, Lani Hall.

The film features the song "The Look of Love" performed by Dusty Springfield. It is played in the scene of Vesper recruiting Evelyn, seen through a man-size aquarium in a seductive walk. It was nominated for the Academy Award for Best Original Song. The song was revisited in the first Austin Powers film, which, to a degree, was inspired by Casino Royale. For European release, Mireille Mathieu sang versions of "The Look of Love" in both French ("Les Yeux D'Amour"), and German ("Ein Blick von Dir").

Bacharach would later rework two tracks of the score into songs: "Home James, Don't Spare the Horses" was re-arranged as "Bond Street", appearing on Bacharach's album Reach Out (1967), and "Flying Saucer – First Stop Berlin", was reworked with vocals as "Let the Love Come Through" by orchestra leader and arranger Roland Shaw. A clarinet melody would later be featured in a Cracker Jack peanut popcorn commercial.

As an in-joke, a brief snippet of John Barry's song "Born Free" is used early in the film. At the time, Barry was the main composer for the Eon Bond series, and said song had won an Academy Award over Bacharach's own "Alfie".

The cover art was done by Robert McGinnis, based on the film poster. The original LP was later issued by Varèse Sarabande in the same track order as shown below. It has been re-released under licence by Kritzerland Records and again by Quartet Records, the latter to mark the film's 50th anniversary. This latest issue has included almost all of Bacharach's underscore, representing 35 tracks in total.

The album became famous among audio purists (also called Audiophiles) for the excellence of its recording. It then became a standard "audiophile test" record for decades to come, especially the vocal performance by Springfield on "The Look of Love".

The soundtrack has since been released by other companies in different configurations (including complete score releases). The highly regarded master tapes were damaged during a 1990s remastering, so none of the subsequent re-releases is considered to be as fine as the original LP release.

== Release ==
Columbia at first announced release in time for Christmas 1966; however, problems during production postponed the release until April 1967. Casino Royale had its world premiere in London's Odeon Leicester Square on 13 April 1967, breaking many opening records in the theatre's history. Its American premiere was held in New York City on 28 April, at the Capitol and Cinema I theatres. It opened two months prior to the fifth Bond film by Eon Productions, You Only Live Twice.

=== Box office ===
Despite the lukewarm nature of contemporary reviews, the pull of the James Bond name was sufficient to make it the 13th-highest-grossing film in North America in 1967 with a gross of $22.7 million ($219 million in 2025 dollars) and a worldwide total of $41.7 million ($403 million in 2025 dollars). (Note: Variety put its North American rentals for 1967 at $10.2 million. These figures refer to rentals accruing to the distributors.) Welles attributed the success to a marketing strategy that featured a naked tattooed woman on the film's posters and print ads. The campaign also included a series of commercials featuring British model Twiggy. In its opening weekend in the United States and Canada, it set a record three-day gross for Columbia of $2,148,711. As late as 2011, the film was still making money for the estate of Peter Sellers, who negotiated an extraordinary 3% of the gross profits (an estimated £120 million), with the proceeds currently going to Cassie Unger, daughter and sole heir of Sellers' beneficiary, fourth wife Lynne Frederick. When domestic box office receipts are adjusted for inflation, Casino Royale is 20th-largest grossing of the entire Bond franchise.

=== Critical reception ===
No advance press screenings were held, leading reviews to only appear after the premiere. Roger Ebert, in his review for the Chicago Sun-Times, wrote "[t]his is possibly the most indulgent film ever made". Time magazine described Casino Royale as "an incoherent and vulgar vaudeville". Variety declared the film to be "a conglomeration of frenzied situations, 'in' gags and special effects, lacking discipline and cohesion. Some of the situations are very funny, but many are too strained." Bosley Crowther of The New York Times considered Casino Royale had "more of the talent agent than the secret agent". He praised the film's "fast start" and the scenes up to the baccarat game between Bond and Le Chiffre. Afterward, Crowther felt, the script became tiresome, repetitive and filled with clichés due to "wild and haphazard injections of 'in' jokes and outlandish gags", leading to an excessive length that made the film a "reckless, disconnected nonsense that could be telescoped or stopped at any point".

Writing in 1986, Danny Peary noted, "It's hard to believe that in 1967 we actually waited in anticipation for this so-called James Bond spoof. It was a disappointment then; it's a curio today, but just as hard to sit through." Peary described the film as being "disjointed and stylistically erratic" and "a testament to wastefulness in the bigger-is-better cinema", before adding, "It would have been a good idea to cut the picture drastically, perhaps down to the scenes featuring Peter Sellers and Woody Allen. In fact, I recommend you see it on television when it's in a two-hour (including commercials) slot. Then you won't expect it to make any sense."

Around 2010, a few reviewers were more impressed. Andrea LeVasseur of AllMovie called the film "the original ultimate spy spoof", and opined that the "nearly impossible to follow" plot made it a "satire to the highest degree". Further describing it as a "hideous, zany disaster", LeVasseur concluded that it was "a psychedelic, absurd masterpiece". Cinema historian Robert von Dassanowsky wrote about the artistic merits of the film: "like Casablanca, Casino Royale is a film of momentary vision, collaboration, adaption, pastiche, and accident. It is the anti-auteur work of all time, a film shaped by the very zeitgeist it took on." Romano Tozzi complimented the photography, sets and special effects, but viewed the film as "senseless parody—a disconnected hodgepodge of all the gimmicks and sex-ridden cliches imaginable." In his review of the film, Leonard Maltin remarked, "Money, money everywhere, but [the] film is terribly uneven—sometimes funny, often not." Simon Winder called Casino Royale a "pitiful spoof", while Robert Druce described it as "an abstraction of real life".

On the review aggregator website Rotten Tomatoes, 26% of 42 critics' reviews are positive, with an average rating of 4.6/10. The website's consensus reads: "A goofy, dated parody of spy movie cliches, Casino Royale squanders its all-star cast on a meandering, mostly laugh-free script." Metacritic, which uses a weighted average, assigned the film a score of 48 out of 100, based on 11 critics, indicating "mixed or average" reviews.

=== Accolades ===
Award	Category	Recipient(s)	Result
Academy Awards	Best Song	"The Look of Love"; Music by Burt Bacharach; Lyrics by Hal David	Nominated
British Academy Film Awards	Best British Costume Design – Colour	Julie Harris	Nominated
Grammy Awards	Best Original Score Written for a Motion Picture or a Television Show	Burt Bacharach	Nominated
Laurel Awards	Top Comedy	Casino Royale	Nominated

=== Home media and film rights ===
Columbia first issued Casino Royale on VHS in 1989, and on LaserDisc in 1994. In 1999, following the Columbia/MGM/Kevin McClory lawsuit on ownership of the Bond film series, the rights were transferred to Metro-Goldwyn-Mayer (whose sister company United Artists co-owns the franchise) as a condition of the settlement. MGM then released the first DVD edition of Casino Royale in 2002, followed by a 40th anniversary special edition in 2007.

Years later, as a result of the Sony/Comcast acquisition of MGM, Columbia would once again become responsible for co-distribution, as well as the entire Eon Bond series, including the 2006 adaptation of Casino Royale. However, MGM Home Entertainment changed its distributor to 20th Century Fox Home Entertainment in May 2006. Fox was responsible for the distribution and debut of the 1967 Casino Royale on Blu-ray in 2011.

While the rights today stand with United Artists (under MGM, who currently maintains home entertainment rights), Danjaq LLC, Eon's holding company, is credited as one of its present copyright owners, the other being original production unit Famous Artists Productions.

== See also ==
- Outline of James Bond
