= Baccarat =

Gambling card game

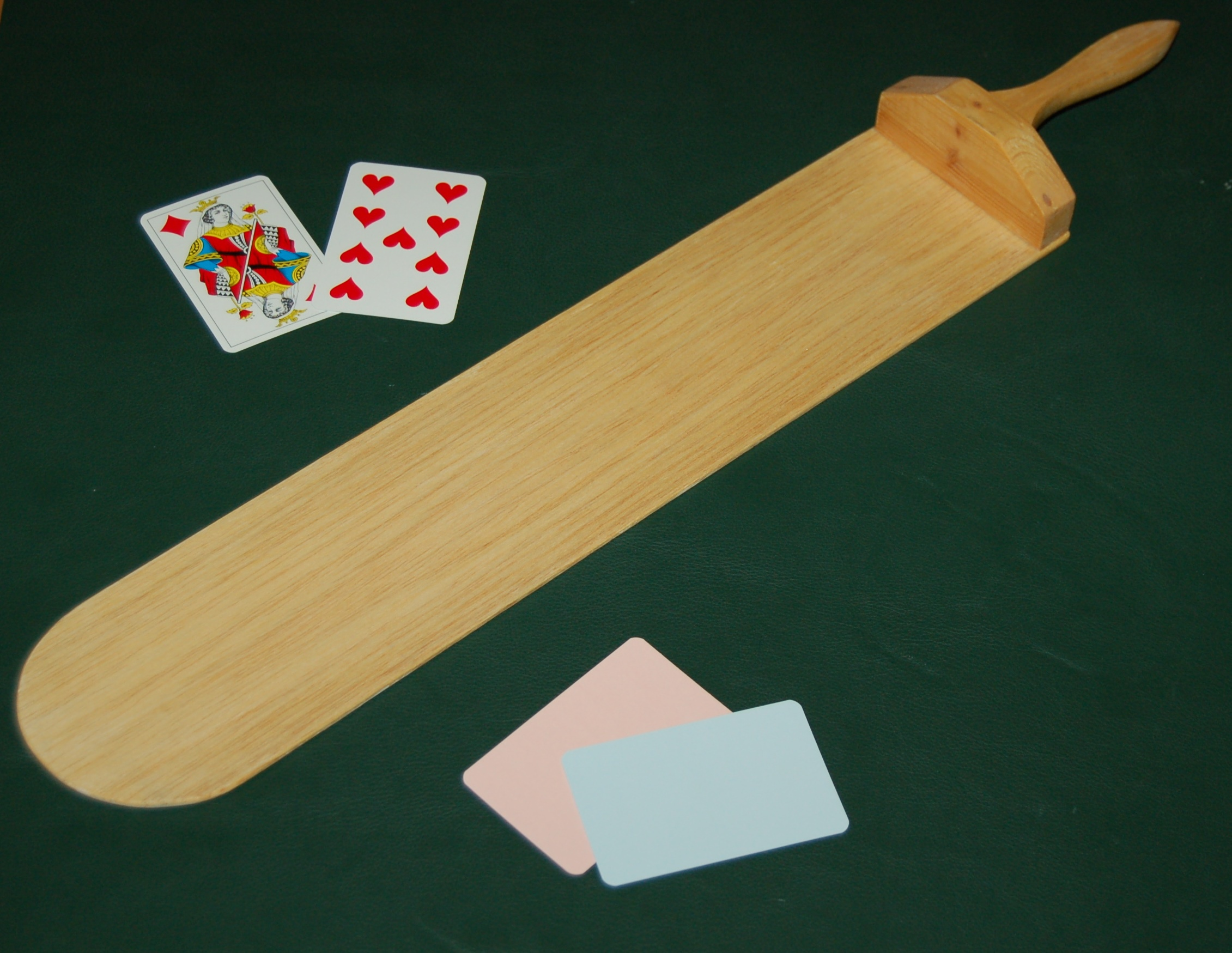
Playing cards and a baccarat pallet, which is used to deliver cards to players

Baccarat or baccara (/ˈbækəræt, bɑːkəˈrɑː/; French: [bakaʁa]) is a card game. It is now played mainly at casinos, but in the past it was also popular at house parties and private gaming rooms. The game's origins are a mixture of precursors from China, Japan, and Korea. It then gained popularity in Europe, and a faster French variant emerged. The most common version today is of Cuban origin.

Baccarat is a comparing card game played between two hands, the "player" and the "banker". Each baccarat coup (round of play) has three possible outcomes: "player" (player has the higher score), "banker", and "tie".

There are three popular variants of the game: punto banco, baccarat chemin de fer, and baccarat banque (or à deux tableaux). In punto banco, each player's moves are forced by the cards the player is dealt. In baccarat chemin de fer and baccarat banque, by contrast, both players can make choices. The winning odds are in favour of the bank, with a house edge of at least one percent.

== History ==
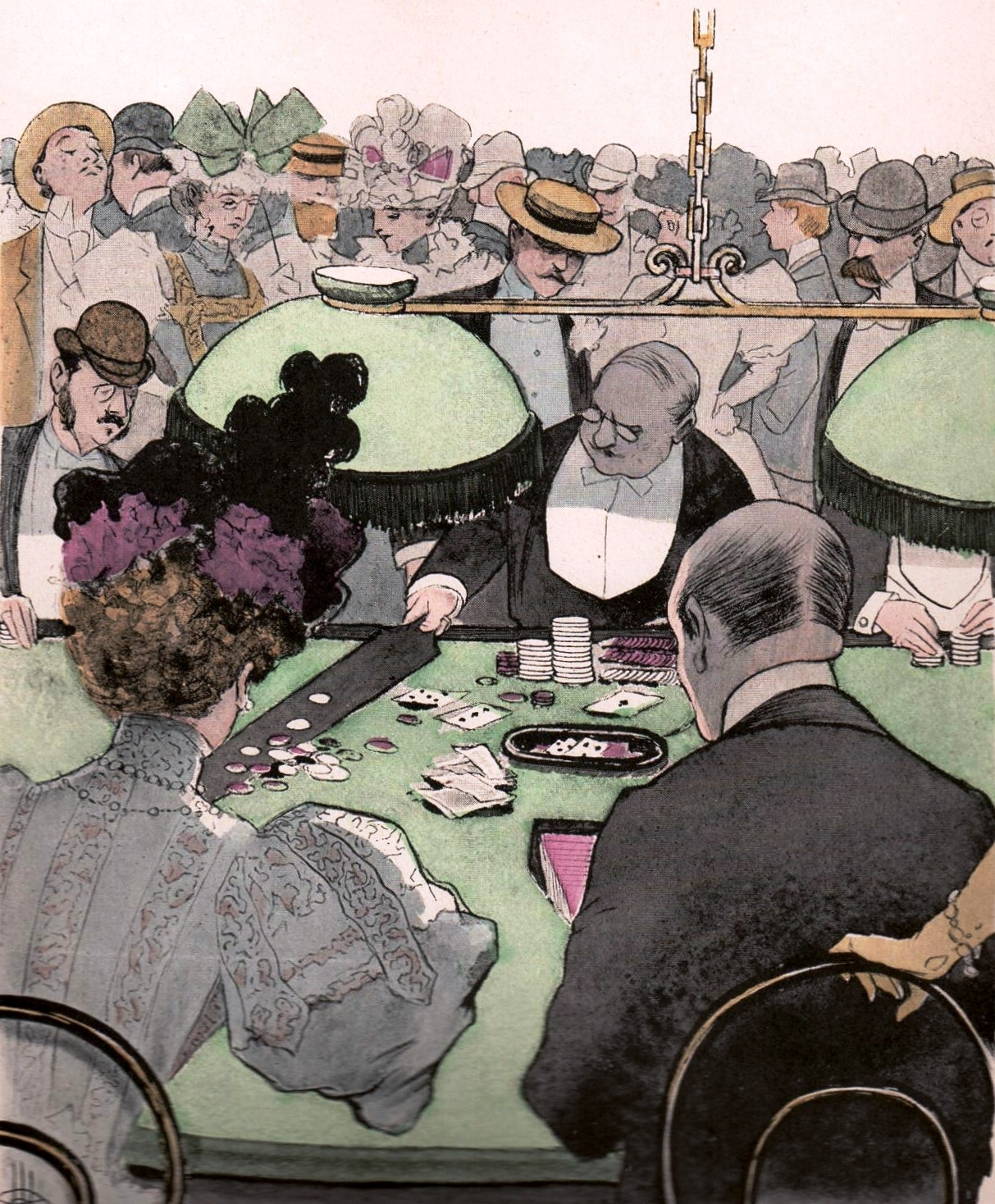
1897 illustration of baccarat players

The origins of the game are disputed. Some sources claim that it dates to the 19th century, others that the game was introduced into France from Italy at the end of the 15th century by soldiers returning from the Italian Wars during the reign of King of France Charles VIII.

David Parlett considers Macao the immediate precursor to baccarat. Its name and rules suggest it may have been brought over by sailors returning from Asia where similar card games have been played since the early 17th century such as San zhang, Oicho-Kabu, and Gabo japgi. Macao appeared in Europe at the end of the 18th century and was popular for all classes. Its notoriety led to King Victor-Amadeus III banning it in all his realms in 1788. It was the most popular game in Watier's, an exclusive gentlemen's club in London, where it led to the ruin of Beau Brummell. It was declared illegal late in the 19th century, as a gambling game of almost pure chance; however it remained wildly popular in high society, aficionados including the Prince of Wales (the future Edward VII), who was compelled to testify in court following the Royal baccarat scandal of 1890, in which a player was accused of cheating during games held at Tranby Croft in Yorkshire, England. The match in Arthur Schnitzler's 1926 novella Night Games (Spiel im Morgengrauen) contains instructions for Macao under the name of baccarat. Its popularity in the United States waned after the early 20th century. The game still has a following in Continental Europe, especially in Russia. Like Macao and Victoria, baccarat was banned in Russia during the 19th century though the rules continued to be printed in game books.

Baccarat has been popular among the French nobility since the 19th century. Before the legalization of casino gambling in 1907, people in France commonly played baccarat in private gaming rooms. Dating to this time period, Baccarat Banque is the earliest form of baccarat; it is a three-person game and mentioned in Album des jeux by Charles Van-Tenac. Later, Chemin de Fer emerged as a two-player zero-sum game from Baccarat Banque. Chemin de Fer is a version which first appeared in the late 19th century. Its name, which is the French term for "railway", comes from the version being quicker than the original game, the railway being at that time the fastest means of transport. This version of baccarat remains the most popular in France.

Baccarat Punto Banco, in which the bettor bets on whether the Player or the Banker hand wins, was a significant change in the development of modern baccarat. It developed into a house-banked game in Havana in the 1940s, and is now the most popular modern form in most parts of the world.

== Valuation of hands ==
In baccarat, the 2 through 9 cards (of any suit) are worth face value (in points); the 10, jack, queen, and king are worth zero; aces are worth one point; jokers are not used. The value of the hand is the units digit of the sum of the constituent cards, known as modulo ten arithmetic. For example, a hand consisting of 2 and 3 is worth five, while a hand consisting of 6 and 7 is worth three, that being the value of the units digit in the combined point total of thirteen. The highest possible hand value in baccarat is therefore nine.

== Versions ==
=== Punto banco ===
Punto banco is nowadays the most played version of baccarat in the United States. In punto banco, the casino banks the game at all times, and commits to playing out both hands according to fixed drawing rules, known as the "tableau" (French: "board"), in contrast to more historic baccarat games where each hand is associated with an individual who makes drawing choices. The player (punto) and banker (banco) are simply designations for the two hands dealt out in each coup, two outcomes which the bettor can back; the player hand has no particular association with the gambler, nor the banker hand with the house.

Punto banco is dealt from a shoe containing 6 or 8 decks of cards shuffled together; a cut card is placed in front of the seventh from last card, and the drawing of the cut-card indicates the last coup of the shoe. The dealer burns the first card face up and then based on its respective numerical value, with aces worth 1 and face cards worth 10, the dealer burns that many cards face down. For each coup, two cards are dealt face up to each hand, starting from "player" and alternating between the hands. The croupier may call the total (e.g., "five player, three banker"). If either the player or banker or both achieve a total of 8 or 9 at this stage, the coup is finished and the result is announced: a player win, a banker win, or tie. If neither hand has eight or nine, the drawing rules are applied to determine whether the player should receive a third card. Then, based on the value of any card drawn to the player, the drawing rules are applied to determine whether the banker should receive a third card. The coup is then finished, the outcome is announced, and winning bets are paid out.

Punto banco is a pure game of chance and therefore it is not possible for a gambler's bets to be rationally motivated.

==== Tableau of drawing rules ====
If neither the player nor the banker is dealt a total of 8 or 9 in the first two cards (known as a "natural"), the tableau is consulted, first for the player's rules, then the banker's.

Player's rule
If the player has an initial total of 5 or less, they draw a third card. If the player has an initial total of 6 or 7, they stand.

Banker's rule
If the player stood pat (i.e. has only two cards), the banker regards only their own hand and acts according to the same rule as the player, i.e. the banker draws a third card with a total of 5 or less and stands with a total of 6 or 7.
If the player drew a third card, the banker acts according to the more complex rules as follows:

- If the banker total is 2 or less, they draw a third card regardless of what the player's third card is.
- If the banker total is 3, they draw a third card unless the player's third card is an 8.
- If the banker total is 4, they draw a third card if the player's third card is a 2, 3, 4, 5, 6, or 7.
- If the banker total is 5, they draw a third card if the player's third card is a 4, 5, 6, or 7.
- If the banker total is 6, they draw a third card if the player's third card is a 6 or 7.
- If the banker total is 7, they stand.

Tableau for punto banco
Banker total	Player's third card									
Banker total	0	1	2	3	4	5	6	7	8	9
0–2	H	H	H	H	H	H	H	H	H	H
3	H	H	H	H	H	H	H	H	S	H
4	S	S	H	H	H	H	H	H	S	S
5	S	S	S	S	H	H	H	H	S	S
6	S	S	S	S	S	S	H	H	S	S
7	S	S	S	S	S	S	S	S	S	S

The croupier will deal the cards according to the tableau and the croupier will announce the winning hand, either the player or the banker. Losing bets will be collected and the winning bets will be paid according to the rules of the house. Usually, 1-to-1 even money will be paid on player bets and 19-to-20 on banker bets (even money with "5% commission to the house on the win").

Should both the player and banker have the same total value at the end of the deal, the croupier shall announce "égalité — tie bets win." All tie bets will be paid at 8-to-1 odds and all bets on player or banker remain in place and active for the next game (the customer may or may not be able to retract these bets depending on casino rules).

==== Casino provision ====
In the U.S., the full-scale version of punto banco is usually played at large tables in roped off areas or private rooms separated from the main gaming floor. The game is frequented by high rollers, who may wager tens or hundreds of thousands of dollars on a single hand. Minimum bets are relatively high, often starting at $100 and going as high as $500. Posted maximum bets are often arranged to suit a player. The table is staffed by a croupier, who directs the play of the game, and two dealers who calculate tax and collect and pay bets. Six or eight decks of cards are used, normally shuffled only by the croupier and dealers. The shoe is held by one of the players, who deals the cards on the instructions of the croupier according to the tableau. On a player win, the shoe moves either to the highest winning bettor, or to the next person in clockwise order around the table, depending on the casino's conventions. The shoe may be refused or the croupier may be requested to deal.

==== Road maps and scoreboards ====
Modern baccarat tables often display previous results from the current shoe on scoreboards or "road" recording forms. Common baccarat roads include the Bead Plate Road, the Big Road, the Big Eye Boy, the Small Road, and the Cockroach Road. A 2016 study of Chinese baccarat players described these five methods as standard roads and noted that casinos in Macau had introduced electronic screens to display shoe history and road records.

==== Odds and strategy ====
Punto banco has both some of the lowest house edges among casino table games, and some of the highest. The player bet has, relative to most casino bets, a low house edge of 1.24%, and the banker bet (accounting for the 5% commission on the win) is even lower, at 1.06%. In contrast, the tie bet, which pays 8-to-1, has a high house edge of 14.4%. Most casinos in the United Kingdom pay the tie at 9-to-1, resulting in a house edge of approximately 4.85%.

House edge for punto banco (with an 8-deck shoe)
If bank/banco wins	1.06%
If player/punto wins	1.24%
If ties (8-to-1 payout)	14.4%
If ties (9-to-1 payout)	4.85%

Card counting can be employed to reduce the house edge by about 0.05%. If paired with a technique known as edge sorting, baccarat players can obtain a significant edge versus the casino.

==== Variations ====
Mini-baccarat is a version of punto banco played on a small table with smaller minimums/maximums. It is popular with the more casual players, particularly those from Asia, where this version is commonly played.

A mini-baccarat variation where even money is paid on winning banker bets (rather than 95%), except when the banker wins with 6, in which case the banker bet pays 1-to-2 (50% of the bet), goes under various names including Super 6 and Punto 2000. The house edge on a banker bet under Super 6 is 1.46% compared to regular commission baccarat's 1.058%. This is equivalent to increasing the commission by 17.45% to 5.87%. The banker wins with a 6 about five times in an eight-deck shoe. In addition to its increased house edge, the Super 6 variation is used by casinos for its speed, since it partially does away with the time-consuming process of calculating and collecting commission on winning banker bets except for winning with a 6.

In a similar variation called EZ-baccarat, even money is paid on both winning banker or player bets, except when the banker wins with a total of 7 after the third card is drawn, which results in a push on banker bets. The game has two additional options, the Dragon 7, a specific bet of a winning three-card 7 on the banker side, which pays 40-to-1 instead of pushing, and Panda 8, a bet of a winning three-card 8 on the player side, which pays 25-to-1.

=== Baccarat banque ===
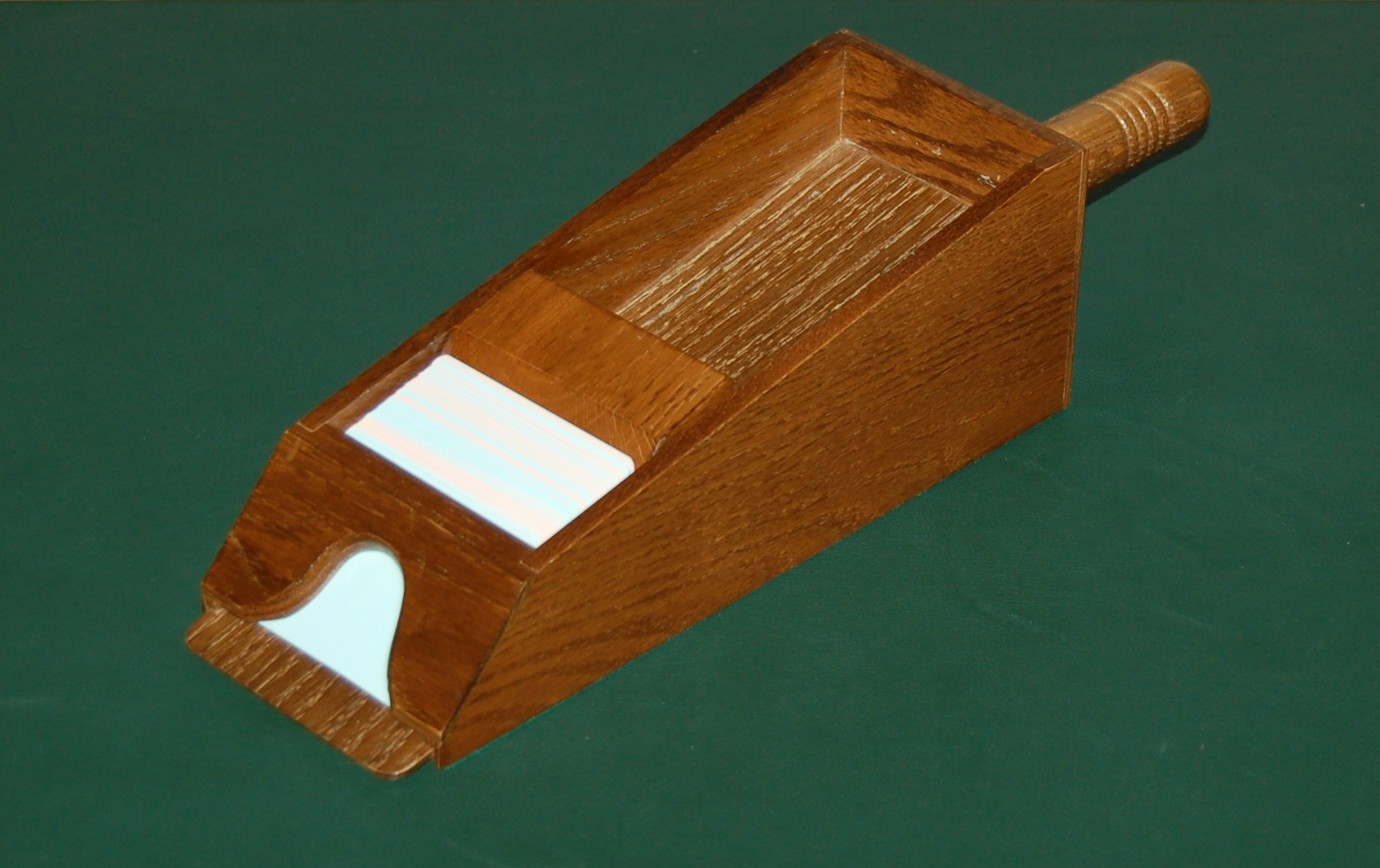
A card shoe as is used in banque. A red card marked with the word STOP is placed a few cards before the end of the deck.

There are two variants of baccarat banque: banque limitée ("casino") and banque ouverte ("no-limit") also known as à tout va ("anything-goes"). The social form of the game is banque ouverte; anyone may take the position of banker at no-limit banque, but there are no minimum or maximum table limits, and thus the position of banker has substantial financial exposure (equal to the sum of all action on the table). In banque limitée, table limits are obligatory, and the position of banker is always filled by an employee of the casino.

Formally speaking, banque is a three-player game in which two of the players are teams represented by rotating captains; the third player is the banker, who plays for himself only. Betting interests are largely independent from the course of play itself. For example, it is common to play Left against banker, hoping to win for the benefit of the 'team', while financially backing Right against banker—obviously, in this situation, Left has no influence on Right's choices in play, no matter how high his stake.

(Nothing prevents no-limit banque from being played in casinos—but more stringent procedural safeguards apply compared to casino banque, such as play being limited to one designated table, with two sessions of two so-called tailles, an obligatory recess between the second and third session, and monopolisation of the bank being expressly prohibited. For these reasons, the game more firmly associated with casinos is banque limitée.)

In no-limit banque, a member of the public acts as banker either for a taille (which generally lasts approximately two hours) or for a session of two tailles. A stop card is inserted at least ten cards before the end of the shoe; when this card is reached (or when the banker retires, at their discretion), that constitutes a taille. Each individual deal is called a coup. Monégasque tradition (mentioned in the laws of Monaco) is to use cards without corner indices.

The role of banker is generally assumed by putting one's name on a written list of the form:

Session	Taille	Banker
Afternoon	1	Jane Smith
Afternoon	2	Fred Jones
RECESS
Evening	3	Leo Williams
Evening	4	Archie Taylor

If more than one person wishes to bank in a particular time slot, it must be settled by drawing of lots. The shoe contains six inter-shuffled decks for no-limit and three inter-shuffled decks for casino banque. Shuffling is done by the croupier 'washing' the cards on the table, and new cards must be used each session; this is all the more important if playing with paper cards (as in casino play).

The banker sits opposite the croupier with the discard area between. On both sides of the banker are the pontes or punters; at the Monte Carlo Casino, a maximum of eight punters play per side for a total of sixteen.

At the beginning of a taille, one player on each side (the ayant-main) volunteers to handle the cards, with the rest of that player's side wagering on their decisions. Each coup begins with the croupier audibly calling "faites vos jeux". Bets (paid at even money) may then placed by the punters on Left, Right, or à cheval (straddling Left and Right); the bet of the banker, of necessity, equals the sum of all bets placed. Left and Right are here reckoned as the banker's left and right (which are the croupier's right and left). The croupier then calls "rien ne va plus" and deals, face down, one card to banker's right, one card to banker's left, one card to banker, then another to banker's right, another to banker's left, and another to banker. Each side wins or loses depending on the cards dealt to that side only. (The banker, rather than the croupier, may deal—particularly in social situations where there is no croupier.) Bets may not be placed before "faites vos jeux" or after "rien ne va plus".

If the cards held by any player (including the banker) sum to 8 or 9 modulo 10, this is called a natural and must be declared by placing the cards face up. The croupier announces la petite for natural 8 and la grande for natural 9. La grande beats la petite, and a natural beats anything else. Equal naturals push. If one side has a natural against the banker and the other side does not, that side's account is settled but play continues between the banker and the other side.

Provided he does not have a natural, the ayant-main on each side (in the order right-left-banker) may ask for a card by calling aloud, "Une carte", or stand pat by calling "Pas de carte" or "Non". Third cards are dealt face up. Elementary baccarat strategy, similar to that of blackjack, dictates that one ought to take a card if one has 4 or less and stand if he has 6 or 7; it is silent as to a total of 5, and the player should exercise discretion.

Punters' choices are constrained by informal sanctions only (the reason being that the ayant-main acts for his half of the table—if he adopts a mathematically bad strategy and loses, it is entirely foreseeable that he incur his team's displeasure). Informal sanctions may also apply in the event that the ayant-main backs only the opposite side (playing for Left while betting wholly on Right and vice versa); accepting the cards is viewed as tantamount to announcing an intention to win, even if the win does not benefit oneself. The banker, playing for himself alone, has no constraints at all as regards play. Nonetheless, social norms do govern, to a lesser or greater degree, retirement from banking in light of the magnitude of bets; some circles may view the placing of inordinately large wagers as tending to ruin the evening (giving the banker reason to withdraw from play early) and thus bad form, while others may simply accept the possibility as part of the excitement of the game.

Hitting on 4 or less and standing on 6 or 7 are not guaranteed to be the optimal choice—elementary strategy is purely a rule of thumb or heuristic, and contravening it is sometimes mathematically optimal. The exceptions are the province of advanced strategy, which contemplates a) the balance of bets between Left and Right and b) the distribution of cards remaining in the shoe, as estimated by a card count that is dissimilar to that of blackjack. Faced with a choice between obeying elementary baccarat strategy absolutely and winning, it is always better to win.

Bets are settled once the banker has made their decision, provided of course that the banker did not get a natural. First, a commission of 1.25% is taken if applicable, in the following way:

- If the banker wins: the total of all stakes laid by the punters.
- If the banker wins against one table and loses against the other: the difference between the total stakes laid on the winner and the total stakes laid on the loser, provided that this number is positive.
- If the banker wins against one table and ties against the other: the total stakes laid on the table against which the banker won.

The croupier then announces aloud, "[total], left, gagnant/perdant/égalité [against the banker]; [total], right, gagnant/perdant/égalité". Values divisible by 10 are called baccarat, count nil, and are the source of the name of the game.

Settlement of bets is as follows:

Results of the two tableaux, from the punter’s perspective	Net result on the whole à-cheval stake
Both win	Win the whole stake
One wins; the other ties	Win half the stake
One wins; the other loses	Neither gain nor loss
Both tie	Neither gain nor loss
One loses; the other ties	Lose half the stake
Both lose	Lose the whole stake

Each punter continues to hold the cards for their half of the table so long as he wins or ties. When a punter loses, the next hand is dealt to his immediate neighbour. No financial penalty may be given to a player who commits a fault; the appropriate sanction is to revoke his card-handling privileges.

The banker may retire between coups at his discretion; this is treated as the end of the taille. The banker must never retire during a coup (voicing his intention to retire during a coup is treated as retiring at the next legal opportunity). If the banker loses, he need not (and generally does not) retire. This is the distinction between banque and chemin (discussed below).

It is strictly prohibited for any punter to signal the banker in any way but aloud. Banque is not invulnerable to some of the same dubiously legitimate techniques as faro, and collusion through the use of confederates is not unheard of. In such a case, the active players for one side of the table or another communicate the values of their cards to the banker; forcibly passing the role of ayant-main after a loss helps to prevent this eventuality, though it can not of course eliminate the possibility entirely.

In casino banque, there are minor differences. First and foremost, the banker is never a member of the general public; professional bankers are used, and they are paid a percentage of the house takings, with full discretion (advanced strategy dictates that if one half of the table bets an amount far greater than the other, more effort should be expended in trying to win against the former than the latter, and the banker is obviously free to play strategically). Second, the casino has "full latitude" to set minimum and maximum table limits, "in accordance with the customs prevailing at casinos". Third, the commission is set at 2%. In practice, tailles are approximately half as long (lasting an hour, give or take) but unlimited.

As with other equal-chance games (which are known in French as jeux de cercle), there is no intrinsic house edge, not even in casino banque; instead, a commission is explicitly taken as the house's fee for rental of the cards, of the premises, and of security. Because the commission is applied unequally, there are some discontinuities (notably, there is no fee if the loser is backed by more money than the winner), and this accounts for some of the room for strategic play inherent in this game—but the game is not so structured as cleanly to favour one outcome over the other, nor to favour the house (which, as the rules ought to make clear, need not even take part).

In other words: it would certainly be incorrect to say that playing banque as a punter is a 'sucker bet' (though, being a game of skill, there is such a thing as a poor ayant-main, and the usual expedient in this case is simply to decline handling the cards)—but so too would it be incorrect to say that banking at banque is 'for suckers' or the like. Both roles are potentially rewarding—but they are differently rewarding, and this is simply part of the game qua game.

=== Chemin de fer ===
Six decks of cards are used, shuffled together. Players are seated in random order, typically around an oval table; discarded cards go to the center. Play begins to the right of the croupier and continues counterclockwise.

Once play begins, one player is designated as the banker; this player also deals. The other players are "punters". The position of banker passes counterclockwise in the course of the game. In each round, the banker wagers the amount they are willing to risk. Each other player, in order, then declares whether they will "go bank", playing against the entire current bank with a matching wager. A maximum of one player may "go bank". If no one "goes bank", players make their wagers in order. If the total wagers from the players are less than the bank, observing bystanders may also wager up to the amount of the bank. If the total wagers from the players are greater than the bank, the banker may choose to increase the bank to match; otherwise, the excess wagers are removed in reverse play order.

The banker deals four cards face-down: two to themselves and two held in common by the remaining players. The player with the highest individual wager (or first in play order if tied for highest wager) is selected to represent the group of non-banker players. The banker and player both look at their cards; if either has an eight or a nine, this is immediately announced and the hands are turned face-up and compared. If neither hand is an eight or nine, the player has a choice to accept or refuse a third card; if accepted, it is dealt face-up. Traditional practice – grounded in mathematics, similar to basic strategy in blackjack, but further enforced via social sanctions by the other individuals whose money is at stake – dictates that one always accept a card if one's hand totals between 0 and 4, inclusive, and always refuse a card if it totals 6 or 7. After the player finishes, the banker, in turn, decides either to accept or to refuse another card. Once both the banker and the representative player have made their decision, the hands are turned face-up and compared.

If the player's hand exceeds the banker's hand when they are compared, each wagering player receives back their wager and a matching amount from the bank, and the position of banker passes to the next player in order. If the banker's hand exceeds the player's hand, all wagers are forfeit and placed into the bank, and the banker position does not change. If there is a tie, wagers remain as they are for the next hand.

If the banker wishes to withdraw, the new banker is the first player in order willing to stake an amount equal to the current bank total. If no one is willing to stake this amount, the new banker is instead the next player in order, and the bank resets to whatever they wish to stake. Many games have a set minimum bank or wager amount.

Unlike punto banco, which is purely a game of chance, chemin de fer includes an element of player skill.

=== Macao ===
Macao uses two decks of cards shuffled together. Punters place their bets (within the agreed limits) against the banker. Initially, one card is dealt clockwise and face down to every player by the banker. The punters' objective is to beat the banker's card value or risk losing their bet. In case of a tie, whoever has the same value with fewer cards wins. The banker wins if there is a tie in both value and number of cards (in an early version, all bets are off). Any punter who receives a natural 9 receives triple the amount of the bet as long as the banker does not have a natural 9 too. Winning with a natural 8 awards double while winning with a 7 or under is only equal to the bet. Players can request additional cards which are dealt face up; if it is a ten or a face card, they can reject it and ask for another. In an early version of this game, going over 9 with extra cards amounts to a "bust" as in blackjack, later versions use modulo 10 arithmetic as in the other games. Beating the banker with a pair only awards an equal amount to the bet. When the deck is exhausted, the player to the banker's left becomes the new banker.

Victoria is a variation of Macao where players are initially dealt two cards.

== Economy ==
American casinos are generating an increasing amount of their revenue from baccarat play. For example, in May 2012, Nevada only generated 18.3% of its total table gaming win from baccarat. However, in May 2013, this percentage increased to 33.1% and in May 2014 it rose to 45.2%.

Baccarat is the most important table game in Macau, with taxes from baccarat play constituting the largest single source of public funding in Macau. About 91% of total income from Macau casinos in 2014 came from the punto banco variation.

== In popular culture ==
=== Royal baccarat scandal ===
The Tranby Croft affair in 1891 and William Gordon Cumming's subsequent lawsuit were known together as the royal baccarat scandal, due to the involvement of the future King Edward VII. Since the Prince of Wales was involved in the incident, it inspired a huge amount of media interest in the game, bringing baccarat to the attention of the public at large. Accounts of the scandal in newspapers also included the rules for the game. The scandal became the subject of music hall songs and a stage play.

=== James Bond ===
Baccarat chemin-de-fer is the favoured game of James Bond, the fictional secret agent created by Ian Fleming. Bond plays the game in numerous novels, most notably his 1953 debut, Casino Royale, in which much of the plot revolves around a game between Bond and SMERSH operative Le Chiffre; the unabridged version of the novel includes a primer to the game for readers who are unfamiliar with it. It is also featured in several filmed versions of the character, including the 1954 television adaptation of Casino Royale, where Bond bankrupts Le Chiffre in order to have him eliminated by his Soviet superiors; Dr. No, where Bond is first introduced while playing the game in film; Thunderball; the 1967 version of Casino Royale, which is the most detailed treatment of a baccarat game in any Bond film; On Her Majesty's Secret Service; For Your Eyes Only; and GoldenEye.

In the 2006 movie adaptation of Casino Royale, baccarat is replaced by Texas hold 'em poker, largely due to the poker boom at the time of filming.

=== Phil Ivey controversy ===
The advantage play technique of edge sorting gained attention in 2012, when a casino in the United Kingdom refused to pay professional gambler Phil Ivey about $11 million, after they determined that he had used the technique to gain an advantage over the house. The same year, Ivey and a female companion won $9.6 million at the Borgata casino in Atlantic City using edge sorting and another $500,000 playing craps using his gains as a stake in the game. The Borgata paid him after his win but then sued Ivey in 2014 after surveillance video showed he had manipulated the dealer into rotating certain cards in the deck to exploit the flaw on the back of the cards. The Borgata prevailed and won $10.1 million, which Ivey refused to pay. In February 2019, the Borgata received approval from the U.S. District Court for the District of New Jersey to go after Ivey's assets in the state of Nevada, since he had no assets in the state of New Jersey to pursue. Ivey and the Borgata reached a settlement in July 2020.
