= Jérôme Ben Aoues =

French parkour practitioner

Jérôme Ben Aoues has been practising parkour since he met Sébastien Foucan, almost immediately after the creation of the popular movement art parkour. He has starred in 4 movies/documentaries, Yamakasi - Les samouraï des temps modernes, Jump London, Jump Britain and The Making of Jump Britain.
