= Sébastien Foucan =

French freerunner (born 1974)

- Born: 27 May 1974 (age 52); Paris, France
- Occupations: Actor; freerunning instructor; public speaker
- Years active: 2005–present
- Website: foucan.com

Sébastien Foucan (born 27 May 1974) is a French freerunner.

He is the founder of freerunning and considered an early developer of parkour. Known for his views on the philosophy of parkour and freerunning, Foucan stresses the need for training in the basics of both for individual safety and to maintain a positive public perception of the activities.

In 2002, Foucan featured in a television advertisement for the Nike Presto running shoe. He became known in the United Kingdom after Mike Christie's Channel 4 documentary Jump London in September 2003 and the subsequent documentary Jump Britain. In addition to those programmes, Foucan appeared as Mollaka in the James Bond film Casino Royale. He spent three months in the Bahamas on the film. Foucan appeared in the music video for Madonna's 2005 single "Jump", accompanying the singer on her 2006 "Confessions Tour". He helped K-Swiss develop the Ariake, the first in a line of five freerunning-shoe models. Foucan appeared in a trailer for the game Mirror's Edge.

It was reported on 3 January 2012 that Foucan would be among 15 celebrities in the seventh series of Dancing on Ice. On 19 February he was eliminated in a double Ultimate Skills skate-off with Heidi Range.

Foucan has also won World Chase Tag PRO 2 GO Europe with the team he founded and created, Blacklist. He was the star of the tournament, defeating teams from around the continent. Blacklist also finished 3rd/4th in World Chase Tag 4, mainly due to Foucan.

== Freerunning ==
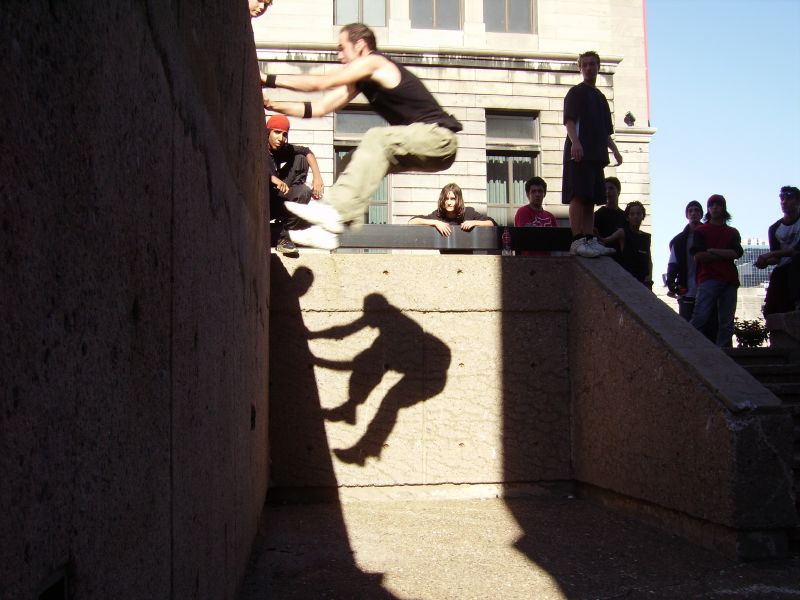
A saut de bras

Foucan attributed the name free running to Guillaume Pelletier, who he had worked with at the time of Jump London. The word "freerunning" was coined during the filming of Jump London to present Parkour to the English-speaking world. Since then it has come to represent Foucan's methodology, which focuses on innovation and expression rather than Parkour's speed and efficiency.

Foucan explains freerunning:

Freerunning, for me, is my Parkour evolution. I can't say anymore that I do Parkour, because if I want to be free to do flips, or let's say I'm learning breakdancing, and I would like to incorporate it into my Parkour expression...Not to say I am doing capoeira, breakdancing, Parkour and anything else. Freerunning is the way I choose to name my own expression. Now people recognize Parkour with flips (acrobatics) as freerunning. But only the action of doing Parkour and flips is not freerunning. It's the action of adding more stuff into your expression. That's the Freerunning attitude.

Foucan has described the core value

Follow your way; Always practise; Respect others in their practise; Be an inspiration for others; Be positive and look for positive environments; Respect your environment; Feel free to try other disciplines; Don't take it too seriously; The journey is more important than the goal; There is no good or bad, right or wrong but what is important is what you learn from experiences through practise; Freerunning is not an elite discipline, but for the people who love and continue to move; Channel your energy in a good way, a way to be better.

He defines Freerunning as a discipline for self-development, following one's own way. Foucan's dissatisfaction with Parkour's limited creativity and self-expression motivated him to develop a similar art of movement which became known as freerunning.

He reported that he was forced to define free running as a discipline separate from parkour because others had rejected his practice as not being within their definition of parkour. For example, David Belle and other Parkour enthusiasts have criticized Foucan and freerunning:

Free Running? A kind of demonstration mixing parkour techniques, and acrobatics to be more spectacular and serve the medias and marketing, but also a sport. The term Parkour has been invented by David Belle and Hubert Koundé in 1998 and the word Free Running has been created much later by Sebastien Foucan for the purpose of spreading Parkour in a marketing fashion (they thought the word "parkour" wasn't international enough and Sebastien Foucan proposed them this word). The problem is that they fully mixed acrobatics to impress people. This is where Freerunning becomes different from Parkour. To make a comparison, Free Running is like artistic katas in martial arts, the goal is only to be spectacular. So it is related to parkour but doesn't answer to the same philosophy. I mean, when you practice to show how spectacular your jump is gonna be, people aren't focused anymore on the difficulty, on the obstacle but on you. This showing-off attitude isn't the parkour philosophy which preaches for humility. In this, Free Running and Parkour are fundamentally opposite even if the first one is related to the second one. Like the traditional way and the freestyle way.

Foucan has described freerunning as a process of movement aimed at self-development through physical activity, play, and creativity. He regards it as an act symbolic of leaving "fixed path and social systems".

Foucan appeared in series 4 and 5 of Ninja Warrior UK.

== Filmography ==
Acting

- Casino Royale (2006) as Mollaka
- The Tournament (2009) as Anton Bogart
- The Antwerp Dolls (2015) as Marco
- Creators: The Past (2020) as Tammuz

Stunts

- The Tournament
- 55 Degrees North Episode #1.1 freerunning performer (2004)
