= WFPF =

WFPF may refer to:

- World Freerunning and Parkour Federation
- WFPF-LP, a low-power radio station (92.7 FM) licensed to serve Frostproof, Florida, United States
