= Presto (Nike) =

Sub-brand of Nike, Inc.

Presto was a sub-brand of Nike, Inc., introduced in 2002 as part of Nike's shift towards the fashion fitness trends of the 21st century. Initially, it offered the Nike Air Presto running shoe, as well as several watches and fashion accessories, all of which were characterized by a futuristic and colorful aesthetic.

Presto achieved considerable success in the early 2000s, due to its highly innovative products and marketing strategy. Although the broader Presto concept ended in the 2000s, Nike continues to authorize the sale of its Presto running shoe as part of the NikeID project, with over 100 studios across Eurasia and North America carrying Presto shoes.

== Overview ==
The Presto brand was established in 2002 as part of Nike's effort to break in to the growing fitness fashion market of the 2000s. The Nike Air Presto running shoe had been in development for several years, and was co-created by Tobie Hatfield, in want of a fashionable running shoe that could stretch to accommodate various foot sizes. This enabled Nike to produce a shoe in just five sizes, which greatly reduces sales losses and material waste, and allows for a broader variety of colors and designs to be sold. This was considered a cutting edge concept at the time, and was developed by Nike engineer Bob Mervar. Nike CEO Mark Parker and colleagues were personally impressed by this shoe, and an aggressive marketing campaign soon followed.

=== Accessories ===
The Presto Digital Sport Bracelet was designed by Scott Wilson. Presto digital watches were made of nylon, and featured a glass-like high gloss finish. The watch quickly became iconic, selling over four million units in less than three years.

== Advertising ==
The Presto marketing campaign targeted an urban young professional demographic. It relied heavily on Parkour, which at the time was still unknown to the global audience. The TV spots, directed by Wieden+Kennedy, featured David Belle and Sebastien Foucan, showcasing their physical talents in the brutalist urban environment of southern Paris, and eventually attracted an Emmy nomination.
