= Daniel Ilabaca =

English free runner and traceur (born 1988)

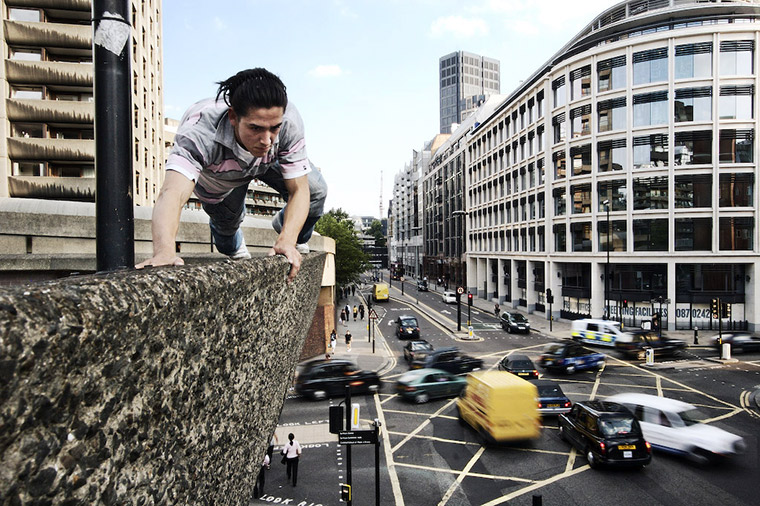
- Ilabaca doing a cat balance in 2007
- Occupations: Free runner, traceur
- Height: 1.79 m (5 ft 10 1/2 in)
- Website: www.daniel-ilabaca.co.uk

Daniel Marcus Ilabaca is a free runner and traceur.

He along with Ryan Doyle, are the founders of the World Freerunning and Parkour Federation.

== Personal life ==
Ilabaca was born on 23 January 1988 in Moreton, England.

== Career ==
Daniel first noticed Parkour after seeing a man on the street perform a wall flip and wanted to be able to do the same. He later took up the Brazilian martial art Capoeira, but was disappointed with its limitations. He then took up parkour and freerunning. He has since won first place in MTV's inaugural Ultimate Parkour Challenge, and is one of the most watched free runners with over 30 million views on YouTube.

== Philosophy ==
Ilabaca believes parkour is a global movement that will change the way people interact with their environment. To him all ways of being free and expressing yourself are parkour. Furthermore, he emphasizes the power of choices in one's training. He states that falling is the result of choosing to fall: "Thinking you’re going to fail at something gives you a higher risk of doing just that. Committing to something you’re thinking or knowing you will land gives you a higher chance of landing or completing the task."

== Film/TV appearances ==
- Top Gear (2006)
  In episode 7 of the 8th season of Top Gear, Daniel and Kerbie took part in a challenge to race a Peugeot 207 through the busy city centre of Liverpool. In the episode, the traceurs won.
- Eric Sheridan Prydz vs. Pink Floyd - "Proper Education" (music video, 2006)
  Daniel performed parkour, stunts and other various action moves while dressed in a school uniform which promoted the theme of saving the environment.
- Parkour Journeys (2006)
  Daniel featured in the Parkour Journeys DVD documentary, in a section called "Daniel Ilabaca in Profile", which featured an interview and footage of him training.
- Pierre David Guetta vs. The Egg - "Love Don't Let Me Go (Walking Away)" (music video, 2007)
  Along with several members of 3RUN, Daniel performed several parkour moves around Elephant & Castle.
- UEFA Champions' League Advert (advert, 2008)
  Daniel Ilabaca and Ryan Doyle were among the free runners appearing in a commercial shown regularly on Sky Sports to promote the Champions' League, in which they performed various tricks and martial arts kicks on a computer-generated football around central London's South Bank.
- The Chemical Brothers - "Midnight Madness" (music video, 2008)
  The video is set in a back alley and warehouse in London, United Kingdom. It begins with a Daniel playing a goblin, who jumps out of a dumpster, and starts dancing. His dancing takes him out of the alley and up onto the nearby rooftops, then into a theatre. The goblin begins breakdancing on the stage. He exits, jumps onto a police car, and rides it back to the dumpster, when he jumps in moments before a man walks into the alley and dumps a bag of trash into the dumpster.
- MTV's Ultimate Parkour Challenge (2009–2010)
  Daniel Ilabaca was the winner of the inaugural Ultimate Parkour Challenge, winning the $10,000 prize.
- The European Parkour Tour 2010 (2010)
  Daniel Ilabaca traveled across 4,000 miles to eight major cities to meet some of Europe's best free runners. From each city, short films and interviews with the local freerunning community were made. He visited London, Amsterdam, Cologne, Copenhagen, Vienna, Milan, Barcelona and Paris – all in three weeks.
- Misfits (2010)
  In the first series, Daniel played "Superhoodie", a recurring character who monitors and plays a guardian role outside the circle of already established characters. He is an onlooker and an outsider, with traits such as athletic ability and care being amplified since the storm in episode 1.
- Kolpingtag: Mut (Courage) (2015)
  Trailer for the "Kolpingtag" a German Christian society.
