= Casino Royale (2006 film) =

2006 James Bond film by Martin Campbell

- British theatrical release poster
- Directed by: Martin Campbell
- Screenplay by: Neal Purvis Robert Wade; Paul Haggis
- Based on: Casino Royale by Ian Fleming
- Produced by: Michael G. Wilson; Barbara Broccoli
- Starring: Daniel Craig; Eva Green; Mads Mikkelsen; Jeffrey Wright; Judi Dench
- Cinematography: Phil Méheux
- Edited by: Stuart Baird
- Music by: David Arnold
- Production companies: Metro-Goldwyn-Mayer; Columbia Pictures; Eon Productions Limited
- Distributed by: Sony Pictures Releasing
- Release dates: 14 November 2006 (Odeon Leicester Square); 16 November 2006 (United Kingdom); 17 November 2006 (United States); 23 November 2006 (Germany)
- Running time: 144 minutes
- Countries: United Kingdom; Germany; Czech Republic; United States
- Language: English
- Budget: $102–150 million
- Box office: $606 million

Casino Royale is a 2006 spy thriller film, the twenty-first in the James Bond series by Eon Productions, the third screen adaptation of Ian Fleming's 1953 novel of the same name, and the first to star Daniel Craig as the fictional MI6 agent James Bond.

The second entry in the film series to be directed by Martin Campbell, Casino Royale's screenplay was written by Neal Purvis, Robert Wade, and Paul Haggis; the film co-stars Eva Green, Mads Mikkelsen, Judi Dench, and Jeffrey Wright. In the film, Bond is on a mission to bankrupt the terrorism financier Le Chiffre (Mikkelsen) in a high-stakes poker game at the Casino Royale in Montenegro.

It is also the first Bond film not to be part of the franchise's original loose continuity. Following Die Another Day (2002), Eon decided to reboot the franchise, attempting to provide a realistic and darker exploration of a less experienced and more vulnerable Bond. Casting involved a widespread search for a new actor to succeed Pierce Brosnan as Bond; the choice of Daniel Craig, announced in October 2005, initially proved controversial. He was deemed controversial due to his "short stature", blond hair, blue eyes, and his lack of charisma. Principal photography took place in the Bahamas, Italy, the United Kingdom and the Czech Republic, with interior sets built at Pinewood Studios and Barrandov Studios, from January to July 2006. The film features primarily practical stuntwork as opposed to the computer-generated placements seen in other Bond films.

Casino Royale premiered at the Odeon Leicester Square on 14 November 2006, and was theatrically released first in the United Kingdom on 16 November, and in the United States a day later, by Sony Pictures Releasing under the Columbia Pictures banner, the first Bond film to do so. The film received critical acclaim, with praise for Craig's reinvention of the character and the departure from the tropes of previous Bond films. It grossed over $606 million worldwide, becoming the fourth highest-grossing film of 2006 and the highest-grossing James Bond film until the release of Skyfall (2012). A sequel, Quantum of Solace, was released in 2008.

== Plot ==
MI6 operative James Bond is promoted to 00 agent after assassinating traitorous MI6 section chief Dryden and his contact in Prague. In Uganda, Mr. White introduces Steven Obanno, a commander of the Lord's Resistance Army, to Le Chiffre, an Albanian private banker to terrorists. Obanno entrusts Le Chiffre with $100 million to invest. Planning a terrorist attack on aerospace manufacturer Skyfleet, Le Chiffre uses Obanno's money to short the company's stock.

In Madagascar, Bond destroys an embassy while capturing and then killing a bomb maker named Mollaka. M, the head of MI6, chastises Bond for causing an international incident and ignoring her orders to take Mollaka alive. Information on Mollaka's phone leads Bond to corrupt Greek official Alex Dimitrios, who had hired Mollaka at Le Chiffre's request to bomb Skyfleet's prototype airliner. In the Bahamas, Bond seduces Dimitrios' wife and learns that he is going to Miami International Airport. He follows Dimitrios there and kills him, then chases down the new bomber Dimitrios had hired and prevents the destruction of the airliner. With Skyfleet's prototype secure, Le Chiffre's stock shorting scheme fails, losing over $100 million.

To recoup his clients' money, Le Chiffre organises a Texas hold 'em tournament at the Casino Royale in Montenegro. MI6 enters Bond—the agency's best poker player—in the tournament, believing a defeat will force Le Chiffre to seek asylum with the British government in exchange for information on his clients. Bond is paired with Vesper Lynd, a British Treasury agent overseeing the $10 million buy-in. They meet their contact, French secret service agent René Mathis, in Montenegro. Obanno, furious over his failed investment, threatens Le Chiffre, but allows him to continue playing to win back the money. Obanno and his bodyguard discover and attack an eavesdropping Bond, who kills them both.

Bond grows confident when he detects Le Chiffre's tell, but loses his $10 million stake after Le Chiffre is tipped off. Vesper refuses to authorise an additional $5 million for Bond to continue, but fellow player and CIA agent Felix Leiter stakes Bond the money in exchange for letting the CIA arrest Le Chiffre. Le Chiffre's lover, Valenka, poisons Bond's drink, but Vesper rescues him. Bond returns to the game and wins the tournament. A desperate Le Chiffre kidnaps Vesper to trap Bond and takes them to an abandoned ship. He tortures Bond to reveal the password to the bank account holding his winnings, but Bond resists. White bursts in and kills Le Chiffre, but spares Bond and Vesper.

Bond awakens in hospital and recovers with Vesper at his side. He has Mathis arrested, believing that he had tipped off Le Chiffre about his tell. Bond falls in love with Vesper and resigns from MI6; the couple sail to Venice. When M reveals that his winnings were never transferred to the British treasury, Bond realises that Vesper has betrayed him and he tracks her to an exchange of the money. Gunmen spot him and take her captive inside a gutted Venetian palace undergoing restoration and supported by large flotation devices. Bond destroys the flotation devices, causing the palace to lurch and sink into the Grand Canal. While he kills the shooters, Vesper is trapped in an elevator cage as it submerges. Bond dives in to rescue her, but she locks herself in to prevent him and she drowns. Bond recovers her body but fails to resuscitate her, and White escapes with the money.

M informs Bond, who has returned to service, that the organisation behind Le Chiffre (Note: Later revealed to be named Quantum in the sequel, Quantum of Solace (2008), which is itself revealed to be a subsidiary of Spectre in the 2015 sequel of the same name) threatened to kill Vesper's lover unless she became a double agent. When Bond denounces Vesper as a traitor, M reasons that she likely made a deal with White by trading the winnings for Bond's life. Realising Vesper left her phone to help him, Bond checks her contacts and locates White at an estate in Lake Como. He shoots White in the leg to disable him and introduces himself: "The name's Bond, James Bond."

== Cast ==
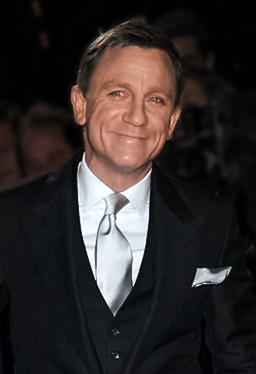
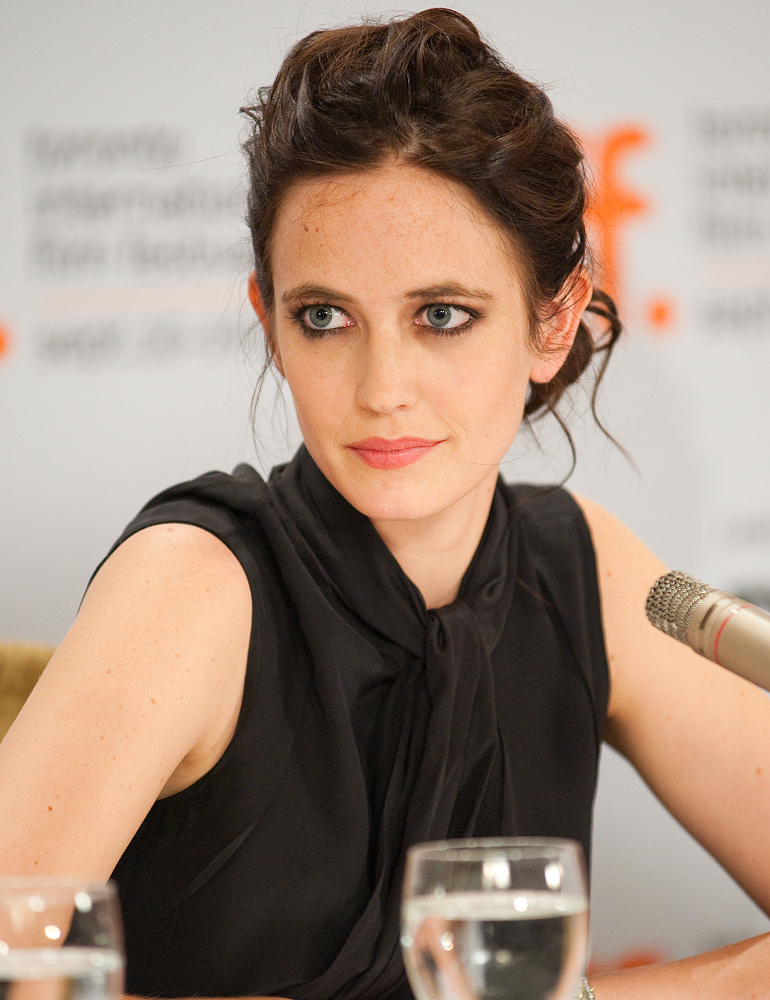
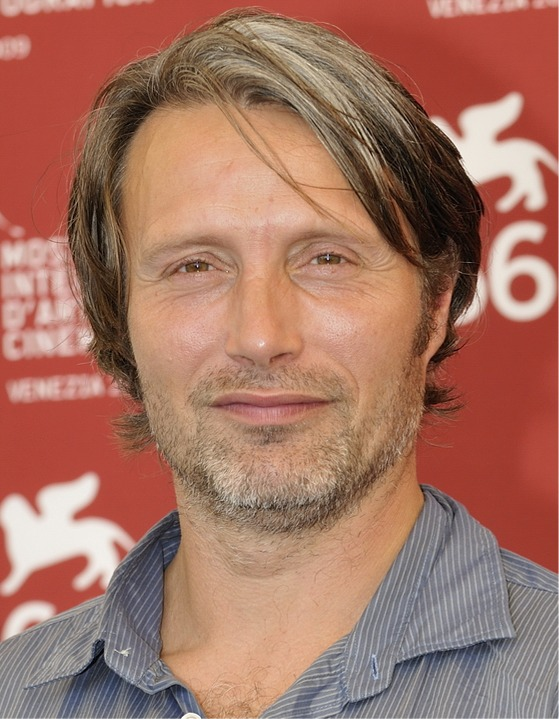
Daniel Craig (left) in 2008, Eva Green and Mads Mikkelsen (both in 2009)
- Daniel Craig as James Bond
- Eva Green as Vesper Lynd
- Mads Mikkelsen as Le Chiffre
- Judi Dench as M - only cast member retained from the Brosnan era
- Jeffrey Wright as Felix Leiter - first Eon era with Leiter played by a black actor. (Leiter was played by Bernie Casey in Never Say Never Again)
- Giancarlo Giannini as René Mathis
- Caterina Murino as Solange Dimitrios
- Simon Abkarian as Alex Dimitrios
- Isaach de Bankolé as Steven Obanno
- Jesper Christensen as Mr. White
- Ivana Miličević as Valenka
- Tobias Menzies as Villiers - M's MI6 HQ secretary
- Claudio Santamaria as Carlos - terrorist hired to destroy Skyfleet prototype
- Sébastien Foucan as Mollaka, credited in opening title cards under "Free running stunts"
- Malcolm Sinclair as Dryden
- Richard Sammel as Gettler - Quantum agent
- Ludger Pistor as Mendel - Swiss banker who collected / distributed poker game funds
- Joseph Millson as Carter - MI6 agent aiding Bond in Madagascar
- Darwin Shaw as Fisher - Dryden's contact who was receiving stolen company secrets
- Clemens Schick as Kratt - LeChiffre's bodyguard
- Emmanuel Avena as Leo - Quantum agent
- Tom Chadbon as Stockbroker

Casino Royale players:

- Ade as Infante
- Urbano Barberini as Tomelli
- Tsai Chin as Madame Wu
- Charlie Levi Leroy as Gallardo
- Lazar Ristovski as Kaminofsky
- Tom So as Fukutu
- Veruschka as Gräfin von Wallenstein
- Andreas Daniel as the dealer
- Carlos Leal as the tournament director

== Production ==
=== Development ===
Casino Royale had been produced as a 1954 television episode starring Barry Nelson as Bond and Peter Lorre as the villain Le Chiffre, as well as a 1967 ensemble satirical film starring David Niven, Peter Sellers and Woody Allen. Eon Productions gained the rights to Casino Royale in 1999 after Sony Pictures exchanged them for Metro-Goldwyn-Mayer's rights to Spider-Man. Director Quentin Tarantino expressed interest in making an adaptation of Casino Royale, keeping Brosnan as Bond, but Eon was not interested. He claims to have worked behind the scenes with the Fleming family after doing Pulp Fiction, intent on making a Casino Royale set in the 1960s with no connections to the Eon films, and believed this was the reason why filmmakers finally went ahead with Casino Royale.

In March 2004, Neal Purvis and Robert Wade began writing a screenplay for Pierce Brosnan as Bond, aiming to bring back the flavour of Ian Fleming's original Bond novels. An early draft featured Bond backpacking in Madagascar and playing chess with Lord Lucan. As the drafts became closer to being finalised, the opening scene in which Bond earns his 00 licence was originally going to consist of an adaptation of either the short stories "The Hildebrand Rarity" or "007 in New York". While trying to use the story of the latter, featuring Bond meeting former secret service staffer Solange, the writers decided to reuse her name for the first woman Bond encounters. Producers Barbara Broccoli and Michael G. Wilson thought that "Die Another Day had become too fantastical", feeling the next film should be more realistic. Later that same year, Sony led a consortium that purchased MGM, allowing Sony to gain distribution rights starting with the film. Broccoli also felt that the "frivolity" of the preceding films was not appropriate after the 9/11 attacks.

In February 2005 Martin Campbell, who previously directed GoldenEye (1995), was announced as the film's director. Campbell was the third director considered for the film, after producer Chris McGurk suggested Matthew Vaughn, who Broccoli and Wilson thought to not have enough experience, and Eon sent the book and script to Roger Michell, who declined the invite. Vaughn later said that while Eon never invited him, he was contacted by MGM about the film. Campbell felt the script draft needed a rewrite, and suggested hiring Paul Haggis, whose main contribution was to rewrite the climax of the film. Haggis explained, "the draft that was there was very faithful to the book and there was a confession, so in the original draft, the character confessed and killed herself. She then sent Bond to chase after the villains; Bond chased the villains into the house. I don't know why but I thought that Vesper had to be in the sinking house and Bond has to want to kill her and then try and save her." Haggis also said they wanted "to do for Bond what Batman Begins did for Batman". Haggis started working in August 2005 and spent six weeks writing, two with each act.

Eon believed that it had relied too heavily on computer-generated imagery effects in the more recent films, particularly Die Another Day, and was keen to accomplish the stunts in Casino Royale "the old fashioned way". In keeping with this drive for more realism, screenwriters Purvis, Wade and Haggis wanted the script to follow as closely as possible the original 1953 novel, keeping Fleming's darker storyline and characterisation of Bond. Campbell declared that the only element of the novel that could not be used was the Cold War setting featuring SMERSH as the antagonists, and "pretty much the last 2/3rds of the movie will be like the book". Purvis and Wade said the first concept they had to figure out was how to update Le Chiffre without the Soviet backstory, landing on a banker financing terrorism. The predecessor concept to the bombing of the Skyfleet jet was a hijacking of a cruise ship in Cape Town. The location of Casino Royale itself was changed from Northern France to an unnamed city in Montenegro, "somewhere that seemed to be out of reach of the international banking authorities". Due to copyright issues related to the ownership of Thunderball, the organisation of which Mr. White is a part is not initially established as SPECTRE. (This would later be retconned in the titular 2015 film.)

=== Casting ===
Pierce Brosnan fulfilled his original contract for four Bond films with Die Another Day (2002), and the producers invited him to return for a fifth film and he was in negotiations to star in Casino Royale. Screenwriters Purvis and Wade confirmed that their Casino Royale script was written with Brosnan in mind, before they realised the story worked better with a young man, restarting the story of Bond. Yet while Brosnan was working on After the Sunset in The Bahamas, his agent informed him that negotiations had broken down with Eon Productions. The producers were not quite sure what they wanted to do, and contacted Brosnan the following week. During their phone conversation, Brosnan asked if he still had the role. Broccoli began to cry and responded, "We're so sorry", while Wilson was stoic and said, "You were a great James Bond". Later reports cited Brosnan's salary request as the reason he lost the role.

Over 200 actors were considered as Brosnan's replacement, and the list was later narrowed down to 10 actors. The auditions had high production values, featuring sets, cinematography and music by the same professionals that later worked on the film. Hugh Jackman and Christian Bale were approached for the role, but both turned it down. Jackman wanted to focus on other projects and Bale was not interested in starring in a franchise that he felt was "very British". Clive Owen was approached for the role multiple times, but turned it down as he did not know what he could add to the character, calling the role a "golden prison". David Tennant was reportedly considered at one point, although Tennant himself did not know this until years later. Campbell and the casting directors Janet Hirshenson and Jane Jenkins recalled meeting with Alex O'Loughlin, Julian McMahon, Ewan McGregor, Rupert Friend and Antony Starr to discuss the role. Casting director Debbie McWilliams felt that the candidates for Bond in their 20s lacked charisma and maturity. Other actors who auditioned included Karl Urban, Sam Worthington, Dougray Scott, Sam Heughan, Matthew Rhys, Michael Fassbender, and Goran Višnjić, who auditioned for the role the same day as Daniel Craig, but was reportedly unable to master an English accent. Media outlets reported that Craig, Višnjić, Worthington, and Henry Cavill were the four finalists in September 2005. Years after Craig was cast as Bond, Campbell said Cavill was the only other actor in serious contention for the role and had a "tremendous" audition, but at 22 years old, he was considered too young.

After watching Layer Cake, McGurk had suggested Daniel Craig for a possible villain. After a screening, Broccoli instead found Craig to be the best choice for Bond himself. Fassbender had also suggested Craig for the role after his audition. Craig had been speculated for the role since 2004, when he rejected the idea of starring, as he felt the series had descended into formula. During promotion for Layer Cake in May 2005, Craig addressed the rumours saying he had not been contacted by the Broccolis yet. Once finally approached by the producers, Craig had meetings where he heard of their new approach, while responding he could make no commitment until given a script. Wilson stated that the screenplay was only sent to Craig "until it had gone quite a way towards what we thought would be the final" given the actor's favoritism, during which other actors remained being tested to have a backup ready. As soon as Haggis delivered his final draft in September 2005 it was sent to Craig, who liked the script and was brought for an audition. Campbell noted Craig was exhausted having just been flown to London from the filming of The Invasion in Baltimore, with Craig recalling "my eyes were just swimming". The actor thought his test was bad and the director was not totally convinced, but Broccoli championed for him. Craig read all of Fleming's novels to prepare for the part, and cited Mossad and British Secret Service agents who served as advisers on the set of Munich as inspiring because, "Bond has just come out of the service and he's a killer. ... You can see it in their eyes, you know immediately: oh, hello, he's a killer. There's a look. These guys walk into a room and very subtly they check the perimeters for an exit. That's the sort of thing I wanted." Craig also worked out extensively to be able to do most stunts himself and "when [Bond] took his shirt off, to look like he could do the things that I was attempting to do."

On 14 October 2005 Eon Productions, Sony Pictures Entertainment and MGM announced that Craig would be the sixth actor to portray James Bond. Taking time off from reshoots for The Invasion, a business-suit clad, rather shag-haired Craig boarded a Royal Marines Rigid Raider from HMS Belfast before travelling to HMS President, where he was introduced to the world's press. Controversy followed the decision, with some critics and fans expressing doubt the producers had made the right choice. Throughout the entire production period, Internet campaigns such as "danielcraigisnotbond.com" expressed their dissatisfaction and threatened to boycott the film in protest. Craig, unlike previous actors, was not considered by the protesters to fit the tall, dark, handsome and charismatic image of Bond to which viewers had been accustomed. The Daily Mirror ran a front-page news story critical of Craig, with the headline "The Name's Bland – James Bland". Campbell defended Craig's casting likening it to the novel having Bond's appearance compared to Hoagy Carmichael. Craig was also asked to dye his hair brown for the role but he refused calling it "out of the question"; he instead suggested to cut his hair short for a more "brutal appearance".

The next important casting was that of the lead Bond girl, Vesper Lynd. McWilliams acknowledged actors Angelina Jolie and Charlize Theron were "strongly considered" for the role. The actor Cécile de France had also auditioned, but her English accent "wasn't up to scratch". The actress Audrey Tautou was also considered, but not chosen because of her role in The Da Vinci Code, which was another Columbia Pictures film released in May 2006. Rachel McAdams turned down a role in the film to focus on raising her own family. Olivia Wilde and Eva Green were the two finalists for the part. On 16 February 2006, Green was announced to play the part. McWilliams stated that she tried to follow the series tradition of lesser known actresses for Bond girls, including Ivana Miličević as Le Chiffre's girlfriend Valenka. She also declared that Mads Mikkelsen was cast as Le Chiffre filling her habit of choosing "a lot of people from the theatre and people from slightly more obscure stuff". Mikkelsen was invited due to his work in Open Hearts and Pusher trilogy, and while he missed two auditions due to being unable to leave a shoot in Prague, the producers eventually paid for Mikkelsen's trip to London for the test, where he and Craig performed the torture scene. Caterina Murino had fallen off a horse and broken a rib prior to auditioning 'completely under morphine' for Solange, and thus had to practice horse riding every day for a month to overcome her fear, given the character's first scene involved riding a horse along the beach. Judi Dench did not expect to return as M given other actors playing the MI6 staff such as Samantha Bond and Colin Salmon were dropped, and once invited was pleased to learn she would take part in location shooting. Campbell said that Dench was still the best actor for the role, specially as the film not being a traditional prequel made it not matter that she was older than in previous installments. Craig was "thrilled" to work with Dench, saying that the dynamic between Bond and M was that "at the beginning of the film, she is kind of the only person he cares about" and that as long as M controlled him "then he can be as bad as he is", while at the same time M "slightly regrets having put [Bond] on this road" due to all the ensuing misbehavior.

=== Filming ===
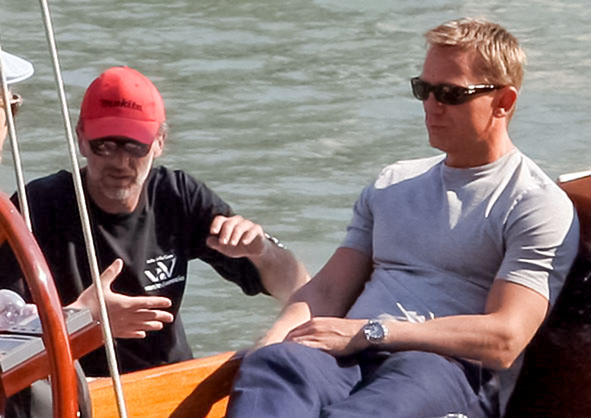
Craig with Michael G. Wilson in Venice during filming aboard SV Spirit

Principal photography for Casino Royale commenced on 27 January 2006 in Prague, with Green and Mikkelsen having not yet signed, and concluded on 20 July at Pinewood Studios, where the film used several stages, the paddock tank and the 007 Stage. Prague would be the primary filming location due to a lack of tax incentives by the British government. Filming began at Modrany Studios, with the scene in which Bond captures Mollaka at the embassy. By the middle of February, the film moved to its main base of operations, Barrandov Studios. Art director Peter Lamont, doing his ninth and final Bond film, created over forty sets for the film. A particularly elaborate set built at Barrandov was the stairwell where Bond fights Obanno and his bodyguard, featuring four flights of stairs in a set that went almost to the ceiling of the stage, and which cinematographer Phil Méheux ordered to have at each level a corridor hidden behind a frosted-glass window so as to have a light source that would not be easily visible compared to overhead lights.

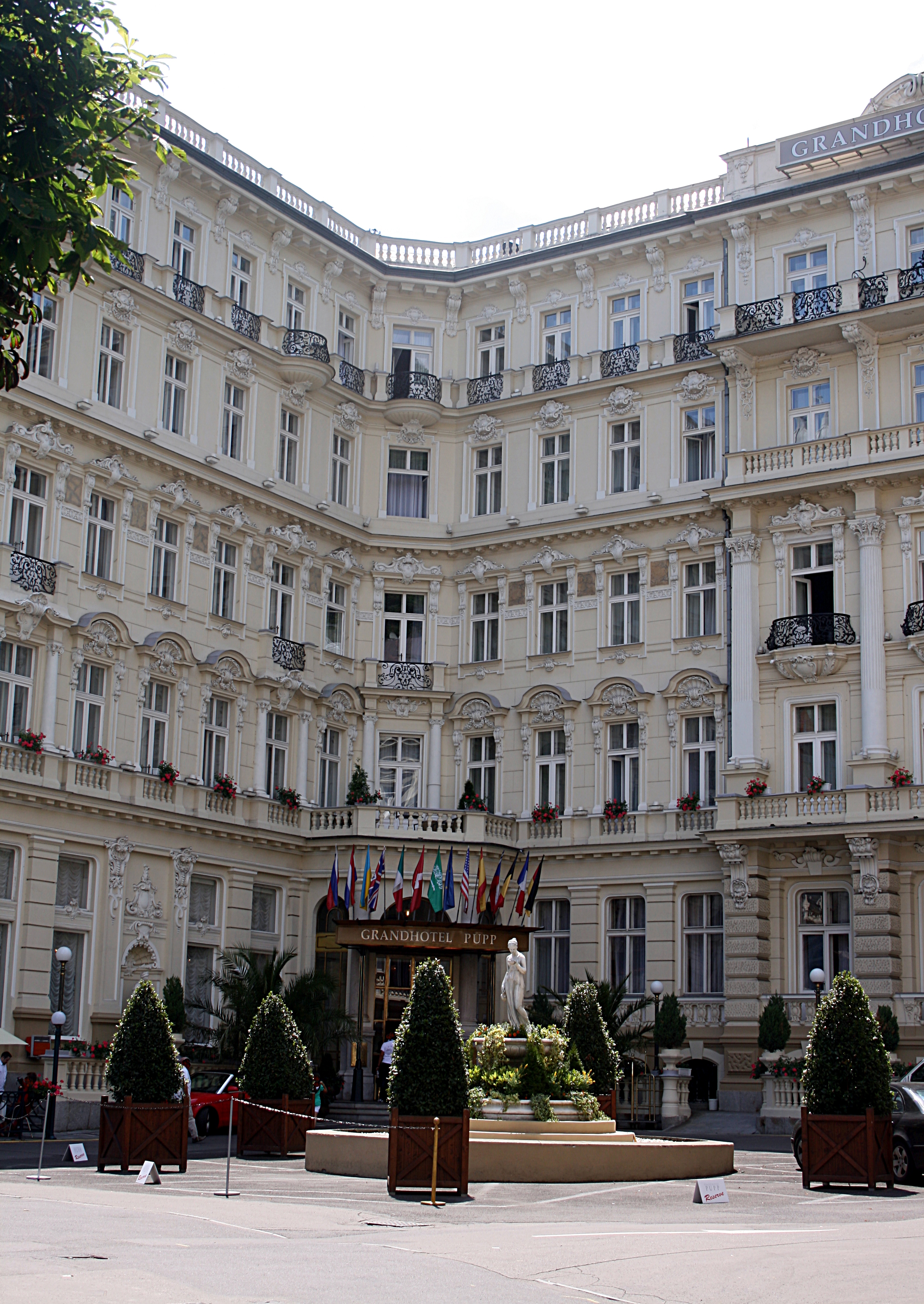
The Grandhotel Pupp, Karlovy Vary, Czech Republic

After Prague, the production moved to the Bahamas. Eon originally considered filming the Madagascar scenes in South Africa before just using the Bahamas, which also doubled for the Italian Riviera. Several locations around New Providence were used for filming during February and March, particularly on Paradise Island. The film then went to the United Kingdom, filming at Dunsfold Aerodrome in Surrey, the cricket pavilion at Eton College (although that scene was cut from the completed film) and the Millbrook Vehicle Proving Ground in Bedfordshire. Footage set in Mbale, Uganda, was filmed at Black Park, a country park in Buckinghamshire, on 4 July 2006. Additional scenes took place at Albany House, an estate owned by the golfers Ernie Els and Tiger Woods. The crew returned to the Czech Republic in April, and continued there, filming in Prague, Planá and Loket, before completing in the town of Karlovy Vary in May. Karlovy Vary was used as the exterior of the Casino Royale, with the Grandhotel Pupp serving as "Hotel Splendide". The locations were chosen as Trieste and the Croatian coastline did not have the large hotels surrounded by big boulevards wanted by the producers to make for an imposing location. Strahov Monastery doubled for the House of Commons when M meets Bond.

The main Italian location was Venice, where the majority of the film's ending is set. The scene with Bond on a sailboat was filmed aboard a 54-foot (16 m) yacht named Spirit. She was constructed by Spirit Yachts in Suffolk, England, and had to be demasted to fit under various Venetian bridges to reach the filming location. For this reason, according to the company, SV Spirit "was the first sailing boat to go up the Grand Canal in Venice for 300 years". Vesper wears a red dress as Bond follows her in tribute to Don't Look Now, and none of the extras in the scene wore red to make her more noticeable. Other scenes in the latter half of the film were shot in late May and early June at the Villa del Balbianello on the shores of Lake Como. Further exterior shooting for the film took place at properties such as the Villa La Gaeta, near the lakeside town of Menaggio.

A recreation of the Body Worlds exhibit in a Prague mausoleum provided a setting for one scene in the film. Among the Body Worlds plastinates featured in that scene were the Poker Playing Trio (which plays a key role in one scene) and Rearing Horse and Rider. The exhibition's developer and promoter, German anatomist Gunther von Hagens, also has a cameo appearance in the film, although only his trademark hat is visible on screen.

The film's opening sequence aimed to confound expectations of Bond fans by featuring a black and white segment with little action reminiscent of Cold War thrillers The Ipcress File and The Spy Who Came In from the Cold. Méheux recreated the Techniscope look with monochrome Super 35 reels and spherical lenses, and had to give each of the two kills different approaches for lighting: Dryden's room, filmed at an office building at the banks of the Vltava, had many hard sources, while the bathroom set replaced the ceiling with a big softbox so the white walls reflected the light. The footage of the fight also had added contrast and grain applied in order to amplify the violence, "making the scene very grainy and gritty."

Campbell noted that a big challenge was to "make 10 people around a table playing cards interesting" in three separate scenes. There was extensive rehearsal to properly determine how the actors would be positioned, and each scene was filmed differently, with one featuring a static camera, another with constant movement around the table, and finally one where a far camera slowly closes in on the characters. Campbell accidentally knocked down the game's wall in a crane, while midway filming the poker scene. Costume designer Lindy Hemming tried to make the gamblers wear "what the very richest people could have tailored as eveningwear", with an African version of a gambling evening suit, a Russian with a mink collar, an Argentinian with gold threads running through his suit, and the German heiress in Brioni.

=== Effects ===
In designing the credit sequence for the film, graphic designer Daniel Kleinman was inspired by the cover of the 1953 British first edition of Casino Royale, which featured Ian Fleming's original design of a playing card bordered by eight red hearts dripping with blood. Kleinman said, "The hearts not only represent cards but the tribulations of Bond's love story. So I took that as inspiration to use playing card graphics in different ways in the titles", like a club representing a puff of gun smoke, and slashed arteries spurting thousands of tiny hearts. In creating the shadow images of the sequence, Kleinman digitised the footage of Craig and the film's stuntmen on the Inferno visual effects system at Framestore CFC in London; the actors' silhouettes were incorporated into more than 20 digitally animated scenes depicting intricate and innovative card patterns. Kleinman decided not to use the female silhouettes commonly seen throughout the Bond title sequences, considering that the women did not fit with both the film's spirit and the storyline following Bond falling in love.

For the rest of the film, special effects and miniature effects supervisor Chris Corbould returned to a more realistic style of film making and significantly reduced digital effects. According to Corbould, "CGI is a great tool and can be very useful, but I will fight to the tooth and nail to do something for real. It's the best way to go". Visual effects supervisor Steven Begg noted that there were still more computer effects than expected: “Like a lot of big action films, it blossomed from a theoretical 80 shots to 550.” Three scenes involving primarily physical effects in the film were the chase at a building site in Madagascar, the Miami Airport chase sequence and the sinking Venetian house, with sets located on the Grand Canal and in Pinewood Studios.

Purvis was inspired to write a sequence featuring parkour after his wife produced documentary Jump London, and parkour founder Sébastien Foucan was cast as Mollaka. Campbell noted that the chase showcased how the free runner "ran and jumped like a ballet dancer" in contrast to how Bond had the strength but not the finesse. The building site chase was shot in the Bahamas on the site of a derelict hotel with which Michael G. Wilson had become acquainted in 1977 during the filming of The Spy Who Loved Me. Before settling on the hotel, executive producer looked for construction sites across several cities, including London and Cape Town, always having the issue that construction companies would not stop working for seven weeks to accommodate production. Given there were no available construction cranes in the United States due to the reconstruction of New Orleans, two 100 feet (30 m) cranes and a large mobile crane had to be shipped from the United Kingdom. In the scene, Bond drives a digger towards the building, slamming into the concrete plinth on which Mollaka is running. The stunt team built a model and put forward several ways in which the digger could conceivably take out the concrete, including taking out the pillar underneath. A section of the concrete wall was removed to fit the digger and reinforced with steel.

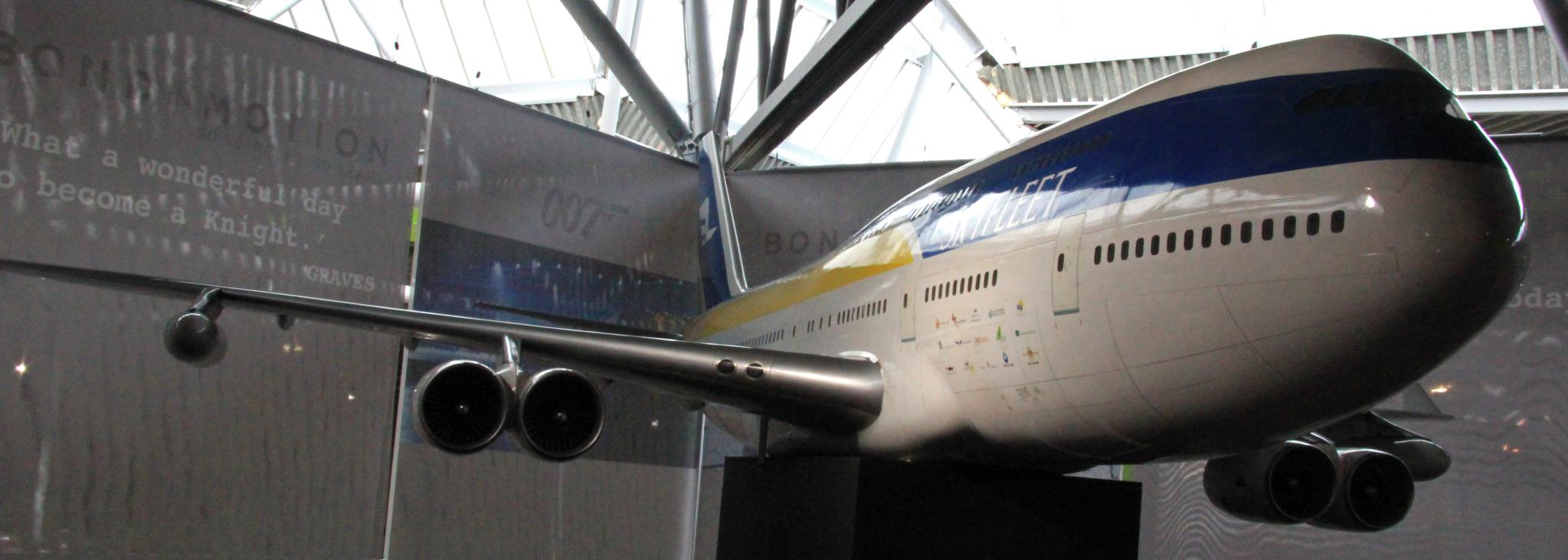
The modified Boeing-747 featured in the airport sequence as the fictional "Skyfleet S570".

The sequence at Miami International Airport took inspiration from the final action sequence of Heat. It was first filmed at Václav Havel Airport Prague in the middle of winter, with Hemming recalling that "the extras arrived in fur boots and big parkas" but "had to strip them off and wear shorts, sandals and T-shirts to look like Miami tourists". The stunts, including a petrol tanker crashing through various vehicles, were filmed across ten weeks at Dunsfold Aerodrome in Surrey, known from British car show Top Gear, and Méheux had to purchase 30 "daylight blue with a slight tinge of green" floodlights like the ones in Prague to make the lighting consistent in the Surrey footage. Footage taken at the actual Miami airport was digitally composited on the background and extended surroundings to make the location more accurate. In filming the scene in which the engine thrust of the moving aircraft blows the police car high into the air, second unit director and cinematographer Alexander Witt, with help from second unit first assistant director Terry Madden and special effects floor supervisor Ian Lowe, used a crane with a strong lead cable attached to the rear bumper of the vehicle to move it up and backwards at the moment of full extension away from the plane. The top half of the jet was created with computer graphics.

Concept artwork reveals the intention was to feature the forthcoming Airbus A380, but production delays held back its appearance in the film. Instead the fictional Skyfleet S570 aircraft in the film was an ex-British Airways 747-200B G-BDXJ, which had its engines removed and was modified for its appearance in the film. The modified aircraft had the outboard engines replaced by external fuel tanks, while the inboard engines were replaced by a mock-up pair of engines on each inboard pylon. The cockpit profile was altered to make the 747 look like a prototype of an advanced airliner, with Lamont pointing out he was influenced by the B-52.

The sinking of the Venetian house at the climax of the film featured the largest rig ever built for a Bond film, with a tank consisting of a Venetian piazza and the interior of an abandoned house being constructed. The rig, weighing some 90 metric tons (89 long tons; 99 short tons), incorporated electronics with hydraulic valves that were closely controlled by computer because of the dynamic movement within the system on its two axes. The same computer system also controlled the exterior model, which the effects team had built to one-third scale to film the building eventually collapsing into the Venetian canal. The model lift within the rig could be immersed in 19 feet (5.8 m) of water, and used banks of compressors to strictly regulate movement. Given the interiors were surrounded by a metal casing and some of the windows would be submerged as the house sank, lighting had to be done through skylights in the roof. The outside of the house combined plates filmed in Venice with 120 extras and bubble effects in the canal with a 25 feet (7.6 m) miniature of the villa.

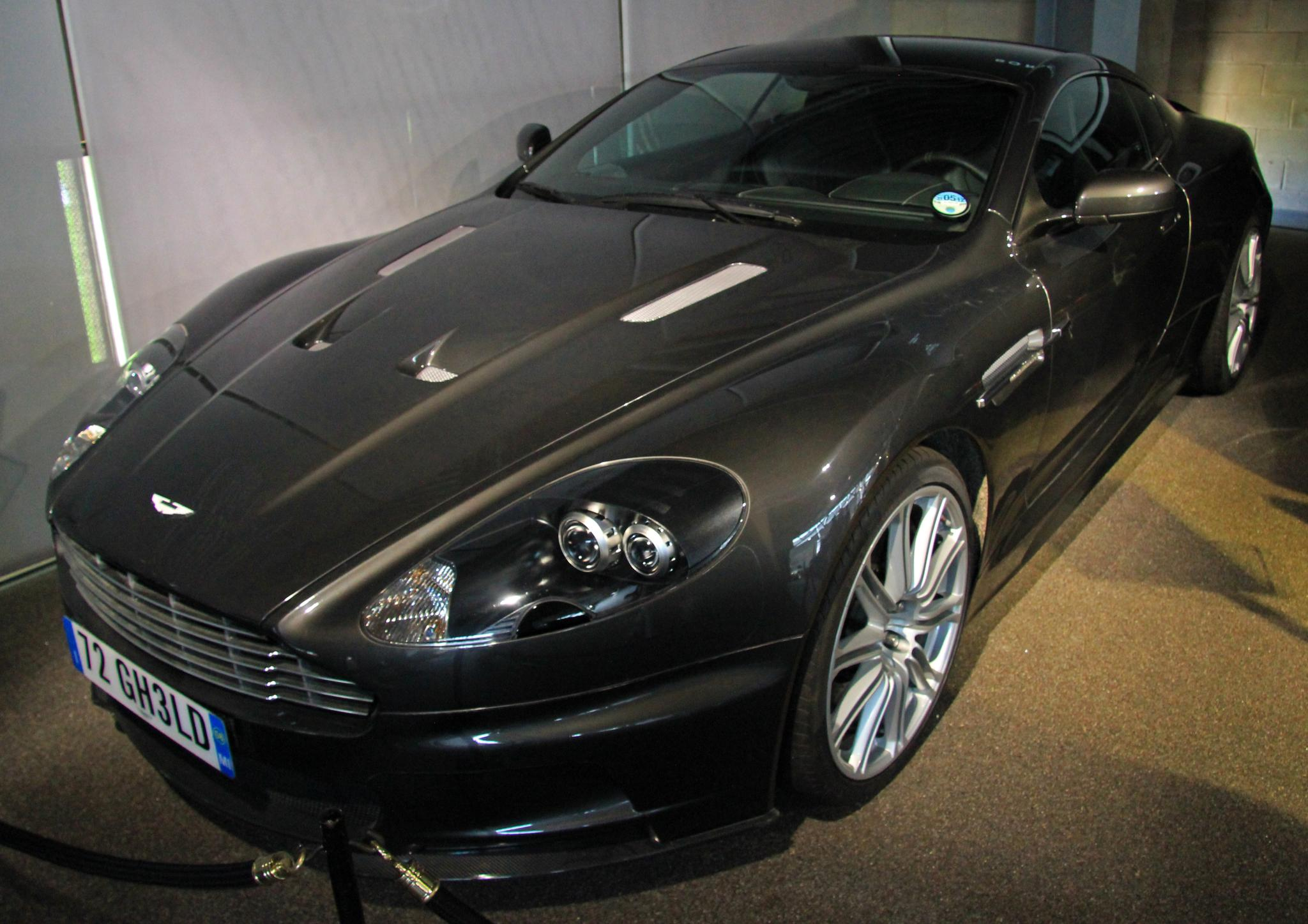
Aston Martin DBS driven by Bond in the film

At the time of filming, Aston Martin was still in the final phases of designing the DBS. Aston Martin delivered two working 'hero' cars to the film. In addition to the two 'hero' cars, Aston Martin had to prepare, and reinforce to withstand impact, three former development DB9s for use as DBS look-a-like stunt cars for the scene involving the car crash. Also a white prototype DB9 manual was supplied to the film crew so that the stunt drivers had something to practice with. Owing to the low centre of gravity of the vehicle, an 18-inch (450 mm) ramp had to be implemented on the road tarmac at Millbrook Proving Grounds and Adam Kirley, the stunt driver who performed the stunt, had to use an air cannon located behind the driver's seat to propel the car into a roll at the precise moment of impact. At a speed exceeding 70 miles per hour (110 km/h), the car rotated seven times while being filmed, and was confirmed by the Guinness Book of Records in November 2006 as a new world record.

=== Music ===
The soundtrack of Casino Royale, released by Sony Classical Records on 14 November 2006, featured music composed by veteran composer David Arnold, his fourth soundtrack for the Bond film series, while Nicholas Dodd orchestrated and conducted the score. Producers Michael G. Wilson and Barbara Broccoli announced on 26 July 2006 Chris Cornell had composed and would perform the title song, "You Know My Name". The song's main notes are played throughout the film as a substitute for the James Bond Theme, to represent Bond's youth and inexperience. The classic theme only plays in full during the end credits to signal the climax of his character arc.

== Release ==
Casino Royale premiered at the Odeon Leicester Square, the Odeon West End and the Empire simultaneously in London on 14 November 2006. It marked the 60th Royal Film Performance and benefited the Cinema & Television Benevolent Fund (CTBF), whose patron, Queen Elizabeth II, was in attendance with the Duke of Edinburgh. Along with the cast and crew, numerous celebrities and 5,000 paying guests were also in attendance with half the proceeds benefiting the CTBF. The film had to cut some of Le Chiffre's sadism and James Bond's reactions in the torture scene to get the desired BBFC 12A rating.

Only two days following the premiere, pirated copies appeared for sale in London. "The rapid appearance of this film on the streets shows the sophistication and organisation behind film piracy in the UK", said Kieron Sharp from the Federation Against Copyright Theft. Infringing copies of the DVD were selling in Beijing for 10 yuan (US$1.30; €1).

In January 2007 Casino Royale became the first Bond film ever to be shown in mainland Chinese cinemas. The Chinese version was edited before release, with the reference to the Cold War re-dubbed and new dialogue added during the poker scene explaining the process of Texas hold 'em, as the game is less familiar in China (this addition is reminiscent of dialogue that was added to the 1954 American TV adaptation to explain the rules of baccarat, the game featured in the original book). Casino Royale has earned approximately $11.7 million in China since its opening on 30 January on 468 screens, including a record opening weekend collection for a non-Chinese film, with $1.5 million.

=== Marketing ===
After critics dubbed Die Another Day "Buy Another Day" because of around 20 product placement deals, Eon limited their promotions for Casino Royale. In a reported £14 million deal with Ford, Ford's 2007 model Mondeo appeared in the film, driven by Bond. Both Sony and Sony Ericsson also made deals, making prominent appearances of tech products in the film including a Blu-ray player, Vaio laptop, Cyber-shot camera, Walkman NW-HD5 digital music player and a Sony Ericsson K800i handset. Other partners included Heineken (for which Eva Green starred in adverts), Smirnoff, Omega SA, and Virgin Atlantic.

=== Home media ===
Casino Royale was simultaneously released on DVD, UMD and Blu-ray by Sony Pictures Home Entertainment on 16 March 2007. In the UK the film was released on 16 March 2007 on DVD and Blu-ray Disc. The DVD and Blu-ray Disc releases broke sales records: the Region 1 Blu-ray Disc edition became the highest selling high-definition title to date, selling more than 100,000 copies since its release. The film held the records for having the highest first week Blu-ray sales and being Sony's best-selling release on that format until Spider-Man 3 replaced it that fall. The region 2 DVD edition achieved the record of fastest selling title for its first-week release. The UK DVD has continued to sell well, with 1,622,852 copies sold since 19 March. A copy of the Blu-ray Disc edition of Casino Royale was given out to the first 500,000 PAL PlayStation 3 owners who signed up to the PlayStation Network. The DVD was released in a separate two-disc widescreen and full screen editions, both of which includes the official music video for the film, and three documentaries detailing how Daniel Craig was chosen for the role of Bond, the filming and an expanded version of the Bond Girls Are Forever documentary incorporating new interviews with Casino Royale cast members. Casino Royale was released on 4K UHD Blu-ray on 25 February 2020.

== Reception ==
=== Box office ===
Upon its release in the United Kingdom, Casino Royale broke series records on both opening day—£1.7 million—and opening weekend—£13,370,969. At the end of its box-office run, the film had grossed £55.4 million, making it the most successful film of the year in the UK, and in 2012 ranked as the tenth-highest-grossing film of all time in the country. Casino Royale earnt an extra £8 million in 2019 through a Secret Cinema interactive theatrical experience.

On its US opening day, Casino Royale was on top with $14.7 million; throughout the weekend, it grossed a total of $40.8 million, ranking narrowly second behind Happy Feet. However, Casino Royale was playing in 370 fewer cinemas and had a better average ($11,890 per cinema, against $10,918 for Happy Feet). It earned $167.4 million by the end of its run in North America, becoming the highest-grossing film of the series, before being surpassed by Quantum of Solace's $168.4 million.

On 18 November 2006, Casino Royale opened at the first position in 27 countries, with a weekend gross of $43.4 million in the non-UK, Irish, US and Canada markets. The film retained the top spot at the worldwide box office for four weeks. The film earned $167.4 million in the United States and Canada and $438.6 million from international territories, for a total of $606 million worldwide. It was the fourth-highest-grossing film of 2006. It was the highest-grossing instalment of the James Bond series until Skyfall surpassed it in November 2012. After subsequent re-releases, it has earned over $616 million.

=== Critical response ===
On review aggregator website Rotten Tomatoes, the film received an approval rating of 94% based on 266 reviews, with an average rating of 7.9/10. The site's critical consensus reads, "Casino Royale disposes of the silliness and gadgetry that plagued recent James Bond outings, and Daniel Craig delivers what fans and critics have been waiting for: a caustic, haunted, intense reinvention of 007." On Metacritic, the film has a weighted average score of 80 out of 100 based on 46 critics, indicating "generally favorable" reviews. Audiences polled by CinemaScore gave the film an average grade of "A−" on an A+ to F scale.

Craig's performance and credibility were particularly praised. During production, Craig had been subject to debate by the media and the public, as he did not appear to fit Ian Fleming's original portrait of the character as tall, dark and suave. The Daily Telegraph compared the quality of Craig's characterisation of Bond to Sean Connery's and praised the script as smartly written, noting how the film departed from the series' conventions. The Times compared Craig's portrayal of the character to that of Timothy Dalton and praised the action as "edgy", with another reviewer citing in particular the action sequence involving the cranes in Madagascar. Critics Paul Arendt of BBC Films, Kim Newman of Empire, and Todd McCarthy of Variety all described Craig as the first actor to truly embody Ian Fleming's James Bond from the original novel: ironic, brutal and cold. Arendt commented, "Craig is the first actor to really nail 007's defining characteristic: he's an absolute swine".

The film was similarly well received in North America. MSNBC gave the film a perfect 5 star rating. The film was described as taking James Bond "back to his roots", similar to From Russia with Love, where the focus was on character and plot rather than the high-tech gadgets and visual effects that were strongly criticised in Die Another Day. Entertainment Weekly named the film as the fifth best of the series, and chose Vesper Lynd as the fourth best Bond girl in the series. Some newspaper columnists and critics were impressed enough by Craig's performance to consider him a viable candidate for an Academy Award nomination.

Roger Ebert gave the film a four out of four star rating, and wrote that "Craig makes a superb Bond ... who gives the sense of a hard man, wounded by life and his job, who nevertheless cares about people and right and wrong", and that the film "has the answers to all (his) complaints about the 45-year-old James Bond series", specifically "why nobody in a Bond movie ever seems to have any real emotions". Time Out New York's Joshua Rothkopf called Craig "the best Bond in the franchise's history", citing the actor's "crisp, hateful, Mamet-worthy snarl ... This is a screwed-up Bond, a rogue Bond, a bounder, a scrapper and, in the movie's astoundingly bleak coda, an openhearted lover."

Vicky Allan of the Sunday Herald noted Bond himself, and not his love interests, was sexually objectified in this film: A moment where he rises from the sea is reminiscent of Ursula Andress in Dr. No; he feels "skewered" by Vesper Lynd's criticism of him; "and though it would be almost unthinkable now to have a female character in a mainstream film stripped naked and threatened with genital mutilation, that is exactly what happens to Bond in [the film]." So although the film backed off from past criticism of Bond girls being sex objects, "the once invincible James Bond becomes just another joint at the meat market." This sentiment is shared by the University of Leicester's James Chapman, author of Licence to Thrill, who also notes Craig's Bond is "not yet the polished article"; he felt his incarnation of Bond is close to Fleming's because he is "humourless", but is also different because "Fleming's Bond did not enjoy killing; Craig's Bond seems almost to relish it." Andrew Sarris of The New York Observer wrote that this particular Bond film is "the very first that I would seriously consider placing on my own yearly 10-best list. Furthermore, I consider Daniel Craig to be the most effective and appealing of the six actors who have played 007, and that includes even Sean Connery."

Roger Moore wrote, "Daniel Craig impressed me so greatly in his debut outing, Casino Royale, by introducing a more gritty, unrefined edge to the character that I thought Sean [Connery] might just have to move over. Craig's interpretation was like nothing we'd seen on screen before; Jimmy Bond was earning his stripes and making mistakes. It was intriguing to see him being castigated by M, just like a naughty schoolboy would be by his headmaster. The script showed him as a vulnerable, troubled, and flawed character. Quite the opposite to my Bond! Craig was, and is, very much the Bond Ian Fleming had described in the books – a ruthless killing machine. It was a Bond that the public wanted." Moore also quipped that his praise was "not heaped lightly", because he had to purchase the DVD himself. Raymond Benson, the author of nine Bond novels, called Casino Royale "a perfect Bond film".

The film met with mixed reactions from other critics. John Beifuss of The Commercial Appeal said, "Who wants to see Bond learn a lesson about ego, as if he were Greg Brady in his 'Johnny Bravo' phase?" Anthony Lane of The New Yorker criticised the more imperfect and self-aware depiction of the character, saying, "Even James Bond, in other words, wants to be 007."

American radio personality Michael Medved gave the film three stars out of four, describing it as "intriguing, audacious and very original ... more believable and less cartoonish, than previous 007 extravaganzas"; he commented further that the "sometimes sluggish pacing will frustrate some Bond fanatics". Critics such as Emanuel Levy concurred, feeling the ending was too long, and that the film's terrorist villains lacked depth, although he praised Craig and gave the film a B+ overall. Other reviewers responded negatively, including Tim Adams of The Observer, who felt the film came off uncomfortably in an attempt to make the series grittier.

In December 2006, Casino Royale was named the best film of the year by viewers of Film 2006. In 2009, UK ice cream company Del Monte Superfruit Smoothies launched an ice pop lolly moulded to resemble the upper torso of Bond, a reference to the scene of him emerging from the sea. In 2008, Entertainment Weekly named Casino Royale the 19th-best film of the past 25 years.

In 2025, it was one of the films voted for the "Readers' Choice" edition of The New York Times' list of "The 100 Best Movies of the 21st Century", finishing at number 144.

=== Accolades ===
At the 2006 British Academy of Film and Television Arts Awards, Casino Royale won the Film Award for Best Sound (Chris Munro, Eddy Joseph, Mike Prestwood Smith, Martin Cantwell, Mark Taylor) and the Orange Rising Star Award, which was won by Eva Green. The film was nominated for eight BAFTA awards, including the Alexander Korda Award for Best British Film of the Year; Best Screenplay (Neal Purvis, Robert Wade, Paul Haggis); the Anthony Asquith Award for Best Film Music (David Arnold); Best Cinematography (Phil Méheux); Best Editing (Stuart Baird); Best Production Design (Peter Lamont, Simon Wakefield); Best Achievement in Special Visual Effects (Steve Begg, Chris Corbould, John Paul Docherty, Ditch Doy); and Best Actor (Daniel Craig). This made Craig the first actor ever to receive a BAFTA nomination for a performance as James Bond. He also received the Evening Standard British Film Award for Best Actor.

Casino Royale won the Excellence in Production Design Award from the Art Directors Guild, and singer Chris Cornell's "You Know My Name" won the International Press Academy Satellite Award for Best Original Song. The film won the Saturn Awards for Best Action/Adventure/Thriller Film, while also receiving nominations for Best Actor (Daniel Craig), Best Supporting Actress (Eva Green), Best Writing (Purvis, Wade and Haggis) and Best Music (David Arnold). Rotten Tomatoes' 2006 Golden Tomato Awards named Casino Royale the Wide Release Film of the Year. Casino Royale was also nominated for, and has won, many other international awards for its screenplay, film editing, visual effects, and production design. At the 2007 Saturn Awards, the film was declared to be the Best Action/Adventure/Thriller film of 2006. Several members of the crew were also recipients of 2007 Taurus World Stunt Awards, including Gary Powell for Best Stunt Coordination and Ben Cooke, Kai Martin, Marvin Stewart-Campbell and Adam Kirley for Best High Work.

Award	Category	Recipients	Result
American Cinema Editors Awards	Best Edited Feature Film – Dramatic	Stuart Baird	Nominated
Art Directors Guild Awards	Excellence in Production Design for a Contemporary Film	Peter Lamont	Won
British Academy Film Awards	Best Actor in a Leading Role	Daniel Craig	Nominated
British Academy Film Awards	Best Adapted Screenplay	Neal Purvis, Robert Wade and Paul Haggis	Nominated
British Academy Film Awards	Best Cinematography	Phil Méheux	Nominated
British Academy Film Awards	Best Editing	Stuart Baird	Nominated
British Academy Film Awards	Best Original Music	David Arnold	Nominated
British Academy Film Awards	Best Production Design	Peter Lamont, Lee Sandales and Simon Wakefield	Nominated
British Academy Film Awards	Best Sound	Chris Munro, Eddy Joseph, Mike Prestwood Smith, Martin Cantwell and Mark Taylor	Won
British Academy Film Awards	Best Special Visual Effects	Steve Begg, Chris Corbould, John Paul Docherty and Ditch Doy	Nominated
British Academy Film Awards	Outstanding British Film	Michael G. Wilson, Barbara Broccoli, Martin Campbell, Neal Purvis, Robert Wade and Paul Haggis	Nominated
Costume Designers Guild Awards	Excellence in Contemporary Film	Lindy Hemming	Nominated
Satellite Awards	Best Original Song	"You Know My Name" (Chris Cornell, David Arnold)	Won
Saturn Awards	Best Action or Adventure Film	Casino Royale	Won
Saturn Awards	Best Actor	Daniel Craig	Nominated
Saturn Awards	Best Supporting Actress	Eva Green	Nominated
Saturn Awards	Best Writing	Neal Purvis, Robert Wade and Paul Haggis	Nominated
Saturn Awards	Best Music	David Arnold	Nominated
Visual Effects Society Awards	Outstanding Special Effects in a Feature Motion Picture	Chris Corbould, Peter Notley, Ian Lowe and Roy Quinn	Won

== See also ==
- Outline of James Bond

== Notes ==
b. Quotes:

== Bibliography ==
- Field, Matthew; Chowdhury, Ajay (2015). Some Kind of Hero: The Remarkable Story of the James Bond Films. Stroud: The History Press. ISBN 978-0-7509-6421-0 – via Internet Archive text collection.
