= Nick Cave's Veiled World =

2025 British television documentary film

- Directed by: Mike Christie
- Country of origin: United Kingdom
- Original language: English

Production
- Producer: Seb Barfield
- Production company: Supercollider (Zinc Media)

Original release
- Network: Sky Arts; Sky Documentaries service NOW
- Release: 6 December 2025

Nick Cave's Veiled World is a 2025 British documentary film about musician and songwriter Nick Cave. Directed by Mike Christie and produced by Seb Barfield, the film explores Cave's creative process through contributions from collaborators, friends and admirers. It premiered on 6 December 2025 on Sky Arts, Sky Documentaries and streaming service NOW.

== Synopsis ==
The documentary examines recurring archetypal figures in Cave's work and considers how personal experience, grief and spirituality have shaped his songwriting and artistic output. It is structured in chapters and is told primarily through interviews and commentary from collaborators and peers.

== Contributors ==
According to Sky, contributors include musicians Florence Welch, Flea, Colin Greenwood and Warren Ellis; filmmakers Wim Wenders, Andrew Dominik, John Hillcoat, Iain Forsyth and Jane Pollard; designer Bella Freud; writer Irvine Welsh; and former Archbishop of Canterbury Rowan Williams.

== Production ==
Nick Cave's Veiled World was produced by Supercollider, a Zinc Media company. Mike Christie served as director and Seb Barfield as producer. Sky credited Barbara Lee as commissioning editor and Charlotte Mardon-Heath as executive producer for Sky Studios. Televisual published a first-look item about the programme ahead of its broadcast.

== Release ==
The film premiered at 9pm on 6 December 2025 on Sky Arts, Sky Documentaries and streaming service NOW.

== Reception ==
In The Independent, Roisin O'Connor wrote that the documentary focuses on Cave's songwriting process and is structured in chapters. In The Guardian, Lucy Mangan described it as an unconventional documentary that avoids a standard retrospective approach and instead explores Cave's work through themed segments. The Guardian also included the programme in its TV listings for the day.

According to Sky, contributors include musicians Florence Welch, Flea, Colin Greenwood and Warren Ellis; filmmakers Wim Wenders, Andrew Dominik, John Hillcoat, Iain Forsyth and Jane Pollard; designer Bella Freud; writer Irvine Welsh; and former Archbishop of Canterbury Rowan Williams. Nick Cave's Veiled World was produced by Supercollider, a Zinc Media company. Mike Christie served as director and Seb Barfield as producer. Sky credited Barbara Lee as commissioning editor and Charlotte Mardon-Heath as executive producer for Sky Studios. In The Independent, Roisin O'Connor wrote that the film focuses on Cave's songwriting process and is divided into chapters. In The Guardian, Lucy Mangan described it as an unconventional documentary that avoids a standard retrospective format and explores Cave's transformation in the context of grief and faith.

== Awards and nominations ==
- Nominated for the Royal Television Society Programme Awards (Arts) (2026).
