= Parkour =

Athletic training discipline

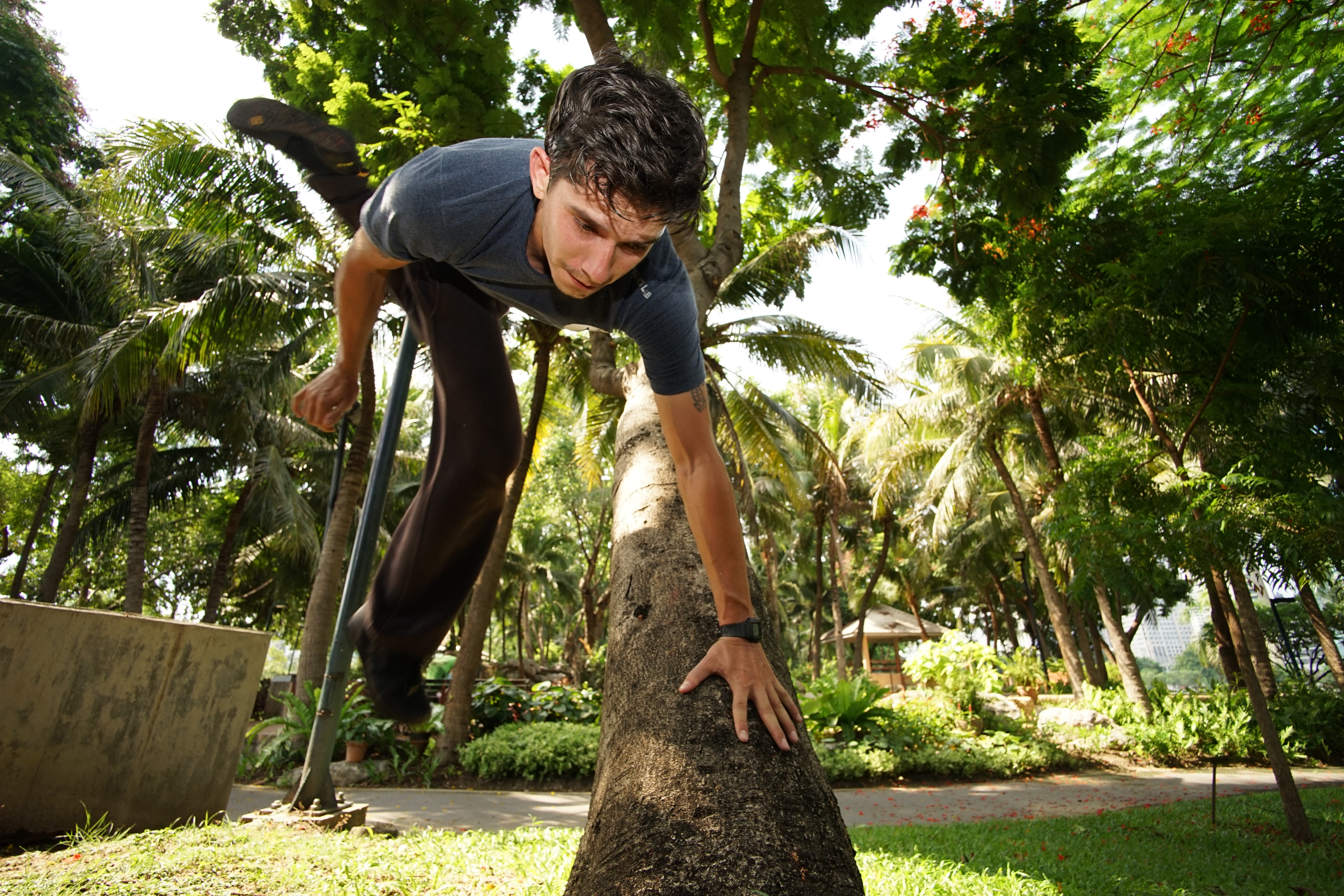
- An athlete performing parkour
- Also known as: PK
- Focus: Environment interaction
- Country of origin: France
- Date of formation: 1995–1996
- Ancestor arts: African Acrobatics; Asian martial arts; athletics, gymnastics; obstacle courses
- Olympic sport: Not currently; IOC discussions underway Part of World Games

Parkour (PK; French: [paʁkuʁ]) is a self-led movement practice where practitioners use only the abilities of their bodies to interact with obstacles in any given environment. With roots in military obstacle course training and martial arts, parkour includes flipping, running, climbing, swinging, vaulting, jumping, plyometrics, rolling, and whatever is suitable for a given situation. Parkour is an activity that can be practiced alone or with others, and is usually carried out in urban spaces, though it can be done anywhere. It involves seeing one's environment in a new way, and envisioning the potential for navigating it by movement around, across, through, over and under its features.

Historically, flips and other acrobatic movements were not considered essential to the discipline of parkour, and the term freerunning was applied to parkour-like movement that emphasized artistry rather than efficiency. However, as the parkour culture evolved, its distinction from freerunning became increasingly blurred. Parkour athletes now broadly agree that flips are unambiguously part of parkour.

The practice of similar movements had existed in communities around the world for centuries, notably in Africa and China, the latter tradition (qinggong) popularized by Hong Kong action cinema (notably Jackie Chan) during the 1970s to 1980s. The label of Parkour in reference to this kind of movement was established by David Belle when he and others founded the Yamakasi in the 1990s. The discipline was popularised in the 1990s and 2000s through films, documentaries, video games, and advertisements.

Competitive parkour began to grow in popularity during the mid-2000s, and today, several disjoint organizations produce competitions under the title of Parkour World Championships.

== Etymology ==
The word parkour derives from parcours du combattant (obstacle course), the classic obstacle course method of military training proposed by Georges Hébert. Raymond Belle used the term "les parcours" to encompass all of his training including climbing, jumping, running, balancing, and the other methods he undertook in his personal athletic advancement. His son, David, further developed his father's methods and achieved success as a stuntman, and one day on a film set showed his 'Speed Air Man' video to Hubert Koundé. Koundé suggested he change the "c" of "parcours" to a "k" because it was stronger and more dynamic, and to remove the silent "s" for the same reason, forming "parkour".

A practitioner of parkour is called a "Parkour Athlete" or simply a "Parkourist." Historically, practitioners of parkour were called traceurs, with the feminine form being traceuse. These terms were nouns derived from the French verb tracer, which normally means "to trace", as in "tracing a path", in reference to drawing. The verb tracer used familiarly means: "to hurry up". The term traceur was originally the name of a parkour group headed by David Belle which included Sébastien Foucan and Stéphane Vigroux.

A jam refers to a meeting of traceurs, involving training lasting anywhere from hours to several days, often with people from different cities. The first parkour jam was organised in July 2002 by Romain Drouet, with a dozen people including Sébastien Foucan and Stéphane Vigroux.

== History ==
=== Origins ===
The practice of similar movements existed in various communities around the world for centuries prior to the foundation of a parkour movement, which was influenced by these earlier traditions. Such athletic traditions had existed among various indigenous peoples in Africa for centuries. A similar discipline in Chinese culture is qinggong, a Chinese martial arts training technique that also dates back centuries. It was notably taught at the Peking Opera School in the 20th century; the school's most notable students are the Seven Little Fortunes, including Sammo Hung and most famously Jackie Chan, providing a basis for their acrobatic stunt work in Hong Kong action cinema from the 1970s onwards.

=== Georges Hébert ===
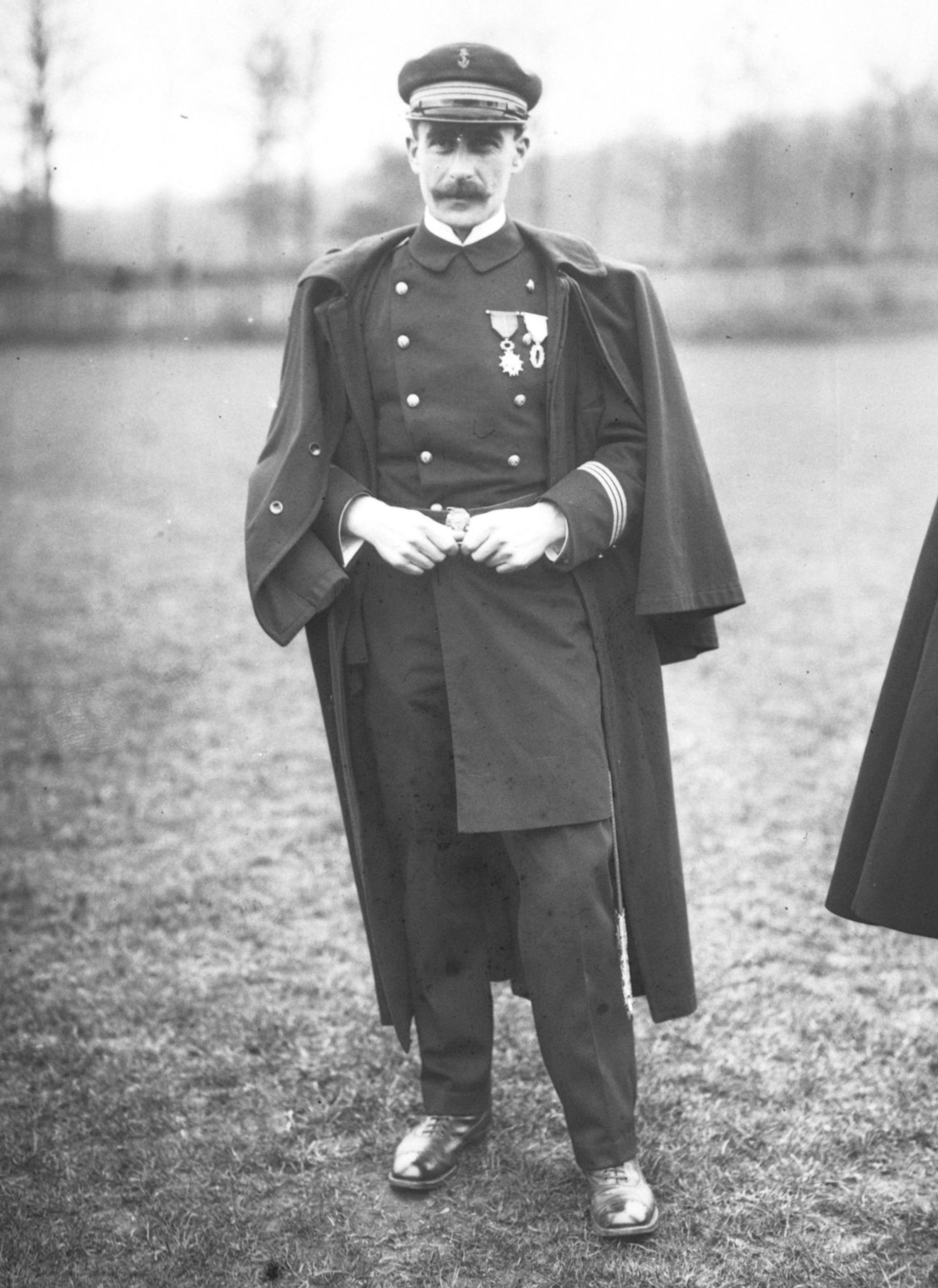
Georges Hébert (1875–1957)

In Western Europe, a forerunner of parkour was developed by French naval officer Georges Hébert, who before World War I promoted athletic skill based on the models of indigenous tribes he had met in Africa. He noted, "their bodies were splendid, flexible, nimble, skillful, enduring, and resistant but yet they had no other tutor in gymnastics but their lives in nature." His rescue efforts during the 1902 eruption of Mount Pelée on Saint-Pierre, Martinique reinforced his belief that athletic skill must be combined with courage and altruism. Hébert became a physical education tutor at the college of Reims in France. Hébert set up a "méthode naturelle" (natural method) session consisting of ten fundamental groups: walking, running, jumping, quadrupedal movement, climbing, balancing, throwing, lifting, self-defence, and swimming. These were intended to develop "the three main forces": energetic (willpower, courage, coolness, and firmness), moral (benevolence, assistance, honour, and honesty), and physical (muscles and breath). During World War I and World War II, teaching continued to expand, becoming the standard system of French military education and training. Inspired by Hébert, a Swiss architect developed a "parcours du combattant"—military obstacle course—the first of the courses that are now standard in military training and which led to the development of civilian fitness trails and confidence courses.

=== John Ciampa ===
Born in 1922 in the US, John Ciampa was an acrobatic stuntman and entertainer known by the stage names of the Human Fly, the Flying Phantom and the Brooklyn Tarzan whose acrobatic buildering and freestyle tree climbing bear striking resemblance to late 20th Century parkour. Those feats were featured in two 1942 Paramount Pictures newsreels coincident with the release of the feature film Tarzan's New York Adventure.

=== Raymond and David Belle ===
Born in 1939 in Vietnam, Raymond Belle was the son of a French physician and Vietnamese mother. During the First Indochina War, his father died and he was separated from his mother, after which he was sent to a military orphanage in Da Lat at the age of seven. He took it upon himself to train harder and longer than everyone else in order never to be a victim. At night, when everyone else was asleep, he would be outside running or climbing trees. He would use the military obstacle courses in secret, and also created courses of his own that tested his endurance, strength, and flexibility. Doing this enabled him not only to survive the hardships he experienced during his childhood, but also eventually to thrive. After the Battle of Dien Bien Phu in 1954, he returned to France and remained in military education until the age of 19, when he joined the Paris Fire Brigade, a French Army unit.

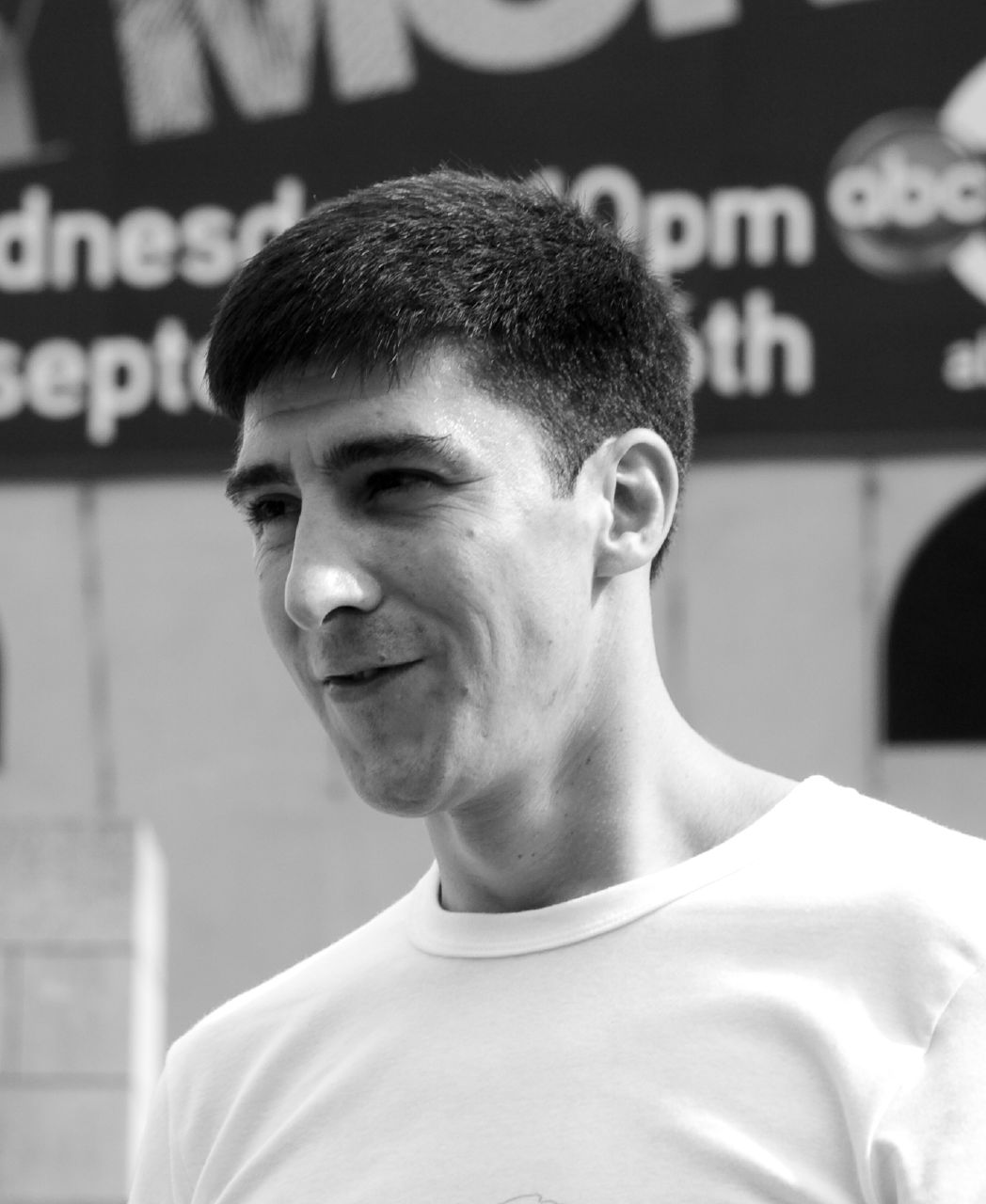
David Belle is considered the founder of parkour.

Raymond's son, David Belle, was born in 1973. He experimented with gymnastics and athletics but became increasingly disaffected with both school and the sports clubs. As he got older, he learned of his father's exploits and was increasingly curious about what had enabled his father to accomplish these feats. Through conversations with his father, he realised that what he really wanted was a means to develop skills that would be useful to him in life, rather than just training to kick a ball or perform moves in a padded, indoor environment.

Through conversations with his father, David learned about this way of training that his father called "parcours". He heard his father talk of the many repetitions he had done in order to find the best way of doing things. He learned that for his father, training was not a game but something vital which enabled him to survive and to protect the people he cared about. David realised that this was what he had been searching for, and so he began training in the same way. After a time, he found it far more important to him than schooling and he gave up his other commitments to focus all his time on his training.

=== Yamakasi ===
David initially trained on his own, and after moving to Lisses, found other young men (including his cousins) who had similar desires, and they began to train together. The group eventually included David Belle, Sébastien Foucan, Châu Belle Dinh, Williams Belle, Yann Hnautra, Laurent Piemontesi, Guylain N'Guba Boyeke, Malik Diouf, and Charles Perrière. The group began calling themselves the Yamakasi, from the Lingala ya makási, meaning strong in one's person, or "strong man, strong spirit" (see § Name and split below).

The group drew inspiration from Asian culture and Asian martial arts, notably the acrobatics of Jackie Chan such as qinggong displays in his Hong Kong action films, and the training philosophy of Bruce Lee, considering the latter to be the "unofficial president" of their group. The group also was influenced by the martial arts films of Belgian actor Jean-Claude Van Damme.

==== Discipline ====
The group put themselves through challenges that forced them to find the physical and mental strength to succeed. Examples included training without food or water, or sleeping on the floor without a blanket to learn to endure the cold. For example, no one in the group was permitted to be late for training, as it would hold back the whole group. If any member completed a challenge, everyone else had to do the same thing. During their training, no one was allowed to complain or be negative. Few excuses were allowed. For instance, if someone claimed that his shoes were too worn out in to make a jump, he had to do it anyway, even if it meant doing the jump barefoot. At the same time, everyone was required to have knowledge of their own limits.

Respecting one's health and physical well-being was one of the foundations of the group. If any member hurt himself during or after the execution of a movement, the movement was deemed a failure. A movement executed only once was not considered an achievement; only with repetition was the challenge complete. Every movement had to be repeated at least ten times in a row without the traceur having to push his limits or sustaining any injury. If any mistake was made by any traceur in the group everyone had to start all over again.

Humility was an important principle. No traceur was allowed to feel superior to someone else, for example, by executing a movement only to show off in front of someone who could not perform the movement. If any traceur in the group claimed that he had completed a difficult and dangerous challenge that should not be attempted unaided, he had to prove his claims by doing the challenge again. Anyone who lied violated the principle of humility.

To join the group, new members had to be recommended by an existing member and then pass tests to evaluate their motivation for joining. Despite the huge emphasis on the collective, each traceur had to progress and develop independently—"to create the means to be yourself"—and there was a complete trust within the group. Every traceur was to encourage the others and show confidence through their behaviour. If a member violated the principles, the group could meet without the offending person to discuss various punishments. Anyone deemed unsuitable could be temporarily or even permanently banned from the group in order to uphold its disciplines and values.

==== Name and split ====
In 1997, David Belle's brother Jean-François invited the group to perform for the public in a firefighter show in Paris. For the performance, the group named themselves Yamakasi, from the Congolese Lingala ya makási, meaning strong in one's person, or "strong man, strong spirit". Sébastien Foucan also invented a name for what they were doing: "l'art du déplacement" (French for "the art of movement"). The firefighter performance caused both positive and negative attention. Some members of the group were concerned how the public would view their discipline since the performance did not demonstrate all aspects of it, such as their hard training and their values and ethics. Jean-François also sent pictures and video of the group to a French TV programme, and the popularity of parkour began to increase. A series of television programmes in various countries subsequently featured video footage of the group, and they began to get more requests for performances. During this time, conflicting interests arose within the group. Sébastien Foucan wanted to teach more rather than to train more, and David Belle had the ambition to become an actor. David and Sébastien chose to leave the group, and used the name "parkour" to describe their activity (see § Etymology above). The seven remaining Yamakasi members continued to use the term l'art du déplacement (see § Derivative terminologies and disciplines below).

== Organizations ==
International parkour organisations include the World Freerunning and Parkour Federation (WFPF), established in 2008, who have worked with MTV to produce parkour-related shows. Other notable parkour governing bodies include International Parkour Federation (IPF), and Parkour Earth (PKE).

== Competitive parkour ==
Parkour, as a competitive sport, started in the mid-2000s. Sport parkour is governed by various international governing bodies, including the International Parkour Federation (IPF), the World Freerunning Parkour Federation (WFPF), and Parkour Earth (PKE), as well as numerous national governing bodies, such as the United States Parkour Association (USPK). Notable tournaments include World Parkour Championship (WPC), Red Bull Art of Motion, Sport Parkour League (SPL) World Championships, and FIG World Parkour Championship.

World Freerunning and Parkour Federation (WFPF) was formed in 2008, being the first organization with the goal of creating a competitive format for Parkour. A rival governing body, the International Parkour Federation (IPF), was established in 2014.

Parkour appeared in the 2016 Winter Youth Olympics as a demonstration sport ran by International Gymnastics Federation (FIG). FIG has attempted to develop parkour as a new discipline for gymnastics, organised their own run tournaments, and to add parkour to the Olympics as neither an independent sport nor run by established parkour governing bodies. Most of the parkour community reacted negatively, seeing FIG as appropriating and capitalising on the sport, and that part of the culture of parkour would be lost. The hashtag #wearenotgymmastics became a popular hashtag used by parkour athletes. Several national governing bodies came together to create Parkour Earth (PKE) in 2017 to oppose FIG. Parkour Earth representing various national governing bodies wrote an open letter to ask the International Olympic Committee to reject any submission by the FIG to include Parkour on the Olympic programme.

In 2020 IPF and World Obstacle signed a memorandum of understanding to form a unified international federation governing obstacle sports, disciplines and events to have a single, collaborative governance framework to further the development and growth of obstacle sports worldwide. On March 6th 2023 The United States Parkour Association (USPK) and Sport Parkour League (SPL) formed a partnership focused on cooperating in creating and formalizing rules and regulations for the US national competitive parkour league, a circuit of 40+ competitions across the United States. On 22 December 2026 Parkour Earth (PKE) and Sport Parkour League (SPL) have signed a Memorandum of Understanding, not merging systems or creating joint events but to create official dialogue, calendar coordination, and potential aligned qualification pathways while having open system for athletes and organizers.

Parkour has adjacent related sports such as World Chase Tag, World Ninja League, Obstacle course racing, and Adventure racing.

== Sport parkour disciplines ==
Competitive sport parkour is divided into 3 major disciplines: speed, skill, and style, each with its own sub-events. The specific rules vary between governing bodies and tournaments. The layout of obstacles and structures used in competitions varies by tournament.

=== Speed ===
Speed discipline has parkour athletes going from point A to point B as fast as possible through an obstacle course.

=== Skill ===
Skill discipline has parkour athletes perform a series of predefined, difficult, highly technical movements or set challenges that have to be completed in a set sequence in a limited amount of time or attempts.

=== Style ===
Style discipline focuses on parkour athletes performing high-difficulty moves, such as complex flips, vaults, and transitions during a limited time and then given points by judges based on criteria sometimes including, but not always limited to Flow, Creativity, Difficulty, Execution, and Environment Interaction. Style tournament formats vary, and can use a single style event or a combination of style events combining scores together to determine a winner.

- "Lines" style event has parkour athletes judged on performance on a seamless continuous, linked sequence of movements showcasing a diverse array of techniques and showcasing creativity in the utilization of various obstacles within the area, with an allotted time generally between 10 and 30 seconds in length.
- "Combos" style event has parkour athletes judged on performance of a compact seamless connected sequence of multiple moves (generally 2 to 5) performed in quick succession without any breaks or interruptions.
- "Best trick" style event has parkour athletes perform a single, high-difficult movement or trick

== Philosophy ==
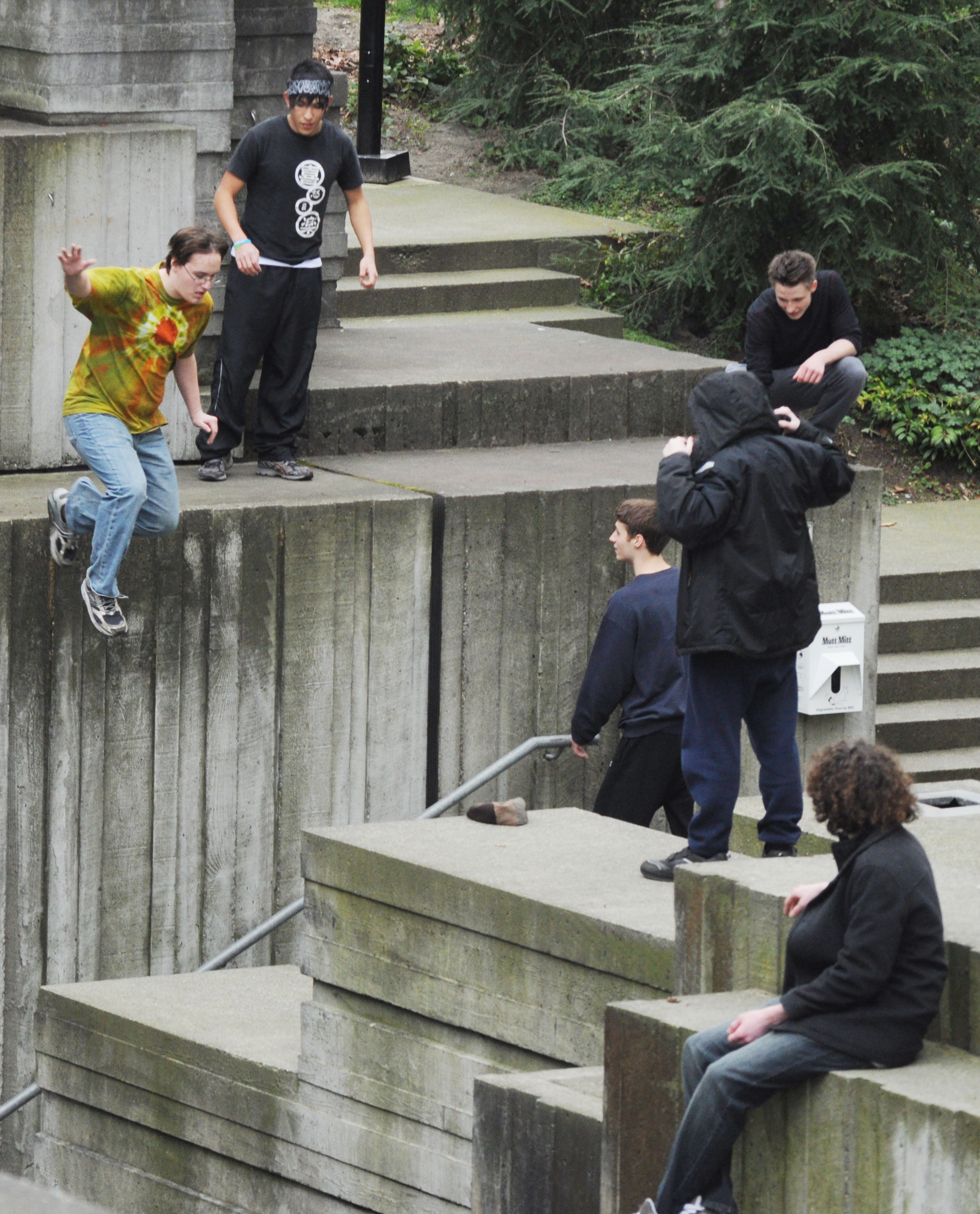
A beginner takes a leap in Seattle's Freeway Park under the guidance of experienced practitioners (2012).

According to Williams Belle, the philosophies and theories behind parkour are an integral aspect of the art, one that many non-practitioners have never been exposed to. Belle says he trains people because he wants it "to be alive" and "for people to use it". Châu Belle explains it is a "type of freedom" or "kind of expression"; that parkour is "only a state of mind" rather than a set of actions, and that it is about overcoming and adapting to mental and emotional obstacles as well as physical barriers. Traceur Dylan Baker says, "Parkour also influences one's thought processes by enhancing self-confidence and critical thinking skills that allow one to overcome everyday physical and mental obstacles". A study by Neuropsychiatrie de l'Enfance et de l'Adolescence (Neuropsychiatry of Childhood and Adolescence) in France found traceurs seek more excitement and leadership situations than gymnasts do.

Academic research on parkour has tended to describe how parkour provides a novel way of interacting with the urban environment that challenges the use and meaning of urban space, metropolitan life, and embodiment.

A newer convention of parkour philosophy has been the idea of "human reclamation". Andy Tran of Urban Evolution clarifies it as "a means of reclaiming what it means to be a human being. It teaches us to move using the natural methods that we should have learned from infancy. It teaches us to touch the world and interact with it, instead of being sheltered by it." Another traceur writes, "It is as much as a part of truly learning the physical art as well as being able to master the movements; it gives you the ability to overcome your fears and pains and reapply this to life, as you must be able to control your mind in order to master the art of parkour."

=== Competition ===
A campaign was started on 1 May 2007 by the Parkour.NET portal to preserve parkour's philosophy against sports competition and rivalry. In the words of Erwan Le Corre, "Competition pushes people to fight against others for the satisfaction of a crowd and/or the benefits of a few business people by changing its mindset. Parkour is unique and cannot be a competitive sport unless it ignores its altruistic core of self-development. If parkour becomes a sport, it will be hard to seriously teach and spread parkour as a non-competitive activity. And a new sport will be spread that may be called parkour, but that won't hold its philosophical essence anymore." Red Bull's sponsored athlete for parkour, Ryan Doyle, has said, "Sometimes people ask, 'Who is the best at parkour?' and it is because they don't understand what Parkour is; 'Who is the best?' is what you would say about a sport, and parkour is not a sport—it is an art, it's a discipline. That's like saying, 'What's the best song in the world?'" This seems to be the consensus among many professional traceurs who view parkour as a lifestyle more than as a set of tricks, as has been popularised by YouTube and most media exposure.

There are competitions that use parkour as the main influence for formatting and judging criteria. Sport Parkour League's "North America Parkour Championships" hosts a series of local and regional qualifier events which culminate in a final event in Vancouver, B.C. Red Bull's Art of Motion event is the longest running and highest profile professional freerunning competition.

=== David Belle ===
In his 2009 book Parkour, David Belle stressed that the most important aspect of parkour is not the physical movements, but rather the practitioner's mentality and understanding of its principles. "When young trainees come to see me and give me videos telling me to check out what they are doing, I just take the tape and throw it away. What I'm interested in is what the guy's got in his head, if he has self-confidence, if he masters the technique, if he has understood the principles of parkour. I just can't deal with guys who do Parkour because they saw videos on the Internet and thought it was kinda cool and want to do even better." Further, he states the importance of traceurs being aware of their abilities and limitations, and developing in their own way. "When a young person asks me, 'Can you show me how to do this?' I simply answer, ‘No, I am going to show you how I do it. Then, you'll have to learn with your own technique, your own way of moving, your style, your abilities and your limitations. You are going to learn to be yourself, not someone else along the way.’"

The philosophy of parkour has been compared to that of martial arts. In an interview with The New Yorker, Ryan Ford, an early American adopter of parkour, acknowledges the influence of martial arts: "There's a quote by Bruce Lee that's my motto: 'There are no limits. There are plateaus, but you must not stay there, you must go beyond them. A man must constantly exceed his level.' If you're not better than you were the day before, then what are you doing—what's the point?" In an interview with the press, Belle explained that parkour is a training method for warriors. "So many people try to train easy—'Come do parkour! It's really cool!' But if tomorrow I made you do real training, you would end up crying. That's what you need to know: you are going to cry, you are going to bleed and you are going to sweat like never before." In his book, Belle also quotes his father Raymond, "If two roads open up before you, always take the most difficult one. Because you know you can travel the easy one."

Belle is an influential proponent of discipline and control in parkour, saying, "Precision is all about being measured," and going on to describe parkour as an art that requires huge amounts of repetition and practice to master. "With parkour, I often say, 'Once is never'. In other words, someone can manage a jump one time but it does not mean anything. It can be luck or chance. When you make a jump, you have to do it at least three times to be sure you can actually do it. It's an unavoidable rule. Do it the hard way and stop lying to yourself. When you come for training, you have to train. Even if it means doing the same jump fifty or a hundred times." To its founder, parkour is a method of self-refinement, used for learning to control and focus oneself.

== Practice ==
=== Movement ===
A practitioner performing a wall run

While there is no official list of "moves" in parkour, the style in which practitioners move often sets them apart from others, and there are a number of named movements that are characteristic, for example:

- "Parkour roll": Rolling to absorb impacts from larger drops, moving diagonally over a shoulder to convert momentum from vertical to horizontal.
- "Precision jump": Jumping and landing accurately with the feet on small or narrow obstacles.
- "Arm jump": Jumping and landing feet-first on a vertical surface, catching the horizontal top with the hands.
- "Wall run": Running toward a high wall and then jumping and pushing off the wall with a foot to reach the top of the wall.
- "Climb up": Moving from a position hanging from a wall-top or ledge, to standing on the top or vaulting over to the other side.

=== Equipment ===
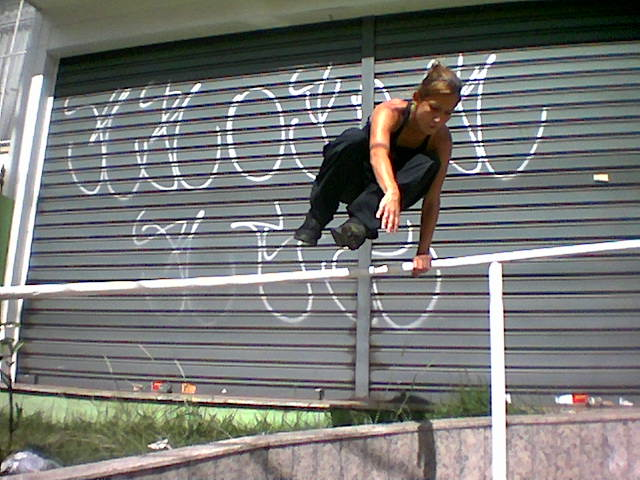
A traceuse vaults a railing.

Parkour is practiced without traditional equipment, though items such as bars, walls, and boxes found in the environment in which the parkour is being practiced in, are utilised to better navigate the area. Practitioners normally train wearing light, non-restrictive casual clothing. Traceurs who wear gloves are rare—bare hands are considered better for grip and tactile feedback. Light running shoes with good grip and flexibility are encouraged because they allow for more natural and fluid movements. Practitioners often use minimalist shoes, sometimes as a progression to bare feet, for better sensitivity and balance, while others prefer more cushioning for better absorption of impacts from large jumps. Barefoot training is done by some for movement competency without gear—David Belle noted that "bare feet are the best shoes." Various sneaker manufacturers have developed shoes specifically for parkour and freerunning. Many other companies around the world have started offering clothing targeted at parkour.

=== Risks ===
==== Trespassing ====
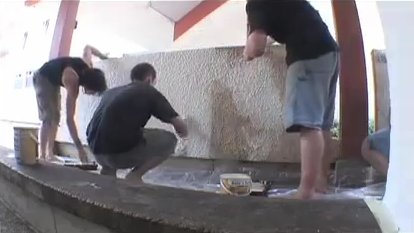
Traceurs in Lisses re-painting a wall and repairing shoe scuff marks from parkour

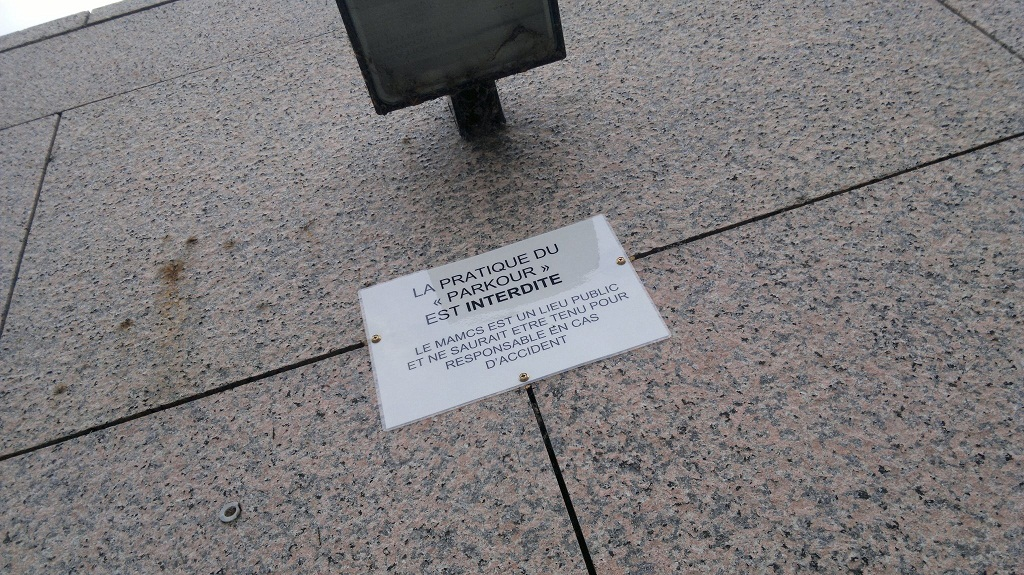
A notice on a wall of the Strasbourg Museum of Modern and Contemporary Art in 2012 prohibiting parkour (removed in 2018)

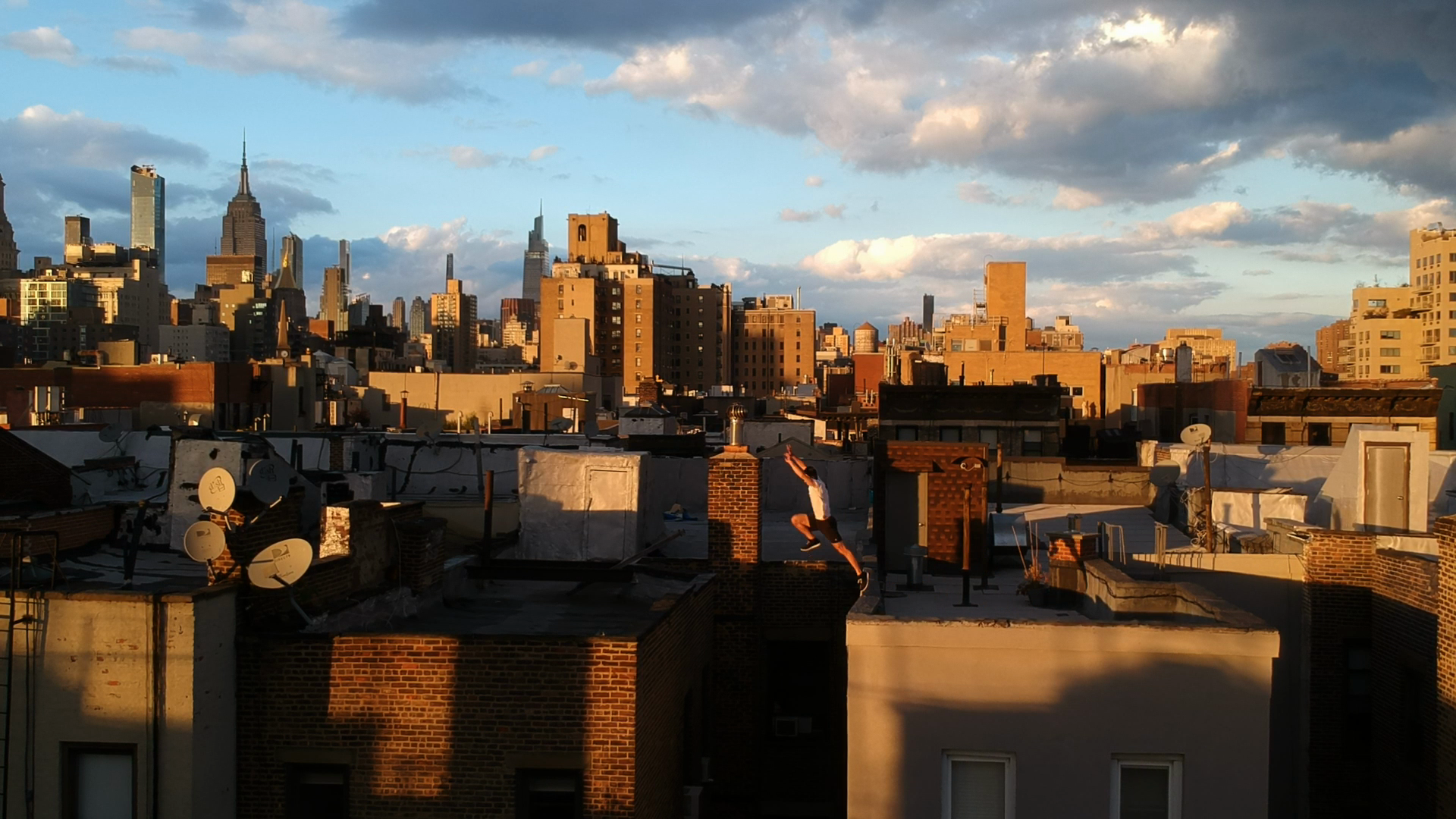
A photo of a parkour practitioner jumping over a roof gap in New York City.

Parkour is not widely practiced in dedicated public facilities. Although efforts are being made to create places for it, many traceurs do not like the idea, as it is contradictory to parkour's values of adaptation, creativity, and freedom. Traceurs practice parkour in both rural and urban areas such as gyms, parks, playgrounds, offices, and abandoned structures. Concerns have been raised regarding trespassing, damage of property, and use of inappropriate places such as cemeteries. Many parkour organizations around the globe support the Leave No Trace initiative, an urban version of the outdoor conservation ethic created by the Seattle nonprofit Parkour Visions in 2008, promoting safety, respect for the spaces used and their other users, and sometimes includes picking up rubbish to leave areas in better condition than they were found.

==== Injuries and deaths ====
Concerns have been raised by law enforcement and fire and rescue teams about the risks inherent in jumping off high buildings. They argue that practitioners are needlessly risking damage to both themselves and rooftops by practicing at height, with police forces calling for practitioners to stay off the rooftops. Some practitioners of parkour agree that such behaviour should be discouraged.

Because parkour philosophy is about learning to control oneself in interaction with the environment, many parkour experts consider serious injury evidence of the traceur's failure to follow the precepts of the discipline, specifically, knowing one's limitations. Daniel Ilabaca, co-founder of the World Parkour and Freerunning Federation, said, "Thinking you're going to fail at something gives you a higher risk of doing just that. Committing to something you're thinking or knowing you will land gives you a higher chance of landing or completing the task." On biomechanical grounds, studies found parkour landing techniques result in lower landing forces in comparison with traditional sport techniques. In a survey of parkour-related emergency department visits in the United States between 2009 and 2015, most injuries were reportedly caused by landing or from striking objects.

American traceur Mark Toorock said injuries are rare "because participants rely not on what they can't control—wheels or the icy surfaces of snowboarding and skiing—but their own hands and feet." Lanier Johnson, executive director of the American Sports Medicine Institute, said that many of the injuries are not reported.

In 2013, a person in Russia attempted a backflip on the ledge of a roof of a 16-story building, but when attempting to land on the ledge, fell from the building and died. On 16 August 2019, it was reported that another person in Russia was "engaged in parkour on the roof" of a 9-story building and during a jump, fell off the roof and died from the fall.

== Impact ==
Initially featured in films of French director/producer Luc Besson, parkour was first introduced to the British public by the BBC One TV channel trailer Rush Hour in April 2002. It featured David Belle leaping across London's rooftops from his office to home, in an attempt to catch his favourite BBC programme, and captured the imagination of many viewers, especially when they learned no special effects or wires were used. This advertisement, along with others for Coca-Cola, Nike, and Toyota, had a large-scale impact on public awareness of parkour.

The creation of parkour show-reels and documentaries has been crucial to the spread of parkour, and is common in the parkour community. Jump London is a 2003 documentary explaining some of the background of parkour, culminating with Sébastien Foucan, Johann Vigroux, and Jérôme Ben Aoues demonstrating their parkour skills. Jump London changed the presence of parkour in the UK almost overnight and is widely credited for inspiring a new generation of traceurs. It was followed by Jump Britain in 2005. Both Jump films were shown in more than 80 countries, thereby introducing the discipline and its philosophy to an unprecedented global audience. Both films have been cited by numerous practitioners as their motivation for taking up the discipline.

The Australian version of 60 Minutes broadcast a segment about parkour on 16 September 2007, featuring Foucan and Stephane Vigroux.

Parkour is not defined by a set of rules or guidelines, a feature which has proven particularly attractive to young people, allowing them to explore and engage in the activity on their own terms. It can be easily accepted by all cultures as a means of personal expression and recreation. For example, in 2010 The New York Times published a short video featuring three young men from the Gaza Strip who were active members of the parkour community. In 2014, the BBC covered youth parkour participation in Jammu and Kashmir. Zahid Shah founded the Kashmir Freerunning and Parkour Federation, finding hope in the non-violent discipline of parkour.

=== Entertainment ===
Parkour has become a popular element in action sequences, with film directors hiring parkour practitioners as stunt performers. The first director to do so was Luc Besson, for the film Taxi 2 in 1998, followed by Yamakasi in 2001 featuring members of the original Yamakasi group, and its sequel Les fils du vent in 2004. Also in 2004, Besson wrote District 13, another feature film involving advanced parkour chase sequences, starring David Belle and Cyril Raffaelli, followed by the sequel District 13: Ultimatum in 2009 and remade in English as Brick Mansions in 2014.

In 2006, the James Bond film Casino Royale featured Sébastien Foucan in a chase taking place early in the movie, sparking renewed media interest in parkour. Along with The Bourne Ultimatum (2007), Casino Royale is credited with starting a new wave of Parkour-inspired stunts in Western film and television. Parkour was prominent in Live Free or Die Hard (2007), again with stuntman/actor Cyril Raffaelli, and Prince of Persia: The Sands of Time (2010), choreographed by David Belle. Several films besides Yamakasi are about thieves who use parkour, such as Breaking and Entering (2006), Run (2013), and Tracers (2015). The 2011 film Freerunner is about eight freerunners racing through a city for survival. The 2019 Netflix film 6 Underground featured several parkour scenes choreographed and performed by team Storror. Parkour also featured in Dhoom 3 (2013), Bang Bang! (2014), and Aadhi (2018).

Parkour is also featured on TV. MTV's show Ultimate Parkour Challenge premiered as a one-hour special in October 2009, starring the athletes of the World Freerunning & Parkour Federation. This was followed in May 2010 by a six-episode series of the same name. The athletes were Daniel Ilabaca, Tim Shieff, Ryan Doyle, Michael Turner, Oleg Vorslav, Ben Jenkin, Daniel Arroyo, Pip Andersen and King David. The programme format was a two-part weekly competition in different Southern California locations.

Professional wrestler John Hennigan is a long-time practitioner of parkour and often incorporates it into his wrestling style, with the WWE giving him the nickname "The Prince of Parkour". Actor Stephen Amell learned parkour at Tempest Academy in preparation for his role as Oliver Queen in the television series Arrow, and co-star Caity Lotz is also a practitioner.

Modern video games frequently include aspects of parkour as major gameplay elements. Since its inception, the Tomb Raider series has included increasingly numerous parkour elements. The Assassin's Creed series also makes heavy use of parkour movement (called freerunning in the games). The Mirror's Edge games are heavily inspired by parkour, consisting entirely of efficiently moving around buildings, rooftops, and other obstacles. Brink introduced a parkour mechanic into a realistic first-person shooter. Prince of Persia and Dying Light include a central parkour mechanic, while Crackdown and Crackdown 2 include an emphasis on gripping and vaulting from ledges and protruding objects. Tony Hawk's American Wasteland allows the player character to use several freerunning techniques while not on the skateboard. Tron Evolution's basic movements and combat were based on parkour and capoeira.

=== Military training ===
Although parkour itself grew out of military obstacle-course training, it has become a separate discipline. After the attention that parkour received following the 2006 film Casino Royale, military forces around the world began looking for ways to incorporate elements from parkour into military training. A physical trainer with the Royal Marines trained with parkour practitioners with hopes of introducing some of their techniques to his own students. Colorado Parkour began a project to introduce elements from parkour into the U.S. military and one San Diego staff sergeant trained US Marines in parkour.

=== Scientific research and applications ===
Studies have found that in exercises such as the standing long jump, depth jump, and vertical jump, parkour athletes outperform physical educators, gymnasts, and power athletes. Parkour training is especially linked with the development of eccentric load resistance and jumping ability.

A study into the mechanics of the standing long jump showed that experienced traceurs use a lower take off angle than beginners (~25.6° vs ~34°). Wakai and Linthorne had previously estimated the optimal angle to be close to 22.6°.

Studies and experiments have integrated parkour kinaesthetics into robotics.

== Freerunning ==
Freerunning is an athletic and acrobatic discipline incorporating an aesthetic element, and can be considered either a sport or a performance art, or both. Freerunning is similar to parkour, from which it is derived, but emphasizes artistry over efficiency and speed. It involves interacting with physical obstacles in creative ways, such as by climbing, jumping or running; the obstacles may be purpose-built or may be part of a pre-existing natural or man-made environment. The movements are usually adopted from other sports, such as gymnastics, tricking or breakdancing. Freerunners can create their own moves, flows and lines in different landscapes. Both parkour and freerunning encompass the ideas of overcoming obstacles and self-expression; in freerunning, the greater emphasis is on self-expression.

The central principle of freerunning is that one should express oneself by moving fluidly in one's environment; there are no limitations on the form of this movement. Foucan expands on a number of basic principles of the sport in his book, Freerunning. Other practitioners have suggested other principles. For example, Daniel Ilabaca encourages people to think positively, suggesting that practitioners of freerunning will sometimes fall—largely because they think they might.

The word "freerunning" was first used in Mike Christie's documentary Jump London, starring Sébastien Foucan, released in September 2003. In the documentary, the term "freerunning" was used as an attempt to translate "parkour", in order to make it more appealing to the English-speaking audience. Foucan decided to keep using the term "freerunning" to describe his discipline, to distinguish it from David Belle's methods. The remaining seven Yamakasi members continued to use the term "l'art du déplacement", also not wanting to associate it too closely with parkour. Similar to Sébastien's freerunning, l'art du déplacement is less about the hard discipline of the original Yamakasi group; rather, it takes a participatory approach focused on making the teaching more accessible. David Belle kept the term "parkour", saying the group contributed to the development of it, but that his father was the source of his motivation and had verbally communicated this method only to him.

Foucan wanted to create a discipline that was more personal to the individual than parkour and more easily adapted to suit each person's individual goals. His idea was similar to that of Bruce Lee's creation of Jeet Kune Do. Foucan wanted to take everything that he had found useful and that he liked from his parkour experiences and combine it into one sport. Foucan's early ideas were first spread through the Jump London documentary (2003) and its sequel, Jump Britain (2005). Foucan has appeared in other productions, such as Casino Royale and Madonna's Confessions Tour. With each appearance both the discipline and Foucan himself increased in fame.

== See also ==
- Acrobatics
- Buildering
- Calisthenics
- Dérive – a philosophy and technique of rapid, serendipitous movement through mostly urban environments
- Freerunning
- List of sports
- Obstacle racing
- Platform game
- Qinggong – Chinese martial arts techniques
- Rooftopping
- Street workout
- Tricking (martial arts)
- Urban exploration
- Woggle hopping
- World Chase Tag

== General and cited sources ==
- Angel, Julie (2011). Ciné Parkour. Julie Angel. ISBN 978-0-9569717-1-5.
- Belle, David & Perriére, Charles. Parkour: From the Origins to the Practise.
- Belle, David (2009). Parkour. Intervista. ISBN 978-2-35756-025-3.
