= Jump London =

British Documentary

Jump London is a documentary first broadcast by Channel 4 about parkour and free running in September 2003, directed by Mike Christie and produced by Optomen Television. It later spawned a sequel, Jump Britain that first aired in January 2005. Both feature documentaries were directed by Mike Christie.

Jump London followed three French traceurs, Sébastien Foucan, Jérôme Ben Aoues, and Johann Vigroux, as they run around many of London's most famous landmarks, including Royal Albert Hall, Shakespeare's Globe Theatre, HMS Belfast, and many others.

Foucan subsequently appeared in Madonna's music video for "Jump" and choreographed and performed in her 2006 Confessions Tour.

A 2025 study in the International Review for the Sociology of Sport traced the establishment of parkour in Gaza to 2005, when a local team founder discovered the discipline by watching Jump London on Al Jazeera.

== Music ==
The music used in the film for each location was as follows:

- "Ordinary Day" by Bent (from The Everlasting Blink) - Somerset House
- "Jump Main Theme" by Ian Masterson - The Mall, Royal Albert Hall
- "Jumping" by Ian Masterson - HMS Belfast, Redjacket
- "Noctuary" by Bonobo (from Dial 'M' for Monkey) - City of London School, Globe
- "London" by Pet Shop Boys / Felix da Housecat (from Disco 3) - Globe, Big Ben shots
- "Break My Head" by Thomas Beach - Old County Hall, Saatchi & Saatchi, Soho
- "What Your Soul Sings" by Massive Attack (from 100th Window) - National Theatre, Tate Modern
