= Ryan Doyle =

English freerunner (born 1984)

Personal information
- Nationality: British
- Born: 22 September 1984 (age 41)
- Height: 1.73 m (5 ft 8 in)
- Website: www.ryandoyle.co.uk

Sport
- Sport: Freerunning

Achievements and titles
- World finals: Red Bull Art of Motion, Vienna 2007 – Winner; Red Bull Art of Motion, São Paulo 2011 – Winner

Ryan Doyle (born 22 September 1984) is a freerunner, martial artist, coach, and actor from Liverpool, England, and is a founding athlete of the World Freerunning and Parkour Federation.

== Freerunning and parkour interests ==
In his teenage years, Doyle trained in the Korean martial art of Kuk Sool Won, and developed his running style by adding his own freerunning movements to the martial arts techniques he had learned. Doyle began his freerunner career by winning the 2007 Art of Motion competition in Vienna. He broke his leg in the competition while attempting a trick from a 12-foot jump during the finals. This left Doyle with a plate on his fibula and a 33 cm bar with 14 screws down the core of his shin bone. Despite this setback, Doyle made a full recovery.

Even though he suffers from poor eyesight, Doyle is a two-time winner of the Red Bull Art of Motion competition. He is now officially sponsored by Red Bull energy drink.

In 2011 Doyle won the Art of Motion competition again. He received eighth place in the Red Bull Art of Motion 2012 (staged in Santorini, Greece), following a tour applying urban acrobatic techniques at the sites of the seven wonders of the world. In 2022 Doyle.

== Media attention ==
Doyle was a cast member of MTV's Ultimate Parkour Challenge in 2010, and played the role of Finch in the 2011 movie Freerunner.

His "Doyle's Travel Story" won the award for "Best International Series" at the YouTube Streamy Awards (2013)

÷==Competition statistics==

=== Red Bull Art of Motion ===
Single-athlete events
Outcome	Year	Location
Winner	2007	Vienna, Austria
3rd place	2011	London, UK
8th place	2011	Yokohama, Japan
Winner	2011	São Paulo, Brazil
8th place	2012	Santorini, Greece

Team events
Outcome	Year	Location	Team name
Runner-up	2011	Failaka Island, Kuwait	Team Qaruh
