= World Chase Tag =

International parkour tag championship

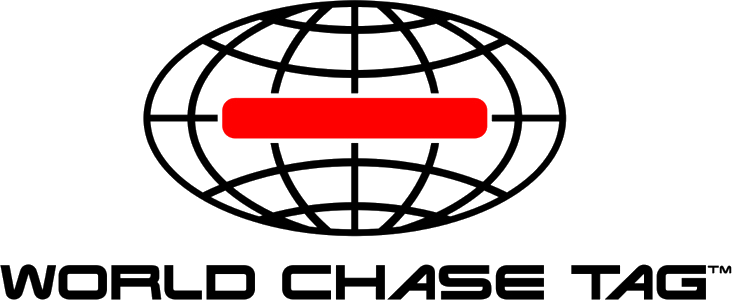
- Sport: Game of tag
- Founder: Christian and Damien Devaux
- Broadcasters: ESPN, NBCSN, Channel 4
- Website: www.worldchasetag.com

World Chase Tag is an international championship for competitive parkour involving the game of tag. Events have been televised on NBCSN in the United States, and on Channel 4, ITV and BBC Three in the United Kingdom. Events have also attracted millions of views online.

World Chase Tag was founded in Britain by Christian Devaux in 2012, with his brother Damien joining the organisation the following year. The inspiration for the sport came after a game of tag between Christian and his child.

== Rules ==
Matches are played between two teams of up to six players over a series of 16 rounds. Each round is contested between one member of each team, with one player as the chaser and their opponent as the evader.

Players begin the round at opposite sides of a 12m × 12m square known as "The Quad", which is filled with various obstacles that players move over, under and through using parkour skills. The chaser has 20 seconds to tag the evader with their hand. If either player steps foot outside of The Quad they forfeit the round.

Points can only be scored by the evading team. A successful tag results in that player becoming the evader for the next round and no points being awarded. A successful evasion results in that player's team scoring a point, and the evader retaining that role for the next round. The losing player is replaced by a teammate who chases. Rounds are separated by 25 second rest breaks.

The team with the most points after 16 rounds wins. Ties result in a "sudden-death chase-off", which consists of a pair of rounds with each team chasing in one and evading in the other. The team with the longest evasion time wins. If this results in a further tie (i.e. both teams successfully evade for 20 seconds) the process is repeated.

== Major events ==
Event	Date		Location	Winners	Notes
World Chase Tag	18 December 2016	World Championship	Trinity Buoy Wharf, London, UK	Marrero Gang	The Storror Chase Off. First major World Chase Tag competition.
World Chase Tag 2	2017	World Championship	York Hall, London, UK	Marrero Gang	
World Chase Tag 3	9 September 2018	World Championship	York Hall, London, UK	Marrero Gang	
World Chase Tag Euro 19	26 June 2019	Continental Championship	York Hall, London, UK	Blacklist	
World Chase Tag 4	25 August 2019	World Championship	York Hall, London, UK	United	First event to be televised, in edited highlight programme broadcast on Channel 4 in the UK and NBCSN in the US.
World Chase Tag – USA 2020	16 October 2020	National Championship	Coca-Cola Roxy, Atlanta, Georgia, USA	Apex	First event outside of UK. Event broadcast by NBCSN and made into a 6-part series by Channel 4 in the UK.
World Chase Tag 5 – USA Championship	6 August 2021	National Championship	Goodyear Hall, Akron OH, USA	Apex	
World Chase Tag 5 – UK Championship	8 November 2021	National Championship	York Hall, London, UK	Phat	
World Chase Tag 5 – World Championship	27–29 May 2022	World Championship	York Hall, London, UK	Apex ETH	Televised on BBC Three. Including the first women's exhibition match.
World Chase Tag 6 – USA Championship	7–9 October 2022	National Championship	Esports Stadium Arlington, TX, USA	Apex Moon	
World Chase Tag 6 – USA Women's Championship	7–9 October 2022	National Championship	Esports Stadium Arlington, TX, USA	Kunoichi	Creation of the first women's league.
World Chase Tag 6 – Pan American Championship	3–5 March 2023	Continental Championship	Greater Columbus Convention Centre – Columbus, OH, USA	Apex Sun	
World Chase Tag 6 – French Championship	8–9 July 2023	National Championship	TwitchCon Paris, France	Parkour59	First French Championship
World Chase Tag 6 – French Women's Championship	8–9 July 2023	National Championship	TwitchCon Paris, France	KIMEO Volt	
World Chase Tag 6 – World Championship	26–28 April 2024	World Championship	Évry-Courcouronnes, Paris, France	Hollywood Freerunners	
World Chase Tag 6 – Women's Division World Championship	26–28 April 2024	World Championship	Évry-Courcouronnes, Paris, France	Urban Corp Nano	
World Chase Tag 7 – French Championship	5 July 2025	National Championship	Évry-Courcouronnes, France	Parkour59	Parkour59 becomes double French Champion (2 seasons in a row). Vice-World Champion KIMEO fails to qualify for WCT7 Worlds.
World Chase Tag 7 – USA Championship	12–13 July 2025	National Championship	Dexterity Depot, Camp Hill, PA, USA	NYX	Team from Georgia. Both US champions this season are from Georgia.
World Chase Tag 7 – USA Women's Championship	12–13 July 2025	National Championship	Dexterity Depot, Camp Hill, PA, USA	Anarchy	First US team to secure an international transfer (Eva Yamani from France). B.O.B. (Baron of Bolt/MVP) joins Anarchy.
World Chase Tag 7 – World Championship	6–7 June 2026	World Championship	Évry-Courcouronnes, Paris, France	Rooftop Kings	
World Chase Tag 7 – Women's Division World Championship	6–7 June 2026	World Championship	Évry-Courcouronnes, Paris, France	Volt	

== See also ==
- Obstacle course racing
- Ultimate Tag
- Ultimate Kho Kho
