= World Freerunning and Parkour Federation =

The World Freerunning Parkour Federation (WFPF) is an international federation or organization that was established in 2007. Its focus is to bring together patrons of Parkour and Freerunning and aims to bring the sport and philosophy to the mainstream audience.

== History ==
The World Freerunning Parkour Federation (WFPF) was founded in January 2007 as a partnership between Ruff Magic Entertainment, a New Jersey limited liability company, and eight Parkour and Freerunning athletes. The athletes, Daniel Ilabaca, Ryan Doyle, Tim Shieff, Oleg Vorslav, Victor Lopez, Gabriel Nunez, Paul Darnell and Richard King, and the company principals, Victor Bevine, David Thompson and production partner Francis Lyons came together with the stated purpose of bringing the sport of Parkour to mainstream American audiences through television and other media and live formats. Other member athletes of the WFPF include Brian Orosco, Miguel Southee Jr., King David, Michael Turner and Daniel Arroyo from the U.S. Pip Andersen, Philip Doyle, Ben Jenkin from the UK, Marcus Gustafsson and Filip Ljungberg of Sweden, and Justin "Jet" Sheaffer from the U.S.

== MTV ==
In 2009, the WFPF partnered with MTV to develop and produce MTV’S ULTIMATE PARKOUR CHALLENGE, a one-hour competitive format special starring WFPF member athletes Daniel Ilabaca, Ryan Doyle, Tim Shieff, Pip Andersen, Brian Orosco, King David, Michael Turner and Daniel Arroyo.

On May 6, 2010, the first of 6 episodes (the first 3 were broadcast live) of ULTIMATE PARKOUR CHALLENGE (or UPC) aired on MTV, with US athlete Brian Orosco replaced by the UK’s Ben Jenkin. Each week the competitors were put in a new environment to compete, with the first episode taking place on the historic Queen Mary Hotel, in Long Beach, California. Other environments included Venice Beach, a Hollywood Western Town, a castle in the Hollywood Hills, a shopping mall and Downtown LA’s Pershing Square. The show garnered 3.5 million viewers in the 12-24 year old male demo and is still the most viewed Parkour event in history.

== Other projects ==
The WFPF partnered with Athletes for Hope, a charitable organization founded by Tony Hawk, Lance Armstrong and Mia Hamm among others, to facilitate opportunities for athletes to serve as role models for underserved youth around the U.S. WFPF athletes have donated their services to events at the Harlem Children’s Zone as well as at the New York Fresh Air Fund.

The WFPF website is designed for the parkour community and dedicated to its interests and concerns. The site combines parkour news, event promotion, parkour athlete interviews and highlighted bios and affiliate information and videos. The website includes a social-networking site similar to Facebook. The website currently has profiles posted from every U.S. state and over 60 countries worldwide.

Part of the mission of the WFPF is to fill any voids in the parkour community and one example of this is their release of the KO parkour shoe. "KO" is the brand name for WFPF merchandise and is described by the WFPF as their motto saying "to Know Obstacles is to Know freedom." The WFPF roots in charitable work have led to their approach being to focus on helping others overcome any obstacle in their path and the KO motto represents this focus. Using their sister site KnowObstacles.com the WFPF has proven true to their motto to provide for the parkour community as they developed a parkour shoe that many recognize as one of the best shoes out there made specifically for training parkour and free running. The most notable qualities are the lightweight feel, simple design and grip on the sole.

== Competition and Controversy ==
In the weeks leading up to production of the MTV special, there was considerable controversy within the Parkour community both for and against the WFPF over its choice to support a competitive format television show and whether that violated the organization’s mission statement. In the main, judgment was deferred until the airing of the MTV show, due in large measure to the esteem in which the WFPF athletes are held in the worldwide Parkour community.

== WFPF management ==
According to the WFPF website, the Ruff Magic principals, Victor Bevine and David Thompson have over thirty years combined experience working in youth development, having directed and developed arts and intervention programs for at-risk youth. Francis Lyons is the Emmy Award-winning executive producer of MTV’s hit series MADE, and is a partner at One Louder Productions.

== World Parkour Championship ==
In 2018 WFPF launched the World Parkour Championship #WPC series holding their first event in Mardin, Turkey in June in partnership with Case Productions. Future WPC events are in the works around the world.

=== Results ===
- 2018 World Parkour Championship Mardin: MEN (SPEED) 1st. Erik Mukhametshin, 2nd. Joey Adrian, 3rd. Tavon Mcvey. // MEN (FREESTYLE) 1st. Erik Mukhametshin, 2nd. Joey Adrian, 3rd. Sean Higgins.

== Instructor Certification ==
WFPF launched a Coaching Certification Program in 2012. WFPF has held parkour instructor certifications in USA, Canada, Thailand, Scotland, Wales, England, Portugal. As of the Spring of 2019 over 1000 parkour instructors have been attended and been certified by WFPF. In 2016 WFPF certification was named the official Parkour certification for British Columbia Gymnastics in Canada. WFPF also offers online certifications for Parkour instructor assistants as well as Parkour Competition Judge certifications which are required to judge any WFPF competition. Many WFPF certifications are done in partnership and with the endorsement of IPTC- International Professional Training Certification which was established in 1978.
