= Mike Christie (director) =

English TV director and filmmaker

- Born: Manchester, England
- Occupations: Film and TV Director and Producer
- Years active: 1991–present
- Known for: Jump London (2003); New Order: Decades (2018); Accelerate or Die! (2023); The Pilgrimage of Gilbert & George (2024); Nick Cave’s Veiled World (2025)

Mike Christie is a British film and television director and producer who has made films for the BBC, Channel 4, Sky, Discovery, History Channel, Apple, Showtime and Red Bull.

== Early life ==
His career began in the 1990s working in the music industry and with the artist and filmmaker Derek Jarman – whom he met at meetings of Act Up London – on projects including the book At Your Own Risk. Other early collaborators included Pet Shop Boys and Suede with whom he worked from 1992 to 1997.

In 1997, he co-created Drop the Debt, the mainstream music and entertainment industries campaign of the Jubilee 2000 movement, fronted by Bono and others, and led to the cancellation of more than $100 billion in debt owed by 35 of the poorest countries.

== Career ==
Christie’s career has included documentary, music, arts, sport and live-event work.

== Parkour films ==
In 2003 Christie directed Jump London, followed by Jump Britain in 2005. The Guardian later described Jump London as the documentary that introduced parkour to a mass British audience and noted that the term "free running" was coined during its production. Christie told Smithsonian that the first Channel 4 broadcast attracted an estimated three million viewers and that the film was subsequently exported to 65 additional countries; the magazine reported that parkour's online presence expanded "almost overnight" following the broadcast. Parkour UK credits the two documentaries with playing a crucial role in the discipline's adoption in Britain. Parkour Generations later described Christie as the maker of the "seminal" Jump London and Jump Britain, stating that the documentaries "quite literally put parkour on the map"; the organisation also credited him with devising its name. Parkour researcher Julie Angel identified Jump London and Jump Britain among the screen works through which the discipline rapidly reached a global audience, and traced the introduction of the English term "freerunning" to the production of Jump London. Angel also wrote that watching Jump London led her to make parkour the subject of her subsequent documentary and doctoral research. In 2010, the parkour publication Jump Magazine profiled Christie in an interview titled "The Godfather Speaks".

Screenwriters Neal Purvis and Robert Wade later said that seeing Sébastien Foucan in Jump London led to his casting as Mollaka in the opening foot chase of the James Bond film Casino Royale.

Following the success of Jump London, in 2004 Mike Christie founded production company Carbon Media with producer Mike Smith, which was sold to ITV in 2009. Christie was a director of the Carbon production The Big Art Project, which combined a Channel 4 television series with a UK-wide public-art commissioning initiative centred on six commissions. Its associated Big Art Mob was described by The Guardian as the UK's first interactive map of public art, while the Live Art Development Agency described the wider project as "the biggest arts commission in the history of Channel 4".

== Sports and arts documentaries ==
In 2010 Christie directed the Channel 4 feature documentary Inside Incredible Athletes, part of the broadcaster's two-year build-up to the 2012 Summer Paralympics. He subsequently directed several films for London 2012 Ceremonies. In 2014 he wrote and directed I am the Flame, narrated by Ian McKellen, for the inaugural Paralympic Heritage Flame ceremony at Stoke Mandeville ahead of the 2014 Winter Paralympics in Sochi.

His subsequent sports and arts films and documentaries included Concrete Circus (2011), The Secret Life of Buildings (2011), Danny MacAskill’s Imaginate (2013), The Art of China with Andrew Graham-Dixon (2014), Sir Alex Ferguson: Secrets of Success (2015), and Football: A Brief History by Alfie Allen (2016).

In 2020 Christie produced and directed Offended by Irvine Welsh, a Sky Arts documentary in which Irvine Welsh examined offence, cancel culture and creative risk in the arts.

During this period Christie worked through his production banner ChristieHQ. By 2021, Danny MacAskill’s Imaginate, one of the company’s productions, had accumulated nearly 100 million views on YouTube.

== Music documentaries ==
In 2017 and 2018 he directed the music documentaries Hansa Studios: By the Wall 1976–90, New Order: Decades and Suede: The Insatiable Ones. New Order: Decades was first broadcast on Sky Arts in the UK before its US premiere on Showtime, while New Order: Decades and Suede: The Insatiable Ones screened at CPH:DOX in 2019. Reviewing New Order: Decades, the Financial Times awarded the film five stars, describing it as a "compelling documentary" and concluding that its finale was "gloriously uplifting". Hansa Studios: By the Wall 1976–90 was shortlisted for a Grierson Award. Christie's 2025 Sky documentary about Nick Cave’s songwriting and creative process, Nick Cave’s Veiled World, was reviewed in The Independent. Nick Cave's Veiled World was selected for the Sound & Vision programme at CPH:DOX in 2026.

In 2026 he directed Wham! 10 Days in China, a feature documentary about Wham!'s 1985 concerts in Beijing and Guangzhou, produced by Supercollider with Sony Music Vision and released theatrically worldwide via Trafalgar Releasing before broadcast on BBC Two and BBC iPlayer. The film received positive reviews from critics. In The Times, Kevin Maher awarded the film four stars out of five, describing it as "excellent" and praising director Mike Christie for having "smartly collated" the archival material into a compelling narrative, while adding that he "wish[ed] this excellent film were longer". Writing in The Irish Times, Tara Brady described Christie as "one of Britain's most accomplished chroniclers of popular music", calling the documentary a film that "poignantly captures just how alien Wham! were in China" during the 1985 tour. In the Irish Independent, John Meagher wrote that "Christie does fine work composing it all into shape", awarding the film four stars out of five.

== Other recent work ==
In 2021, Zinc Media Group launched the production label Supercollider, led by Christie.

Through Supercollider, Christie directed the documentary Accelerate or Die (2023), featuring artist Jake Chapman and focusing on debates around accelerationism, technology and the climate crisis. He later directed the Sky Arts feature documentary The Pilgrimage of Gilbert & George (2024). In 2022, Human Pinball (Red Bull TV) was nominated for a Sports Emmy in the category Outstanding Studio or Production Design/Art Direction, with Christie credited as a creative director. More recently, Christie has directed films engaging with editorial themes around AI and responsibility, including a one-minute G42 film featuring Lewis Hamilton (2024) and The Dreamer featuring Andrea Kimi Antonelli (G42 / Mercedes-AMG Petronas), which centres on AI’s growing role in society.,

== Awards and nominations ==
- Jump London – nominated for the Royal Television Society Programme Awards (Arts) (2003).
- Body Talk – winner at the FOCAL International Awards (2005).
- The Big Art Project (multi-platform) – winner, RTS Innovation Award (2007). It also received three nominations at the BAFTA TV Craft Awards (2008). It won the Media Guardian Innovation Award (2008).
- Inside Incredible Athletes – nominated for Best Popular Factual Programme at the Broadcast Awards (2011).
- Hansa Studios: By the Wall 1976–90 – shortlisted for Best Arts/Music Documentary at the Grierson Awards (2018).
- Football: A Brief History – nominated for Best Factual Series at the RTS Southern Centre Awards (2018).
- Human Pinball – nominated at the 43rd Sports Emmy Awards in Outstanding Studio or Production Design/Art Direction (2022).
- Channel 4’s London 2012 Paralympics coverage – winner, BAFTA TV Award for Sport and Live Event (2013).
- The Pilgrimage of Gilbert and George – nominated (Arts) at the Rose d’Or Awards (2024). It won a Bronze Tower (The Arts) at the New York Festivals TV & Film Awards (2025).
- Supercharged (G42) – at the EVCOM London Live & Film Awards 2025, the project won Gold for Best Brand Communication Event and Innovation & Technology, and received Silver awards for Best Experiential Event, Best B2E (Business to Employee) Event, Most Creative Event Delivery, and Best Experience & Engagement Strategy.
- Nick Cave's Veiled World – nominated for the Royal Television Society Programme Awards (Arts) (2026) and winner of the Gold Tower in Documentary: Music at the New York Festivals TV & Film Awards (2026).

== Selected filmography ==
=== Documentaries and factual ===
- Body Talk (2004)
- Little Britain Down Under (2007)
- Concrete Circus (2011)
- The Secret Life of Buildings (2011)
- The Art of China with Andrew Graham-Dixon (2014)
- Sir Alex Ferguson: Secrets of Success (2015)
- Football: A Brief History (2016)
- The Art Show (2017)
- Hansa Studios: By the Wall 1976–90 (2018) – Grierson Award shortlisted
- Suede: The Insatiable Ones (2018)
- New Order: Decades (2018)
- Space Jump (2022)
- Accelerate or Die! (2023)
- The Pilgrimage of Gilbert & George (2024)
- Nick Cave’s Veiled World (2025)
- Wham! 10 Days in China (2026)

=== Branded and short-form ===
- Danny MacAskill’s Imaginate (2013)
- Human Pinball (2021)

=== Multi-platform and live work ===
- Big Art (Channel 4 multi-platform project)
- London 2012 Ceremonies (2012)
- New Order Education Entertainment Recreation (Live At Alexandra Palace) (2018)
- UAE 48th National Day (2019)
- Supercharged (G42, 2025) – creative director
