= Transporter =

Transporter may refer to:

- Transporter (vehicles), types of vehicles designed to transport items
- Transporter wagon, a railway car designed to carry another railway car
- Volkswagen Transporter, a model of van
- Transporter bridge, a bridge which carries cars across a river in a suspended gondola
- Middlesbrough Transporter Bridge, the transporter bridge in Middlesbrough, England

== Film and television ==
- The Transporter (1950 film), an Italian film directed by Giorgio Simonelli
- Transporter (Star Trek), a fictional type of teleportation device in Star Trek
- Transporter (franchise), a series of action films starring Jason Statham
  - The Transporter, a 2002 action film starring Jason Statham
  - Transporter 2, a 2005 action film starring Jason Statham
  - Transporter 3, a 2008 action film starring Jason Statham
  - The Transporter Refueled, a 2015 action film reboot of the franchise
- Transporter: The Series, a 2012 TV series starring Chris Vance
- The Transporters, a 2006 direct-to-DVD animated TV series for autistic children

== Music ==
- Transporter (album), a 2004 album by Immaculate Machine
- "Transporter", song by Pinchers (singer)
- "Transporter", a song from Lil Baby's Harder Than Ever (2018)

== Science and technology ==
- Membrane transport protein
- Neurotransmitter transporter
- Transport protein
- Transporter-1 to Transporter-15, a series of SpaceX missions launched on Falcon 9

== Others ==
- The Transporters, an animated series developed by the Autism Research Centre, University of Cambridge

== See also ==
- Teleportation (disambiguation)
- Transported, a 1913 Australian film
