= Transporter (franchise) =

French action-thriller film series

- Official franchise logo
- Created by: Luc Besson; Robert Mark Kamen
- Original work: The Transporter (2002)
- Owner: EuropaCorp
- Years: 2002–2015

Films and television
- Films: Original series: The Transporter (2002); Transporter 2 (2005); Transporter 3 (2008); Reboot: The Transporter Refueled (2015)
- Television series: Transporter: The Series (2012–2014)

Audio
- Soundtracks: The Transporter; Transporter 2; Transporter 3; The Transporter Refueled

Transporter (French: Le Transporteur) is a French action thriller film franchise, comprising four films released between 2002 and 2015, and a television series. Jason Statham plays Frank Martin in the first three movies, a professional freelance courier driver. Chris Vance portrays Martin in the sequel television series, and Ed Skrein portrays him in the fourth film, a reboot.

== Background ==
Frank Martin is the protagonist of the films and television series. He is portrayed as a former Special Forces operative who was in command of a search and destroy unit, with a background including operations "in and out of" Lebanon, Syria and Sudan. He received the Bronze Star. He retires from service after becoming fatigued and disenchanted with his superior officers, and uses his skills as a private driver for hire while maintaining an apparently legitimate life living off of his army pension. Martin maintains a strict code of conduct, and expects his clients to adhere to his rules. The character is portrayed with varied backgrounds in different installments of the franchise. In the television series, it is revealed that he was orphaned as a child, enlisted in the British Army as an adult and later transferred to Special Air Service. In the film, The Transporter Refueled, his father Frank Martin Sr. is a former British spy who retires to work on his relationship with his son.

== Films ==
Film	U.S. release date	Director(s)	Screenwriter(s)	Story by	Producer(s)
Original series
The Transporter	11 October 2002	Louis Leterrier & Corey Yuen	Luc Besson & Robert Mark Kamen	—N/a	Luc Besson & Stephen Chasman
Transporter 2	2 September 2005	Louis Leterrier	Luc Besson & Robert Mark Kamen	—N/a	Luc Besson & Stephen Chasman
Transporter 3	26 November 2008	Olivier Megaton	Luc Besson & Robert Mark Kamen	—N/a	Luc Besson & Stephen Chasman
Reboot
The Transporter Refueled	9 September 2015	Camille Delamarre	Adam Cooper, Bill Collage & Luc Besson	—N/a	Mark Gao & Luc Besson

=== Original series ===
==== The Transporter (2002) ====
Frank Martin (Jason Statham) is a British mercenary driver living in France known only as "The Transporter"; he will transport anything, no questions asked, always on time, and is known as the best in the business. He strictly follows three rules when transporting: Rule Number 1: "Once the deal is made, it is final," Rule Number 2: "No names," and Rule Number 3: "Never open the package." Frank inadvertently breaks his own rule, opens the package and finds a bound and gagged woman. As a result, he finds himself involved in a human trafficking plot.

==== Transporter 2 (2005) ====
Martin is hired as the driver for the wealthy family of politician Jefferson Billings in Miami, Florida. Frank bonds with his young son, whom he drives to school every day. When the boy is kidnapped, Frank acts in order to protect his young "package" and his family. Eventually, he unravels a scheme involving an international drugs cartel and biological weapons. Inspector Tarconi plays a more prominent role in this film. It is established that he and Frank are now friends, and Tarconi goes as far as to lie to the police to cover for Frank.

==== Transporter 3 (2008) ====
Frank is pressured into transporting Valentina (Natalya Rudakova) the kidnapped daughter of Leonid Vasilev (Jeroen Krabbé), head of the Environmental Protection Agency for Ukraine, from Marseille through Stuttgart and Budapest until he ends up in Odesa on the Black Sea. Along the way, with the help of Inspector Tarconi (François Berléand), Frank has to contend with the people who strong armed him to take the job, agents sent by Vasilev to intercept him, and the general non-cooperation of his passenger, who he realises is the package midway through the film. Despite Valentina's cynical disposition and Frank's resistance to getting involved, Frank and Valentina fall for each other, while escaping from one life-threatening situation after another.

=== Reboot ===
==== The Transporter Refueled (2015) ====
In May 2013, at the 2013 Cannes Film Festival, a new reboot trilogy was announced with EuropaCorp and China's Fundamental Films co-producing and distributing the titles. The films were to be budgeted between $30 million to $40 million each and at least one was planned to be shot in China. Luc Besson was to co-finance, distribute, produce and write all the films. English actor Ed Skrein replaced Jason Statham as Frank Martin on the fourth installment of the series. The fourth film, The Transporter Refueled, directed by Camille Delamarre, was released in the United States on 4 September 2015.

== Television ==
Series	Season	Episodes	First released	Last released	Showrunner(s)	Network(s)
Transporter: The Series	2	24	11 October 2012	14 December 2014	Brad Turner, Fred Fuchs & Timothy J. Lea	M6

=== Transporter: The Series (2012–2014) ===
Transporter: The Series is a television series based on the Transporter films which premiered in 2012 on 11 October in Germany on RTL, and on 6 December in France on M6. Chris Vance took over the role of Frank from Jason Statham and was joined by Hungarian actress Andrea Osvárt, who played Carla, the leading female role in the series, a former Intelligence agent who organises his missions, and French actor François Berléand, the only returning actor from the film series, who reprised his role as Inspector Tarconi. The series was intended to premiere on Cinemax but they pulled out due to production problems. TNT picked it up and aired both seasons.

== Cast and crew ==
=== Principal cast ===
Character	Original series			Reboot	Transporter: The Series	
Character	The Transporter	Transporter 2	Transporter 3	The Transporter Refueled	Season 1	Season 2
Character	2002	2005	2008	2015	2012–13	2014
Frank Martin The Transporter	Jason Statham	Jason Statham	Jason Statham	Ed Skrein	Chris Vance	Chris Vance
Inspector Marcelle Tarconi	François Berléand	François Berléand	François Berléand		François Berléand	François Berléand
Lai Kwai	Shu Qi					
Darren "Wall Street" Bettencourt	Matt Schulze					
Mr. Kwai	Ric Young					
Gianni Chellini		Alessandro Gassman				
Audrey Billings		Amber Valletta				
Lola		Kate Nauta				
Stappleton		Keith David				
Jack Billings		Hunter Clary				
Max		Shannon Briggs				
Valentina Vasileva			Natalya Rudakova			
Johnson			Robert Knepper			
Leonid Tomilenko			Jeroen Krabbé			
Leonid's Aide			Alex Kobold			
Malcom Manville			David Atrakchi			
Flag			Yann Sundberg			
Ice			Eriq Ebouaney			
Frank Martin Sr.				Ray Stevenson		Mentioned
Anna				Loan Chabanol		
María				Tatjana Pajković		
Gina				Gabriella Wright		
Qiao				Wenxia Yu		
Arkady Karasov				Radivoje Bukvić		
Maissa				Noémie Lenoir		
Dieter Hausmann					Charly Hübner	Charly Hübner
Carla Valeri					Andrea Osvárt	
Juliette Dubois					Delphine Chanéac	
Caterina "Cat" Boldieu						Violante Placido
Jules Faroux						Mark Rendall
Olivier Dassin						Dhaffer L'Abidine
Zara Knight						Elyse Levesque

=== Additional crew ===
Crew member	The Transporter (2002)	Transporter 2 (2005)	Transporter 3 (2008)	The Transporter Refueled (2015)
Director	Corey Yuen	Louis Leterrier	Olivier Megaton	Camille Delamarre
Producer(s)	Luc Besson & Stephen Chasman	Luc Besson & Stephen Chasman	Luc Besson & Stephen Chasman	Mark Gao & Luc Besson
Writer(s)	Luc Besson & Robert Mark Kamen	Luc Besson & Robert Mark Kamen	Luc Besson & Robert Mark Kamen	Luc Besson, Adam Cooper & Bill Collage
Composer	Stanley Clarke	Alexandre Azaria	Alexandre Azaria	Alexandre Azaria
Editor	Pierre Morel	Vincent Tabaillon & Christine Lucas-Navarro	Carlo Rizzo & Camille Delamarre	Julien Rey
Cinematographer	Nicolas Trembasiewicz	Mitchell Amundsen	Giovanni Fiore Coltellacci	Christophe Collette
Production company(s)	Canal+ TF1 Films; EuropaCorp; Current Entertainment	Canal+ TPS Star; TF1 Films; EuropaCorp; Current Entertainment	Canal+ TF1 Films; EuropaCorp; Apipoulaï Prod. Grive Productions; Current Entertainment	Canal+ TF1 Films; EuropaCorp; Belga Films; Relativity Media
Distributor	20th Century Fox		Lionsgate Films	EuropaCorp
Runtime	92 minutes	87 minutes	104 minutes	96 minutes
Release date	11 October 2002	2 September 2005	26 November 2008	4 September 2015

== Reception ==
=== Box office performance ===
Film	Release date	Box office gross			Box office ranking		Budget	Ref.
Film	Release date	North America	Other territories	Worldwide	All time North America	All time worldwide	Budget	Ref.
The Transporter	11 October 2002	$25,296,447	$18,632,485	$43,928,932	#2,660		$21,000,000	
Transporter 2	2 September 2005	$43,095,856	$42,071,783	$85,167,639	#1,701		$32,000,000	
Transporter 3	26 November 2008	$31,715,062	$77,264,487	$108,979,549	#2,284		$40,000,000	
The Transporter Refueled	4 September 2015	$16,029,670	$56,600,000	$72,629,670	#3,669		$22,000,000	
Total		$116,137,035	$194,568,755	$310,705,790			$115,000,000	

=== Critical and public response ===
Film	Rotten Tomatoes	Metacritic	CinemaScore
The Transporter	54% (128 reviews)	51 (27 reviews)	B+
Transporter 2	52% (122 reviews)	56 (29 reviews)	B+
Transporter 3	40% (115 reviews)	51 (26 reviews)	B−
The Transporter Refueled	15% (105 reviews)	32 (24 reviews)	B−

== Other media ==
=== Other appearances ===
In 2002, Jason Statham appeared in the music video for Muzik by Knoc-Turn'Al Feat. Samuel Christian. The song was part of the soundtrack for the first movie. The video uses both footage from the film and newly shot material showing Statham as Frank Martin driving a 2002 BMW 745Li E66.

Statham made a small appearance in the 2004 film Collateral, credited as "Airport Man". Louis Leterrier interpreted Statham's scene as a portrayal of his Transporter character Frank Martin.

Zebbie Gillese voices Frank Martin / Transporter in the 2021 Netflix original film America: The Motion Picture, in which he is depicted as the stagecoach driver of Benedict "Cosby" Arnold.

In 2024, Statham starred in an advertising campaign of the new Volkswagen Transporter van. As a reference to his Transporter role, the commercial shows a package being delivered. "The Transporter needed" and later "The Transporter is back" is shown.
