= List of Transporter: The Series episodes =

Transporter: The Series is an English-language Canadian-French-German action television series that was broadcast from 2012 to 2014. Based on the Transporter action film franchise by Luc Besson, it featured Chris Vance in the main role as Frank Martin, the Transporter. Two seasons were produced, each comprising 12 episodes.

== Series overview ==
Season	Episodes	Originally aired		DVD & Blu-ray release date	
Season	Episodes	Originally aired		Region 2	
Season	Episodes	Season premiere	Season finale	Germany	France
1	12	11 October 2012	3 January 2013	21 December 2012	23 January 2013
2	12	5 October 2014	14 December 2014	N/A	N/A

== Episodes ==
=== Season 1 (2012–13) ===
The series as so far been presented in a different episode order on every channel it has aired (see above). It first aired in Germany, however channel RTL left two episodes unaired. The episodes were next broadcast in France on M6. However, the episodes are presented here in the order they were broadcast in Canada on HBO Canada as this airing order is generally considered to be "the most correct" order of the episodes in terms of plotline chronology.

No. overall	No. in season	Title	Directed by	Written by	German air date	French air date	Canadian air date	Prod. code	France viewers (millions)
1	1	"Trojan Horsepower" "Tod dem Fortschritt!" "Prototype"	Brad Turner	Story by : Mahin Choudhary & David Kashyap; Screenplay by : Steve Lightfoot	29 Nov 2012	6 December 2012	4 Jan 2013	112	3,100,000 (13.3%)
In Nice, after participating in a prison escape that unfolds in a similar way as the opening scene of the first film, Frank meets Juliette for the first time. Later, Dieter introduces him to his friend Trina, who hires him to deliver a new eco-friendly engine prototype invented by her father on time to the Paris Motor Show. With Trina as his passenger, Frank races towards Paris, but a dangerous hitman, nicknamed "The Wolf", has been hired by automotive and fuel lobbies to eliminate him before he can complete his mission and destroy this major breakthrough. Unfortunately, the prototype, which is installed in Frank's car, emits a GPS signal which does not turn off, enabling The Wolf to easily track Frank and cling to his heels...
2	2	"Payback" "Vergeltung!" "Frères d'Armes"	Brad Turner & Bruce McDonald	Story by : Alexander Ruemelin, Joseph Mallozzi & Paul Mullie; Screenplay by : Joseph Mallozzi & Paul Mullie	8 Nov 2012	10 January 2013	4 Jan 2013	106	2,650,000 (11.3%)
Frank's latest job goes completely wrong: he loses his package of drugs in a holdup and is accused by his Russian gangster employer of having embezzled the money. To prove his innocence, Frank embarks on a search for the real culprits and through fancy hotels and rundown buildings the trail leads him to old friends from his SAS unit. The soldiers were attempting to settle a score from the past, by using him as a scapegoat while enriching themselves in the process. But when both they and Frank find themselves in danger from the Russian mobster who's out for blood, they must reconcile and fight side by side - just like old times.
3	3	"The General's Daughter (Pilot)" "Eine Neue Mission!" "Protection Rapprochée"	Stephen Williams	Alexander Ruemelin, Joseph Mallozzi & Paul Mullie	11 Oct 2012	6 December 2012	11 Jan 2013	101	3,820,000 (14.1%)
After completing an eventful drop in Marseille, Frank is sent to Berlin, where he is assigned to transport Delia Weigert (Rachel Skarsten), a rich young socialite, to a safe house. Her father, a former influential general in the army (Barry Flatman), is part of an international criminal organization but wants out, and Delia is now in grave danger with a German crime lord (Uwe Ochsenknecht) threatening to kidnap her. With the enemy closing in, Frank must get Delia on a flight back to America, but a sudden betrayal places Delia in deadly jeopardy, and Frank must use all his skills to save her.
4	4	"Harvest" "Vaterliebe" "À Cœur Ouvert"	Andy Mikita & Brad Turner	Carl Binder	18 Oct 2012	6 December 2012	18 Jan 2013	104	2,200,000 (15.7%)
While transporting a package, Frank notices the police are on his trail. Ignoring his rules, he opens the package and finds a stolen heart in a cooler, meant for transplantation in a hospital. Frank faces a dilemma when he figures out that his client, Drago Sujic (Mike Dopud), one of the most powerful crime lords in southern France, stole the heart to save his own son, who suffers from a congenital heart defect, and when Inspector Tarconi informs him that another dying boy is waiting at the hospital for the heart. Should he honor his commitment and deliver the package or return it to its initial beneficiary?
5	5	"Dead Drop" "Plan B" "À L'Aveugle"	T.J. Scott	Story by : Benjamin Sokolowski; Screenplay by : Carl Binder & Steve Bailie	1 Nov 2012	13 December 2012	25 Jan 2013	108	3,440,000 (12.9%)
On a mission in Philadelphia, Frank finds out his package is Jack Perkins, his old C.I.A. instructor. The blind man is trying to prove his innocence, while an agency mole is attempting to frame him for leaking confidential information and getting fellow agents unmasked. To save his and his client's lives, Frank has only one solution: find a USB key containing evidence that can clear Jack's name and reveal the real mole's identity...
6	6	"Hot Ice" "Blutdiamanten" "Diamants de Sang"	Brad Turner	Steve Bailie	6 Dec 2012	3 January 2013	1 Feb 2013	109	3,209,000 (11.8%)
In Toronto, Frank is asked to pick up a package containing a data stick holding sensitive content implicating a senior industrialist in the African blood diamond trade from a high-security bank vault and bring it to a specific address. Immediately upon leaving the vault, he is attacked by a hit squad posing as security guards and finds himself locked inside the building. To make matters worse, an attractive woman security officer (Katheryn Winnick) falsely accuses him of being responsible for the death of her colleague, who was caught in the firefight and in order to prevent Frank's escape, she handcuffs him to herself - difficult conditions when you have a hit squad on your tail...
7	7	"Give the Guy a Hand" "Im Namen der Ehre" "La Main Invisible"	George Mihalka	Katie Ford	N/A	3 January 2013	8 Feb 2013	110	3,200,000 (12.8%)
As he's waiting for his package to be delivered in a Toronto parking lot, Frank finds himself faced with a series of strange coincidences. He understands he fell into a trap when the police throw him in jail, accusing him of a crime he didn't commit. His imprisonment is supposed to allow him to transport a very protected package out of the prison walls: the hand of a construction company boss who's just been murdered...
8	8	"Sharks" "Große Haie und Kleine Fische" "Requins"	Bruce McDonald	Joseph Mallozzi & Paul Mullie	15 Nov 2012	13 December 2012	15 Feb 2013	103	2,830,000 (12.6%)
Frank must transport a million euros from Paris to Marseille while racing against two other elite runners each with the same package and destination. The client whose transporter wins will gain an important missile contract. Word of the race has reached two gangs, one from China and one from Jamaica, that decide to try and hijack the money but Frank, who needs to prove he's the one and only worthwhile transporter on the market, doesn't intend to let himself be swindled... The task is further complicated by a mysterious hitchhiker, who can not be shaken off and wants to know everything about Frank. Frank manages to end up as the lone transporter to finish the race, but victory is bittersweet, due to the loss of an old friend, who was one of the other two competing transporters.
9	9	"City of Love" "Die Letzten Stunden von Paris" "Une Bombe dans Paris"	Brad Turner & Andy Mikita	Alexander Ruemelin	13 Dec 2012	27 December 2012	22 Feb 2013	107	3,091,000 (12.2%)
Frank is hired to bring a package from the south of France to Paris, which alerts the dogs at a vehicle checkpoint. After being chased by the police and reaching the agreed transfer point, he realizes the package he's delivered is a bomb meant for a planned terrorist attack on the French capital. Frank must rush to find and stop Gassam (RJ Parrish), the gang leader who'll stop at nothing to avenge his brother, who was accidentally killed during an identity check. After an electric first encounter, Frank can count on Mauga (Athena Karkanis), Gassam's sister, who wants to stop her brother from committing the irreparable while Carla uses her old connections with the French secret service to protect him. The hunt for the bomb begins.
10	10	"The Switch" "Echt Falsch" "Contrefaçon"	Andy Mikita	Joseph Mallozzi & Paul Mullie	25 Oct 2012	27 December 2012	1 Mar 2013	105	3,000,000 (12.9%)
Frank is to pick up a valuable painting from a gallery and bring it to a rich psychopath art collector. There is a wild chase during the transfer and a young woman on a motorcycle threatens him with a gun, claiming that the painting is hers. Fortunately, at this moment the police appears and Frank seizes the opportunity to wriggle out of the situation. But when he delivers the painting to art collector Max Khyber (Hannes Jaenicke), it turns out that it is a fake. Khyber feels betrayed and suspects Frank of stealing the original. He holds Frank prisoner on his property and sends in a dominatrix, Lara, to get him to talk, but Frank manages to free himself and goes in search of the original with the young woman who claims ownership.
11	11	"12 Hours" "Wettlauf Gegen die Zeit" "12 Heures Pour Survivre"	Bruce McDonald & Brad Turner	Carl Binder	N/A	13 December 2012	8 Mar 2013	102	2,060,000 (16.1%)
Frank has twelve hours to transport a stolen microchip, meant for the development of advanced weaponry, before the rigged package kills him. In a race against time, Frank must find a way to force the client to neutralize the deadly device.
12	12	"Cherchez La Femme" "Cherchez la femme" "Double Jeu"	Brad Turner	Steve Lightfoot	20 Dec 2012	10 January 2013	15 Mar 2013	111	2,885,000 (10.9%)
Jet (Chelsea Hobbs), rebellious, young, internationally known and antisocial hacker, is Frank's latest package. He delivers her to a trader who speculated with Mafia money and needs her help to reacquire it in the quickest way possible and get his accounts back in order. However, the Mafia isn't the only party interested in the young lady, as Frank finds out once his mission is accomplished and he's faced with a very difficult decision: find the hacker again or Carla, who's just been kidnapped, will be killed. Carla is kept tied up, with her mouth taped shut, and later she is blindfolded. Frank discovers that the hacker, who's being accused of spying, actually found evidence of corruption in the DCRI with her best friend, who is now dead in their apartment. Frank enlists Tarconi and Juliette to help him save Carla and the young hacker. But with a corrupt Deputy Chief pulling the strings, the DCRI proves itself to be a tough adversary...

=== Season 2 (2014) ===
Season 2 premiered in Canada on The Movie Network and Movie Central on 5 October 2014. Season 2 premiered in the United States on TNT on 29 November 2014.

No. overall	No. in season	Title	Directed by	Written by	Canadian air date	U.S. air date	French air date	Prod. code	Viewers (millions)
13	1	"2B Or Not 2B" "Le Témoin"	Eric Valette	Frank Spotnitz	5 Oct 2014	29 November 2014	1 Jan 2015	201	2.58
Frank must transport as 12-year old boy from Germany to Rome to testify to witnessing his father's murder but the killers are out to stop him. While on their way they were attacked by the brother of the murderer of the boy's father
14	2	"Boom" "La Mine"	Érik Canuel	Ben Harris	5 Oct 2014	13 December 2014	1 Jan 2015	202	1.88
Frank and Cat travel to the Sahara Desert to deliver a briefcase but get caught up in a mine collapse and spring into action to rescue the miners.
15	3	"Beacon of Hope" "L'Ange de Zouerat"	Stefan Pleszczynski	Francesca Gardiner	12 Oct 2014	6 December 2014	15 Jan 2015	203	2.12
Returning to Africa, Frank and Cat go to rescue a relief worker who happens to be Cat's ex-lover.
16	4	"We Go Back" "Retour vers l'Enfer"	Eric Valette	Frank Spotnitz	19 Oct 2014	17 January 2015	22 Jan 2015	204	2.12
Tommy, an old army buddy of Frank's, asks him to go to Libya with him where their mutual comrade, Rob has gotten in hot water while working for MI-6. They believe Rob has been killed but soon are pulled into a battle of two factions for a deadly bio-weapon and discover lots of secrets of their friend.
17	5	"Euphro" "Euphro"	Érik Canuel	Jeffrey Allan Schechter	26 Oct 2014	7 February 2015	5 Feb 2015	205	1.57
Frank must help his sometime ally Inspector Tarconi when the man is set up by fellow cops during a raid on the home of a noted counterfeiter of medical groups. With Tarconi wanted himself, Frank must help him clear his name and stop the counterfeiter from a deadly shipment as well as rescue the captured Jules.
18	6	"Diva" "Diva"	Stefan Pleszczynski	Smita Bhide	2 Nov 2014	20 December 2014	8 Jan 2015	206	1.39
Frank is hired to protect an egotistical singer during a tour of Europe but soon realizes that instead of a mad stalker, she's been targeted by a professional assassin.
19	7	"Sex, Lies and Video Tapes" "Sexe, Mensonge et Vidéo"	Stefan Pleszczynski	Frank Spotnitz	9 Nov 2014	27 December 2014	8 Jan 2015	207	1.42
Frank's original job is to recover a dress being used in a blackmail scheme, but he and Cat get sidetracked into helping a street girl rescue her sister from a prostitution operation.
20	8	"T2" "Duel"	P. J. Pesce	Amira El Nemr & Francesca Gardiner	16 Nov 2014	3 January 2015	15 Jan 2015	208	1.40
Frank is offered the job of stealing a painting containing land deeds from a Russian-controlled home but finds himself in competition with another Transporter for the job. Frank meets Jules for the first time working for rival transporter Olivier Dassin.
21	9	"Trust" "Le Piège"	Eric Valette	Ben Harris	23 Nov 2014	10 January 2015	22 Jan 2015	209	1.24
Nine months after transporting a woman away from her mad stalker, Frank finds himself expertly framed for her supposed murder and must play a deadly game to find the truth and clear his name.
22	10	"Chimera" "Chinatown"	P.J. Pesce	Jeffrey Allan Schechter	30 Nov 2014	24 January 2015	29 Jan 2015	210	1.51
Frank has to go undercover for the FBI as an arms dealer to take on a radical group ready to unleash a deadly virus in the U.S. but a mole inside the FBI could expose him. Jules says this is his "first day" working for Frank. [In the internal timeline of events, this episode comes after episode "T2," and both come before episode "Euphro" which shows Jules already integrated into the Transporter team.]
23	11	"Sixteen Hands" "Triple Galop"	Gregory Lemaire	Smita Bhide	7 Dec 2014	31 January 2015	29 Jan 2015	211	1.44
Frank transports a race horse for the Belmont Stakes and finds himself and the pretty jockey targeted by a rival owner.
24	12	"Endgame" "Fin de Partie"	Eric Valette	Frank Spotnitz & Ben Harris	14 Dec 2014	7 February 2015	5 Feb 2015	212	1.44
Frank and Cat pose as a pair of diamond thieves for a job which leads to Frank reuniting with his old girlfriend Zara. Frank is soon pushed into working for the government on a job but learns all is not as it seems and puts himself and Cat in danger.
