= Transporter 1 =

Transporter-1, or Transporter 1, may refer to:

- Transporter-1, a January 2021 spaceflight launch, that carried a record-setting 143 satellites to orbit on a single rocket
- The Transporter, the first movie in the Transporter franchise, succeeded by three sequels, and a television series
