= François Berléand =

French actor (born 1952)

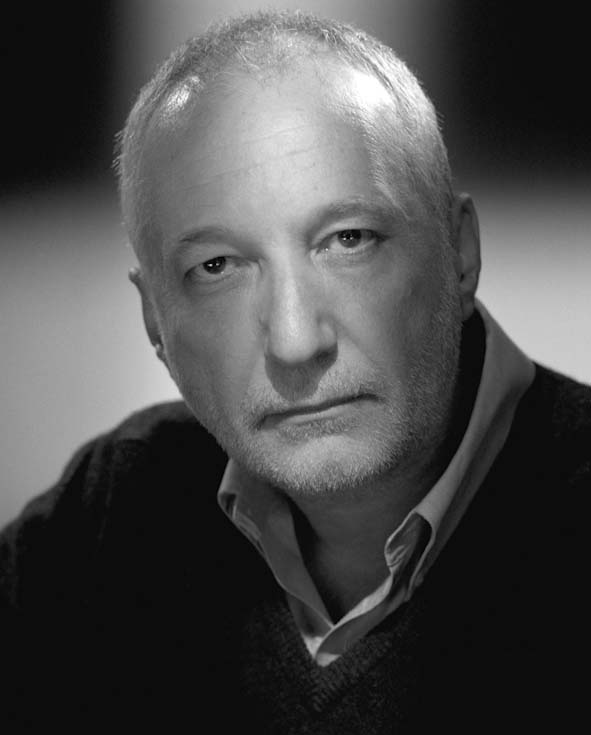
- Born: 22 April 1952 (age 74); Paris, France
- Occupation: Actor
- Years active: 1973–present

François Berléand (French: [fʁɑ̃swa bɛʁleɑ̃]; born 22 April 1952) is a French actor.

He plays Gilles Triquet, the officer manager and equivalent of David Brent in Le Bureau, the French version of The Office, produced by Canal+. He also appeared in the 2002 film The Transporter as the French commissaire named Tarconi, an active and honest police officer who is an acquaintance of Frank Martin (Jason Statham). He reprised the role in the sequels Transporter 2 and Transporter 3 and the TV series.

== Early life ==
Berléand was born in Paris, France. The son of a Russian-Armenian father and a French mother, until the age of eleven he found his childhood traumatic after being told by his father that Berléand was the son of the Invisible Man.

== Career ==
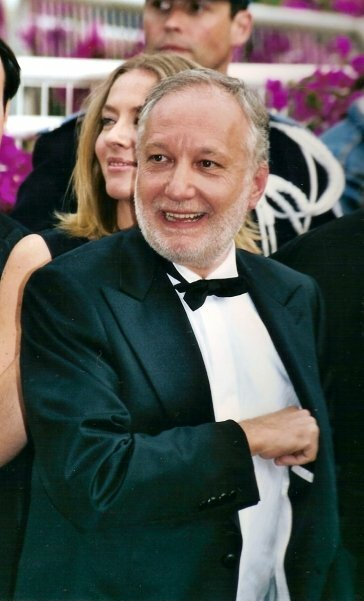
Berléand at the 2004 Cannes Film Festival

While studying at business school, he trained as an actor, somewhat against his will; his first stage role was in a play called Sur une plage de l'Ouest (On a beach in the West). After graduation, he enrolled in drama classes with Tania Balachova and then met Daniel, a director under whose auspices he worked from 1974 to 1981, participating in a dozen productions, mainly of contemporary classics.

Berléand began his film career in 1978 with supporting roles in successful comedies throughout the 1980s. After a series of highly acclaimed supporting roles, including My Small Business for which he won the César for best actor in a supporting role in 2000, he won his first major role in the film My Idol by Guillaume Canet which brought his name and face to the wider public. For this, Berléand thanks his former girlfriend, actress-director Nicole Garcia.

In Martin et Léa, he plays a police inspector, a role he went on to perform many times on screen (La Balance, Les mois d'avril sont meurtriers (based on the novel The Devil's Home on Leave by Derek Raymond), Marche à l'ombre (Walking in the Shade), The Bait, The Death the Chinese, Fred, The Smile of the Clown, Ne le dis à personne (Tell No One), Transporter 1, 2, and 3) thanks in part to a cold, distant, and piercing gaze. Berléand often plays military characters (The Hostage of Europe, Stella, Les Milles, Captain Conan, The Prince of the Pacific); he has also played a detective (Follow This Plane), pastor (Au revoir les enfants) and psychiatrist in Seventh Heaven, the film that really showed his talents to the public in late 1997.

He released a book about his childhood in 2006, Le fils de l'homme invisible (The son of the invisible man).

== Personal life ==
Berléand was in a relationship with French actress, film director and screenwriter Nicole Garcia for twelve years.

He has been in a long-term relationship with Alexia Stresi; their twins Adèle and Lucy were born in December 2008.

He is also the father of two grown children, Martin (born 1978) and Fanny (born 1983). He is the grandfather of Elios (born 2013), son of Martin.

== Theater ==
Year	Title	Author	Director	Notes
1973	Le Champion de la faim	Franz Kafka	Daniel Benoin	
1973	Les Corbeaux	Henry Becque	Daniel Benoin	
1974	Deutsches Requiem	Pierre Bourgeade	Daniel Benoin	
1974	Monsieur de Pourceaugnac	Molière	Daniel Benoin	
1975	Woyzeck	Georg Büchner	Daniel Benoin	
1977	The Bald Soprano	Eugène Ionesco	Daniel Benoin	
1979	Hide your happiness!	Jean-Patrick Manchette	Daniel Benoin	
1985	Hernani	Victor Hugo	Antoine Vitez	
1986	Madame de Sade	Yukio Mishima	Sophie Loucachevsky	
1987	Les Désossés	Louis-Charles Sirjacq	Sophie Loucachevsky	
1987	Mort de Judas/Le Point de vue de Ponce Pilate	Paul Claudel	Sophie Loucachevsky	
1990	La Dame de chez Maxim	Georges Feydeau	Alain Françon	
1990	Partage de midi	Paul Claudel	Brigitte Jaques-Wajeman	
1994	The Homecoming	Harold Pinter	Bernard Murat	
1999	Biographie : un jeu	Max Frisch	Frédéric Bélier-Garcia	
2002	L'Enfant do	Jean-Claude Grumberg	Jean-Michel Ribes	
2003	Chinese Coffee	Ira Lewis	Richard Berry	
2007	L’Arbre de joie	Louis-Michel Colla & David Khayat	Christophe Lidon	
2007	Faisons un rêve	Sacha Guitry	Bernard Murat	
2008	Batailles	Roland Topor & Jean-Michel Ribes	Jean-Michel Ribes	
2008	Tailleur pour dames	Georges Feydeau	Bernard Murat	
2009	Sentiments provisoires	Gérald Aubert	Bernard Murat	
2011–2013	Quadrille	Sacha Guitry	Bernard Murat	
2012	Le Dindon	Georges Feydeau	Bernard Murat	
2012	Bons baisers de Manault	Manault Deva	Manault Deva	
2013–2015	Nina	André Roussin	Bernard Murat	
2014–2015	Deux hommes tout nus	Sébastien Thiéry	Ladislas Chollat	Nominated - Molière Award for Best Actor
2015–2016	Momo	Sébastien Thiéry	Ladislas Chollat	
2016	Du vent dans les branches de sassafras	René de Obaldia	Bernard Murat	
2016	Moi, moi et François B.	Clément Gayet	Stéphane Hillel	
2017	Ramses II	Sébastien Thiéry	Stéphane Hillel	
2019	Encore un instant	Fabrice Roger-Lacan	Bernard Murat	

== Filmography ==
Year	Title	Role	Director	Notes
1977	Au plaisir de Dieu	A guest	Robert Mazoyer	TV mini-series
1979	Martin et Léa	The inspector	Alain Cavalier	
1979	Hamlet	Reynado / Osric / Mercellus	Renaud Saint-Pierre	TV movie
1980	La cantatrice chauve	M. Smith	Alexandre Tarta	TV movie
1981	Les hommes préfèrent les grosses	Julien	Jean-Marie Poiré	
1981	Un étrange voyage	The rogue witness	Alain Cavalier	
1981	On n'est pas des anges... elles non plus	The second jogger	Michel Lang	
1982	La Balance	Inspector de la Mondaine	Bob Swaim	
1982	Messieurs les jurés	Jean-Yves Oroër	Jean-Marie Coldefy	TV series (1 episode)
1983	Stella	Captain at the hangar	Laurent Heynemann	
1983	Elle voulait faire du cinéma	Pierre	Caroline Huppert	TV movie
1984	Marche à l'ombre	Police Inspector	Michel Blanc	
1984	Ote-toi de mon soleil	Socrate	Marc Jolivet	
1985	Sincerely Charlotte	The officer PTT	Caroline Huppert	
1985	Strictement personnel	Gérard	Pierre Jolivet	
1985	Série noire	Dalbois	Laurent Heynemann	TV series (1 episode)
1986	Le complexe du kangourou	Loïc's Stepbrother	Pierre Jolivet	
1986	La femme secrète	Zaccharia Pasdeloup	Sébastien Grall	
1987	Goodbye, Children	Father Michel	Louis Malle	
1987	Poker	The counsel	Catherine Corsini	
1987	Les mois d'avril sont meurtriers	Baumann	Laurent Heynemann	
1988	Camille Claudel	Doctor Michaux	Bruno Nuytten	
1988	Jours de vagues	Benjamin	Alain Tasma	Short
1989	The Hostage of Europe	General Montholon	Jerzy Kawalerowicz	
1989	L'Orchestre rouge	Corbin	Jacques Rouffio	
1989	Un père et passe	Maxence	Sébastien Grall	
1989	Suivez cet avion	Combette	Patrice Ambard	
1989	Ceux de la soif	M. Carmat	Laurent Heynemann	TV movie
1989	Série noire	Sylvain	Laurent Heynemann	TV series (1 episode)
1990	May Fools	Daniel	Louis Malle	
1990	Sans rires	Roger	Mathieu Amalric	Short
1990	La belle Anglaise	The tax Inspector	Jacques Besnard	TV series (1 episode)
1991	C'est quoi ce petit boulot ?	Paul	Gian Luigi Polidoro & Michel Berny	TV mini-series
1992	List of Merite	Alain Denizet	Charles Nemes	
1992	La femme de l'amant	Marc	Christopher Frank	TV movie
1992	Feu Adrien Muset	Edgar	Jacques Besnard	TV movie
1992	La place du père	The lawyer	Laurent Heynemann	TV movie
1993	À l'heure où les grands fauves vont boire	The cousin	Pierre Jolivet	
1993	La vis	The seller	Didier Flamand	Short
1993	Le bal	Georges	Jean-Louis Benoît	TV movie
1993	La porte du ciel	Henri de Lombard	Denys Granier-Deferre	TV movie
1993	Julie Lescaut	C. Béchard	Caroline Huppert	TV series (1 episode)
1994	The Violin Player	Charles	Charles Van Damme	
1994	Le bateau de mariage	The mayor	Jean-Pierre Améris	
1994	Pas si grand que ça !	Ferdinand	Bruno Herbulot	TV movie
1994	Avanti	Leroy-Massard	Jacques Besnard	TV movie
1995	The Bait	Inspector Durieux	Bertrand Tavernier	
1995	Les Milles	Lieutenant Boisset	Sébastien Grall	
1995	Fugueuses	Nicolas	Nadine Trintignant	
1995	La fidèle infidèle	Robert	Jean-Louis Benoît	TV movie
1995	Une page d'amour	Monsieur Rambaud	Serge Moati	TV movie
1995	Un si joli bouquet	Antoine	Jean-Claude Sussfeld	TV movie
1995	3000 scénarios contre un virus	The pharmacist	Cédric Klapisch	TV series (1 episode)
1996	A Self Made Hero	Monsieur Jo	Jacques Audiard	
1996	Captain Conan	Commandant Bouvier	Bertrand Tavernier	
1996	Gorille, mon ami	Michel	Emmanuel Malherbe	Short
1996	Tous les hommes sont menteurs	Lionel	Alain Wermus	TV movie
1996	J'ai rendez-vous avec vous	Serge	Laurent Heynemann	TV movie
1996	Le juge est une femme	Guy Lesueur	Pierre Boutron	TV series (1 episode)
1996	Les Cordier, juge et flic	Lansac	Bruno Herbulot	TV series (1 episode)
1996	Anne Le Guen	The prefect	Stéphane Kurc	TV series (1 episode)
1997	Seventh Heaven	The doctor	Benoît Jacquot	
1997	The Bet	Doctor Bricourt	Didier Bourdon & Bernard Campan	
1997	L'Homme idéal	The Balto's man	Xavier Gélin	
1997	Fred	Barrère	Pierre Jolivet	
1997	Tout le monde descend	Jean-Pierre	Laurent Bachet	Short
1997	Bonjour	Joseph	Bruno Herbulot	Short
1997	Pardaillan	Henry de Montmorency	Édouard Niermans	TV movie
1997	La parenthèse	Philippe	Jean-Louis Benoît	TV movie
1997	Un homme	Marcel	Robert Mazoyer	TV movie
1997	Le garçon d'orage	The lame	Jérôme Foulon	TV movie
1997	Madame le consul	Ambassador Delaunay	Bertrand Van Effenterre & Joyce Buñuel	TV series (2 episodes)
1998	The School of Flesh	Soukaz	Benoît Jacquot	
1998	Place Vendôme	Eric Malivert	Nicole Garcia	
1998	La mort du chinois	Inspector Chevalot	Jean-Louis Benoît	
1998	En plein coeur	Antoine	Pierre Jolivet	
1998	Dormez, je le veux !	Paul / Raymond	Irène Jouannet	
1998	Un flic presque parfait	Génaro	Marc Angelo	TV movie
1998	La grande Béké	Raymond	Alain Maline	TV movie
1998	Crimes en série	Jean Brunet	Patrick Dewolf	TV series (1 episode)
1998	Commandant Nerval	Gabriel Cheminal	Arnaud Sélignac	TV series (1 episode)
1999	My Little Business	Maxime Nassieff	Pierre Jolivet	César Award for Best Supporting Actor
1999	Romance	Robert	Catherine Breillat	
1999	Bad Company	René	Jean-Pierre Améris	
1999	One 4 All	Unpleasant passenger	Claude Lelouch	
1999	Innocent	Jean-René	Costa Natsis	
1999	Le plus beau pays du monde	Brafort	Marcel Bluwal	
1999	La débandade	Doctor Nataf	Claude Berri	
1999	Le sourire du clown	Drouot	Éric Besnard	
1999	L'homme de ma vie	Frydman	Stéphane Kurc	
1999	Fleurs de sel	Edouard de Renoncourt	Arnaud Sélignac	TV movie
1999	Le boiteux	Granier	Paule Zajdermann	TV series (1 episode)
2000	Actors	François Nègre	Bertrand Blier	
2000	Stardom	Nigel Pope's associate	Denys Arcand	
2000	Deep in the Woods	Axel de Fersen	Lionel Delplanque	
2000	Six-Pack	Thomas	Alain Berbérian	
2000	Le prince du Pacifique	Commandant Lefèvre	Alain Corneau	
2000	Grand oral	President of the jury	Yann Moix	Short
2000	Trait d'union	Monsieur Théo	Bruno Garcia	Short
2000	Liste rouge	The taxi driver	Jérôme Bonnell	Short
2000	Un morceau de soleil	Louis	Dominique Cheminal	TV movie
2000	Ces forces obscures qui nous gouvernent	Professor William Guety	Olivier Doran	TV movie
2000	Victoire, ou la douleur des femmes	Doctor Treves	Nadine Trintignant	TV mini-series
2000	Passeur d'enfants	Jean	Franck Apprederis	TV series (1 episode)
2001	How I Killed My Father	The patient	Anne Fontaine	
2001	HS - hors service	Louis	Jean-Paul Lilienfeld	
2001	La fille de son père	Henri	Jacques Deschamps	
2001	Les âmes câlines	Jacques	Thomas Bardinet	
2001	Cyrano	The father	Vincent Lindon	Short
2001	Requiem(s)	The man with the gun	Stéphan Guérin-Tillié	Short
2001	Recrutement	Corbi	Didier Lauret	Short
2002	Whatever You Say	Jean-Louis Broustal	Guillaume Canet	Étoiles d'Or for Best Actor; Nominated – César Award for Best Actor
2002	The Adversary	Rémi	Nicole Garcia	
2002	The Transporter	Inspector Tarconi	Corey Yuen & Louis Leterrier	
2002	The Code	The man in contract with Yanis	Manuel Boursinhac	
2002	Le frère du guerrier	The priest	Pierre Jolivet	
2002	Féroce	Police Inspector	Gilles de Maistre	
2002	Vivante	The father	Sandrine Ray	
2002	Une employée modèle	François Maurey	Jacques Otmezguine	
2002	Il giovane Casanova	Louis XV	Giacomo Battiato	TV movie
2002	L'héritière	Bordier	Bernard Rapp	TV movie
2003	Sole Sisters	Mermot	Pierre Jolivet	
2003	Remake	Francois-Charles Leconte	Dino Mustafić	
2003	En territoire indien	Jean-Claude Adam	Lionel Epp	
2003	Les amateurs	Monsieur Meinau	Martin Valente	
2003	La chaîne du froid	The client	Hervé Lavayssière	Short
2003	Les parents terribles	Georges	Josée Dayan	TV movie
2004	The Chorus	Rachin	Christophe Barratier	Nominated – César Award for Best Supporting Actor
2004	Cash Truck	Bernard	Nicolas Boukhrief	
2004	Me and My Sister	Pierre Demouthy	Alexandra Leclère	
2004	Narco	Guy Bennet	Gilles Lellouche & Tristan Aurouet	
2004	Le grand rôle	Benny Schwarz	Steve Suissa	
2004	Pour le plaisir	François	Dominique Deruddere	
2004	Eros thérapie	Adam Corbeau	Danièle Dubroux	
2004	Une vie à t'attendre	Simon	Thierry Klifa	
2004	Le plus beau jour de ma vie	Valentin	Julie Lipinski	
2004	Toi, vieux	The visitor from the future	Pierre Coré & Michaël Mitz	Short
2005	Transporter 2	Inspector Tarconi	Louis Leterrier	
2005	Quartier V.I.P.	Bertrand Fussac	Laurent Firode	
2005	Edy	Edy Saïovici	Stéphan Guérin-Tillié	
2006	Comedy of Power	Michel Humeau	Claude Chabrol	
2006	Tell No One	Eric Levkowitch	Guillaume Canet	
2006	Aurore	The King	Nils Tavernier	
2006	Le passager de l'été	Maurice Lecouvey	Florence Moncorgé-Gabin	
2006	Le Bureau	Gilles Triquet	Nicolas & Bruno	TV mini-series
2007	Could This Be Love?	Roland Christin	Pierre Jolivet	
2007	A Girl Cut in Two	Charles Saint-Denis	Claude Chabrol	
2007	Pur week-end	Commandant Papan	Olivier Doran	
2007	Fragile(s)	Paul	Martin Valente	
2007	Faisons un rêve	The husband	Bernard Murat	TV movie
2008	Transporter 3	Inspector Tarconi	Olivier Megaton	
2008	Ca$h	François	Éric Besnard	
2008	15 ans et demi	Albert Einstein	François Desagnat & Thomas Sorriaux	
2008	Tailleur pour dames	Bassinet	Bernard Murat	TV movie
2008	Le gendre idéal	Max	Arnaud Sélignac	TV movie
2008	Chez Maupassant	Prosper Chicot	Claude Chabrol	TV series (1 episode)
2009	Le Concert	Olivier Morne Duplessis	Radu Mihăileanu	
2009	Le siffleur	Armand / Maurice Teillard	Philippe Lefebvre	
2009	La différence, c'est que c'est pas pareil	Sylvain	Pascal Laëthier	
2009	L'évasion	Colonel Von Deck	Laurence Katrian	TV movie
2009	Les associés	Raymond Rosen	Alain Berliner	TV movie
2010	Vieilles canailles	J.P.	Arnaud Sélignac	TV movie
2010	Le pot de colle	Richard Maurand	Julien Seri	TV movie
2010	Le gendre idéal 2	Max	Arnaud Sélignac	TV movie
2010	Le grand restaurant	A client	Gérard Pullicino	TV movie
2010	Main basse sur une île	The Angel	Antoine Santana	TV movie
2011	Au bistro du coin	François	Charles Nemes	
2011	Escalade	Noé	Charlotte Silvera	
2011	Une vie de chien	Monsieur Schartz	Cyril Ethan Robert	Short
2011	Insoupçonnable	Pierre Jourdan	Benoît d'Aubert	TV movie
2012	Happiness Never Comes Alone	Alain Posche	James Huth	
2012	Another Woman's Life	Lawyer Volin	Sylvie Testud	
2012	Dead Man Talking	Karl Raven	Patrick Ridremont	
2012	The Stroller Strategy	Jean-Luc Hamory	Clément Michel	
2012	Un jour mon père viendra	Bernard Bleu	Martin Valente	
2012	Max	Police Inspector	Stéphanie Murat	
2012	La certosa di Parma	Prince of Parme	Cinzia Th. Torrini	TV movie
2012–2014	Transporter: The Series	Inspector Tarconi	Brad Turner, Andy Mikita, ...	TV series (14 episodes)
2013	12 ans d'âge	Charles	Frédéric Proust	
2013	Blanche nuit	La Malice	Fabrice Sébille	
2013	Crime d'État	Robert Boulin	Pierre Aknine	TV movie
2013	Surveillance	JC Dedieu	Sébastien Grall	TV movie
2014	Palais de justesse	The President	Stéphane De Groodt	Short
2014	La clef des champs	Fred	Bertrand Van Effenterre	TV movie
2015	Entre amis	Philippe	Olivier Baroux	
2015	The Art Dealer	Simon	François Margolin	
2015	Vicky	Albert Bonhomme	Denis Imbert	
2015	Call My Agent !	Himself	Lola Doillon	TV series (1 episode)
2015	Peplum	Senator	Philippe Lefebvre	TV series (1 episode)
2016	La main du mal	Lucien Smadja	Pierre Aknine	TV series (2 episodes)
2017	L'école buissonnière	Count of Fresnaye	Nicolas Vanier	
2017	I Feel Better	Audibert	Jean-Pierre Améris	
2017	C'est tout pour moi	Fabrice	Ludovic Colbeau-Justin & Nawell Madani	
2017–2018	Les Chamois	Étienne Leroy	Philippe Lefebvre	TV series (12 episodes)
2018	La Ch'tite famille	Alexander	Dany Boon	
2019	L'esprit de famille	Jacques	Éric Besnard	Post-production
2019	La vérité si je mens ! Les débuts		Gérard Bitton & Michel Munz	Post-production
2019	Someone, Somewhere (Deux moi)	J.B. Meyer	Cédric Klapisch	
