= Yu Wenxia =

Chinese actress, singer, presenter, and beauty queen

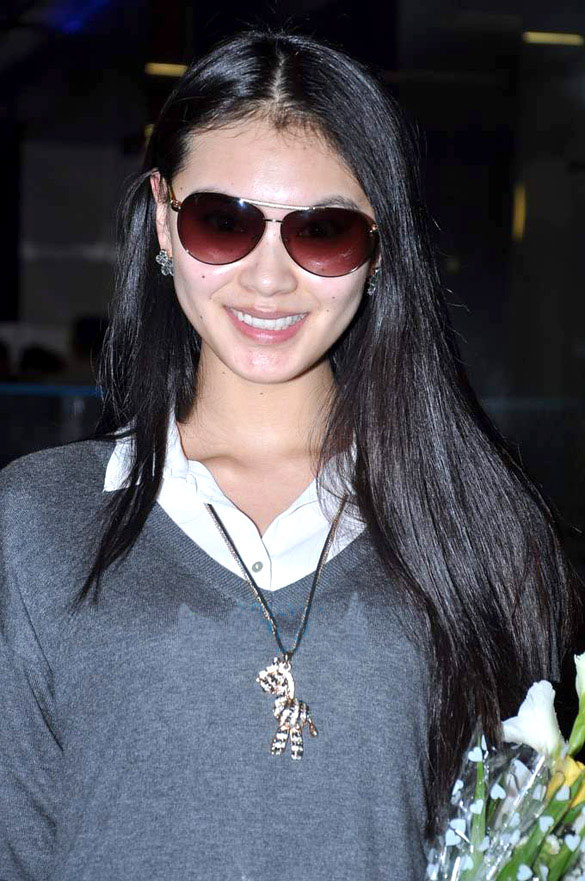
- Wenxia at Mumbai Airport
- Born: 5 July 1989 (age 37); Shangzhi, Heilongjiang, China
- Height: 170 cm (5 ft 7 in)
- Beauty pageant titleholder
- Title: Miss World China 2012
- Hair color: Black
- Eye color: Brown
- Major competitions: Miss World China 2012 (Winner); Miss World 2012 (Winner)

Yu Wenxia (Chinese: 于文霞; pinyin: Yú Wénxiá; born 5 July 1989) is a Chinese actress, TV host, singer, model and beauty queen who won Miss World 2012 in Ordos City, Inner Mongolia, the second Chinese national to do so after Zhang Zilin in 2007.

== Early life and education ==
The second of two daughters to farming parents, she was born on 5 July 1989 in Shangzhi, Heilongjiang in northeast China. She completed a four-year university course in Chinese Folk Music at Harbin University. She is currently studying at Harvard University in the United States.

== Career ==
=== Miss China 2012 ===
On 30 June 2012, Yu was crowned Miss China 2012 at the Jinhai Lake Resort in Beijing.

=== Miss World 2012 ===
On 18 August 2012, Yu won the 2012 Miss World pageant held in Dongsheng Fitness Center Stadium, Ordos City, Inner Mongolia, China. She was also named Miss Talent, where she performed her winning talent—Chinese folk song on stage during the final. She captured the second crown of China, some 5 years after Zhang Zilin won the first crown in 2007.

When asked how she felt at winning the Miss World crown, she replied:

Surprised and very happy. Winning Miss World is a big responsibility; there is so much to learn. I really admire Zhang Zilin, my country's first Miss World winner, I hope to follow her example, but at the same time make my own mark. I very much look forward to working with the Miss World Organisation sharing my compassion and love and helping to improve the lives of many people throughout my year of reign.

During her reign as Miss World, Yu traveled to the United Kingdom, Italy, France, South Africa, India, Australia, Philippines, Thailand, Indonesia, Russia, United States, Haiti, Brazil, Turkey, Ghana, Hungary, Ukraine and China.

=== Miss World 2013 ===
On the grand final of Miss World 2013, Yu performed "Tanzette" along with the Talent competition winner and runner-up, Vania Larissa from Indonesia and Erin Holland from Australia. She eventually crowned Megan Young of the Philippines, as her successor in Miss World 2013.

== Filmography ==
Year	Title	Role	Director	Notes
2015	The Transporter Refueled	Qiao	Camille Delamarre	

== Notes and references ==
Awards and achievements
Preceded by (Venezuela) Ivian Sarcos	Miss World; 2012	Succeeded by (Philippines) Megan Young
Preceded by (Philippines) Gwendoline Ruais	Miss World Asia & Oceania; 2012	Succeeded by (Philippines) Megan Young
Preceded by (Chile) Gabriela Pulgar	Miss World Talent; 2012	Succeeded by (Indonesia) Vania Larissa
Preceded by Liu Chen	Miss World China; 2012	Succeeded by Yu Weiwei
