= Third Person (film) =

- Theatrical release poster
- Directed by: Paul Haggis
- Written by: Paul Haggis
- Produced by: Paul Breuls; Michael Nozik; Paul Haggis
- Starring: Liam Neeson; Mila Kunis; Adrien Brody; Olivia Wilde; James Franco; Moran Atias; Maria Bello; Kim Basinger
- Cinematography: Gianfilippo Corticelli
- Edited by: Jo Francis
- Music by: Dario Marianelli
- Production companies: Corsan; Highway 61 Films; Volten; Lailaps Pictures; Filmfinance XII
- Distributed by: Sony Pictures Classics (United States, United Kingdom, Germany and Scandinavia); Belga Films (Belgium)
- Release dates: 9 September 2013 (TIFF); 20 June 2014 (United States, limited)
- Running time: 137 minutes
- Countries: United Kingdom; United States; Germany; Belgium
- Language: English
- Box office: $2.6 million

Third Person is a 2013 romantic drama film directed and written by Paul Haggis and starring an ensemble cast consisting of Liam Neeson, Mila Kunis, Adrien Brody, Olivia Wilde, James Franco, Moran Atias, Kim Basinger, Loan Chabanol and Maria Bello. The film premiered at the 2013 Toronto International Film Festival on 9 September 2013 before having a limited release in the United States on 20 June 2014, grossing $2.6 million and receiving negative reviews from critics.

== Plot ==
The film tells three inter-connected love stories that take place in Paris, New York, and Italy (Rome and Taranto). It will emerge that most of the characters and storylines are imagined by Michael, who is writing a novel while grieving the death of his son.

Paris: Michael, a writer who recently left his wife Elaine, receives a visit from his lover Anna. The story explores their very complicated on/off relationship due to her inability to commit because of a terrible secret. It will emerge that Anna is a character in Michael's novel, and that he is using their imagined relationship to deal with the death of his son.

New York: Julia, an ex-soap opera actress turned hotel maid is accused of harming her young son, a charge which she firmly denies. As a result of these charges, he is now in the custody of her ex-husband Rick who is trying everything in his power to take the boy away from her. Meanwhile, she is trying at all costs to regain custody of her son.

Rome and Taranto: Scott, an American businessman on a trip to Italy, falls in love with a Romani woman, Monika. Scott is inevitably drawn into a plot where he tries to free Monika's daughter who has been kidnapped by an Italian gangster in Taranto city and is being held for ransom. Emotions run high as the viewer and Scott question whether this is a setup or not.

== Cast ==
- Liam Neeson as Michael Leary
- Olivia Wilde as Anna Barr
- James Franco as Rick Weiss
- Mila Kunis as Julia Weiss
- Adrien Brody as Scott Lowry
- Moran Atias as Monika
- Maria Bello as Theresa Lowry
- Kim Basinger as Elaine Leary
- Caroline Goodall as Dr. Gertner
- David Harewood as Jake Long
- Riccardo Scamarcio as Marco
- Loan Chabanol as Sam
- Patrick Duggan as NYC Hotel Bell Man

== Release ==
The first international trailer of the film was released on 15 April 2014, followed by a domestic poster the following day. The first US trailer was released on 18 April. The film was released in the United States on 20 June 2014.

== Reception ==
=== Box office ===
Third Person had a limited release on June 20, 2014, and grossed $1,021,398 in the United States and Canada and $1,603,363 in other territories with a total of $2,624,761 worldwide.

=== Critical response ===
Third Person received negative reviews from critics. The film has a 26% approval rating on the review aggregator website Rotten Tomatoes, based on 105 reviews with an average rating of 4.50/10, with the consensus: "Third Person finds writer-director Paul Haggis working with a stellar cast and a worthy premise; unfortunately, he fails to fashion a consistently compelling movie out of the intriguing ingredients at his disposal." Metacritic gave the film a rating of 38/100, based on 33 reviews.

== Home media ==
The film was released on DVD and Blu-ray Disc on 30 September 2014.
