= St Bede's Catholic College =

Location
- Long Cross; Bristol, BS11 0SU; England
- Coordinates: 51.505163°N 2.65646°W

Information
- Type: Secondary Academy
- Motto: In novitiate vitae
- Religious affiliation: Roman Catholic
- Established: 2011
- Department for Education URN: 137627 Tables
- Ofsted: Reports
- Principal: Robert King
- Gender: Mixed
- Age: 11 to 18
- Enrolment: 1039
- Capacity: 1042
- Houses: Bell Burnell, Descartes, Pasteur and Seacole
- Colours: Red, Blue, Green and Yellow
- Website: http://www.stbedescc.org/

St Bede's Catholic College is a secondary school located in Lawrence Weston, Bristol, England. Since November 2011 it has been an Academy. The school also received a rating of Good during an Ofsted inspection in October 2021.

St Bede's takes students from Weston-super-Mare, Clevedon, Nailsea, Central Bristol, Bristol's outer suburbs, and most of South Gloucestershire. It has a strong partnership with St Brendan's Sixth Form College in Brislington.

The school was awarded a green flag in the Eco School Awards in July 2004.

Improvements include ICT rooms built in 2004 and the lecture theatre in 2005. Also, more recently, a large block of specialist Art, Food and Design and Technology classrooms were built by Skanska in 2009.

As of 4 July 2012, St. Bede's were granted planning permission to build a Sixth Form building. The project was successfully completed in 2015.

In July 2017 Principal Catherine Hughes announced that she was retiring after 22 years of service to the college. The principal as of 2026 is Robert King.

== Notable former pupils ==
- Mike Barrett, professional footballer.
- Chris Vance, professional actor.
- Diane Youdale, Jet from Gladiators.
