= 15 ans et demi =

- Film poster
- Directed by: François Desagnat; Thomas Sorriaux
- Written by: Vincent Ravalec; François Desagnat; Thomas Sorriaux; Romain Protat
- Produced by: Patrice Ledoux; Luc Bossi
- Starring: Daniel Auteuil; Juliette Lamboley
- Cinematography: Vincent Mathias
- Edited by: Christine Lucas Navarro
- Music by: Alexandre Azaria
- Distributed by: Gaumont
- Release date: 30 April 2008
- Running time: 97 minutes
- Country: France
- Language: French
- Budget: $9.5 million
- Box office: $4.3 million

15 ans et demi (lit. '15 years and a half', also known as Daddy Cool) is a 2008 French comedy film by François Desagnat and Thomas Sorriaux, starring Daniel Auteuil.

== Plot summary ==
Philippe Le Tallec, an eminent scientist, has been living in the United States for several years. He returns to France to take care of his teenage daughter and hopes to make up for the lost years with her but Églantine is not interested and has far more important teenage preoccupations. Completely out of his depth, Philippe resolves to study fatherhood with the help of Jean-Maxence, a famous author of methods of fatherhood, with interventions from Einstein.

== Cast ==
- Daniel Auteuil : Philippe Le Tallec
- Juliette Lamboley : Églantine Le Tallec, Philippe's daughter
- François Damiens : Jean-Maxence
- Lionel Abelanski : Guy, a friend of Philippe
- Julie Ferrier : Fiona
- François Berléand : Albert Einstein
- Elise Larnicol : Sylvie
- Benjamin Siksou : Gaspard
- Lucie Lucas : Karine
- Philippe Duquesne : Jean-Louis
- Chick Ortega : Denis
- Alain Chabat : Norbert
- Sara Mortensen : Barbara, bald laboratory guinea-pig
- Coura Traoré : Anne-Sophie
- Canis Crevillen : Charlotte
- Lionel Lingelser : Vincent
- Maud Verdeyen : Zoé
- Dylan Imayanga : Enzo
- César Domboy : Achille
- Edwin Apps : A scientist
- Elie Semoun : The vindictive motorist
- Vincent Desagnat : Radio voice

== Background ==
The film is based on two works by the screenwriter and director Vincent Ravalec « Ma fille a quatorze ans » and « Papa zéro défaut », the latter including the elements of the father attending a re-education course. The shooting took ten weeks, of which Auteuil was available for only eight.

== Critical reception ==
French reviewers considered the film a creditable French attempt at an American-style teen movie, derivative but entertaining on its own terms.

== Reviews ==
- Isabelle Regnier, "15 ans et demi" : un teen movie à la française, Le Monde, 29 April 2008.
- 15 Ans et Demi, Premiere, 30 April 2008.
