= Transporter 2 =

2005 film by Louis Leterrier

- Theatrical release poster
- Directed by: Louis Leterrier
- Written by: Luc Besson; Robert Mark Kamen
- Based on: Characters by Luc Besson; Robert Mark Kamen
- Produced by: Luc Besson; Steve Chasman
- Starring: Jason Statham; Alessandro Gassmann; Amber Valletta; Kate Nauta; François Berléand; Keith David; Hunter Clary; Shannon Briggs; Matthew Modine; Jason Flemyng
- Cinematography: Mitchell Amundsen
- Edited by: Christine Lucas-Navarro; Vincent Tabaillon
- Music by: Alexandre Azaria
- Production companies: EuropaCorp; TF1 Films Production; Current Entertainment; Canal+; TPS Star
- Distributed by: EuropaCorp Distribution (France); 20th Century Fox (Worldwide)
- Release dates: 3 August 2005 (France); 2 September 2005 (United States)
- Running time: 87 minutes
- Country: France
- Language: English
- Budget: $32 million
- Box office: $89.1 million

Transporter 2 (French: Le Transporteur 2) is a 2005 English-language French action film directed by Louis Leterrier and written by Luc Besson & Robert Mark Kamen. It is the sequel to The Transporter (2002) and the second installment in the Transporter film series, followed by Transporter 3 (2008) and The Transporter Refueled. It stars Jason Statham as Frank Martin, with Alessandro Gassmann, Amber Valletta, Kate Nauta, François Berléand, Matthew Modine, and Jason Flemyng. In the film, Frank Martin (Statham) is tasked with protecting the young son of politician Jefferson Billings (Modine) from an international drugs cartel.

Transporter 2 was theatrically released in France on August 3, 2005, by EuropaCorp, and was released in the United States on September 2, 2005, by 20th Century Fox. It received mixed reviews from critics with praise for Statham's performance, action sequences and direction, but criticism for its screenwriting. It grossed $89.1 million worldwide and was followed by the sequel Transporter 3 (2008).

== Plot ==
Frank Martin has relocated from southern France to Miami, Florida, where, as a favor to a friend, he becomes the temporary chauffeur for wealthy Audrey and Jefferson Billings. Frank bonds with their son Jack, picking him up from elementary school after subduing a gang of carjackers who try to steal his new Audi A8 W12. Preparing for a visit from his friend Inspector Tarconi, Frank rebuffs the drunken advances of Audrey, whose marriage has become strained.

When Frank takes Jack for a medical checkup, he realizes that impostors have killed the real doctor and receptionist. A lengthy fight erupts with the imposters, led by the trigger-happy Lola, but Frank escapes with Jack. Returning to the Billings' house, Frank receives a phone call explaining that he and Jack are in the sights of a sniper capable of penetrating the car's bulletproof glass. Forced at gunpoint to let Lola in the car and evade the police, Frank is taken to Gianni Chellini, the operation's ringleader, who demands a $5 million ransom from the Billings. The kidnappers leave with Jack, while Frank succeeds in removing an explosive from his car a split-second before detonation.

Assuring Audrey of his innocence, Frank recovers a syringe left by the kidnappers at the doctor's office, while Jack is found seemingly unharmed. With Tarconi's help, Frank tracks down one of the kidnappers, Dimitri, and pretends to inject him with the syringe. He follows Dimitri to a makeshift lab, where he fights off another henchman and discovers the kidnappers have manufactured a deadly and highly contagious virus; Jack has been infected, passing the virus to his parents. Frank is forced to kill Dimitri, while Chellini's scientist hurls the antidote out of the window. Retrieving one dose intact, Frank sneaks into the Billings' home, warning Audrey and using the antidote on Jack.

Jefferson, head of the Office of National Drug Control Policy, addresses a conference of heads of anti-drug organizations from around the world, unknowingly infecting them all. Frank races to Chellini's home, defeating his henchmen but discovering that Chellini has injected himself with the remaining supply of antidote. Chellini explains that the Colombian drug cartels hired him to eliminate their enemies, and that Frank cannot kill him and risk losing the antidote. Chellini leaves Lola to deal with Frank, who fatally impales her on a wine rack.

Chellini escapes by helicopter to a waiting jet to Colombia, while Frank steals his Lamborghini Murcielago Roadster and speeds to the airport, climbing into the jet's nose gear as it takes off. Killing the co-pilot, Frank confronts Chellini, who holds him at gunpoint. In the ensuing scuffle, the pilot is killed and the plane crash-lands in the ocean. Frank incapacitates Chellini while preserving the antidote in his bloodstream, pulling them out of the sinking plane as the police arrive.

At the hospital, the Billings are given the antidote and Jack has made a full recovery. After visiting the Billings in the hospital along with Jack, Frank drives Tarconi to the airport. Having dropped off Tarconi at the airport, Frank receives an unexpected call from someone who is looking for a transporter, to which he responds: "I'm listening".

== Cast ==
- Jason Statham as Frank Martin
- Alessandro Gassmann as Gianni Chellini
- Amber Valletta as Audrey Billings
- Kate Nauta as Lola
- Matthew Modine as Senator Jefferson Billings
- Jason Flemyng as Dimitri
- Keith David as U.S. Marshal Stappleton
- Hunter Clary as Jack Billings
- Shannon Briggs as Max
- François Berléand as Inspector Tarconi
- Jeff Chase as Vasily
- AnnaLynne McCord as Car Jacker Girl
- Tim Ware as U.S. Marshal Hoffman
- Marc Macaulay as U.S. Marshal Brown
- Marty Wright as SWAT Commander
- Raymond Tong as Rastaman
- George Kapetan as Dr. Sonovitch

== Music ==
Transporter 2: Original Motion Picture Soundtrack

Soundtrack album by Various Artists
- Released: 6 September 2005
- Genres: Pop, rock
- Length: 57:05
- Label: TVT Records
- Producer: Various Artists

Singles from Transporter 2: Original Motion Picture Soundtrack
- 1. "Saviour" Released: 2005

Professional ratings
Review scores
Source	Rating
Allmusic	3/5 stars
IGN	6/10 stars

The soundtrack album for Transporter 2 was released in the United States on 6 September 2005 by TVT Records. It features sixteen tracks recorded by various artists, including the film score composed by Alexandre Azaria. James Christopher Monger from Allmusic rated the album three stars out of five, citing Grand National's "Talk Amongst Yourselves", Anggun's "Saviour" and Mylo's "Paris Four Hundred" as the highlights of the soundtrack.

=== Soundtrack ===
No.	Title	Writer(s)	Artist	Length
1.	"Naughty Girl"	Alexandre Azaria	Alexandre Azaria	1:28
2.	"Cells"	Dan Black	The Servant	4:50
3.	"Icarus"	Amen Birdmen	Amen Birdmen	5:02
4.	"Painful" (Morphium Mix)	Brunello	Sin	4:00
5.	"Main Theme"	Alexandre Azaria	Alexandre Azaria	4:09
6.	"Life Support"	Dave Cobb, Dimitris Koutsiouris, Toby Marriott	The Strays	2:56
7.	"Body"	Dan Black	The Servant	4:46
8.	"Talk Amongst Yourselves"	Lawrence Rudd	Grand National	4:31
9.	"Kendo"	Alexandre Azaria	Alexandre Azaria	1:20
10.	"Saviour"	Anggun C. Sasmi, Evelyne Kral, Frederic Jaffre	Anggun	3:44
11.	"Revolution"	Camus Mare Celli	Kate Nauta	3:41
12.	"Paris Four Hundred"	Myles Macinnes	Mylo	3:36
13.	"Can You Handle It?"	Sebo K.	Shakedown	4:04
14.	"Chase"	Ross Bonney, Adam Goemans, Ramsay Miller, Scott Rinning	Cinematics	3:52
15.	"Voodoo Child"	Laurent Daumail	Afu-Ra, DJ Cam	3:13
16.	"Jet Boxing"	Alexandre Azaria	Alexandre Azaria	2:19
Total length:				50:05

== Reception ==
=== Box office ===
Transporter 2 opened in the United States on 2 September 2005. During its opening weekend, the film grossed $16.5 million in the U.S. In total, it earned $43 million in the U.S. and $85 million worldwide.

=== Critical response ===
On Rotten Tomatoes, the film has a score of 52% based on reviews from 122 critics and an average rating of 5.4/10, with the reported consensus: "A stylish and more focused sequel to The Transporter, the movie is over-the-top fun for fans of the first movie." On Metacritic, the film has a weighted average score 56 out of 100, based on reviews from 29 critics, indicating "mixed or average reviews". Audiences polled by CinemaScore gave the film an average grade of "B+" on an A+ to F scale.

Roger Ebert of the Chicago Sun-Times awarded the film 3 stars out of 4 and said it was better than the original. Stephen Hunter of the Washington Post gave it a negative review and wrote: "Statham isn't the best thing in Transporter 2; he's essentially the only thing."

Director Louis Leterrier stated that Martin was "the first gay action movie hero", suggesting that the character comes out when he refuses a woman's advances by saying, "It's because of who I am." This is contradicted by the first film in the series, in which Martin sleeps with a woman, and Transporter 3, which Leterrier did not direct, in which Martin develops a heterosexual relationship. Asked his opinion of the third film, Leterrier stated that after re-watching his first two films "they aren't that gay".

== Sequel ==
A 2008 sequel, entitled Transporter 3, was released in the U.S. on 26 November 2008. It is the only film in the Transporter trilogy to be distributed by Lionsgate in the US.
