= Avalanche Sharks =

- Promotional release poster
- Written by: Taj Nagaoka
- Directed by: Scott Wheeler
- Starring: Alex Mendeluk; Kate Nauta; Gina Holden; Emily Addison
- Country of origin: Canada
- Original language: English

Production
- Producers: Jacob Silver; Devi Singh; Stan Spry; Eric Scott Woods
- Cinematography: Ioana Vasile
- Editor: Christian McIntire
- Running time: 82 minutes
- Production companies: Odyssey Media; Pulser Productions; Rogue State; The Cartel

Original release
- Network: Syfy (United States)
- Release: January 12, 2014

Avalanche Sharks is a 2014 Canadian made-for-television horror film directed by Scott Wheeler and written by Taj Nagaoka. The film stars Kate Nauta, Emily Addison, Alexander Mendeluk, Mika Brooks, and Jack Cullison.

== Plot ==
In a small town alongside a mountain, spring break is approaching. One of the residents, Wade, attempts to search for his brother, Shredder who went missing along with his friend, Hucker, while skiing on the mountain. On the night after his brother's disappearance, he and his girlfriend Madison attempt to get ski patrolman Dale to send out a search and rescue party, although to no avail. An old man named Duffy soon appears at the party, and exclaims that they're all going to die, claiming to have seen sharks in the snow earlier, although Dale gets rid of him. Minutes later, a teenager named Ross heads into the woods, and is killed by a shark.

The next day, Wade and Madison go onto the mountain to search for the missing persons, while Ross' cousin Carol also goes onto the mountain with a teenager named Randy to search for him. After witnessing his girlfriend Barb being eaten by a shark, a young man named Mike runs off, and meets Wade and Madison. The group attempts to get back to town, although Mike is killed by the sharks in the process. Carol and Randy fail to find Ross, but discover his goggles and head back to town. Meanwhile, Adam, the local sheriff, arrests Duffy after he claims that one of his sled dogs was eaten by a shark.

Adam's wife, Diana, soon arrives at his station, where she reveals that she has seen the sharks before, when she was young. She also explains that the sharks were created when an ancient Native American chief created a series of supernatural totems to protect the mountain after a group of mining settlements killed the rest of the Native Americans on the mountain during the gold rush. She deduces that the totems have been disturbed.

Adam and Diana set out to search for the sharks, and instead find Wade and Madison before encountering two of the sharks. The group heads back to the police station where Carol is also to explain Ross's disappearance. Dale, resort owner Lars, and the town's mayor also arrive, and the group attempts to convince them of the sharks, although to no avail. Later, after attempting to hunt down one of the sharks, Adam is fired, and forced to leave the station within a few hours. He releases Duffy as a result. Wade and Madison then attempt to warn Lacy, Jenna and Karla, three of their friends who are in a jacuzzi about the threat, although only one, Jenna, believes them. The other two are soon eaten by one of the sharks. Dale soon witnesses one of the sharks eat a group of teenagers.

An avalanche hits the town shortly afterward and kills Lars. Adam, Diana, and Carol become trapped in the police station during the avalanche and Adam gets out to rescue Wade, Madison, and Jenna, who's eventually eaten. Adam is then eaten as well. Dale arrives, and attempts to kill the sharks, although he is mortally wounded by them. Duffy also arrives, and attempts to get revenge on the sharks for eating his remaining sled dogs, but is soon wounded by them as well. He forces Wade to shoot him as he's eaten and Wade makes an unsuccessful attempt to rescue Dale.

Wade, Madison, Diana and Carol decide to make a break for Dale's truck. Madison, Diana, and Carol escape the cabin, although snow soon fills it and Wade is attacked by a shark, but manages to escape. As this is happening, an Asian woman on the mountain discovers the crooked totems, and begins to straighten them, causing the sharks to disappear one by one. Carol is soon eaten by a shark, as is Dale, although the remaining sharks disappear as a result of the totems being restored. Wade, Madison and Diana then escape in the truck.

The film has a self-parodying framing device featuring an injured snowboarder who supposedly witnesses the events (but isn't shown being present for any of them) as the Unreliable narrator telling the story to a figment of his imagination, while constantly being questioned about inconsistencies.

== Cast ==
- Alexander Mendeluk as Wade
- Kate Nauta as Diana
- Benjamin Easterday as Lars
- Eric Scott Woods as Dale
- Kelle Cantwell as Madison
- Richard Gleason as Sheriff
- Amy Ninh as Hiro
- James Ouimet as Duffy
- Nicole Helen as Carol
- Emily Addison as Jenna
- Mike Ruggieri as Randy
- Erin Ross as Lacey
- Patrizia Cavaliere as Karla
- Matt Gunther as "Shredder"
- Vinny Petengail as Hucker
- Richie Million Jr. as Mike (Richard Million Jr.)
- Erika Jordan as Barb (Yasmin Yeganeh)
- John Hundrieser as Ross
- Haley Stewart as Beca
- Mike Kennedy as The Mayor (Michael Dostrow)
- Mika Brooks as Lola
- Spencer Brennan as Mac (uncredited)
- Jack Cullison as Ted (uncredited)
- Gina Holden as Nurse (uncredited)
- Blake Reistad as Sunbather (uncredited)

== Production ==
Following upon the success of Sharknado, Syfy announced a sequel and the internet was flooded with suggestions toward similar killer-shark topics. In October 2013, they announced a film with a working title of Sharkalanche as a sequel to Sand Sharks. The film was to star Brooke Hogan, but when Hogan had a scheduling conflict, Kate Nauta was brought aboard for the role of Diana. The movie was filmed at Mammoth Ski Resort, in California.

== See also ==
- List of natural horror films
- Sand Sharks
- Snow Shark
