= Alexandre Azaria =

French composer, songwriter and guitar player

Alexandre Azaria also known by his alias Replicant (born 3 September 1967) is a French composer, songwriter and musician. He presently signs only by his own name.

== In bands ==
Azaria started in the 1980s as musician in bands. He was in the French rock band Le Cri de la mouche. In 1996, for a brief period, he became part of the famous French band Indochine as guitarist. He co-wrote and co-produced the album Wax for the band and left soon after in 1997.

== Soundtracks ==
He has concentrated on composing for the soundtracks of the following films.

- 1998: Comme un poisson hors de l'eau by Hervé Hadmar
- 2002: Peau d'Ange by Vincent Perez
- 2002: The Transporter by Corey Yuen and Louis Leterrier (additional music composer)
- 2003: Fanfan la Tulipe by Gérard Krawczyk
- 2004: Les Dalton by Philippe Haïm
- 2005: Transporter 2 by Louis Leterrier
- 2005: Time Jam: Valerian & Laureline (animated series) by Philippe Vidal and Eiichi Sato
- 2005: La vie est à nous ! by Gérard Krawczyk
- 2006: Astérix et les Vikings by Stefan Fjeldmark and Jesper Møller
- 2007: L'Auberge rouge by Gérard Krawczyk
- 2008: Transporter 3 by Olivier Megaton
- 2008: Secret défense by Philippe Haïm
- 2008: 15 ans et demi by François Desagnat
- 2009: Le Petit Nicolas by Arnaud Bouron
- 2010: Imogène McCarthery by Alexandre Charlot and Franck Magnier
- 2011: Case départ by Lionel Steketee, Fabrice Eboué and Thomas N'Gijol
- 2015: The Transporter Refueled by Camille Delamarre
- 2016: La Dream Team by Thomas Sorriaux
