= Adrian Dearnell =

American jazz musician

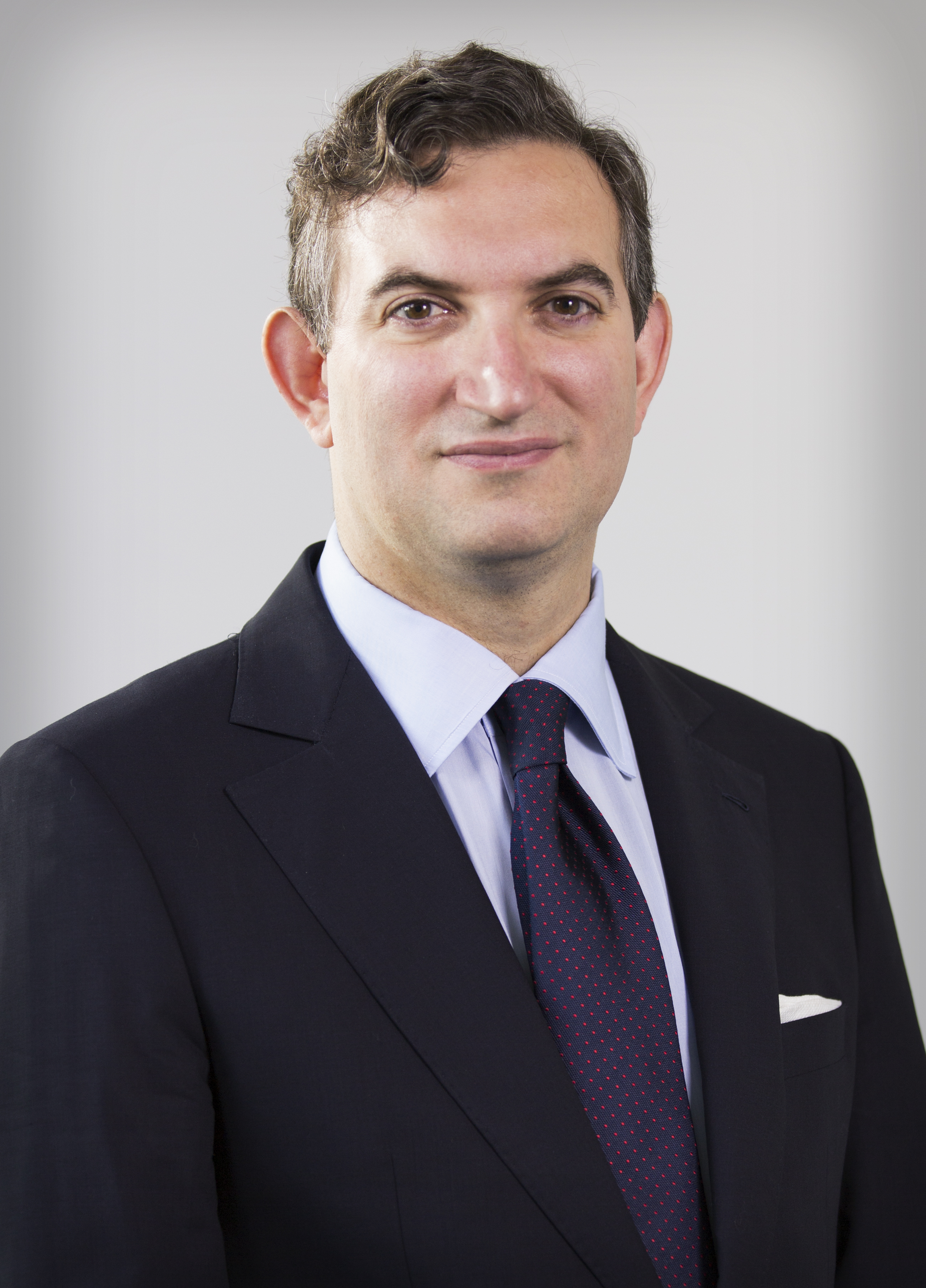
Adrian Dearnell

Adrian Dearnell, a Franco-American financial journalist, is the founder and CEO of EuroBusiness Media, and former anchorman for several TV and radio stations such as Bloomberg TV.

== Biography ==
A graduate of Phillips Exeter Academy and Brown University, Dearnell first worked for ABC News in Paris, and then for Bloomberg TV in London. He subsequently became the main anchor for Bloomberg TV in France, conducting more than 3,000 interviews with market strategists, chief economists, financial analysts, portfolio managers, and a majority of the CEOs of publicly traded companies in France.

In 2002, Dearnell founded EuroBusiness Media, which specializes in the production and distribution of web TV interviews with CEOs of publicly traded companies. These web TV interviews, called CEO-Direct, are broadcast worldwide to a targeted audience of institutional investors and financial analysts. The company collects the best practices of Anglo- American communication into eight points, entitled EBM's Communic8, highlighting the proven, most-effective principles of business communications and delivering the message either verbally, in writing or by video.

As a bilingual financial journalist, Dearnell is regularly called upon to do media training for executives, asset managers and other financial professionals who are expected to interact with the media or communicate in front of an audience. These trainings are often specialized to address the presentation of financial information. He is also often called upon to act as interviewer/moderator for corporate conferences and seminars, and regularly interviews asset managers as well.

In December 2014 Dearnell compiled more than two decades of coaching experience and international business TV interviews with CEOs into a handbook on media training.

Adrian is the author of two books:

- "Le média training réussir face aux journalistes", published by Eyrolles in 2014, in French.

- "L'Art des présentations percutantes", co-written with Andrés Hoyos-Gomez and published in 2017 by Eyrolles.

Dearnell is the former President of the Anglo-American Press Association of Paris – the oldest foreign correspondent association in France – which he continues to support actively.

A semi-professional jazz musician, he plays the double bass in several jazz bands, and collaborates with the jazz bassist Pierre Boussaguet. He appears as the newscaster in the Hollywood blockbuster movie The Transporter.

== Filmography ==
Year	Title	Role	Notes
2002	The Transporter	Newscaster	

== See also ==
- List of Brown University people
- List of Phillips Exeter Academy alumni
