= Transporter 3 =

- Theatrical release poster
- Directed by: Olivier Megaton
- Written by: Luc Besson; Robert Mark Kamen
- Based on: Characters by Luc Besson; Robert Mark Kamen
- Produced by: Luc Besson; Steve Chasman
- Starring: Jason Statham; Natalya Rudakova; François Berléand; Robert Knepper
- Cinematography: Giovanni Fiore Coltellacci
- Edited by: Camille Delamarre; Carlo Rizzo
- Music by: Alexandre Azaria
- Production companies: EuropaCorp; TF1 Films Production; Grive Productions; Apipoulaï Prod.; Current Entertainment; Canal+; CinéCinéma
- Distributed by: EuropaCorp Distribution (France); Lionsgate (Worldwide)
- Release date: 26 November 2008
- Running time: 104 minutes
- Country: France
- Language: English
- Budget: €26.6 million ($40 million)
- Box office: $112.9 million

Transporter 3 (French: Le Transporteur 3) is a 2008 English-language French action film directed by Olivier Megaton. As a sequel to Transporter 2 (2005), it is the third installment in the Transporter film series and the final installment of the original trilogy, but not the last movie, since it was succeeded by The Transporter Refueled. Jason Statham and François Berléand reprise their roles as Frank Martin and Inspector Tarconi. Frank Martin returns to France in order to continue his low-key business of delivering packages without question. Transporter 3 grossed $112.9 million, making it the highest-grossing film in the trilogy.

== Plot ==
On a cargo ship, two workers open a container with toxic waste and die from fumes. The captain, knowing the cargo, disposes of their bodies. Meanwhile, Frank Martin, returning from Miami to the French Riviera, unsuccessfully fishes with Tarconi, who gets a call about a black Audi A8 that bypassed customs and police. In Odesa, Ukrainian Environmental Agency Minister Leonid Tomilenko receives a threat from corrupt Ecocorp official Jonas Johnson to resume negotiations.

That night, the Audi crashes into Frank's home, driven by Malcolm Manville, from a job Frank had previously declined. Paramedics take Malcolm away, revealing a passenger who warns Frank not to take her. He realizes the metal bracelets on her and Malcolm will detonate if they stray from the car, but the ambulance explodes, killing Malcolm. Frank is knocked unconscious by Johnson's henchman, wakes up with an explosive bracelet, and is forced to drive Malcolm's passenger, Valentina, and a package to Budapest.

Ecocorp, after secretly dealing with Tomilenko to bring a ship full of toxic waste into the country, tells him to expect seven more ships. Tomilenko has one day to sign Ecocorp's agreement, so he sends agents to find Frank's destination via Malcolm's GPS. While Tarconi looks into Johnson's motives, Frank visits Otto. Johnson's men arrive, order them back, and Frank fights them off, but Otto can't disarm the explosive transmitter in the car.

Frank reaches Budapest, but one of Johnson's men steals the Audi with Valentina inside. Chasing them down by bicycle, Frank recovers the car, and Johnson redirects him to Bucharest. Pursued by Tomilenko's agents in a black Mercedes-Benz E-Class, Frank maneuvers them off a cliff and realizes Valentina is the real package. Valentina is revealed to be Tomilenko's daughter, who was drugged in Eivissa and transported by Malcolm for Johnson to blackmail her father.

Johnson ambushes Frank and Valentina on a bridge in Odesa, with Valentina captured and her bracelet removed. Frank drives into a lake, and Johnson leaves him to die. Underwater, Frank inflates a plastic bag with air from the car's tires, surfacing where Tarconi and Ukrainian police rescue him. On a train with Valentina, Johnson gives Tomilenko fifteen minutes to sign the contract.

Frank jumps the Audi onto the train, killing Johnson's men, but Johnson is too far to reach. He uncouples the train cabs, leaving himself and Valentina on one train and Frank on another. Frank reaches the Audi, jumping into the next cab with Johnson and Valentina. They fight; Frank subdues Johnson, takes his key, attaches the bracelet instead, and reverses the Audi. The bracelet detonates, killing Johnson. Frank reunites with Valentina. Tomilenko learns Valentina is safe with Tarconi and tears up Ecocorp contracts as police raid the cargo ship. Frank and Tarconi go back to fishing in Marseilles with Valentina.

== Cast ==
- Jason Statham as Frank Martin
- Natalya Rudakova as Valentina Tomilenko
- François Berléand as Inspector Tarconi
- Robert Knepper as Jonas Johnson
- Jeroen Krabbé as Leonid Tomilenko
- Alex Kobold as Leonid's Aide
- Katia Tchenko as Leonid's Secretary
- David Atrakchi as Malcolm Manville
- Yann Sundberg as Flag
- Eriq Ebouaney as Ice
- David Kammenos as Driver Market
- Silvio Simac as Mighty Joe
- Oscar Relier as Thug / Driver
- Timo Dierkes as Otto
- Igor Koumpan as Ukrainian cop
- Paul Barrett as Captain
- Elef Zack as Mate
- Michel Neugarten as Sergei
- Farid Elquardi as Yuri
- Semmy Schilt as the Giant

== Production ==
Natalya Rudakova was spotted by Luc Besson on the street as she hurried to her job at a New York City hair salon. He paid for 25 acting lessons over a six-month period, and brought her to audition in Paris, before she received the role. Roger Ebert noted the rarity of leading ladies who are heavily freckled. Shooting was initially expected to last for 16 weeks, in France. It was also filmed in Odesa, Ukraine.

== Release ==
=== Home media ===
Transporter 3 was released on DVD and Blu-ray Disc on March 10, 2009 in the United States. 1,108,030 units were sold, bringing in $19.7 million in revenue. Icon Films picked up the rights to distribute the film in the UK and Australia.

== Reception ==
=== Box office ===
Unlike its predecessors, Transporter 3 was released by Lionsgate Films instead of 20th Century Fox in the United States. On its opening weekend, the film opened at number 7 with $12 million. The film grossed $31.7 million in the United States and in Canada and $77.3 million in other countries, for a total gross of $109 million worldwide, making it the highest-grossing film in the Transporter trilogy. '

=== Critical response ===
On the review aggregator website Rotten Tomatoes, 40% of 115 critics' reviews are positive, with an average rating of 4.8/10. The website's consensus reads: "This middling installment in the Transporter franchise is a few steps down from its predecessors, featuring generic stunts and a lack of energy." Metacritic, which uses a weighted average, assigned the film a score of 51 out of 100, based on 26 critics, indicating "mixed or average" reviews. Audiences polled by CinemaScore gave the film an average grade of "B−" on an A+ to F scale.

Roger Ebert gave praise to Megaton's direction for sidestepping the shaky cam for more stable visuals and found Statham to be a "splendid action hero," calling it "a perfectly acceptable brainless action thriller, inspiring us to give a lot of thought to complex sequences we would have been better off sucking on as eye candy." Entertainment Weekly's Lisa Schwarzbaum rated the film a B grade, noting how the plot is similar to previous efforts but said it "makes good on its formula with no pretensions." Marc Savlov of The Austin Chronicle said, "Transporter 3 is terrifically stupid fun, in the very best (or worst, depending on your tolerance for this sort of thing) sense." The A.V. Club's Scott Tobias said the movie falls short of the standards set by the first two Transporter films but gave praise to the "Speed-like bracelet gimmick" for delivering on the action scenes and the decent chemistry between Statham and Rudakova, concluding that: "It's enough to pass the time, but just barely." Mike Mayo of The Washington Post called it "the best of the unapologetically ridiculous series", pointing out the "hyperactive editing" in the cartoonish vehicular stunts and fight scenes, concluding that: "Overall, the production has the polish and pace that producer/co-writer Luc Besson's work is known for. Any complaints about the lack of substance are pointless."

Jim Vejvoda of IGN wrote that: "Transporter 3 gets some points for a few cleverly handled action sequences, but the romantic subplot and nods to Crank ultimately undermine the film." Norman Wilner of NOW criticized the premise for lacking the "nice balance between car stunts and gymnastic punch-ups" from previous films and forcing Statham to perform more driving scenes than hand-to-hand combat ones, concluding that: "It's not the best use of his talents." Jeremiah Kipp of Slant Magazine was critical of the filmmakers utilizing the "ultra-slick, sexy-sheen, redundant style of car commercials" for their overall visual aesthetic and Statham's dry humor coming across like Sean Connery's James Bond in Goldfinger. Peter Howell of the Toronto Star criticized the overall plot structure and monotonous pacing for betraying the film's "action status," saying: "You know a series is in trouble when it begins mocking its own premise." James Berardinelli called it "the most frustrating entry into a series that has never set the bar terribly high", commending Statham and the fight scenes he's in but was critical of the nonsensical plot trying to fit in with the action scenes and the car chases coming across as "empty amusement", concluding that: "Transporter 3 is proof that brain-dead action movies can be found in theaters during Oscar season as well as during the summer. Fans of the first two Transporter films will likely find this one diverting, although it is a step in the wrong direction. Others will wonder how a movie this disjointed and poorly scripted could get made."

Rudakova's performance was generally derided by critics. Berardinelli commended her sexual appeal, despite not being "conventionally attractive" for the role, but felt her English delivery came off like "phonetic readings." Vejvoda called it "one of the most grating film debuts of all time," criticizing her romantic scenes opposite Statham as not "particularly charming or sexy." Conversely, Ebert said that "Rudakova is no Bonnie Hunt when it comes to personality. She skulks, pouts, clams up, looks out the window, and yet falls in love with the Transporter. Some perfectionists will no doubt criticize her acting. I say the hell with her acting. Look at those freckles. I can never get enough of freckles." Peter Hartlaub of the San Francisco Chronicle found her to be the "perfect woman" for the film, pointing out her "Dennis the Menace freckles, red hair and semi-crazy behavior," and lacking the "plastic hotness of your primped-up Bond girl."
