= Kate Nauta =

American model and actress, born 1982

- Born: Kate Lynn Nauta; April 30, 1982 (age 44); Salem, Oregon, United States
- Occupations: Celebrity, model, singer
- Years active: 2005–present
- Modeling information
- Height: 5 ft 9.5 in (1.77 m)
- Hair color: Blonde
- Eye color: Blue

Kate Lynn Nauta (born April 30, 1982) is an American fashion model, actress and singer. One of her major roles in feature films was Lola in Transporter 2. She previously used the name Katie professionally.

== Biography ==
Nauta was born in Salem, Oregon, and grew up in Woodburn, Oregon, where she lived until 2000. She graduated from Woodburn High School in 2000. She started modeling at age 15. At 17 she was a winner of the U.S. Elite Model Look contest and went on to compete in the finals in Nice, France in 1999. She is now managed by Mode Models International. She has modelled for Versace (Sport and Versus), L'Oréal, DKNY, and Abercrombie & Fitch as well as doing advertisements for, among others, Motorola.

Luc Besson cast Nauta as 'Lola' in Transporter 2 and used two of her songs on its soundtrack. She also stars in the web series Fear Clinic.

Nauta also sings and writes songs. She has worked on music with Lenny Kravitz. Her song "Revolution" is on the soundtrack of Transporter 2. Also, she is featured in the song "Name Game (Remember)" by hip-hop/rap group Naughty by Nature.

Currently she designs houses with her husband Robert.

== Filmography ==
List of acting performances in film and television
Year	Title	Role	Notes
2005	Transporter 2	Lola	
2007	The Game Plan	Tatianna	
2009	Fear Clinic	Jackie	
2009	Nine Miles Down	Jennie "JC" Christianson	
2009	The Good Guy	Cynthia	
2010	Choose	Jenna	
2010	The Somnambulist	Nurse Mary	
2011	Mercedes Benz: Drive and Seek	Ivy	
2013	And Then There Was You	Kayla	
2013	Avalanche Sharks	Diana	
2014	37	Dani	
