= Camille Delamarre =

French film editor and director

- Born: October 3, 1979 (age 46)
- Occupations: Film editor, director
- Years active: 2004–present
- Known for: The Transporter Refueled; Brick Mansions

Camille Delamarre is a French film editor and director, best known for directing The Transporter Refueled and Brick Mansions. He edited films including Transporter 3 and Taken 2, among others.

== Career ==
In 2014, Delamarre made his directing debut with the action film Brick Mansions, starring Paul Walker, David Belle and Rza. It was written by Luc Besson and Robert Mark Kamen and released on April 23, 2014.

In 2015, Delamarre directed another action thriller film The Transporter Refueled, a reboot of the Transporter franchise. The film stars Ed Skrein and Ray Stevenson and was released on September 4, 2015 in the United States by Relativity Media.

== Filmography ==
| Year | Film | Functioned as | | Notes |
| Year | Film | Director | Editor | Notes |
|---|---|---|---|---|
| 2004 | Le hors-champ | Yes | Yes | Documentary |
| 2008 | Transporter 3 | No | Yes | |
| 2010 | 22 Bullets | No | Yes | |
| 2010 | Fatal | No | Yes | Co-editor |
| 2011 | Colombiana | No | Yes | |
| 2012 | Lockout | No | Yes | |
| 2012 | Taken 2 | No | Yes | |
| 2013 | Aux Armes: AIDES | No | Yes | Short film |
| 2013 | Last Call | Yes | Yes | Short film |
| 2014 | Brick Mansions | Yes | No | Directing debut |
| 2015 | The Transporter Refueled | Yes | No | |
| 2023 | Assassin Club | Yes | No | |
