= Chris Vance (actor) =

British actor (born 1971)

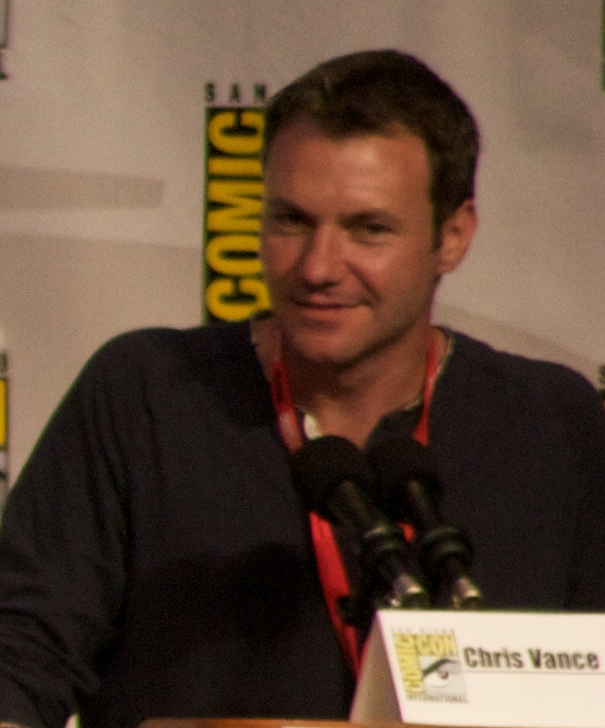
- Vance at the 2010 San Diego Comic-Con
- Born: George Christopher Vance; 30 December 1977 (age 48); Paddington, London, England
- Citizenship: United Kingdom; Australia
- Occupation: Actor
- Years active: 1997–present
- Spouse: Ramona Vance (m. 2017)

George Christopher Vance (born 30 December 1971) is a British and Australian actor. He is known for his starring roles in television, such as Jack Gallagher in the Fox series Mental (2009), as James Whistler in Fox's series Prison Break (2007–2008), and for playing Frank Martin in TNT's Transporter: The Series. Vance has recurred on the television series Burn Notice, Dexter, Rizzoli & Isles, and Supergirl. He played Commander Harry Langford on Hawaii Five-0, and Dalton Walsh in the fifth season of Amazon Prime Video's police drama series Bosch.

== Early years ==
Of Irish descent, Vance attended St Bede's Secondary School in Lawrence Weston, Bristol, and played youth football for West Bromwich Albion and Bristol Rovers. He then attended Newcastle University, graduating with an honours degree in civil engineering.

== Career ==
Vance began his acting career at the age of 25 appearing in stage productions, initially in repertory theatre before appearing in Patrick Marber's play Closer and David Edgar's play Albert Speer, both at the Royal National Theatre, the latter being directed by Trevor Nunn. He then made guest appearances in British television series including Kavanagh QC, Peak Practice, The Bill and Doctors.

In 2002, Vance moved to Australia and appeared in the Australian television series Stingers and Blue Heelers, before achieving success in the role of Sean Everleigh in All Saints. In 2007, he moved to the United States and appeared in the third and fourth seasons of Prison Break, portraying James Whistler.

In June 2008, Vance moved to Colombia in order to film the Fox series Mental, but the show was cancelled after 13 episodes. He guest–starred in an antagonistic role as Mason Gilroy on the USA Network series Burn Notice for five episodes toward the end of season 3. He appeared on Showtime series' fifth season of Dexter as Cole, chief of security for a popular motivational speaker who becomes implicated in a series of heinous female torture-murders in Southern Florida. From 2012-2014, he played Frank Martin in Transporter: The Series, a French-Canadian production.

== Filmography ==
Television and film roles
Year	Title	Role	Notes
1998	Kavanagh QC	Yob	Episode: "Briefs Trooping Gaily"
2001	Peak Practice	SHO / John	2 episodes
2002	The Bill	Computer Expert	Episode: "011"
2003	Doctors	John	Episode: "As Time Goes By"
2003	Blue Heelers	Andrew Purkiss	Episode: "Safety Last"
2004	Stingers	Sean Hunter	Recurring role (season 8), 6 episodes
2005	The Secret Life of Us	Piers	3 episodes
2005–2007	All Saints	Sean Everleigh	Main role (seasons 9–10)
2006	Macbeth	Detective Caithness	Film
2007–2008	Prison Break	James Whistler	Main role (season 3); guest role (season 4)
2009	Mental	Jack Gallagher	Main role
2010	Burn Notice	Mason Gilroy	Recurring role (season 3), 5 episodes
2010	Dexter	Cole Harmon	3 episodes
2011	Fairly Legal	Paul Shelton	Episode: "Ultravinyl"
2011–2016	Rizzoli & Isles	Lt. Colonel Charles "Casey" Jones	Recurring role (seasons 2–4), 10 episodes
2012–2014	Transporter: The Series	Frank Martin	Lead role
2013	Crossing Lines	Wolf	Episode: "The Animals"
2015–2016	Supergirl	Non	Recurring role (season 1), 9 episodes
2016–2020	Hawaii Five-0	Commander Harry Langford	Recurring role (seasons 7–10), 5 episodes
2019	Bosch	Dalton Walsh	4 episodes (season 5)
2022	The Equalizer	Mason Quinn	2 episodes
