= Transporter: The Series =

2012 action drama series

- English logo
- Genre: Action/Adventure; Thriller
- Based on: Transporter by Luc Besson; Robert Mark Kamen
- Developed by: Alexander Ruemelin
- Directed by: Stephen Williams; Brad Turner; Andy Mikita; T. J. Scott; Bruce McDonald; George Mihalka
- Starring: Chris Vance; Andrea Osvárt; François Berléand; Delphine Chanéac; Charly Hübner; Violante Placido
- Theme music composer: Geddy Lee; Alex Lifeson
- Opening theme: "Working Man"; Written by Rush; Arranged by Jamie Forsyth; Performed by Danielle Armstrong
- Composer: Nathaniel Méchaly
- Countries of origin: France; Canada; Germany
- Original language: English
- No. of seasons: 2
- No. of episodes: 24 (list of episodes)

Production
- Executive producers: Brad Turner; Fred Fuchs; Timothy J. Lea
- Producers: Susan Murdoch; Klaus Zimmermann
- Production locations: France, Canada, Germany
- Cinematography: David Herrington; Stephen Reizes
- Editors: Roslyn Kalloo; Stephen Lawrence; Eric Goddard; David B. Thompson; Don Cassidy
- Camera setup: Single-camera
- Running time: 45 minutes
- Production companies: Atlantique Productions; QVF Inc.

Original release
- Network: RTL (Germany); M6 (France); HBO Canada (Canada, English); Super Écran 1 (Canada, French)
- Release: 11 October 2012 – 14 December 2014

Transporter: The Series (French: Le Transporteur : la série) is an action-thriller television series, a spinoff of the Transporter film series created by Luc Besson and Robert Mark Kamen, with Chris Vance taking over the role of Frank Martin for the series. It was co-produced by the French Atlantique Productions and the Canadian boutique entertainment company QVF, Inc. The series was broadcast by M6, RTL Television, The Movie Network, and Movie Central. Originally, HBO and Cinemax were involved, but they dropped out in 2013.

Twelve episodes were ordered in 2012 for the first season with an overall budget of US$40 million or €30 million. The show premiered that year on 11 October in Germany on RTL, and on 6 December in France on M6. The Canadian premiere was on 4 January 2013 on HBO Canada and Super Écran 1 (with the first episode available online on 18 December 2012). The series started broadcasting in India on 25 January 2013 on Sony PIX, and premiered in the United States on TNT on 18 October 2014. Twelve more episodes were ordered for season 2, which began production in Morocco in February 2014. Season 2 premiered in Canada on 5 October 2014 on The Movie Network and Movie Central, and in the United States on TNT on 29 November 2014. On 26 November 2015, it was announced that the series was cancelled and would not be renewed for a third season with the second season ending on an unresolved cliffhanger.

== Overview ==
The series follows the events and concept of the film trilogy, continuing the adventures of Frank Martin, a professional freelance courier driver for hire who will deliver anything, anywhere for the right price, and lives by three "unbreakable" rules, which he frequently breaks. Chris Vance takes over the role of Frank from Jason Statham and was joined in season 1 by Andrea Osvárt as his office manager Carla Valeri, Charly Hübner as mechanic Dieter Hausmann and François Berléand, the only returning actor from the film series, reprising his role as Inspector Tarconi. The second season added Violante Placido as Caterina "Cat" Boldieu, his new booking agent. Unlike Carla, who did not return for the second season, Cat usually joins Frank on his adventures.

== Episodes ==
Season	Episodes	Originally aired		DVD & Blu-ray release date	
Season	Episodes	Originally aired		Region 2	
Season	Episodes	Season premiere	Season finale	Germany	France
1	12	11 October 2012	3 January 2013	21 December 2012	23 January 2013
2	12	5 October 2014	14 December 2014	N/A	N/A

== Cast ==
=== Main ===
- Chris Vance as Frank Martin, known as the Transporter: a professional highly skilled driver for hire. A former SAS and Special Forces operative, he offers his transporter services without asking any questions, to whoever is willing to pay his price. His code of conduct is very strict, and his precision driving and combat skills allow him to survive the most dangerous criminals throughout his missions. Very secretive, Frank trusts only a handful of people: his agent Carla, his mechanic Dieter, and a French police inspector named Tarconi. His circle of friends will grow with the arrival of Juliette, a mysterious woman interested in his work.
- Andrea Osvárt as Carla Valeri (season 1): a computer expert, she assists in Frank's missions by negotiating with clients and providing him with information from an office in Nice.
- François Berléand as Inspector Tarconi (season 1; recurring season 2): Frank's reluctant police officer friend. Stationed in Nice, Tarconi has in the past investigated Frank. Now friends, Tarconi takes care of his house in Cap Roux when Frank's on a mission. Frank turns to him when he needs an official police intervention, but always in a way that Tarconi can deny any involvement with the Transporter. He maintains his status as an officer of the law but allows Frank to bend the rules somewhat.
- Delphine Chanéac as Juliette Dubois (season 1): a DCRI agent investigating the Transporter network, while posing as Frank's beautiful and romantic neighbor. She is torn between her spying and her growing attraction for Frank. Earlier on in the project, the character was a reporter named Olivia.
- Charly Hübner as Dieter Hausmann (season 1; guest season 2): a technology expert who helps Frank with his car. He is Frank's confidant and an unparalleled mechanic who repairs and modifies his Audi at will. Whether Frank needs special tires, suspensions or fake plates, Dieter is always there when Frank needs him. Dieter is killed in the premiere of season 2.
- Violante Placido as Caterina "Cat" Boldieu (season 2): a spy for French intelligence who first met Frank when he rescued her from captivity in North Africa. Now two years later, Cat has come to work for Frank as his new booking agent.

=== Recurring ===
- Mark Rendall as Jules Faroux (season 2): a computer expert working for a rival transporter that crosses paths with Frank in the second-season episode "T2", Jules soon joins Frank's and Cat's team.
- Dhaffer L'Abidine as Olivier Dassin (season 2): The cold-blooded Dassin is the second-best transporter in the world and Frank's rival and old nemesis. Frank is forced to team up with him to carry out the job.
- Elyse Levesque as Zara Knight (season 2): A former UN Diplomat and Frank's love interest from the past who was presumed dead and was abducted by Dassin on the orders of an arms dealer called Burton. She has a son whose father, unbeknownst to him, is Frank.

== Production ==
The pilot was directed by long-time Lost director Stephen Williams. Other directors working on the show include Bruce McDonald (Degrassi: The Next Generation, Queer as Folk) and Andy Mikita, known for working on several shows including Stargate Universe and SyFy's Sanctuary. The only writer who has been confirmed so far is Carl Binder, also a Stargate Universe alumnus.

Originally Canadian TV veterans Joseph Mallozzi and Paul Mullie, known for their work on Stargate Universe, served as show runners and co-wrote the pilot. According to The Hollywood Reporter they were replaced after two episodes by British director Steve Shill (Dexter, Law & Order: Criminal Intent, The Tudors) and Canadian veteran supervising producer Karen Wookey (Andromeda, Mutant X). However, Shill left the project in January 2012 without an immediate successor in place.

Shooting locations included Paris, Berlin, and Nice, however the majority of the filming was done in Toronto, Ontario. In October 2011, filming on the series was halted after Chris Vance was injured in an on-set accident. The remaining scenes were supposed to be shot in Toronto during the spring of 2012. The show was shot with Arri Alexa, Canon C300 and GoPro cameras.

On 26 November 2015, it was announced that the series had been cancelled.

=== Cars ===
Season	Manufacturer	Model
1	Audi	A8 Security
1	Audi	R8 (nicknamed Sofie)

== Broadcast ==
The series started airing out-of-order on RTL in Germany on 11 October 2012 at a pace of one weekly episode in prime time on Thursdays with a TV-12 rating. The show's run in the country concluded on 20 December, leaving two episodes unaired.

In France the show started on 6 December 2012 on M6, also in prime time on Thursdays, but with a TV-10 rating and at an initial pace of three episodes per night for two weeks, followed by a "two new episodes plus one rerun" per night pace after a week-long hiatus, and concluded on 10 January 2013. Viewers were given the choice between watching the show in dubbed French or in its original English with optional subtitles, thanks to M6's dual audio streams. Season #2 began airing in France on 1 January 2015.

Transporter: The Series started airing on HBO Canada and Super Écran 1 (in dubbed French) on 4 January 2013 with a special two-hour premiere comprising the episodes Trojan Horsepower and Payback, after which one episode was broadcast weekly, Fridays at 9 PM. Prior to that, the episode Trojan Horsepower was available to watch for free on HBO Canada's website and various Canadians streaming services starting 18 December 2012. Season #1 concluded in Canada on 15 March 2013. Season #2 began airing in Canada on The Movie Network and Movie Central, with back-to-back episodes, on 5 October 2014.

In Australia, it premiered on 20 March 2013 on FX. In New Zealand, the show started on 13 June 2014 on The Box on SKY TV (New Zealand).

In the UK, the show started on 12 July 2015 on Channel 5. In the United States, TNT announced in January 2014 that it had picked up Transporter: The Series, and began airing the show with back-to-back episodes on Saturday, 18 October 2014. TNT's sister network through Time Warner, Cinemax was previously due to air the series, but at the Television Critics Association 2013 Summer Press Tour confirmed that they would end their involvement with the series without showing it after all. The premiere of season #2 aired on 29 November 2014 on TNT, which immediately followed the completion of the airing of season #1 the week before.

=== Episode order and alternative versions ===
Confusingly, RTL in Germany, M6 in France and TNT in the U.S., have all aired the first-season episodes in different orders, as compared to those shown by HBO/SE1 in Canada and Channel 5 in the UK, which have been shown sequentially, as detailed below:

Season 1 episode ordering
Episode	Prod. code	Canada, Dutch, Netflix, et al.	French	German	U.S.	UK
"Trojan Horsepower"	112	1	2	7	1	1
"Payback"	106	2	12	5	6	2
"The General’s Daughter" (Pilot)	101	3	1	1	9	3
"Harvest"	104	4	3	2	7	4
"Dead Drop"	108	5	4	4	2	5
"Hot Ice"	109	6	9	8	3	6
"Give the Guy a Hand"	110	7	10	11	11	7
"Sharks"	103	8	5	6	4	8
"City of Love"	107	9	7	9	10	9
"The Switch"	105	10	8	3	8	10
"12 Hours"	102	11	6	12	5	11
"Cherchez la Femme"	111	12	11	10	12	12

It is unclear at this point what the "proper", intended order for the episodes is. Based on the chronology of events, the Canadian release most likely carries the correct order of episodes. This is further supported by the fact that Flemish channel 2BE, Dutch channel RTL 5, and Netflix also air the episodes according to the Canadian order. The German home video release presents the episodes as they were broadcast on RTL, adding the two unaired episodes ("Give the Guy a Hand" and "12 Hours") as episodes 11 and 12 respectively. It is unknown what order the forthcoming French and potential North American home video releases will reflect. It is however certain that unlike other shows, production order should not be followed, as "Trojan Horsepower" was the last episode to be shot yet features the first meeting between Frank and Juliette, two characters who interact in other episodes, and is also the episode where Frank first sees the red Audi R8 which appears in most later episodes. "Trojan Horsepower" served as the pilot episode in Canada and the United States, the second episode in France and the seventh in Germany; the latter two countries both aired "The General’s Daughter" as the pilot episode, which had in fact been announced in the media as the pilot when production started.

In addition, at least some episodes reportedly have three different edits depending on the country of broadcast.

== Home releases ==
On 3 March 2015, 20th Century Fox Home Entertainment released the complete first season on DVD in Region 1. The complete second season was released on 9 June 2015. Both seasons also received a BluRay release in select markets including Australia and Germany.
