= Loan Chabanol =

American actress

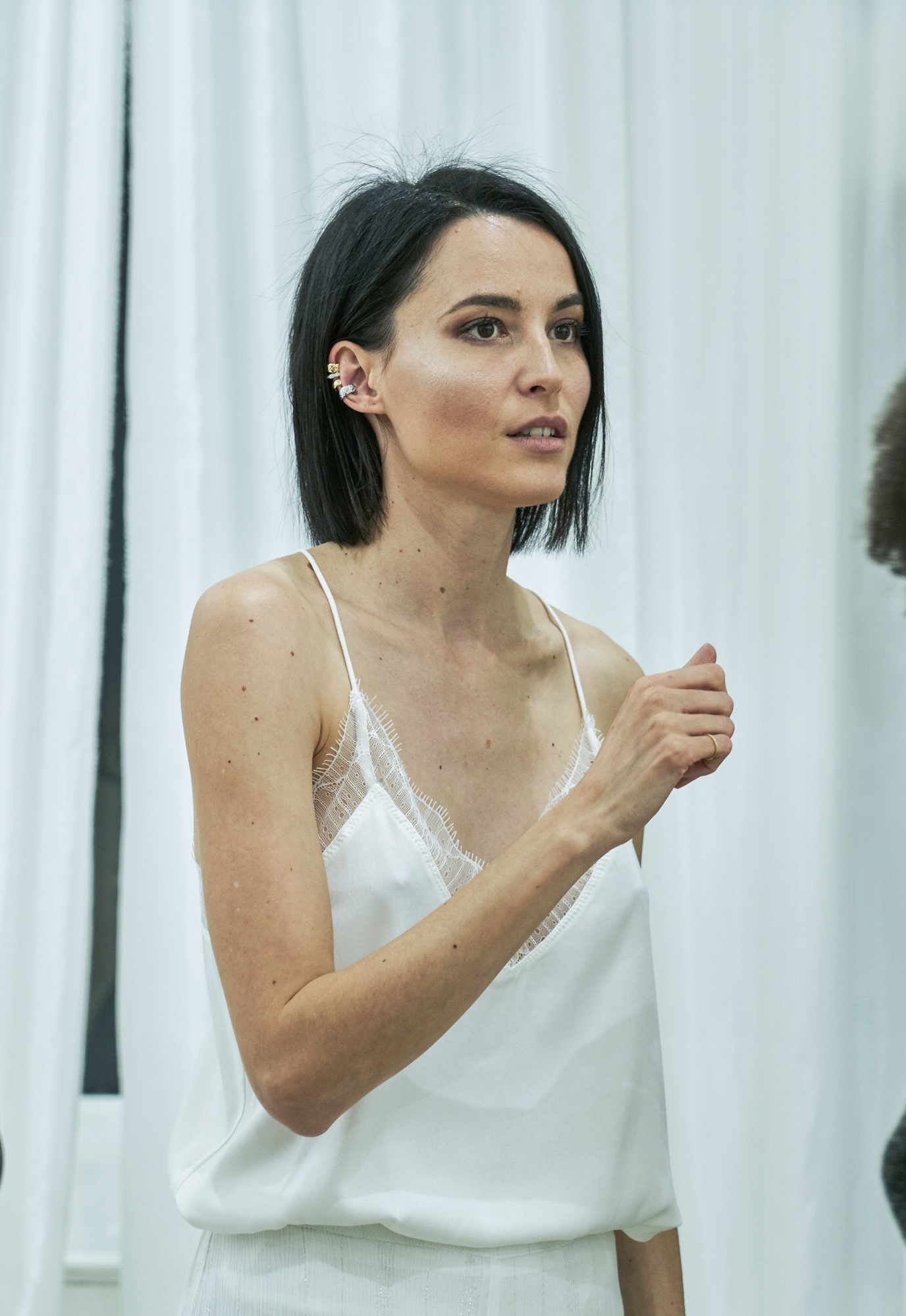
- Loan Chabanol at her NAMSIS Exhibition, Los Angeles
- Born: 30 December 1982 (age 43); Paris, France
- Occupations: Actress, artist, model
- Years active: 2013–present
- Known for: Fading Gigolo; The Transporter Refueled; Tales of the Walking Dead

Loan Chabanol is a French-American actress, visual artist, and model. She is best known for her role in John Turturro's comedy Fading Gigolo, the romantic drama Third Person, the action thriller The Transporter Refueled and the horror drama anthology TV series Tales of the Walking Dead.

== Life and career ==
Loan Chabanol was born in Paris, France on 30 December 1982. She is of Vietnamese, German, and Italian descent. Her early years were spent in art classes with artist Bernard Bistes. Discovered at the age of 16 by Elite Model Management, she has been on the covers of magazines such as Elle , Marie Claire and Cosmopolitan.

In 2010, she moved to New York to study acting at Lee Strasberg Theatre and Film Institute, leading to her film roles in Fading Gigolo (2013), Third Person (2014), and The Transporter Refueled (2015), as well as television appearances including Tales of the Walking Dead (2022). Throughout her career, Chabanol has moved fluidly between performance and the visual arts, deliberately taking breaks from screen work to focus on painting, immersive exhibition, and storytelling. This interplay between disciplines has defined her artistic vision, culminating in the creation of Mika Girl Studio, a platform where she unites her multidisciplinary practice and invites audiences into a space of imagination and wonder.

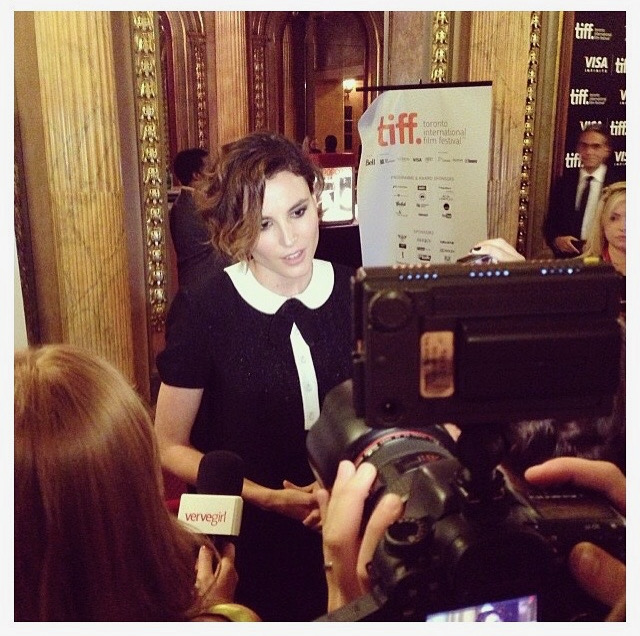
Loan Chabanol at the Toronto Film Festival

== Acting ==
Chabanol got her first feature film role in John Turturro's comedy Fading Gigolo. In 2014, she was cast as Sam in Third Person playing a significant compassionate character along with Mila Kunis. In 2015, she was cast as a lead "femme fatale" in The Transporter Refueled. In 2022, Chabanol entered The Walking Dead universe playing a lead in the first installment of the anthology series, Tales of the Walking Dead, the latest incarnation of the successful AMC series..

== Visual Arts ==
Chabanol has created solo exhibitions spanning painting, immersive art, and animation. Key milestones include: • 2013 — Met with curator Monica Watkins and debuted in a group exhibition, "Art Meets Fashion", in Brooklyn, New York, showcasing 50 artists. • 2015 — Presented her inaugural solo exhibition, "Born in Blue", at The Lightbox in New York City, featuring a short animated film depicting the emergence of a Phoenix from the ocean. • 2018 — Exhibited her series "Namsis" and "Black Namsis" at Show Gallery in Los Angeles and participated in the group show "WeRise" alongside Shepard Fairey and Glenn Kaino. • 2019 — Released her first children's book, "Blueboo", about a blue monster living in the Brown Woods who encounters the last caterpillar in the forest. • 2025 — Showcased "Reminiscence" at Tamsen Gallery in Santa Barbara, a retrospective exploring her relationship with horses following her father's death.

== Personal life ==
In February 2020, Chabanol became an American citizen. She currently lives in Los Angeles with her partner Wally Pfister.

== Filmography ==
=== Feature films ===
- Fading Gigolo (2013)
- Third Person (2014)
- The Transporter Refueled (2015)

=== TV series ===
- Tales of the Walking Dead (2022)

=== Short films ===
- Psycho Nacirema (2013), Buster Keaton
