= Fundamental Films =

Chinese film company

- Industry: Film
- Founded: 2008; 18 years ago
- Headquarters: Shanghai, China
- Key people: Mark Gao (chairman)
- Website: http://www.fundamentalfilms.cn

Fundamental Films is a Chinese film production company and distributor based in Shanghai and founded in 2008. In September 2016 it was announced the company had acquired a stake of 27.9% in French film company EuropaCorp, becoming the second-largest shareholder in the company.

== Filmography ==
- The Transporter Refueled (2015)
- The Precipice Game (2016)
- Nine Lives (2016)
- The Warriors Gate (2016)
- Super Express (2016)
- Valerian and the City of a Thousand Planets (2017)
- 24 Hours to Live (2017)
- Replicas (2018)
- Outlaws Inc. (TBA)
- The Black Chamber (TBA)
