= Louis Leterrier =

French film director (born 1973)

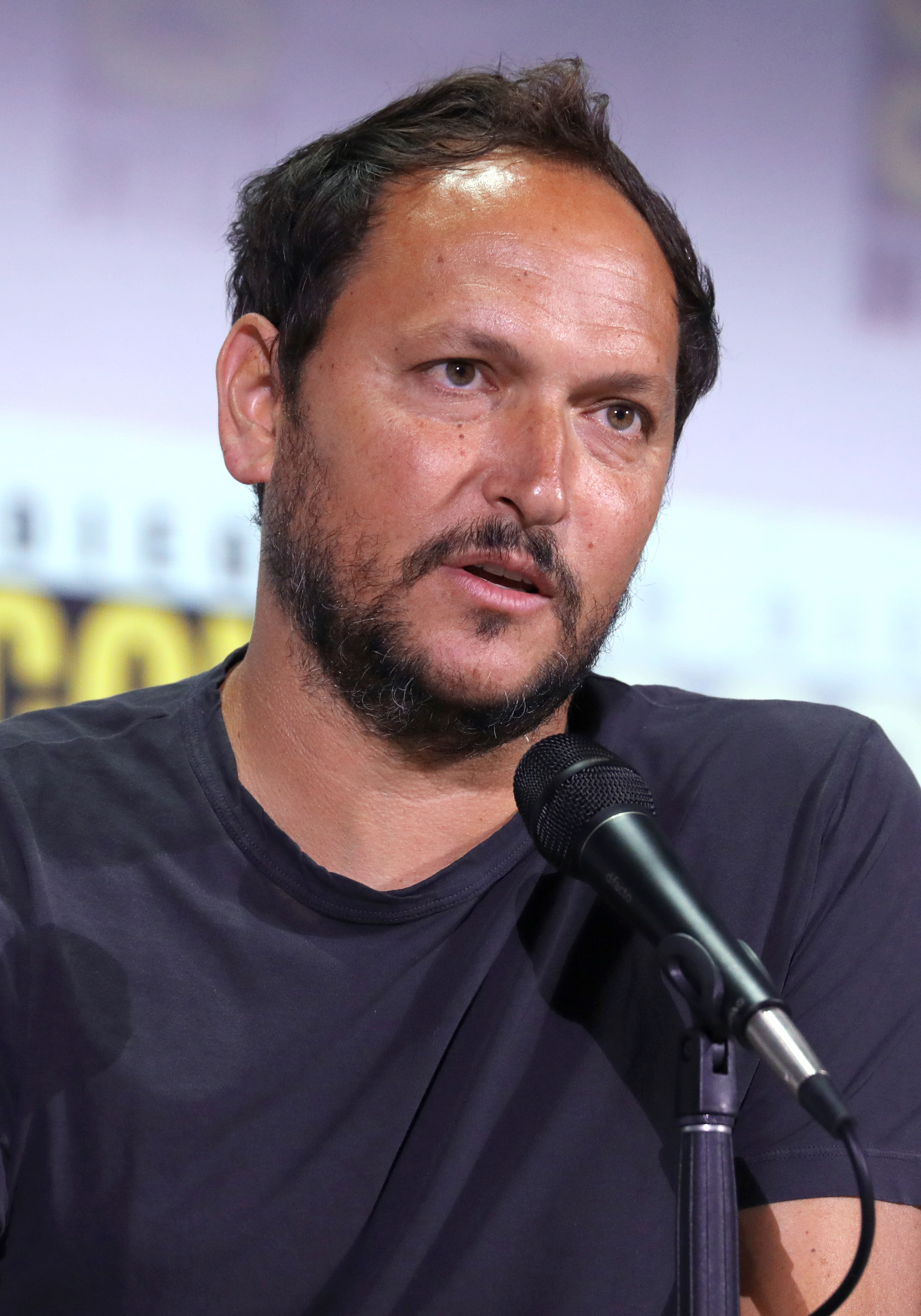
- Leterrier at the 2023 San Diego Comic-Con
- Born: 17 June 1973 (age 53); Paris, France
- Education: New York University Tisch School of the Arts
- Occupations: Film director; producer
- Years active: 1997–present
- Spouse(s): Béatrice Leterrier (divorced) Cameron Richardson (m. 2021)
- Children: 2
- Parents: François Leterrier (father); Catherine Leterrier (mother)
- Relatives: François Fabius (uncle); Laurent Fabius (uncle)

Louis Leterrier (French: [lwi lətɛʁje]; born 17 June 1973) is a French film and television director. Best known for his work in action films, he directed the first two Transporter films (2002–2005), The Incredible Hulk (2008), Clash of the Titans (2010), Now You See Me (2013), and the tenth and eleventh Fast & Furious installments, Fast X (2023) and the upcoming Fast Forever (2028). He also directed the streaming television series The Dark Crystal: Age of Resistance (2019) and Lupin (2021).

== Career ==
In 1997, he assisted Jean-Pierre Jeunet on the set of Alien Resurrection. On returning to France, he worked with Luc Besson on the production of commercials for Club Internet and L'Oréal as well as on the film The Messenger: The Story of Joan of Arc. He also collaborated, as the second assistant director, with Alain Chabat on the production of Asterix & Obelix: Mission Cleopatra (2002).

Later in 2002, Leterrier directed The Transporter, an action movie starring Jason Statham. Although the US release lists him as artistic director and Corey Yuen as director, the opening credits of the European release grant him directorial credit and list Yuen as action director. Leterrier later entered the so-called "Besson stable" – a group of directors working on films produced by or associated with Besson – alongside Chris Nahon and Pierre Morel. He directed Jet Li in Unleashed, his solo debut feature, a full-length martial arts film (also known as Danny the Dog). Besson then entrusted him with directorial control of Transporter 2, set this time in Miami.

In 2008, as part of a wave of French directors employed in Hollywood, he directed his first big-budget American film, The Incredible Hulk. His next project, a remake of the 1981 Clash of the Titans produced by Warner Bros., was released on 2 April 2010. Leterrier had mentioned that he would like to create a Clash of the Titans franchise, should the latest film prove to be successful. However, in June 2010, Jonathan Liebesman was named as director of the sequel, leaving Leterrier's involvement in future films in doubt.

Leterrier directed the spy comedy film Grimsby (2016), written by, and starring, Sacha Baron Cohen. In March 2015, Deadline Hollywood reported that Leterrier was in talks to direct the shark thriller film In the Deep, for Sony Pictures. However, on 3 June 2015, TheWrap reported that Leterrier had exited the film due to creative differences and the reduction of the previously told budget.

In 2019, Leterrier directed every episode of The Dark Crystal: Age of Resistance for Netflix, a prequel series to The Dark Crystal consisting of ten hour-long episodes.

In May 2022, Leterrier announced that he will be directing Fast X, the tenth installment of the Fast & Furious franchise, replacing series director Justin Lin, who retained producing and writing credits. In April 2023, it was announced Leterrier would direct the eleventh film in the series Fast Forever, which is set to be released in 2028.

== Filmography ==
=== Feature films ===
Director

Year	Title	Notes
2002	The Transporter	Directed with Corey Yuen
2005	Unleashed	
2005	Transporter 2	
2008	The Incredible Hulk	
2010	Clash of the Titans	
2013	Now You See Me	
2016	Grimsby	
2022	The Takedown	
2023	Fast X	Replaced Justin Lin
2026	The Last House	Also producer
TBA	Liminal	Filming

Executive producer

- Wrath of the Titans (2012)
- Now You See Me 2 (2016)

Producer

- Strays (2023)

Acting roles

Year	Title	Role	Notes
2002	Asterix & Obelix: Mission Cleopatra	Ouhécharlis	
2010	Clash of the Titans	Kraken	Uncredited

=== Television ===
Year	Title	Director	Executive producer	Notes
2017	Tycoon	Yes	Yes	9 episodes
2019	The Dark Crystal: Age of Resistance	Yes	Yes	All 10 episodes
2021	Lupin	Yes	No	3 episodes

=== Other credits ===
Year	Title	Role
1992	The Son of the Mekong	Trainee
1997	Alien Resurrection	On-set production assistant
1998	Restons groupés	Second assistant director
1999	The Messenger: The Story of Joan of Arc	Production assistant
2002	Asterix & Obelix: Mission Cleopatra	Second assistant director
2002	The Idol	Second assistant director
2016	Ares	Co-producer
