= The Transporter Refueled =

- Theatrical release poster
- Directed by: Camille Delamarre
- Written by: Adam Cooper; Bill Collage; Luc Besson
- Based on: Characters by: Luc Besson; Robert Mark Kamen
- Produced by: Mark Gao; Luc Besson
- Starring: Ed Skrein; Ray Stevenson; Loan Chabanol; Gabriella Wright; Tatjana Pajković; Yu Wenxia; Radivoje Bukvić; Lenn Kudrjawizki; Anatole Taubman; Noémie Lenoir
- Cinematography: Christophe Collette
- Edited by: Julien Rey
- Music by: Alexandre Azaria
- Production companies: EuropaCorp; TF1 Films Production; Fundamental Films; Belga Films; OCS; TF1; TMC
- Distributed by: EuropaCorp Distribution (France); China Film Group (China)
- Release dates: 9 September 2015 (France); 19 November 2015 (China)
- Running time: 96 minutes
- Countries: China; France
- Language: English
- Budget: $22 million
- Box office: $72.6 million

The Transporter Refueled (French: Le Transporteur: Héritage) is a 2015 action thriller film directed by Camille Delamarre and written by Bill Collage, Adam Cooper, and Luc Besson. It serves as a reboot and the fourth installment in the Transporter film series. It stars Ed Skrein as Frank Martin, alongside Ray Stevenson, Loan Chabanol, Gabriella Wright, Tatjana Pajković, Yu Wenxia, Radivoje Bukvić, Lenn Kudrjawizki, Anatole Taubman, and Noémie Lenoir. In the film, Frank finds himself caught up in a bank heist and kidnapping plot orchestrated by Anna (Chabanol).

A fourth Transporter film was planned to feature original franchise star Jason Statham, who was offered a three film deal with EuropaCorp to produce additional installments. After negotiations with Statham fell through, Skrein was hired and the franchise was rebooted, featuring no returning cast members from the first three films. Principal photography took place in Paris.

The Transporter Refueled was theatrically released on 4 September 2015 in the United States and in France five days later, by EuropaCorp; it is the first Transporter film primarily distributed by EuropaCorp. The film received negative reviews from critics and grossed $72.6 million worldwide.

== Plot ==
In 1995, Russian criminal mobster Arkady Karasov and his associates Leo Imasov and Yuri took over rival gangs' sex trafficking business at the French Riviera. One of the prostitutes is a young Anna and Maïssa. Karasov takes an interest in taking Maïssa with him.

Fifteen years later, Anna arranges to dismantle Karasov's criminal enterprise. Former special forces operative Frank Martin Jr., a skilled chauffeur, transports classified packages and clients in his Audi S8. He picks up Frank Martin Sr., a retired MI6 agent and his father.

Later that night at the Carlton Cannes Hotel, Anna and Qiao kill Karasov's accountant and hide a prostitute's body before escaping. At Frank Jr.'s house, during dinner with his father, Anna calls Frank Jr. for a "transporter" and asks him to meet her at the Hotel Barrière Le Majestic Cannes. The next morning, Karasov and Maïssa find his accountant has been killed, and a prostitute's body wearing a necklace from his group is discovered.

Frank Jr. meets Anna, who tells him to pick her up at the Mediterranean Bank in Monte Carlo, and he agrees. He arrives at the bank and encounters three women, including Qiao and Maria. Suspicious, Frank asks the women to exit the car, but they threaten him with a gun and show him a live video of Frank Sr. being held at gunpoint to force Frank Jr. to cooperate. Frank Jr. manages to evade the police, drives the women to a safe house, and meets with Gina and his father. Anna reveals that Frank Sr. was poisoned and will die if Frank Jr. does not follow their demands, as they have the antidote. Frank Jr. agrees, and Anna tells him they plan to steal anesthetic gas. He finds out that Anna and the women used to be prostitutes for Karasov, with whom he has a shared work history. Meanwhile, Karasov and Maïssa learn that the women have stolen a logbook with a list of Karasov’s associates, causing Karasov to realize that Frank Jr. is involved.

Frank Jr. takes Gina, Qiao, and Anna to Imasov's rave club, where they release gas to incapacitate everyone, including Imasov, and collect his fingerprints to access his bank account, transferring money to Anna. Frank Sr. and Maria then board Yuri's plane to secure his fingerprints before Frank Jr. picks them up. Yuri’s bodyguard shoots Maria, so they rush her to the safehouse. Anna reveals the poison was a ruse, letting Frank Jr. and Sr. leave after the job.

Karasov’s associates questioned him about his past with Frank Jr. and the girls from his group. In response, Karasov kidnaps Frank Sr. and calls Frank Jr., threatening to kill Frank Sr. unless he brings the girls to his yacht. Although Frank Jr. returns to the girls, Gina leaves the group. Frank Jr. then takes the women to Karasov's yacht, where Yuri and Imasov confront Karasov, accusing him of stealing their money. Anna alleges that Karasov had the girls steal their money.

Karasov shows his account to his associates, but Gina manages to sneak aboard the yacht and transfer all the stolen money into her account. After being double-crossed, a shootout erupts, during which Qiao and Maria are killed in the crossfire. Gina retrieves the money before Maïssa shoots her. Just as Maïssa is about to take the money back, Gina strangles her before succumbing to her wound. Frank Jr. confronts Karasov on a cliffside. Anna intervenes, shoots Karasov, and sends his body plunging into the ocean. Anna aims her gun at Frank Jr., but hesitates to shoot. Frank Jr. deduces that Anna had Frank Sr. kidnapped so he would bring girls to the boat. He convinces Anna to abandon her life of revenge, and she drives away.

One month later, Anna distributes the stolen money to the families of her friends and to Frank Jr. and Sr.

== Cast ==
- Ed Skrein as Frank Martin Jr., a former mercenary turned contract driver, known mainly as the Transporter.
- Ray Stevenson as Frank Martin Sr., a retired secret agent and Frank's father
- Loan Chabanol as Anna, one of four runaway sex slaves who wants to take revenge on Karasov for an event 15 years prior to the events of the film.
- Gabriella Wright as Gina, Anna's friend and another one of four runaway sex slaves who set out against Karasov
- Tatjana Pajković as Maria, Anna's friend and another one of four runaway sex slaves
- Yu Wenxia as Qiao, Anna's friend and another one of the four runaway sex slaves
- Radivoje Bukvić as Arkady Karasov, a powerful Russian mobster who kidnapped Frank's father, as well as Frank's former brother-in-arms and was responsible for the event that occurred 15 years prior to the events of the film, which involved Anna and her friends.
- Noémie Lenoir as Maïssa
- Lenn Kudrjawizki as Leo Imasov, the second person on Anna's hitlist for robbing their banks, who host nightclub dance parties.
- Yuri Kolokolnikov as Yuri, a third person on Anna's hitlist for robbing their banks, and he owns a plane.
- Samir Guesmi as Inspector Bectaoui
- Anatole Taubman as Stanislav Turgin

== Production ==
At the 2013 Cannes Film Festival, a new trilogy was announced with EuropaCorp and China's Fundamental Films co-producing and distributing the titles. The films will likely be budgeted between €25 million and €30 million each and at least one will be shot in China. Luc Besson will co-finance, distribute, produce and write all the films. The franchise was rebooted after negotiations with Jason Statham fell through.

EuropaCorp wanted Statham to sign a three contract deal, without revealing the script first. English actor Ed Skrein replaced Statham as Frank Martin in the fourth installment of the series. In March 2015, the title was changed from The Transporter Legacy to The Transporter Refueled.

Principal photography of the film began on 1 August 2014, in Paris, France.

== Release ==
=== Theatrical ===
The film was previously set to be released on 6 March 2015. On 5 November 2014, EuropaCorp moved the film for a 19 June 2015 release. On 1 April 2015, EuropaCorp again moved the film back to a 4 September 2015.

The theme song for the Japanese version is "IGNITION" by SHOKICHI of EXILE.

== Reception ==
=== Box office ===
The Transporter Refueled grossed $16 million in the United States and Canada, and $56.6 million in other territories, for a worldwide total of $72.6 million. Its largest territory was China with US$18.3 million.

In its opening weekend in North America, the film grossed $7.4 million, finishing 4th at the box office. It was also 4th on its opening weekend in China, grossing CN¥69.8 million.

=== Critical response ===
The Transporter Refueled has received negative reviews from critics. On Rotten Tomatoes, the film has an approval rating of 15% based on 104 reviews, with an average rating of 3.8/10. The site's critical consensus reads, "The Transporter Refueled has little to offer beyond a handful of decent action sequences, leaving this reboot's title feeling more like wishful thinking than a restatement of purpose." On Metacritic the film has a weighted average score of 32 out of 100, based on 24 critics, indicating "generally unfavorable reviews". Audiences polled by CinemaScore, gave the film an average grade of "B−" on an A+ to F scale.

IGN awarded it a score of 7.0 out of 10, saying, "The shadow of Jason Statham loomed large over this reboot, but Ed Skrein nails it, meaning the franchise is in safe hands."
