= The Transporter =

2002 film by Louis Leterrier and Corey Yuen

- French theatrical release poster
- Directed by: Louis Leterrier; Corey Yuen (Note: Louis Leterrier directed the majority of the film while Corey Yeun served as fight choreographer. The European release credits Leterrier as "director" and Yeun as "action director". The American release credits Yuen as "director" and Leterrier as "artistic director".)
- Screenplay by: Luc Besson; Robert Mark Kamen
- Produced by: Luc Besson; Stephen Chasman
- Starring: Jason Statham; Shu Qi; François Berléand; Matt Schulze
- Cinematography: Pierre Morel
- Edited by: Nicolas Trembasiewicz
- Music by: Stanley Clarke; Alexandre Azaria
- Production companies: EuropaCorp; TF1 Films Production; Current Entertainment; Canal+
- Distributed by: EuropaCorp Distribution (France); 20th Century Fox (Worldwide)
- Release dates: 2 October 2002 (Los Angeles); 11 October 2002 (United States); 23 October 2002 (France)
- Running time: 92 minutes
- Countries: France; United States
- Language: English
- Budget: $20.5 million
- Box office: $43.9 million

The Transporter (French: Le Transporteur) is a 2002 action film directed by Louis Leterrier and Corey Yuen from a screenplay by Luc Besson and Robert Mark Kamen. An international co-production of France and the United States, it is the first installment in the Transporter film series and stars Jason Statham in the title role, alongside Shu Qi, François Berléand, and Matt Schulze. In the film, Frank Martin, a British mercenary driver living in France, finds himself involved in a human trafficking plot.

The Transporter premiered at the Regency Village Theatre in Los Angeles on October 2, 2002, and was first theatrically released in the United States on October 11, 2002, by 20th Century Fox, in France on 23 October by EuropaCorp, and in the UK on January 17, 2003. It received mixed reviews from critics with praise for its action sequences and Statham's performance. It grossed $43.9 million worldwide and was followed by a sequel, Transporter 2, in 2005.

== Plot ==
Frank Martin, a former highly decorated special operations soldier, is a highly skilled driver for illicit jobs in southern France who follows three strict rules: never change the deal, no names, and never open the package.

In Nice, Frank is hired as the getaway driver for three bank robbers, but they bring a fourth man. Explaining that the extra weight will affect his escape, Frank refuses to drive until the leader kills and abandons one of his men. After evading police in a chase, the leader offers more money to drive to Avignon, but Frank declines; the robbers continue their escape in another car but are later foiled by amateur driving. Police inspector Tarconi pays a visit to Frank's secluded coastal house to question him about his car, seen at the scene, but Frank has disposed of all evidence.

Frank is hired to deliver a package to Darren "Wall Street" Bettencourt. While changing a flat tire, he realizes it contains a person — a bound, gagged woman. She tries to escape, but Frank recaptures her and subdues two police officers who see them. He delivers her as promised, gets paid and accepts another assignment on the spot. Bettencourt instructs him to deliver a briefcase to an address in Grenoble. When he stops for refreshments, a bomb in the briefcase explodes.

A vengeful Frank returns to Wall Street's villa, kills henchmen, and steals one of his cars. He finds "the package" in the back seat, so he takes her to his home, where she tells him that her name is Lai. Wall Street visits a survivor in the hospital and kills him after finding out Frank is alive. Tarconi questions Frank about his car bombing, which he claims was stolen; Lai supports his alibi, saying she's his girlfriend. Wall Street's men attack with missiles and automatic weapons, but Frank and Lai escape through an underwater passage to a safe house, where Lai seduces Frank.

Later, while being questioned at the police station by Tarconi, Lai accesses his computer to find information on Wall Street. She reveals that he is a human trafficker with other Chinese immigrants trapped in shipping containers, and Frank reluctantly agrees to help. They confront Wall Street at his office, where Lai's father, Mr. Kwai, is revealed to be his partner in crime. Tarconi arrives as Wall Street subdues Frank and accuses him of kidnapping Lai, and Frank is arrested.

Frank tells Tarconi that Mr. Kwai and Wall Street are smuggling people. Tarconi opens the cell and hints that Frank should pretend to take him hostage to escape the police. Frank finds a weapons stash at Cassis, then tracks criminals to the Marseille docks. After fighting off thugs at a bus depot, he escapes into the water, steals a car, and chases at dawn before it breaks down. He then hijacks a small airplane and parachutes onto the highway.

After a lengthy fight on the moving trucks, Frank throws Wall Street onto the road, where he is crushed by the wheels, but is held at gunpoint by Kwai. He marches Frank to the edge of a cliff, but Lai shoots her father to save Frank. Tarconi and the police rescue the people from the containers.

== Cast ==
- Jason Statham as Frank Martin
- Shu Qi as Lai Kwai
- François Berléand as Inspector Tarconi
- Matt Schulze as Darren "Wall Street" Bettencourt
- Ric Young as Mr. Kwai
- Adrian Dearnell as Newscaster

== Production ==
In August 2001, it was reported that Luc Besson would produce, finance, and co-write a script with Robert Mark Kamen called The Transporter. It had been written as a vehicle for Jason Statham. Corey Yuen was set to make his English language directorial debut after working as an action director on productions such as Besson's Kiss of the Dragon.

The film was inspired by the short film series The Hire, which was produced as a promotional effort by BMW.

Filming took place in on-location in the South of France: in Nice, Cassis, Saint-Tropez, Marseille, and Cannes. Statham performed most of his own physical and driving stunts. Shu Qi spoke almost no English when she was cast, and had to learn most of her lines phonetically. Director Louis Leterrier originally intended Martin to be gay. This angle was dropped during filming, and a sex scene between Martin and Lai was added.

== Music ==
=== Soundtrack ===
==== Original soundtrack ====
1. Tweet – "Boogie 2Nite"
2. Nate Dogg – "I Got Love"
3. Sacario featuring Angie Martinez and Fat Joe – "Live Big (Remix)"†
4. "Benzino – Rock The Party"†
5. Knoc-Turn'al – "Muzik"
6. Angie Martinez featuring Lil' Mo and Sacario – "If I Could Go!"†
7. Tamia – "Be Alright"†
8. Missy Elliott – "Scream AKA Itchin'"
9. Gerald Levert – "Funny"†
10. Hustlechild – "I'm Cool"†
11. Keith Sweat – "One on One"†
12. Nadia – "Life of a Stranger"

† indicates that the song did not appear in the film

==== Original Motion Picture Score ====
The original score were composed by Stanley Clarke and Alexandre Azaria (for "Love Rescue" and "Transfighter").

1. Stanley Clarke – Mission
2. Stanley Clarke – Serenity
3. Stanley Clarke – Franck Tries to Leave
4. The Replicant – Transfighter
5. DJ Pone & Drixxxé – Fighting Man
6. The Replicant – Love Rescue
7. DJ Pone & Drixxxé – Rockin' and Scratchin'
8. Stanley Clarke – Interrogation with Inspector
9. Stanley Clarke – Gives Package a Drink
10. DJ Pone & Drixxxé – The Chase
11. Stanley Clarke – It's All Over
12. Stanley Clarke – Laï Snoops Around

== Release ==
=== Theatrical ===
The Transporter premiered in 2,573 theaters. With a production budget of $20.5 million, it grossed $25,296,447 in the United States and a total of $43,928,932 worldwide.

=== Censorship ===
The film was cut to receive a PG-13 rating in the United States, and this version was also released in the United Kingdom and several other countries. Japan was the only country besides France to receive the uncut versions. Certain sequences of violence were either cut or toned down for the PG-13 cut. The scenes changed in the American/international release are the fight on the bus, where shots of Frank using a knife against the opponents were edited, and the scene where he throws Wall Street out of the truck; the French release has him crushed under its wheels, whilst the American/international release has him simply thrown out onto the road.

=== Home media ===
The film was released on VHS and DVD on 15 April 2003, and on Blu-ray on 14 November 2006.

== Reception ==
=== Critical response ===
Review aggregation website Rotten Tomatoes gives the film an approval rating of 53% based on 125 reviews, with an average rating of 5.6/10. The site's critics consensus reads: "The Transporter delivers the action at the expense of coherent storytelling." At Metacritic, the film received a weighted average score of 51 out of 100, based on 27 critics, indicating "mixed or average reviews". Audiences polled by CinemaScore gave the film an average grade of "B+" on an A+ to F scale.

Manohla Dargis, of the Los Angeles Times, complimented the action, saying, "[Statham] certainly seems equipped to develop into a mid-weight alternative to Vin Diesel. That's particularly true if he keeps working with director Corey Yuen, a Hong Kong action veteran whose talent for hand-to-hand mayhem is truly something to see." Roger Ebert wrote, "Too much action brings the movie to a dead standstill." Eric Harrison, of the Houston Chronicle, said, "It's junk with a capital J. The sooner you realize that, the more quickly you can settle down to enjoying it."

== Sequel ==
A sequel titled Transporter 2 was released in 2005.
