= Flying Lessons =

Flying Lessons may refer to:

- Flying Lessons (2007 film), a 2007 Italian film starring Giovanna Mezzogiorno
- Flying Lessons (2010 film), a 2010 American film starring Maggie Grace
- Flying Lessons (2024 film), a 2024 American documentary film
- Flying Lessons (album), a 2015 album by Fool's Gold
