= Brick Mansions =

2014 action film by Camille Delamarre

- Theatrical release poster
- Directed by: Camille Delamarre
- Screenplay by: Luc Besson
- Based on: Banlieue 13 by Luc Besson; Bibi Naceri
- Produced by: Luc Besson; Claude Léger; Jonathan Vanger
- Starring: Paul Walker; David Belle; RZA; Goûchy Boy; Catalina Denis; Carlo Rota
- Cinematography: Christophe Collette
- Edited by: Carlo Rizzo; Arthur Tarnowski
- Music by: Trevor Morris
- Production companies: Relativity Media; EuropaCorp; Transfilm International; Canal+; Ciné+; D8; The Movie Network; Brick Mansions Productions
- Distributed by: EuropaCorp Distribution (France); VVS Films (Canada); United International Pictures (Turkey)
- Release dates: April 23, 2014 (France); May 16, 2014 (Turkey); April 25, 2014 (United States and Canada)
- Running time: 91 minutes
- Countries: France; Canada; Turkey; United States
- Languages: English, Chinese
- Budget: $28 million
- Box office: $73.4 million

Brick Mansions is a 2014 action film starring Paul Walker, David Belle, RZA, Goûchy Boy, Catalina Denis and Carlo Rota. The film was directed by Camille Delamarre and written by Luc Besson, Robert Mark Kamen and Bibi Naceri. A co-production between France, Canada and the United States, it is a remake of the 2004 French film District 13, in which Belle had also starred. This movie was released on April 25, 2014, five months after Walker's death on November 30, 2013, and is dedicated to him. This was Walker's last fully completed film before his death and his penultimate film, followed by his final film appearance in Furious 7.

== Plot ==
In 2018, in a crime-ridden dystopian Detroit, a particularly notorious neighborhood has grown so dangerous that law enforcement is overwhelmed. Unable to control the crime, city officials build a 40 ft (12 m)-tall containment wall around this area, known as Brick Mansions, "the projects", or the "no-go zone", to cut it off from the rest of the city. Police monitor all movement in and out of Brick Mansions, and schools and hospitals within it have been shut down.

French-Caribbean ex-convict Lino Duppre is hunted by drug kingpin Tremaine Alexander for stealing and destroying a large amount of heroin. Lino evades capture, and so Tremaine has his men capture Lino's girlfriend, Lola. Lino frees her, and they capture Tremaine and turn him in to police at the border wall. However, the chief of police, who is on Tremaine's payroll, frees Tremaine and arrests Lino instead.

In the meantime, city officials discover that Tremaine has gained hold of a nuclear explosive and a small missile, which he plans to launch into downtown Detroit unless he obtains a ransom. Cop Damien Collier is sent undercover to free Lino so the two can destroy the bomb together. They two escape from a police van and face off against Tremaine and his gang to free Lola and defuse the bomb. Damien discovers that Tremaine never planned to launch it, and that Damien was sent to unknowingly launch the missile into the Brick Mansions to clear the area for upscale development. Damien also finds out his late father was killed by his fellow officers, and the mayor of Detroit was behind both plots. Damien, Lino, and Tremaine confront the mayor and get him to admit his plan while secretly recording his statements. The mayor is arrested. Brick Mansions is welcomed back into the city. Tremaine runs for Mayor of Detroit, promoting the idea of equality and freedom.

== Cast ==
- Paul Walker as Damien
- David Belle as Lino
- RZA as Tremaine
- Gouchy Boy as "K2"
- Catalina Denis as Lola
- Carlo Rota as George "The Greek"
- Ayisha Issa as Rayzah
- Kwasi Songui as Cecil "Big Cecil"
- Robert Maillet as "Yeti"
- Richard Zeman as Reno
- Bruce Ramsay as The Mayor
- Andreas Apergis as Berringer
- Ryan Trudeau as Floyd
- Chimwemwe Miller as The Accountant
- Carolina Bartczak as Nurse Clara
- Ron Lea as Lieutenant

== Production ==
Principal photography began on April 30, 2013, in Montreal. The film was released in 2014 by EuropaCorp. Relativity Media distributed the film. Following Paul Walker's death, the North American release was scheduled for February and French release for April 23. On February 6, 2014, Relativity and EuropaCorp announced a move to April 25, 2014, as a release date for the film, along with paying the cost of the film's world premiere and distribution.

== Release ==
The first official trailer was released on February 13, 2014, featuring the DJ Snake and Lil Jon song "Turn Down for What". The second full trailer was released on March 20, 2014.

== Reception ==
On Rotten Tomatoes, the film has an approval rating of 25% based on 95 reviews, with an average rating of 4.43/10. The website's critics' consensus reads: "Choppily edited and largely bereft of plot, Brick Mansions wastes a likable cast on a pointless remake of the far more entertaining District B13." On Metacritic, the film has a weighted average score of 40 out of 100, based on 28 critics, indicating "mixed or average" reviews. Audiences surveyed by CinemaScore gave the film a grade B+ on scale of A to F.

Critic Jennifer Rodman, considered the film a "watered-down American version, similar in many forms...a huge disappointment". Andrew Pulver wrote in The Guardian, "to be honest, Brick Mansions is not a great film — it kind of skimps on the parkour, the main reason why anyone went to see District 13." Variety's Justin Chang called the film "propulsively entertaining" but was critical of the "aggressive cutting technique" which fails to allow audiences to fully appreciate the stuntwork and movements of the actors. Mick Lasalle of The San Francisco Chronicle wrote, "The movie itself makes that impossible to forget. There are cars all over the movie - car chases, car crashes, crazy driving, a scene of Walker hanging from a speeding car, and even a scene of Walker and another guy going 80 miles an hour when the brakes and the steering give out. Apart from that, there's just the awkwardness of looking at someone on screen and knowing more about him than he knows about himself." Lasalle concluded, "Things start silly and end up laughable and ridiculous." A. O. Scott of The New York Times wrote, "this movie, a remake of the 2004 French franchise-starter District B13, can be enjoyably crazy in its hectic, cartoonish way" but it is also "brawny, dumb and preposterous."

== See also ==
- District 13: Ultimatum
