= Bennigan =

Bennigan may refer to:

- Bennigan's, an Irish pub-themed American casual dining restaurant chain
- Claire Bennigan, character in The Whispers (TV series)
- Drew Bennigan, character in The Whispers (TV series)
- Sean Bennigan, character in The Whispers (TV series)
