= Catalina Denis =

Colombian actress and model

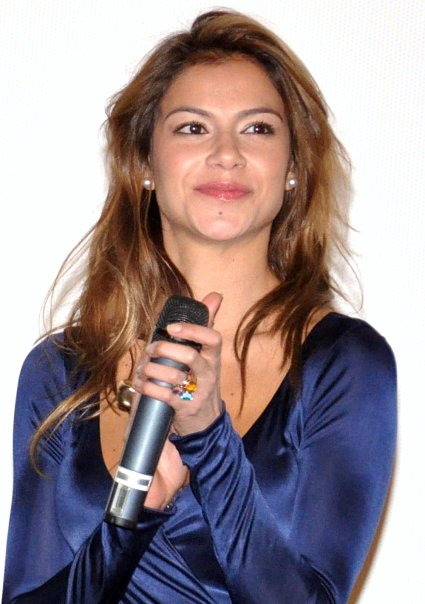
- Catalina Denis in 2010
- Born: Bucaramanga, Colombia
- Other name: Catalina Zarate
- Occupation: Actress/Model
- Years active: 2007–present
- Website: catalinadenis.com

Catalina Zarate Denis is a Colombian actress and model based in France. Denis made her film debut in 2007 with a brief appearance in the French comedy Taxi 4. She played a striptease dancer in the 2010 film Le Mac. Most recently, she plays the butt-kicking girlfriend of David Belle's character in Brick Mansions, the last film Paul Walker completed before his death in 2013. She was also part of the main cast of ABC's new show The Whispers.

== Filmography ==
Year	Title	Role	Director	Notes
2007	Taxi 4	The girl in Smart	Gérard Krawczyk	
2008	Go Fast	Gladys	Olivier Van Hoofstadt	
2010	Coursier	Louise	Hervé Renoh	
2010	Le mac	Luna	Pascal Bourdiaux	
2011	Sleepless Night	Julia	Frédéric Jardin	
2013	Pep's	Audrey Joly	Denis Thybaud	TV series (1 episode)
2013	The Tunnel	Veronica	Dominik Moll & Udayan Prasad	TV series (3 episodes)
2014	Brick Mansions	Lola	Camille Delamarre	
2014	The Assets	Rosario Ames	Trygve Allister Diesen, Peter Medak, ...	TV mini-series
2015	The Whispers	Dr. Maria Benavidez	Mark Romanek, Guillermo Navarro, ...	TV series (7 episodes)
2016	L'Araignée Rouge	Alice Corel	Franck Florino	
2016	Joséphine, ange gardien	Jessica	Denis Thybaud (2)	TV series (1 episode)
