= Cyril Raffaelli =

French martial artist

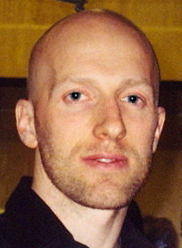
- Raffaelli at the premiere of District 13
- Born: 1 April 1974 (age 51)
- Occupation: Actor
- Years active: 1997–present
- Known for: Parkour, Stunt, Martial arts

Cyril Raffaelli (born 1 April 1974), sometimes credited as Cyril Xavier Cuenel Raffaelli and Cyril Quenel-Raffaelli, is a French traceur, martial artist and stuntman.

== Biography ==
Utilizing shotokan karate and wushu, Raffaelli has been in films with Luc Besson and David Belle, the latter being a friend of his.

=== Acting career ===
Raffaelli starred last in the war-horror film Djinns.

== Championships and accomplishments ==
- IKFF Combat Combiné World Cup (1997) - Winner
- IKFF Combat Combiné bronze medalist (1999)
- 1998 France San da Champion

== Filmography ==
Raffaelli is uncredited in some of his films - here is a partial list:

S No	Film	Year	Role
1	Double Team	1997	
2	Ronin	1998	
3	RPM	1998	
4	The Messenger: The Story of Joan of Arc	1999	Stunts
5	Taxi 2	2000	
6	Mortal Transfer	2001	
7	Brotherhood of the Wolf	2001	
8	Kiss of the Dragon	2001	One of the twins
9	Wasabi	2001	
10	Yamakasi	2001	
11	Asterix & Obelix: Mission Cleopatra	2002	
12	The Transporter	2002	
13	Michel Vaillant	2003	
14	District 13	2004	Damien Tomaso
15	Live Free or Die Hard	2007	Rand on Thomas Gabriel's team
16	The Incredible Hulk	2008	Parkour coordinator
17	District 13: Ultimatum	2009	Damien Tomaso
18	Tekken	2009	Fight choreographer
19	Djinns	2010	Louvier
20	Baby	2015	Fight choreographer
21	A Gentleman	2017	Fight choreographer/played a thug
