= Girls with Balls =

- Film poster
- Directed by: Olivier Afonso
- Written by: Olivier Afonso; Jean-Luc Cano
- Produced by: Jean-Marie Antonini; Jérôme Vidal
- Starring: Guillaume Canet; Denis Lavant; Dany Verissimo-Petit
- Cinematography: Sascha Wernik
- Edited by: Sébastien de Sainte Croix
- Music by: Sacha Chaban
- Distributed by: Netflix
- Release date: September 23, 2018
- Running time: 77 minutes
- Countries: France; Belgium
- Language: French

Girls with Balls is a 2018 comedy horror film directed by Olivier Afonso and written by Olivier Afonso and Jean-Luc Cano.

== Plot ==
Girls with Balls follows the Falcons, a championship volleyball team, which follow a detour home through remote, unknown roads. They come across a bar, where they are challenged with a most dangerous game.

== Cast ==
- Guillaume Canet
- Denis Lavant as Barman
- Dany Verissimo-Petit as Dany
- Tiphaine Daviot as Jeanne
- Manon Azem as Morgane
- Camille Razat as Lise
- Orelsan as Cow-Boy
- Anne-Solenne Hatte as Hazuki
- Tony Corvillo as Borgne
- Louise Blachère as M.A.
- Victor Artus Solaro as Coach (as Artus)
- Alex Moreu Garriga as Moustachu
- Mathieu Madenian
- Margot Dufrene as Tatiana

== Reception ==
On review aggregator website Rotten Tomatoes, the film has an approval rating of 42% based on 12 critics, with an average rating of 4.9/10. The site's consensus states: "While occasionally funny and relentlessly gory, Girls With Balls is neither particularly strong on cheap thrills nor a very remarkable entry to the trash horror genre."

Scott Tobias of Variety wrote "Afonso doesn't push the cartoonish allure far enough into shocks or titillation, and he's not inventive enough to make up for the absence of cheap thrills".

Writing for The Hollywood Reporter, Jordan Mintzer commented "Girls with Balls scores some points for its Z-movie conceits but could have benefited from stronger writing and direction".

According to Kimber Myers of the Los Angeles Times, "This is a deranged nightmare of wildness, as full of laughs as it is arterial sprays".
