= Yamakasi =

Group of parkour practitioners from France

The Yamakasi (Lingala: ya makási) are the original group of l'art du deplacement (parkour) practitioners from Lisses, France.

The nine original members were David Belle, Sébastien Foucan, Châu Belle Dinh, Williams Belle, Yann Hnautra, Laurent Piemontesi, Guylain N'Guba Boyeke, Malik Diouf, and Charles Perriére. Their philosophy was to become an individual who is physically, mentally, and ethically strong. The name has been used in popular references to parkour, including in French films about admirable lawbreakers who do their physically demanding deeds for charitable ends. Members of the original group have continued to appear in video reports on their history and the practice.

== History ==
The development of the Yamakasi is traced back through David Belle to his father Raymond Belle, who was heavily influenced by Georges Hébert's methode naturelle. The group also drew influence from Asian culture and Asian martial arts, including the acrobatic antics of Jackie Chan in his Hong Kong action films, the martial arts philosophy of Bruce Lee, and the martial arts films of Jean-Claude Van Damme. They considered Bruce Lee to be the "unofficial president" of their group.

David initially trained on his own, and after moving to Lisses found other young men (including his cousins) who had similar desires and they began to train together. The group put themselves through challenges that forced them to find physical and mental strength to succeed. Examples included training without food or water, or sleeping on the floor without a blanket, to learn to endure the cold.

The group began calling themselves the Yamakasi - Congolese Lingala ya makási, meaning strong in one's person. They called their activity l'art du déplacement - the art of movement. To join the group, new members had to be recommended by an existing member and then pass tests to evaluate their motivation for joining. The group complemented their training with values and principles shared with all members, such as honesty, respect, humility, sacrifice and hard work.

For example, no one in the group was permitted to be late for training, as it would hold back the whole group. If any member completed a challenge, everyone else had to do the same thing. During their training no one was allowed to be negative or to complain. Few excuses were allowed. For instance, if someone claimed that his shoes were too worn out in order to make a jump, he had to do it anyway, even if it meant doing the jump barefoot. At the same time, everyone was required to have knowledge of their own limits.

Respecting one's health and physical well-being was one of the foundations of the group. If any member hurt himself during or after the execution of a movement, the movement was deemed a failure. A movement executed only once was not considered an achievement; only with repetition was the challenge complete. Every movement had to be repeated at least ten times in a row without the traceur having to push his limits or sustaining any injury. If any mistake was made by any traceur in the group everyone had to start all over again.

Humility was an important principle. No traceur was allowed to feel superior over someone else, for example by executing a movement only to show off in front of someone who could not perform the movement. If any traceur in the group claimed that he had completed a difficult and dangerous challenge that should not be attempted unaided, he had to prove his claims by doing the challenge again. Anyone who lied violated the principle of humility.

Despite the huge emphasis on the collective, each traceur had to progress and develop independently, and there was a complete trust within the group. Every traceur was to encourage the others and show confidence through their behaviour. If a member violated the principles, the group could meet without the offending person to discuss various punishments. Anyone deemed unsuitable could be temporarily or even permanently banned from the group in order to uphold the disciplines, values, and principles. Despite the huge emphasis on the collective and the principles, everyone was trying to find their own way in parkour to fulfill their personal development. The aim of parkour was to create the means to be yourself.

In the late 1990s, after David's brother sent pictures and video to a French TV programme, the popularity of parkour began to increase. A series of television programmes in various countries subsequently featured video footage of the group, and as the popularity increased, they began to get more and more offers. Eventually, the original group split apart to pursue different goals, some staying with the discipline and others leaving. The number of practitioners in total, though, kept increasing, and parkour's popularity began to spread around the globe through television, feature film and increasing use of online video-sharing methods.

== Etymology ==
The word Yamakasi is taken from the Lingala language, which is spoken in the Republic of the Congo and the Democratic Republic of the Congo. Ya makási combines the possessive ya with makási, the plural form of bokási, and can mean strong in body, spirit, or person. The word bokási translates from Lingala to French as pouvoir/puissance, vigueur, force/résistance, vitalité, energie (power, vigour, strength, vitality, energy).

== References in popular culture ==
Several films and documentaries of the Yamakasi have been made - all without David Belle or Sébastien Foucan, who had left after disagreements on the core values of their movement.

In 1998, the Yamakasi were featured alongside graffiti artist Darco in Le Message, a youth-oriented short film produced by Bruno Girard. The characters in the 2001 French film Yamakasi became cat burglars to retrieve the money for a child's heart transplantation. In a 2004 semi-sequel, Les fils du vent, the group moves to Bangkok and gets entangled in a battle between the Yakuza and the triads.

The French documentary Génération Yamakasi, released in 2006, showcased the group's movement and philosophy, and how they passed it on to urban youth. ESPN reported on parkour in 2007, featuring Laurent Piemontesi and Châu Belle Dinh.

== Sources ==
- Angel, Julie (2011). Ciné Parkour. Julie Angel. ISBN 978-0-9569717-1-5.
- Belle, David & Perriére, Charles. PARKOUR – From the origins to the practise.
- Belle, David (2009). Parkour. Intervista. pp. 71–79. ISBN 978-2-35756-025-3.
