= Lockout (film) =

- Theatrical release poster
- Directed by: Stephen Saint Leger; James Mather
- Screenplay by: Stephen Saint Leger; James Mather; Luc Besson
- Story by: Luc Besson
- Based on: Escape from New York by John Carpenter; Nick Castle; Escape from L.A. by John Carpenter; Debra Hill; Kurt Russell
- Produced by: Marc Libert; Leila Smith
- Starring: Guy Pearce; Maggie Grace; Vincent Regan; Joe Gilgun; Lennie James; Peter Stormare
- Cinematography: James Mather
- Edited by: Camille Delamarre; Eamonn Power
- Music by: Alexandre Azaria
- Production companies: EuropaCorp; Canal+; Ciné+
- Distributed by: EuropaCorp
- Release dates: 7 April 2012 (Brussels); 13 April 2012 (North America); 18 April 2012 (France)
- Running time: 95 minutes
- Country: France
- Language: English
- Budget: $20 million
- Box office: $32.2 million

Lockout (also known as MS One: Maximum Security) is a 2012 English-language French science fiction action film directed by James Mather and Stephen Saint Leger from a script written by Mather, Saint Leger, and Luc Besson (with Besson also the executive producer through EuropaCorp). It stars Guy Pearce, Maggie Grace, Vincent Regan, Joe Gilgun, Lennie James and Peter Stormare. The film marks the feature directorial debut for both Mather and Saint Leger. The plot follows Snow (Pearce), a man framed for a crime he did not commit, who is offered his freedom in exchange for rescuing the President's daughter Emilie (Grace) from the orbital prison MS One, which has been taken over by its inmates, led by Alex (Regan) and his psychotic brother Hydell (Gilgun).

Lockout premiered on 7 April 2012 at the Brussels International Festival of Fantasy Film, and was released in North America and France in April 2012. The film received mixed reviews from critics, although Pearce's performance was praised.

== Plot ==
In 2079, CIA operative Snow is arrested for murdering Colonel Frank Armstrong, who had uncovered evidence of a mole selling secrets about the United States space program. Secret Service Director Scott Langral, on advice from the President, has Snow convicted of murder and espionage, despite Snow protesting that he was helping Armstrong discover the mole. Snow is sentenced to thirty years in the maximum security space penitentiary MS One, where prisoners are kept in stasis for the length of their sentences. Snow's friend and fellow agent Harry Shaw tries to locate Snow's contact Mace, who knows where Frank's briefcase containing the stolen secrets is hidden.

Meanwhile, the President's daughter Emilie arrives on MS One to investigate claims that keeping prisoners in stasis can cause them to develop mental instability. The warden allows her to interview Hydell, a deranged prisoner. He manages to escape and releases all of the prisoners, starting a riot led by his brother Alex. Emilie is shot and is captured along with others. Shaw convinces Langral and the President to send Snow to rescue Emilie rather than risk her life in a siege. Snow is initially reluctant to go but agrees after Shaw tells him that Mace is on MS One and could help Snow prove his innocence. Langral initially attempts to trick Alex into releasing Emilie, but Hydell disagrees and kills a hostage negotiator, forcing Snow to infiltrate MS One. Alex realizes that Emilie is the President's daughter, but she escapes with her bodyguard, Hock, and they hide in a secure room. A problem with the oxygen supply forces Hock to commit suicide to buy Emilie more time.

Snow breaks into the secure room and rescues Emilie after administering first aid. Snow then changes Emilie's hair & clothing to conceal her gender, allowing them to walk through the prison population without being noticed. They find Mace, but the stasis has given him dementia and made him incoherent. Snow and Emilie bring Mace with them and attempt to reach the escape pod. With no one at the helm, the prison falls out of orbit and crashes into the International Space Station. The collision causes a hull breach, killing Mace. Snow brings Emilie to the escape pod but discovers it has only one seat. Realizing that he has been sent there to die, he sends Emilie on her way, but she allows the pod to launch without her because she believes the remaining hostages will be killed. Hydell contacts Emilie and threatens the hostages unless she reveals her location; after she does, he kills them anyway.

Snow and Emilie discover evidence that the prisoners were being illegally used as test subjects. Alex finds and captures Emilie; he also shoots Snow, leaving him for dead. Alex learns that Hydell has killed all of the hostages; he contacts the President, threatening to let Hydell and the prisoners rape Emilie if they are not released. The President refuses to allow a siege and risk Emilie, causing Langral to temporarily relieve him of his command. Langral orders the destruction of MS One. Hydell tries to rape Emilie but is stopped by Alex; Hydell kills him, then tries to stab Emilie, but Snow arrives and knocks him out. Snow and Emilie flee from Hydell and the remaining prisoners. Meanwhile, Langral's men attack the prison and manage to plant a bomb to destroy it. Snow and Emilie use space suits and jump from MS One as it detonates. Using their suits, Snow and Emilie re-enter Earth's atmosphere and land safely in New York City, where Snow is arrested.

Emilie later realizes that Mace's incoherent rambling was actually a code revealing the location of Frank's briefcase. Examining the motel room where Frank was killed, Emilie realizes that Langral saw what he believed was Snow shooting Frank on a mirrored door, which only showed part of what happened; in reality, Snow was shooting at the actual assassin at the same time that Frank was shot. In an interrogation room, Snow gives the briefcase to Shaw, who unlocks it but is shocked to find it empty. Snow notes that he had not given Shaw the combination, and Shaw is revealed to be the mole and arrested. Snow is released, and his possessions are returned, including a lighter given to him by Frank before his death. Examining the lighter, Snow finds a memory card containing the real secret information hidden inside. Emilie meets Snow and teases him after discovering his first name is Marion; the pair walk away together.

== Cast ==
- Guy Pearce as Marion Snow:
  A former government agent wrongly convicted of espionage against the United States. After meeting with him for the first time, the directors commented that he was too skinny, but Pearce promised that he would "buff up." Pearce undertook a high-protein diet and weightlifting regimen to increase his muscle mass, as he believed it was important that Snow look like a serious action hero.
- Maggie Grace as Emilie Warnock:
  The daughter of the President of the United States. Grace intended to perform as many of her own stunts as possible, and was required to learn stunt, combat, and wire work before filming began. She was drawn to the role partly because of Besson, with whom she had worked twice previously, and because she saw the character as a "kick-ass" woman. Describing Emilie, Grace said she is a "capable young woman who knows how to negotiate her role as someone in a position of responsibility. She certainly has a strong world compass and she responds amazingly well under pressure. True, she's not exactly trained for the situation she finds herself in, but that's OK. There's still a strength about her in spite of that."
- Joe Gilgun as Hydell:
  Alex's psychotic brother and fellow prisoner.
- Vincent Regan as Alex:
  A prisoner and leader of the prison revolt.
- Lennie James as Harry Shaw:
  A corrupt CIA officer.
- Peter Stormare as Scott Langral:
  The Chief of the Secret Service. Describing what drew him to the role, Stormare commented: "The part was nice because it was like 'Wow, he's eluding me all the time. What is he up to? Is he really a bad guy or a good guy? What side is he on?' You never find out, which is kind of cool."

The cast also includes Nick Hardin as The Hostage Negotiator; Jacky Ido as Hock, Emilie's bodyguard; Tim Plester as Mace, Snow's contact; Mark Tankersley as Barnes, the prison warden; Anne-Solenne Hatte as Kathryn, Emilie's aide and friend; Peter Hudson as President Jeff Warnock, Emilie's father; and Miodrag Stevanovic as Frank Armstrong, a CIA agent.

== Development ==
Principal photography was reported to have begun on 7 September 2010 in Belgrade, Serbia. Much of the filming used green screens, rather than practical sets. The intended scenes were storyboarded in Dublin, Ireland to aid the actors in visualizing how the green screen scenes would appear after the completion of the CGI in post-production. Speaking about the experience, Grace stated: "You just have to suspend the voice in your head because you feel so silly reacting to nothing there. Having whole conversations with people that aren't there. I felt a little crazy the first time around."

Luc Besson produced the film and co-wrote the script with the directors James Mather and Stephen Saint Leger.

FilmDistrict purchased the distribution rights to the film. In December 2011, FilmDistrict reached a deal to distribute its 2012 films, including Lockout, through Open Road Films.

== Release ==
Lockout was released theatrically on 13 April 2012 in North America, and on 18 April 2012 in France.

The film was released on home media (Blu-ray and DVD) on 17 July 2012.

== Reception ==
=== Box office ===
The film grossed US$14,326,864 in the United States and Canada, and US$17,877,166 from other markets for a worldwide total gross of US$32,204,030.

Lockout opened to US$6.23 million from 2,308 theaters in the United States and Canada—an average of US$2,700 per theater—making it the number 9 film for the weekend. Pre-release tracking of the film had estimated that its opening-weekend gross would be between US$6–8 million. The film drew a large male audience, with men making up 65% of those in attendance and an even split between those under and over the age of 25.

=== Critical response ===
On Metacritic the film has a score of 48 out of 100 from 32 critics, indicating "mixed or average" reviews. Rotten Tomatoes gave it a 38% approval rating based on reviews from 123 critics, with an average score of 5 out of 10, and the site's consensus reads: "Guy Pearce does the best he can with what he's given, but Lockout is ultimately too derivative and shallow to build on the many sci-fi thrillers it borrows from." CinemaScore polls reported that the average grade moviegoers gave the film was a "B−" on an A+ to F scale.

Lisa Schwarzbaum of Entertainment Weekly gave the film a C grade, writing: "Lockout floats like space junk in the final frontier." James Rocchi of BoxOffice magazine called the film: "A sleek, slick and shameless rip-off of John Carpenter's Snake Plissken films Escape from New York and Escape from L.A."

== Legal action ==
In 2015, director John Carpenter sued the film's makers in the Tribunal de grande instance de Paris, alleging Lockout plagiarized his films Escape from New York and Escape from L.A.. The French court ruled in his favour and awarded him damages of €20,000, with the Escape from New York screenwriter Nick Castle getting €10,000, and €50,000 given to StudioCanal. After Besson's appeal was rejected in July 2016, the claimant's total damages were increased to €450,000.

== See also ==
- List of films featuring space stations
