= Élodie Yung =

French actress

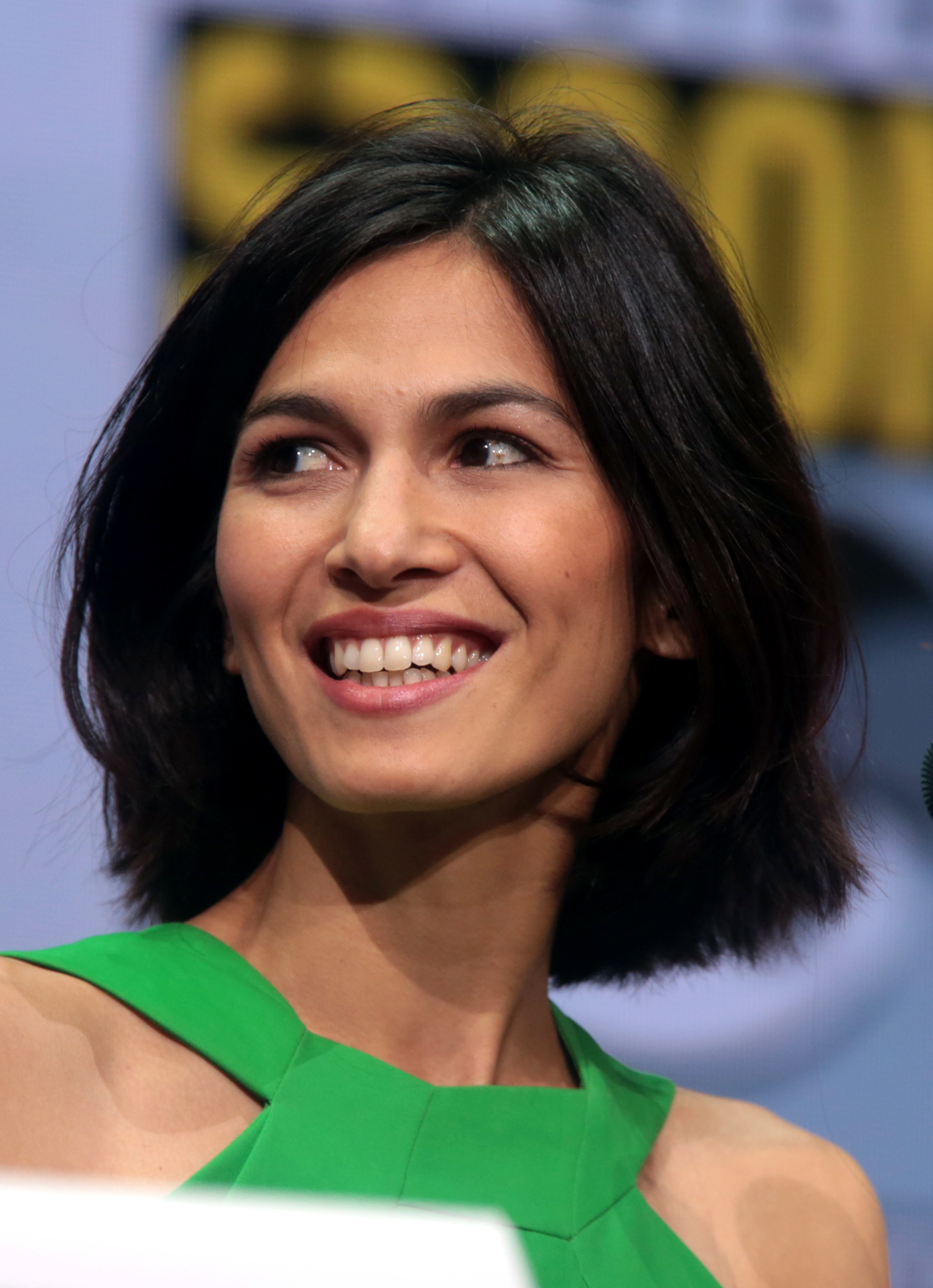
- Yung at the 2017 San Diego Comic-Con
- Born: Paris, France
- Education: University of Paris; London Academy of Music and Dramatic Art
- Occupation: Actress
- Years active: 2002–present
- Children: 1

Élodie Yung (French: [elɔdi juŋ]) is a French actress and director. She is best known for her roles as Elektra Natchios in the Marvel Cinematic Universe (2016–present), as well as Thony De La Rosa on the Fox series The Cleaning Lady (2022–2025).

== Early life ==
Yung's father is Cambodian and her mother is French. She grew up in Seine-Saint-Denis. Her father enrolled her in karate classes at age 9, and she eventually became a black belt in her late teens. Yung earned a law degree at the University of Paris with the intention of becoming a judge. However, she instead pursued acting at the London Academy of Music and Dramatic Art.

== Career ==
Yung began acting in 2002, in the French television series La vie devant nous and made her film debut as the female lead Tsu in 2004's Les fils du vent. She followed this with a performance as gang lord Tao in District 13: Ultimatum.

Yung returned to TV for the first three seasons of the successful police series Les Bleus with Clémentine Célarié.

Yung appeared briefly in the 2011 film The Girl with the Dragon Tattoo as Miriam Wu, a romantic interest of Lisbeth Salander and followed this with roles as the ninja Jinx in 2013's G.I. Joe: Retaliation and Gods of Egypt (2016), as the goddess Hathor. In 2016 she also starred as Amelia Roussel in the action comedy The Hitman's Bodyguard alongside Ryan Reynolds and Samuel L. Jackson.

Yung's breakthrough performance was Elektra Natchios in season 2 of Daredevil in 2016. She reprised the role in 2017 in The Defenders. In 2020, Yung played the role of Catherine in the Disney+ film Secret Society of Second-Born Royals.

In 2022, Yung began starring as Thony in the Fox crime drama series The Cleaning Lady. Yung headlined the show through four seasons until its cancellation in June 2025. She also directed an episode.

== Personal life ==
In August 2018, Yung gave birth to a daughter with actor Jonathan Howard.

== Filmography ==
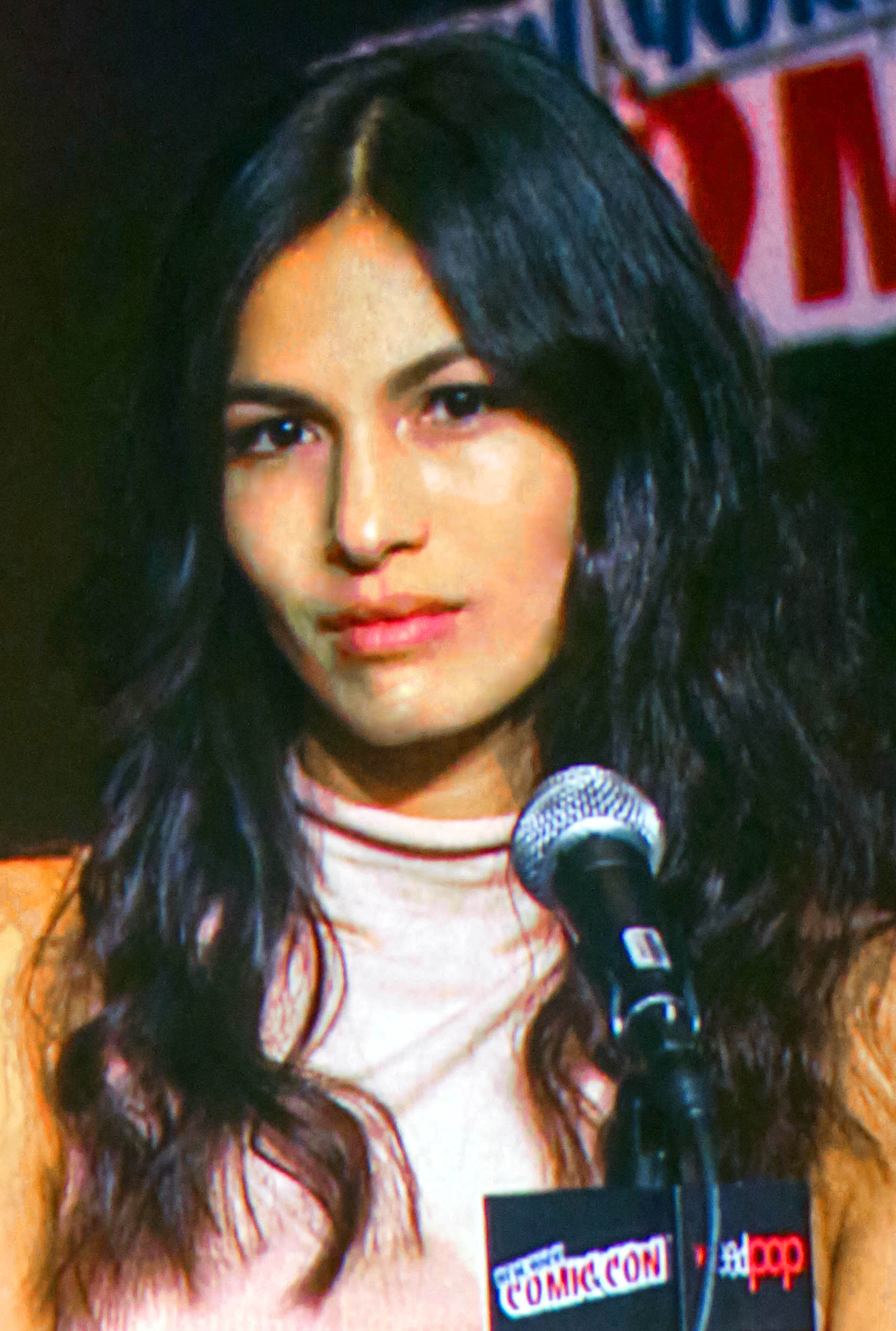
Yung at New York Comic Con 2015

=== Film ===
Year	Title	Role	Notes
2004	Les fils du vent	Tsu	
2007	Fragile(s)	Isa	
2008	Home Sweet Home	Marie-Jo	
2009	District 13: Ultimatum	Tao	
2010	Opération Casablanca	Isako	
2010	Let Her	The woman	Short film
2011	The Girl with the Dragon Tattoo	Miriam Wu	
2013	G.I. Joe: Retaliation	Kim Arashikage / Jinx	
2014	10 Things I Hate About Life		Unfinished and unreleased
2014	Still	Christina	
2014	Believe	Murray's Wife	Short film
2015	Narcopolis	Eva Gray	
2016	Gods of Egypt	Hathor	
2017	The Hitman's Bodyguard	Amelia Roussel	
2020	Secret Society of Second-Born Royals	Queen Catherine	
2025	Worth the Wait	Amanda	

=== Television ===
Year	Title	Role	Notes
2002–2003	La vie devant nous	Jade Perrin	Recurring cast; 30 episodes
2005–2007	Mademoiselle Joubert	Fanny Ledoin	3 episodes
2006–2010	Les Bleus	Laura Maurier	Main cast; 29 episodes
2007	Sécurité intérieure	Joséphine	3 episodes
2009	Little Wenzhou	Su	TV movie
2016	Of Kings and Prophets	Rizpah	1 episode
2016	Daredevil	Elektra Natchios / The Black Sky	Main cast; 10 episodes
2017	The Defenders	Elektra Natchios / The Black Sky	Main cast; 8 episodes
2021–2022	Love, Death & Robots	Alice, Chantra (voice/motion capture)	2 episodes
2022–2025	The Cleaning Lady	Thony De La Rosa	Main cast; 44 episodes
2024	Secret Level	The Gamemaster (voice)	Episode: "Unreal Tournament: Xan"
2027	Daredevil: Born Again	Elektra Natchios	Season 3; Post-production

=== Video games ===
Year	Title	Voice role	Notes
2017	Call of Duty: WWII	Olivia Durant	
