= Rogue City =

2020 French film

- Promotional poster
- French: Bronx
- Directed by: Olivier Marchal
- Written by: Olivier Marchal
- Produced by: Adrian Politowski; Sidonie Dumas
- Starring: Lannick Gautry; Stanislas Merhar; Kaaris; David Belle
- Music by: Erwann Kermorvant
- Production companies: Gaumont; Umedia; uFund
- Distributed by: Netflix
- Release date: October 30, 2020
- Running time: 116 minutes
- Country: France
- Language: French (Note: With some dialogue in Corsican and European Spanish.)
- Budget: $13 million

Rogue City (French: Bronx) is a 2020 French crime film directed and written by Olivier Marchal and starring Lannick Gautry, Stanislas Merhar, David Belle and Kaaris. It was released on Netflix on 30 October 2020. Set in Marseille, it is about an anti-gang police unit that is investigating a mass shooting at a nightclub, amidst tension from an internal affairs investigation for their unorthodox methods, friction with the rival narcotics unit, rumors of corruption, and threats from gang leaders.

== Plot ==
When a heavily armed Marseille anti-gang squad led by Richard Vronski escorts gang patriarch Paul Maranzano between prisons, he asks to visit his wife in the hospital, who has terminal cancer. At her request, Maranzano suffocates her with a pillow to end her suffering. He thanks Vronski for his help.

A gang organised by the drug smuggling Corsican family the Bastianis does a mass shooting at an open-air bar, targeting a rival gang, led by Nadal, killing nine attendees. One of the attacking gang members, Rizzo, is knocked down by gunfire (stopped by his bulletproof vest), and cannot escape in the getaway car. He hides his machine gun and bulletproof vest in a dumpster and blends in with the victims. Given his gang connections, he is brought in to the police station for questioning. During Detective Costa's interview with Rizzo, we learn that Costa has been working for the Bastianis and had alerted them to Nadal's plan to visit the bar. He fakes a fight with Rizzo, murders him and plants his service gun in Rizzo's hand.

Detective Willy Kapellian, whose marriage is failing, is regularly drinking excessively. One night, he gets drunk and drives away with a female officer, who is the new Police Chief, Leonetti's daughter, only to get shot at by gang members (he does not see their identity). It is police protocol to take a blood sample after a shooting incident. Fearing that Will will lose his job and go to jail for drunk driving, Captain Richard Vronski volunteers to take the blood test in his place. When Leonetti learns of Vronski's action, he suspends him.

In an attempt to rehabilitate themselves, Vronski's anti-gang unit use confiscated gang guns to mount an unsanctioned ambush of the Bastiani drug gang that is doing a major drug shipment and sale of cocaine at a creek near Marseille. Vronski was tipped off by Maranzano. But Nadal, who is also tipped off about the shipment by the corrupt cop, Costa, apparently on Leonetti's instructions, arrives to hijack the shipment. Unbeknownst to the anti-gang unit, an undercover narcotics agent was embedded in the Spanish drug smugglers delivering the cocaine, and he is killed in the four-way shootout between the Bastianis, Nadal, Vronski’s men and the Spanish smugglers. As Nadal flees, the police take and hide the money.

After incriminating evidence is found against Will, implicating him in the shooting of the undercover narcotics officer, he massacres his own family before turning his gun on himself. Meanwhile, Nadal murders Costa and his wife, blaming Costa for setting him up. Leonetti’s daughter, who is the newest member of Vronski’s unit, discovers Costa’s diary with details of payments from the Bastianis. She hands the diary to Vronski.

The Narcotics Bureau Special Ops chief Stephan Jakowitz suspects Vronski and his men of being involved in the ambush and even confronts Vronski with his suspicion. To get out of the mess he finds himself in, Vronski strikes a deal with the Bastianis in which he and his unit’s men agree to shoot their rival, Nadal and his associates. After killing them, Vronski plants the gun which killed the undercover narc on them. Leonetti, the police chief, who had been blackmailed by the Bastianis and whose incriminating dossier is handed over to Vronski as part of the deal, then closes the case, blaming the Nadal gang for the Marseille creek shootout.

Vronski quits the police force and sails off with half the money, leaving the other half for the two surviving members of his unit, Zach and Max.

The anti-gang unit's members are being murdered one by one, including Vronski. Also killed are police chief Leonetti and the Bastiani gang matriarch. It is revealed that all of these killings were ordered by the head of the Narcotics Bureau’s Special Ops chief in a larger plot to take-over both gangs, indicating deep-rooted corruption and betrayal within the police force itself. The film ends with him watching the impending murder of Leonetti’s daughter.

== Cast ==
- Lannick Gautry as Richard Vronski, Captain of the Anti-Gang Unit
- Stanislas Merhar as Willy Kapellian, Detective on the Anti-Gang Unit
- Kaaris as Max Beaumont, a Detective on the Anti-Gang Unit
- David Belle as Zach Damato, a Detective on the Anti-Gang Unit
- Patrick Catalifo as Anti-gang Unit Leader Georges Campana
- Jean Reno as Ange Leonetti, Police Chief
- Moussa Maaskri as Mario Costa, Detective of the Narcotics Squad
- Claudia Cardinale as Corsican crime matriarch Catarina Bastiani
- Catherine Marchal as Katia de Vrindt
- Francis Renaud as Franck Nadal
- Erika Sainte as Zoé Vronski, wife of Captain Vronski
- Ambre Pietri as Sacha Kapellian, wife of Detective Kapellian
- Jeanne Bournaud as Hélène Litvak, a police doctor
- Barbara Opsomer as Manon Leonetti
- Gérard Lanvin as Clan boss Paul Maranzano
- Eriq Ebouaney as Stephan Jankovic
- Alain Figlarz as Santu, a Corsican mobster
- Jean-Pierre Sanchez as Rizzo, à member of the Bastiani gang

== Production ==
The film was announced in May 2019, with Jean Reno, Lannick Gautry, Stanislas Merhar, and David Belle joining the cast. Filming took place that September in the south of France.

== Release ==
Rogue City was digitally released by Netflix on October 30, 2020. In its debut weekend, it was the second most-streamed film on the site.

=== Critical response ===
Elisabeth Vincentelli of The New York Times acknowledges that "Marchal’s movie [is] radical in its nihilism", as it depicts a "bleak vision" of "corruption [as] pervasive" and inescapable. Despite this positive comment, she says that overall, the film is an "ineffectual muddle", noting that "[v]iolent, law-defying cops would be a tough sell at any time, but Rogue City is oblivious to the changed context" on dirty cops, who "don't hold much romantic allure nowadays."

John Serba from Decider gave the film a negative review, calling it a "muddy and grim", "two-hour slog". While he praised the lighting on this "[i]nstant cop thriller", he lost patience with its "cast of relentless scowlers, ever-shifting loyalties, lack of any real characters and general cynicism for the state of the human soul".

Reviewer Roger Moore calls it "[c]onvoluted, bloody and downbeat" and says that the film has "so many characters, intrigues and competing agendas" that it is "hard to follow". Moore says that characters other than Vronski are "barely sketched in" and he states that "writer-director Marchal loses track of characters, story threads, mob cash and drugs, impatient as he is to get to the next shoot out."
