= Malice in Wonderland (2009 film) =

- 'Malice In Wonderland DVD cover
- Directed by: Simon Fellows
- Written by: Jayson Rothwell
- Produced by: Carola Ash; Nicole Carmen-Davis; Claus Clausen; Larry Collins; Stephen Margolis; Albert Martinez Martin; Charles Salmon; Glenn M. Stewart; Mark Williams
- Starring: Maggie Grace; Danny Dyer; Matt King; Nathaniel Parker
- Cinematography: Christopher Ross
- Edited by: Justin Krish
- Music by: Christian Henson; Joe Henson
- Distributed by: Sony Pictures Home Entertainment
- Release dates: 1 October 2009 (Sitges); 5 February 2010 (United Kingdom)
- Running time: 87 minutes
- Country: United Kingdom
- Language: English

Malice in Wonderland is a 2009 British fantasy adventure film directed by Simon Fellows and written by Jayson Rothwell. It is roughly based on Lewis Carroll's 1865 novel Alice's Adventures in Wonderland.

The film was released on DVD in the UK on 8 February 2010.

== Plot ==
A modern take on the famous story by Lewis Carroll, it is about a university student (Maggie Grace) who is knocked over by a black cab in Central London. When she wakes up, she has amnesia, lost in a world that is a long way from home—Wonderland. She is dragged through a surreal, frightening underworld filled with bizarre individuals and low-lifes, by the cab driver, Whitey (Danny Dyer). Confused, she tries to find out who she is, where she is from, and use what wits she has left to get back home.

== Cast and characters ==
- Maggie Grace as Alice
- Danny Dyer as Whitey
- Nathaniel Parker as Harry Hunt
- Matt King as Gonzo
- Pam Ferris as The Duchess
- Bronagh Gallagher as Hattie
- Anthony Higgins as Rex
- Paul Kaye as Caterpillar
- Gary Beadle as Felix Chester
- Lin Blakley as Mrs. Jones
- Christian Patterson as Dean/Dom
- Garrick Hagon as Louis Dodgson

== Critical reception ==
Malice in Wonderland received negative reviews from critics. On Rotten Tomatoes, the film has a rating of 10%, based on 10 reviews, with an average rating of 4/10.
