= Maggie Grace =

American actress (born 1983)

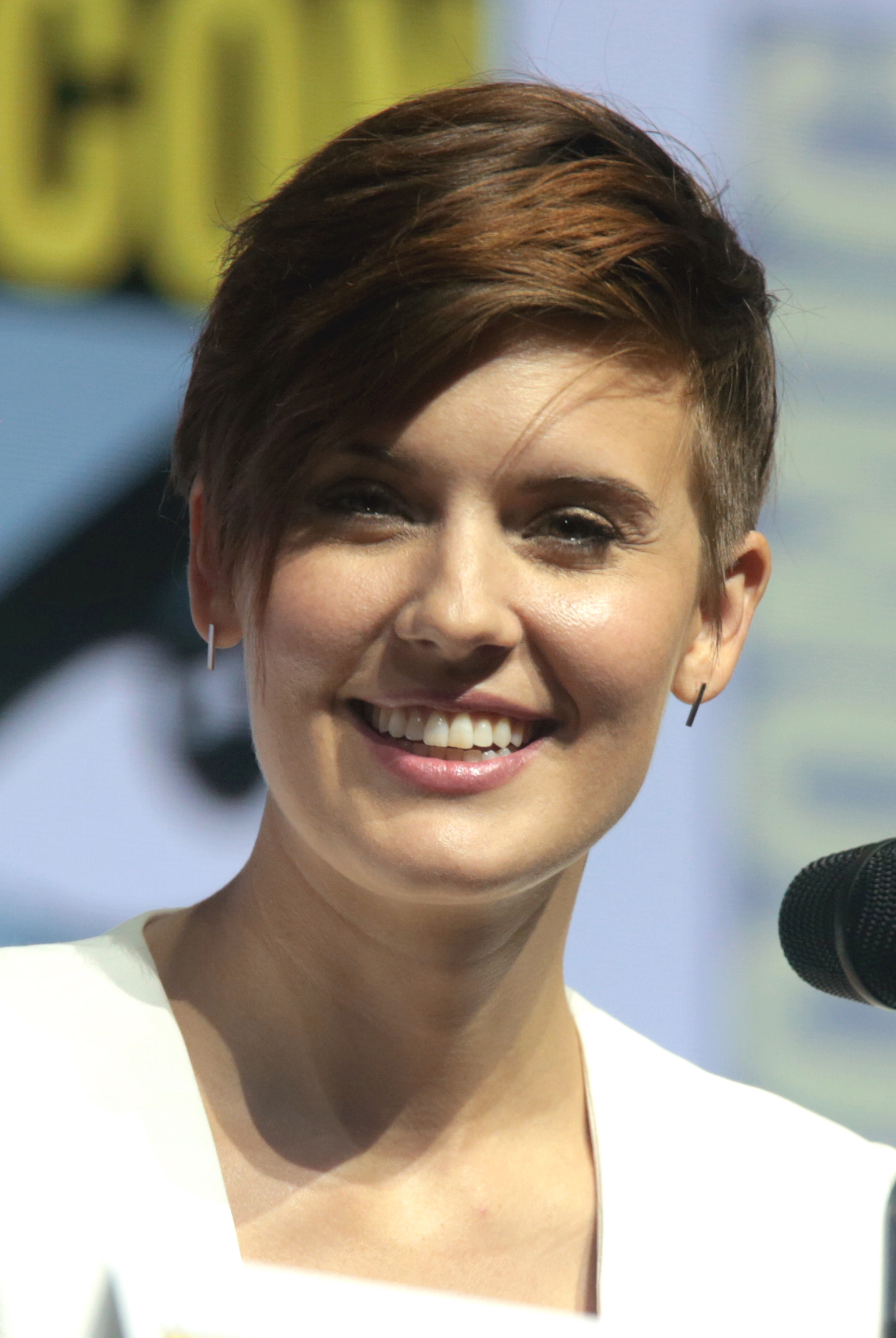
- Grace in 2018
- Born: Margaret Grace Denig; September 21, 1983 (age 43); Worthington, Ohio, U.S.
- Occupation: Actress
- Years active: 2001–present
- Spouse: Brent Bushnell (m. 2017; div. 2025)
- Children: 2

Margaret Grace Denig (born September 21, 1983) is an American actress. Grace earned a Young Artist Award nomination in 2002 with her portrayal of 15-year-old murder victim Martha Moxley in the television movie Murder in Greenwich. In 2004, she was cast as Shannon Rutherford in the television series Lost, on which she was a main cast member for the first two seasons, winning a Screen Actors Guild Award shared with the ensemble cast. Leaving the series, Grace was keen to work more prominently in film. She appeared in The Jane Austen Book Club (2007), and as Kim Mills in Taken in 2008. She reprised the role of Kim in Taken 2 (2012) and Taken 3 (2014).

She played the lead role, Alice, in Malice in Wonderland, a modern take on Lewis Carroll's novel Alice's Adventures in Wonderland. Grace reprised the role of Shannon in two more episodes of Lost, including the series finale. In 2013, she appeared in the sixth season of Californication as Faith, a groupie and a muse to the stars, who captures the eye of Hank Moody, played by David Duchovny. In 2018, she joined the cast of the series Fear the Walking Dead as journalist Althea Szewczyk-Przygocki.

== Early life ==
Margaret Grace Denig was born in Worthington, Ohio, to Valinn (née Everett) and Fred Denig, who ran a family jewelry business. She attended Worthington Christian Schools from kindergarten through ninth grade and briefly attended Thomas Worthington High School, where she began acting in school plays and community theater, including a 2000 Gallery Players production of The Crucible, at a local Jewish Community Center. As a child, Grace was a voracious reader and a self-described "Shakespeare nerd" telling the Los Angeles Times that at age 13, she "was really into Jane Austen, kind of like how some kids are into Star Trek".

== Career ==
Grace acquired an agent within a week of relocating to Los Angeles and enrolled in acting classes. She landed her first role in Rachel's Room, a 2001 web-based video series about the affairs inside a teenage girl's bedroom that was created by Dawson's Creek executive producer Paul Stupin. Her next role was on the 2002 television series Septuplets, which was cancelled before the first episode had aired. Her breakout role was on 2002's television movie Murder in Greenwich, based on the true story of 15-year-old Martha Moxley's murder. She was nominated for a Young Artist Award for her portrayal of Moxley in the Best Performance in a TV Movie, Miniseries or Special – Leading Young Actress category. She went on to feature in minor roles on the television series CSI: Miami, The Lyon's Den, Miracles, Like Family, Cold Case and Law & Order: Special Victims Unit, and the films Twelve Mile Road and Creature Unknown.

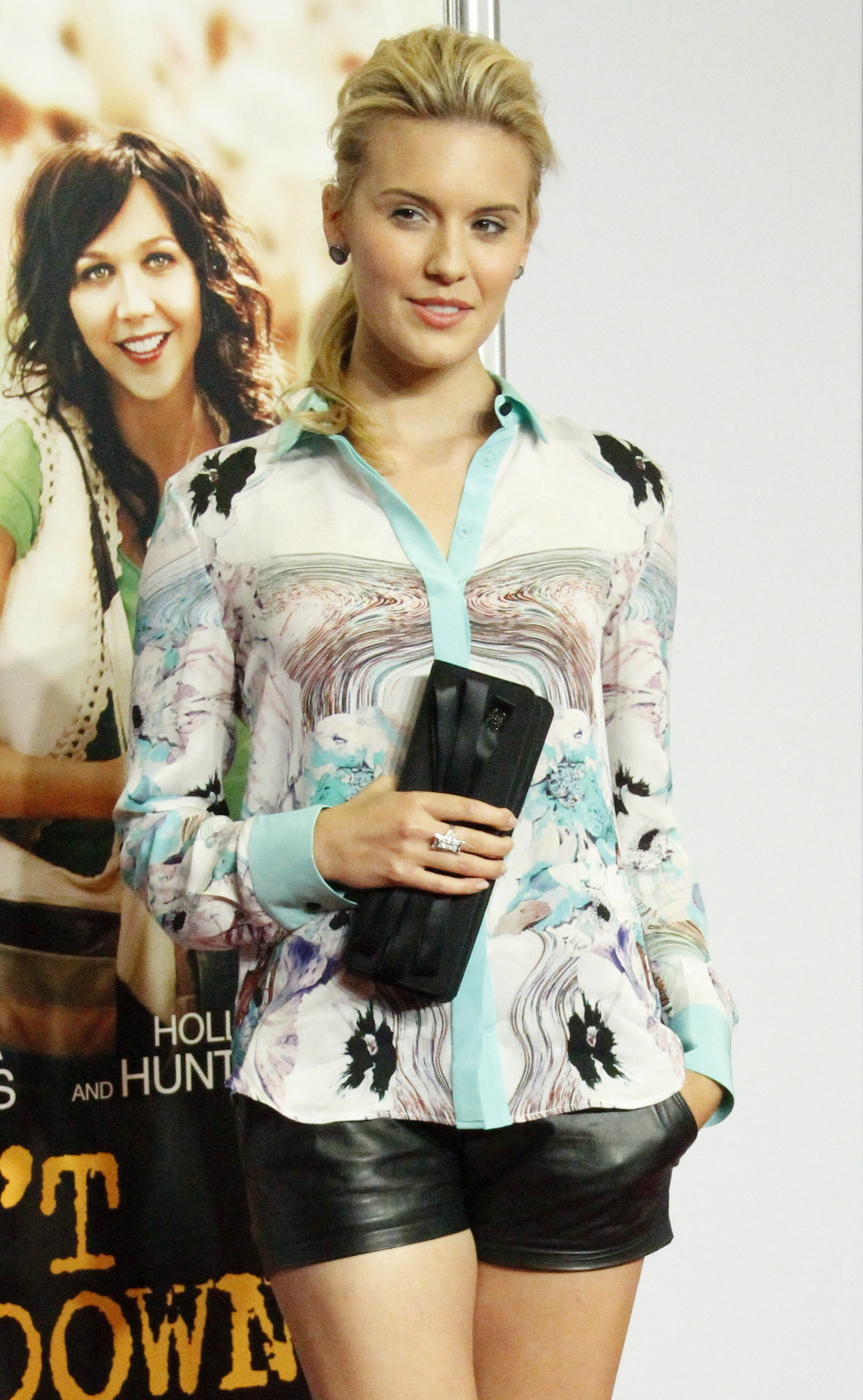
Grace at the New York premiere of Won't Back Down in September 2012

In mid-2004, Grace's agent sent her the script for the pilot episode of Lost; she was given the role of Shannon Rutherford after a successful audition. She was nominated in 2005 for a Teen Choice Award for Choice TV Breakout Performance – Female for her role on Lost. She lived in Hawaii during the filming of the show's first season, and signed on to star in The Fog, a 2005 remake of the 1980 horror film, as a character originally played by Jamie Lee Curtis. Though the filming of Lost was supposed to have ended before The Fog began, the productions coincided due to Lost's extended season finale and Grace flew between the two sets, on the Hawaiian island of Oahu and on Bowen Island in British Columbia.

After ranking at #27 on Maxim's Hot 100 list of 2005, she returned for Lost's second season. Her character was killed in the season's eighth episode, "Collision", when the series' writers began to feel that the character's "story avenues [were] limited". Executive producer Carlton Cuse said that Grace's departure from the show was "sort of a win-win" as she was eager to enter a full-time career in film. After leaving the series, she nevertheless joined the other principal Lost cast members of season 2 onstage at the 12th Screen Actors Guild Awards where Lost won the award for Outstanding Performance by an Ensemble in a Drama Series.

Variety reported in May 2005 that Grace was in negotiations to play X-Men character Kitty Pryde in the 2006 film X-Men: The Last Stand, but in July, auditions were reportedly being held for her replacement. The role ultimately went to Elliot Page, and Grace later revealed that she had never been contacted about the role and was surprised to read that she was up for the part in question. Grace's next role was in the 2007 independent film Suburban Girl. In 2007, she starred in The Jane Austen Book Club, based on Karen Joy Fowler's novel of the same name. She is a fan of Jane Austen and had read Fowler's novel when it was released in 2004. When she was given the film's script, she met with the director Robin Swicord, with whom she says she "geeked out", and was given the role of Allegra, an openly lesbian 20-year-old.

After the filming of The Jane Austen Book Club was completed, Grace briefly returned to Hawaii to shoot a guest spot on the Lost season 3 episode "Exposé". She starred in the 2008 thriller film Taken with Liam Neeson, who was at the top of a list of male actors Grace wished to work with that she had written just two months before she was cast. She played the lead in Simon Fellows' 2009 Malice in Wonderland, a modern adaptation of Lewis Carroll's Alice's Adventures in Wonderland. In 2010, Grace starred in the drama Flying Lessons, and appeared in James Mangold's film Knight and Day, as well as in Faster. Grace's busy schedule prevented her from returning as Shannon in "LA X", the season premiere for Lost's sixth and final season, but she did return for the series finale "The End". In September 2010, it was revealed that Grace was chosen to play Irina in The Twilight Saga: Breaking Dawn Part 1 and Part 2.

In December 2012, it was announced Grace would be making her Broadway debut in Picnic. The play opened for previews on December 14, running at the American Airlines Theatre.

She also made her first appearance as a guest star in the Showtime Series Californication in January 2013, in which she plays a groupie and muse to the rock and roll world as well as the personal interest of Hank Moody.

In 2018, she joined the cast of Fear the Walking Dead as Althea, a journalist.

== Personal life and public image ==
While still working on Lost, Grace and Ian Somerhalder adopted a feral cat named Roo which they found "literally dying" in the jungle on the set. She said that the cat is now her "travel buddy." In February 2017, Grace became engaged to Brent Bushnell, the CEO of an entertainment company. They were married on May 28, 2017. The couple's first child, a son, was born in 2020. The couple's second child, a daughter, was born in 2023. The couple divorced in 2025.

Grace often credits her mother as her source of inspiration. When asked about her closest friend, she said that she and her mother were more like sisters and that she is "lucky to have an exceptionally cool mom." She is a self-proclaimed Anglophile, having written to a pen pal in the Lake District from the age of eight and admiring a number of English poets, including William Shakespeare; she first visited England when she was thirteen. She calls herself very clumsy, claiming to "trip over my legs all the time", and was jokingly nicknamed "Maggie Graceless" by one of her former castmates.

Grace has been on the covers of many international fashion magazines, including Saturday Night, Femme Fatales, Vanidades, 7x7 and Organic Spa Magazine; Canada's Glow and Viva; UK's CosmoGirl; Brazil's Caras; France's Télé 7 Jours; Singapore's Solitaire and Russia's Cosmopolitan Beauty.

== Filmography ==
=== Film ===
Year	Title	Role	Notes
2002	Shop Club		
2004	Creature Unknown	Amanda	
2005	The Fog	Elizabeth Williams	
2007	The Jane Austen Book Club	Allegra	
2007	Suburban Girl	Chloe	
2008	Taken	Kim Mills	
2009	Malice in Wonderland	Alice	
2010	The Experiment	Bay	
2010	Faster	Lily	
2010	Flying Lessons	Sophie Conway	
2010	Knight and Day	April Havens	
2011	The Twilight Saga: Breaking Dawn – Part 1	Irina	
2012	Decoding Annie Parker	Sarah	
2012	Lockout	Emilie Warnock	
2012	Taken 2	Kim Mills	
2012	The Twilight Saga: Breaking Dawn – Part 2	Irina	
2014	About Alex	Siri	
2014	Taken 3	Kim Mills	
2014	We'll Never Have Paris	Kelsey	
2015	Unity	Narrator	Documentary
2016	The Choice	Stephanie Parker	
2016	Showing Roots	Violet	
2017	Aftermath	Christina	
2017	The Scent of Rain and Lightning	Laurie	
2018	The Hurricane Heist	Casey Corbyn	
2018	Supercon	Allison McNealy	
2020	Love, Weddings & Other Disasters	Jessie	
2023	The Secret Art of Human Flight	Wendy	
2024	Blackwater Lane	Rachel	
2025	O Horizon	Evan	
2026	The Girl in the River	Amelia Pembrock	

=== Television ===
Year	Title	Role	Notes
2002	Murder in Greenwich	Martha Moxley	Television film
2002	Septuplets	Hope Wilde	Unknown episodes
2003	CSI: Miami	Amy Gorman	Episode: "Spring Break"
2003	The Lyon's Den	Haley Dugan	Episode: "Beach House"
2003	Miracles	Hannah Cottrell	Episode: "Mother's Daughter"
2003	Twelve Mile Road	Dulcie Landis	Television film
2004	Cold Case	Renee	Episode: "Volunteers"
2004	Law & Order: Special Victims Unit	Jessie Dawning	Episode: "Obscene"
2004	Like Family	Mary	Episode: "My Two Moms"
2004	Oliver Beene	Elke	Recurring
2004–2006; 2010	Lost	Shannon Rutherford	Main role (seasons 1–2); special guest (seasons 3, 6)
2013	Californication	Faith	Recurring role (season 6)
2013	The Following	Sarah Fuller	Episode: "Pilot"
2013	Susanna	Susanna	Main role (season 1)
2013	When Calls the Heart	Aunt Elizabeth	Television film
2015	Masters of Sex	Christine Wesh	Episode: "Three's a Crowd"
2018–2021	Fear the Walking Dead	Althea Szewczyk-Przygocki	Main role (seasons 4–6); guest (season 7)
2019	The Althea Tapes	Althea Szewczyk-Przygocki	Main role
2025	Suits LA	Amanda Stevens	Recurring role
