= Tony D'Amario =

French actor (1960–2005)

- Born: 10 July 1960; Paris, France
- Died: 29 June 2005 (aged 44)
- Citizenship: France
- Years active: 1999–2005
- Known for: Banlieue 13

Antoine Philippe d'Amario, real name of Tony D'Amario (10 July 1960 in Paris – 29 June 2005 in Issy-les-Moulineaux) was a French actor best known for his role as K2 in Banlieue 13.

He made his film debut in 1999, with a small role in The Messenger: The Story of Joan of Arc. He followed this with a string of small film roles throughout the early 2000s, and appeared in an episode of the long-running crime series Central nuit in 2003. His most notable film role came in the 2004 film Banlieue 13, in which he portrayed one of the main antagonists. After this he appeared in an episode of Le Tuteur. D'Amario died of an aneurysm that led to a heart attack on 29 June 2005, while filming Last Hour, which is his only international film and released posthumously in 2008.

== Filmography ==
Year	Title	Role	Notes
1999	The Messenger: The Story of Joan of Arc	Compiegne's Mayor	
2001	La Vérité si je mens ! 2	Charly Journo	
2001	Les Morsures de l'aube	Le malabar du roi Raoul	
2001	Tanguy	Dur n°1	
2002	A+ Pollux	Un compagnon de cellule	
2002	Aram	Alaatin	
2003	Corps à corps	Client Moon Side	
2003	Lovely Rita, sainte patronne des cas désespérés	Roro	
2004	Banlieue 13	K2	
2008	Last Hour	Casino	Final film role. Posthumous release
