= District 13 =

2004 French action film by Pierre Morel

District B13
- French poster
- Directed by: Pierre Morel
- Written by: Luc Besson; Bibi Naceri
- Produced by: Luc Besson
- Starring: David Belle; Cyril Raffaelli; Tony D'Amario; Larbi Naceri; Dany Verissimo
- Cinematography: Manuel Teran
- Edited by: Frédéric Thoraval
- Music by: Da Octopusss
- Production companies: EuropaCorp; TF1 Films Production
- Distributed by: EuropaCorp
- Release date: 10 November 2004 (France)
- Running time: 86 minutes
- Country: France
- Language: French
- Budget: €13 million
- Box office: $9.6–$11.6 million

District B13 (French title Banlieue 13 or B13), is a 2004 French action film directed by Pierre Morel, produced by Luc Besson, and written by Besson and Bibi Naceri. It depicts parkour in several action sequences, which was completed without wires or CGI, leading critics to draw comparisons to the Thai film Ong-Bak: The Thai Warrior. David Belle plays Leïto, the story's main character. This is the final film of Tony D'Amario, who plays K2, before his death in 2005.

== Plot ==
In 2010, social problems have overrun the poorer suburbs of Paris. Especially Banlieue 13, commonly referred to as B13: a ghetto with a population of two million people. Unable to control B13, the authorities surround the entire area with a high wall topped by barbed tape, forcing the inhabitants within to survive without education, proper utilities or police protection. Police checkpoints stop anybody going in or out. Three years later, the district has become overrun with gangs. Leïto is a fighter of such gangs, who disposes of a case of drugs down a drain, then escapes the gang led by K2, an enforcer who has come to collect the drugs.

The gang's leader, a ruthless man named Taha Ben Mahmoud, is angered and executes three of K2's men until K2 suggests they kidnap Leïto's sister Lola in retaliation. Lola is captured by K2 at a supermarket. Leïto is able to rescue her and take Taha to the police station, but the police chief in charge betrays and arrests Leïto, saying they are leaving the district and are not willing to stand up to the gangs. Taha leaves with Lola. Despite the chief saying sorry, Leito is angered by the excuses and kills the chief out of frustration by breaking his neck.

Six months later, Damien Tomaso, an undercover officer, completes a successful operation at an underground casino in Paris (led by Carlos Montoya), single-handedly taking down or gunning down the casino's guards and arresting the pit boss. His next assignment is briefed by Krüger, a government official. Taha's gang has taken a bomb from a nuclear transport vehicle and accidentally activated it, giving it 24 hours before it wipes out the district. Posing as a prisoner, Damien infiltrates the district to disarm the bomb. Leïto immediately sees through Damien's cover, but the two reluctantly team up to save Leïto's sister as well. The pair surrenders to Taha in order to gain access to his base, where they find the bomb has been set up on a missile launcher aimed at Paris, with Lola handcuffed to it.

Taha demands a high ransom to deactivate the bomb; the government refuses. After Damien gives them Taha's bank account codes, they drain his funds. Leïto and Damien escape. K2 and his men soon realize that with Taha unable to pay them, they are free from his grasp. Taha attempts to command K2 as a last resort, but K2, fed up with Taha's brutality, turns his back on his former boss and allows his men to gun down Taha. K2 takes over the gang and goes to find Leito and Damien. After a foot chase, K2 catches up with Leito and Damien but calls a truce and allows Leito and Damien to disarm the bomb.

Leito and Damien reach the bomb but are forced to fight a large man named Yeti who was planted by Taha to guard the bomb. After they defeat Yeti, Damien calls Krüger to receive the deactivation code. After hearing Krüger ask if the "bomb is in the exact spot" and recognizing "B13" in the code's last characters, Leïto deduces that the government has framed them, and the code will actually detonate the bomb instead of deactivating it. Damien refuses to believe that the government has set him up, and he fights Leito as Damien truly believes that he is doing the right thing to disarm the bomb, but Lola is able to restrain Damien long enough for the timer on the bomb to run out.

The bomb does not explode, proving Leïto right. K2 and his gang allow Leito and Damien to leave the district. The pair return to the government building with the bomb and use it to force Krüger to admit that he had planned to blow up B13 as a means to end its existence, catching it on camera and broadcasting nationally. Soon, the rest of the government promises to tear down the containment wall and bring back schools and police to B13. Leïto and Damien depart as friends, and Lola kisses Damien, encouraging him to visit B13.

== Cast ==
- David Belle as Leïto
- Cyril Raffaelli as Damien Tomaso
- Tony D'Amario as K2
- Dany Verissimo as Lola
- Larbi Naceri as Taha Ben Mahmoud (sometimes credited as Bibi Naceri)
- Marc Andreoni as Carlos Montoya
- François Chattot as Krüger
- Nicolas Woirion as Corsini
- Patrick Olivier as The Colonel
- Samir Guesmi as Jamel
- Jeff Rudom as Yeti
- Lyes Salem as Samy

== Reception ==
District 13 received mostly positive reviews outside France. On Rotten Tomatoes, it has a rating of 81% based on 113 reviews. The website's critical consensus reads, "A nonstop thrill ride, District B13's dizzying action sequences more than make up for any expository flaws." On Metacritic, it has a weighted average score of 70 out of 100 based on reviews from 28 critics, indicating "generally favorable" reviews.

In France, reviews were slightly less positive. The main issues discussed by the French critics were the similarity with both Escape from New York and Ong Bak, and the shallowness of the plot. Lisa Nesselson of Variety noted the comparison, but said, although the narrative is derivative it "rarely feels that way thanks to bullet pacing, nifty choreography and a few well-placed rejoinders" and also called it "fast, dumb fun". Nathan Lee of The New York Times said that the director "hasn't reinvented this particular wheel, but he gets it spinning with delirious savoir-faire."

Several other critics also praised the film's action scenes and stunt work. Frank Scheck of The Hollywood Reporter wrote: "By most standards, District B13 is a fairly routine summer action movie, albeit one in French. But what makes it unique are the truly amazing and kinetic action scenes featuring Parkour pioneer Belle and co-star Cyril Raffaelli." Wesley Morris of The Boston Globe remarked, "Like its stunt work, the movie is both ridiculously hyperactive and a muscular feat of absolute confidence. I don't expect to have a more adrenalizing time at the movies this summer."

== Sequel ==
Filming of a sequel, originally titled Banlieue 14, began in August 2008 in Belgrade, Serbia, and continued until October 2008. David Belle and Cyril Raffaelli both reprised their original roles of Leito and Damien, respectively. Again, Luc Besson produced the film and wrote the screenplay. The title for the sequel was officially changed to District 13: Ultimatum in the post-production stages. It was released in France on February 18, 2009, and the UK on October 2, 2009.

== Remake ==
Brick Mansions is an English-language remake of the film. Set in Detroit, it began pre-production in 2010 by EuropaCorp. Released in April 2014, it stars Paul Walker as Damien, with David Belle reprising his role from the original and rapper RZA as the gang leader. It is the final film completed by Walker before his death in November 2013.
