= Anne-Solenne Hatte =

French journalist

Anne-Solenne Hatte is a film actress of French and Vietnamese parentage.

== Filmography ==
=== Film ===
- Girls with Balls (2018)
- Lockout (2012)
- Callback (2010)
- Ocean's Twelve (2004)
- Alborada (2022)

=== TV ===
- Duval et Moretti (2008)
- Hard (2008)
- Strike Back: Legacy (2015)

== See also ==
- Lockout
