= Les fils du vent =

Le fils du vent
- DVD cover
- Directed by: Julien Seri
- Written by: Julien Seri; Bruno Guiblet; Philippe Lyon; Charles Perrière
- Produced by: Yves Marmion
- Starring: Charles Perrière; Élodie Yung
- Cinematography: Michel Taburiaux
- Edited by: Maryline Monthieux
- Music by: Christian Henson
- Distributed by: Manga Entertainment
- Release date: 2004
- Running time: 90 minutes
- Country: France
- Language: French
- Budget: $19 million
- Box office: $3.2 million

Les fils du vent ("The Sons of the Wind", also known as The Great Challenge and Sons of the Wind: Bangkok Ninjas) is a 2004 French action film featuring the Yamakasi. It is a semi-sequel to the Luc Besson–produced 2001 film Yamakasi.

== Plot ==
Six parkour adepts (the Yamakasi without Châu Belle Dinh) open a gym in Bangkok. When the new gym starts to attract the area's kids, a local gang feels challenged. Their Eurasian leader Kien (Châu Belle Dinh) attacks the foreigners while they are training on a scaffold. The groups battle until police arrive; both groups barely escape. Logan (Charles Perrière) runs into Kien's only sibling, his sister Tsu (Élodie Yung). Logan and Tsu feel a mutual attraction.

Following the fight the group splits up. Only Léo (Laurent Piemontesi) and Yaguy (Guylain N'Guba-Boyeke) still stick to the plan of establishing the gym, and Léo overcomes the prejudice of antisemitism against him. Williams (played by Williams Belle) departs to visit his grandfather in an abbey. Lukas (Yann Hnautra) wants to return home to fix his marriage. Kenjee (Malik Diouf) attends a local Muay Thai school. Logan is preoccupied with Tsu.

Tsu is tired of being a criminal. She is anxious that either the Triads or the Yakuza will eventually kill her and her brother. But her brother Kien is determined to get back at the Triad that refused them because of their French mother. He and his gang believe they can have a future only by serving the Yakuza. Their contact to the Yakuza is Kitano (Santi Sudaros), the Japanese son-in-law of Triad boss Wong (Burt Kwouk).

Kitano has convinced his father-in-law that he had broken up with his Yakuza family, but Wong still doesn't trust him. Kitano commissions Kien to kidnap Wong's little son. Tsu objects to this and saves the heir by disclosing Kitano's double game to Wong. In revenge, Kitano abducts Tsu and blackmails Kien to turn himself in to the Yakuza. Kien is ordered to a derelict industrial premises.

Logan, Kenjee, Yann, Yaguy, Léo and Williams arrive on time to free Tsu. But when they do, Wong appears with a great many Triad members and confronts the Yakuza. Logan, Tsu, Kien, and the other traceurs find themselves in the middle of a ferocious battle that they must fight their way out of.

== Cast ==
- Châu Belle Dinh as Kien
- Charles Perrière as Logan
- Guylain N'Guba Boyeke as Yaguy
- Laurent Piemontesi as Léo
- Malik Diouf as Kenjee
- Williams Belle as Williams
- Yann Hnautra as Lucas
- Élodie Yung as Tsu
- Santi Sudaros as Kitano
- Burt Kwouk as Wong

== DVD release ==
The film was released for English-speaking countries in 2006 and under a different title (The Great Challenge) again in 2010.
