= Last Hour =

- Directed by: Pascal Caubet
- Written by: Pascal Caubet; Maxime Lemaitre
- Produced by: DMX; Pascal Caubet
- Starring: DMX; Michael Madsen; Kobe; David Carradine; Bettina Antoni; Mónica Cruz; Tommy Wong; Tony D'Amario; Steven Eng; Paul Sorvino
- Cinematography: Ting Wo Kwong
- Edited by: Vincent Zuffranieri
- Music by: DMX
- Distributed by: Brand New Films
- Release date: April 15, 2008
- Running time: 95 minutes
- Country: United States
- Language: English

Last Hour is a 2008 straight-to-DVD American crime drama film starring DMX, Michael Madsen, David Carradine and Paul Sorvino. The film was very poorly received.

== Plot ==
The film follows five characters who are lured to an abandoned house in China by letters sent to them by a dead man. Trapped with a deadly threat and surrounded by the police, the five are forced to confront their pasts to survive.

== Cast ==
- DMX as Jack "Black Jack"
- Michael Madsen as Monk
- David Carradine as Detective Mike Stone
- Paul Sorvino as Maitre Steinfeld
- Kwong Leung Wong as Shang (Tommy Wong)
- Morgan Benoit as Young FBI Agent
- Tony D'Amario as "Casino"
- Mónica Cruz as Detective Rosa Mulero
- Karl Eiselen as Ron Stanax (Karl Eiselan)
- Pascal Caubet as "Poker" (Kobe)
- Steven Eng as Detective Huang
- Krystyna Ferentz as "Poison" (Bettina Antoni)

== Reception ==
Home Media Magazine wrote that the film tried too hard to offer something for everyone.

The Lexikon des internationalen Films said: “A hopelessly poorly pieced together film without a hint of a comprehensible story.”

Another negative review stated: "There is no way that this is a finished movie. No Way. I have to believe that this film either ran out of loot, or was in litigation and the producers had to get some money back somehow, someway and thus padded this garbage with scenes that would have normally been deleted in order to make it to a decent length. Easily one of the worst movies I’ve ever seen, ever.”
