= Dany Verissimo =

French actress

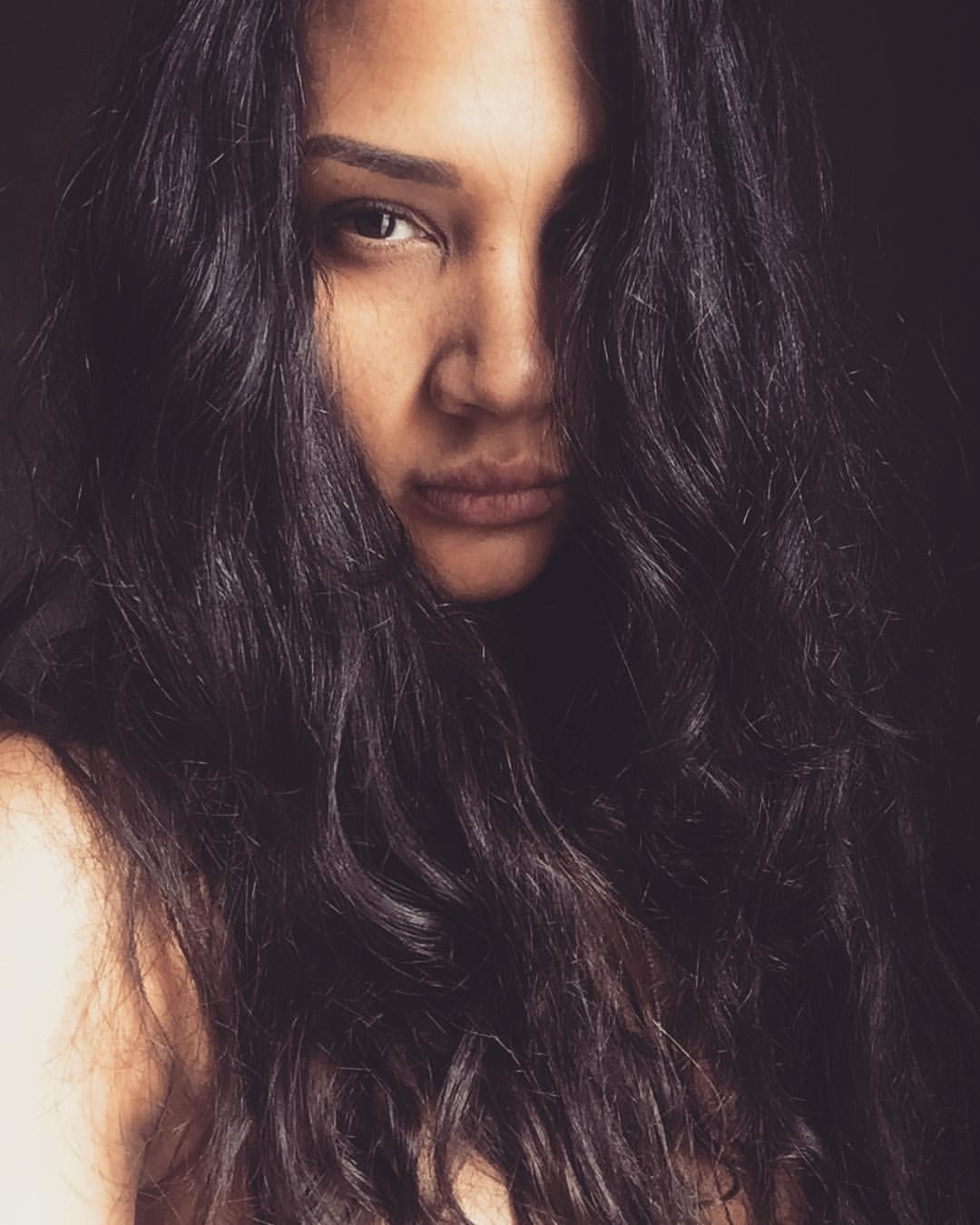
- Dany Verissimo in 2017
- Born: Vitry-sur-Seine, France
- Other names: Dany Verissimo-Petit; Ally Mac Tyana; Ally Verissimo
- Occupations: Actress; model
- Years active: 2001–present
- Height: 1.60 m (5 ft 3 in)
- Spouse(s): Rodolphe Verissimo (10 November 2001 – 29 March 2005) (divorced)

Dany Verissimo is a French actress and model. She originally worked from 2001 to 2002 as a pornographic actress under the stage name Ally Mac Tyana before starting a mainstream career. She also uses the name Dany Verissimo-Petit.

== Early life ==
The child of a Malagasy mother and a French father who separated before her birth, Verissimo spent her childhood in France, the United States, and Nigeria. In France, she lived in Vitry-sur-Seine. Verissimo attended a boarding school.

== Career ==
=== Adult ===
She started appearing in pornographic films at the age of 18. She later explained that she had tried to become an actress but, failing to land roles, had considered working in softcore erotica. She then made the acquaintance of adult film director John B. Root who convinced her that due to her unusual looks she would find more success in pornography.

At the time, she used the stage name Ally Mac Tyana, which was a play on Ally McBeal and her second name, Malalatiana. She worked in the French porn industry from 2001 to 2002, with all of her adult pictures either directed or produced by Root.

=== Mainstream productions ===
In 2002 Verissimo had her first non-erotic film role, as an extra in So Long Mister Monroe and she made an appearance on an episode of the French police drama Brigade des mineurs. In 2004, she was cast as Lola in the film District 13 (Banlieue 13), produced by Luc Besson.

In 2006, she appeared in 'ELLE's "Cannes Special Edition". That same year, she was cast in the film Gradiva, directed by Alain Robbe-Grillet. The film was shown out of competition at the 63rd Venice International Film Festival.

Verissimo played a recurring role in the TV series Maison Close, broadcast on Canal+ from 2010 to 2013.

Her 2013 performance in the play D.A.F. Marquis de Sade, based on the life of the legendary writer and directed by Nicolas Briançon, won critical accolades.

She starred in the 2009 comedy drama film Shot List, written and directed by Joe LiTrenta, as Chicken, her first English-language role.

== Personal life ==
Verissimo speaks French and English.

She gave birth to her first child in 2003.

== Filmography ==
=== Film ===
- 2002 : So Long Mister Monore, by Éric Dahan (cameo)
- 2002 : The Red Siren, by Olivier Megaton (cameo)
- 2004 : District 13 (Banlieue 13), by Pierre Morel
- 2006 : Gradiva, by Alain Robbe-Grillet
- 2008 : Les Princes de la nuit, by Patrick Levy
- 2008 : Finding, by The Salto Brothers (short; also associate producer)
- 2009 : Shot List, by Joe LiTrenta
- 2011 : La Planque, by Akim Isker
- 2012 : Emprise, by Vincent Arnaud (short)
- 2013 : En pays cannibale, by Alexandre Villeret
- 2016 : Par tous les seins, by Caroline Le Moing (short)
- 2017 : Girls with Balls, by Olivier Afonso

=== Television ===
- 2002 : Brigade des mineurs, one episode
- 2006 : Section de recherches, season one, one episode
- 2009 : La Taupe 2, by Vincenzo Marano
- 2010 : Boulevard du Palais, season twelve, one episode
- 2010-2013 : Maison Close, recurring role, two seasons
- 2011 : Julie Lescaut, season twenty, one episode
- 2016 : Section de recherches, season ten, one episode
- 2016 : Le juge est une femme, season fourteen, one episode
- 2017 : The Bureau (Le Bureau des légendes), season three, one episode
- 2025 : The Wheel of Time, season three, one episode
