= Christian Henson =

British composer

- Occupation: Composer
- Parent(s): Nicky Henson; Una Stubbs

Christian Henson is a British composer, primarily working on television and film soundtracks. He has also soundtracked video games, and is the co-founder of Spitfire Audio with fellow composer Paul Thomson. Henson has been nominated for a BAFTA and an Ivor Novello Award for his music.

== Early life ==
Henson is the eldest son of actors Una Stubbs and Nicky Henson. His half-brother Keaton Henson is also a composer. His uncle was the farmer and television presenter Joe Henson and Adam Henson is his cousin. His great-uncle was the cricketer Geoffrey Howard. His great-great-grandfather was Sir Ebenezer Howard, founder of the garden city movement and the first garden cities Letchworth and Welwyn Garden City. His paternal grandfather was the English actor and comedian Leslie Henson, who was perhaps best known for founding the Entertainments National Service Association (ENSA) during the Second World War.

As a child, Henson acted in the 1980 film Never Never Land. After attending Holland Park Comprehensive in the 1980s, Henson worked for three years as a baker, with a home studio that he used in his spare time. He suffered a brain haemorrhage at 25, gave up his bakery job and moved into music and voiceover producing and engineering full time, as well as making music for porn videos.

== Composing ==
In the early 1990s, Henson worked on drum and bass and breakbeat music with acts such as LTJ Bukem and the Freestylers.

From 1997 to 2001, he worked as an assistant for composers Anne Dudley, Harry Gregson-Williams, Rupert Gregson-Williams and Patrick Doyle. Henson cannot read music, and taught himself how to orchestrate soundtracks.

In 2002, Henson made an arrangement of The Allman Brothers Band instrumental "Jessica" for BBC motoring show Top Gear, his arrangement stayed as the show's main theme until it was cancelled in 2022.

== Awards and nominations ==
Henson gained a 2007 Ivor Novello Awards nomination for 'Best Original Movie Score' for his work on the 2006 film Severance. He received 2004 World Soundtrack Awards "Soundtrack Composer of the Year" and "Discovery of the Year" nominations for Les fils du vent.

Henson was nominated, along with fellow composers Jerry Goldsmith and The Flight (his brother Joe Henson and Alexis Smith), for a BAFTA for the music of the Alien: Isolation video game in 2015.

== Spitfire Audio ==
Henson founded the British music technology company Spitfire Audio with fellow composer Paul Thomson in 2007. The company is a producer of musical "virtual instruments", and has collaborated with noted film composer Hans Zimmer, as well as Chad Smith of the Red Hot Chili Peppers, Olafur Arnalds, Roger Taylor of Queen, Eric Whitacre, and most recently with the BBC Symphony Orchestra. In 2018, Henson launched a website called Pianobook, dedicated to creating and sharing sampled instruments for free. It is run by a small group of volunteers, but anyone could share and use sounds, for free.

On 24 February 2023, Henson announced that he would be stepping away from Spitfire Audio following backlash to a tweet supporting Graham Linehan and J. K. Rowling. It was posted on his personal Twitter account, which he temporarily deactivated afterward. He then resigned from his position as a director of Spitfire Music Limited, Spitfire Audio UK Limited, and Spitfire Audio Holdings Limited.

== Crow Hill Company ==
In October 2023, Henson founded a new company called The Crow Hill Company.

== Personal life ==
Henson is married to Scottish singer and songwriter Dot Allison. They live in Edinburgh, Scotland.

== Selected works ==
=== Films ===
- 2002 Cybermutt
- 2002 Biggie & Tupac
- 2004 Chasing Liberty
- 2004 Les fils du vent
- 2005 Animal
- 2006 Severance
- 2006 Opal Dream
- 2006 It's a Boy Girl Thing
- 2007 Scorpion
- 2008 Miss Conception
- 2008 Summer Heat
- 2008 The Secret of Moonacre
- 2008 A Bunch of Amateurs
- 2009 Pandemic
- 2009 Triangle
- 2009 Malice in Wonderland
- 2010 Black Death
- 2010 The Round Up
- 2010 Huge
- 2011 Chalet Girl
- 2011 The Devil's Double
- 2011 Wild Bill
- 2011 Up There
- 2011 Hysteria
- 2012 Grabbers
- 2012 Storage 24
- 2013 Trap for Cinderella
- 2013 Believe
- 2013 Soulmate
- 2014 Terroir
- 2014 Robot Overlords
- 2015 The Go-Between
- 2016 Tommy's Honour
- 2022 This Is Christmas
- 2023 Unwelcome
- 2024 Dune: Part Two
- 2025 Bank of Dave 2: The Loan Ranger

=== Television ===
- 2001–2011 Two Pints of Lager and a Packet of Crisps
- 2002–2004 Top Gear. Dickey Betts (arr. by Christian Henson)
- 2002 SAS: Are You Tough Enough?
- 2002 Scream Team
- 2002 Full Metal Challenge
- 2003 Wreck Detectives
- 2005 Diameter of the Bomb
- 2008 Lost in Austen
- 2009–2013 Poirot
- 2009 Richard Hammond's Blast Lab
- 2011–2016 Fresh Meat
- 2011 Kidnap and Ransom
- 2012 Sinbad
- 2014–2024 Inside No. 9
- 2016 Wolfblood
- 2016 Tutankhamun
- 2018 Trauma
- 2018 Urban Myths
- 2019 Home
- 2026 Ann Droid

=== Video games ===
- 2008 Zubo
- 2013 Assassin's Creed IV: Black Flag
- 2014 Alien: Isolation
