= The Whispers (TV series) =

- Genre: Science fiction; Thriller; Drama
- Based on: "Zero Hour" by Ray Bradbury
- Developed by: Soo Hugh
- Starring: Lily Rabe; Barry Sloane; Milo Ventimiglia; Kristen Connolly; Derek Webster; Catalina Denis; Kylie Rogers; Kyle Harrison Breitkopf
- Composer: Robert Duncan
- Country of origin: United States
- Original language: English
- No. of seasons: 1
- No. of episodes: 13

Production
- Executive producers: Justin Falvey; Darryl Frank; Zack Estrin; Steven Spielberg
- Camera setup: Single-camera
- Running time: 42 minutes
- Production companies: Clickety-Clack Productions; Amblin Television; ABC Studios

Original release
- Network: ABC
- Release: June 1 – August 31, 2015

The Whispers is an American science fiction drama television series created and co-executive produced by Soo Hugh with executive producers Steven Spielberg, Justin Falvey, Darryl Frank and Dawn Olmstead for ABC Studios. It is based loosely on the 1951 Ray Bradbury short story "Zero Hour" from The Illustrated Man. The pilot episode was ordered to series on May 8, 2014, and debuted on ABC on June 1, 2015. On October 19, 2015, ABC canceled the series after one season.

== Premise ==
A series of accidents occurs around children who all communicate with the same invisible and seemingly imaginary friend called Drill. They secretly play his "games" in return for rewards that Drill promises. Claire Bennigan, an FBI child specialist, investigates and finds connections not only between the different children's cases, including her own son, but also to her missing husband.

== Cast ==
=== Main ===
- Lily Rabe as Special Agent Claire Bennigan, an FBI child specialist who investigates a series events connected to an invisible entity named "Drill" – an alien that only communicates with children. She is Sean's wife, Henry's mother and Wes' former lover.
- Milo Ventimiglia as Captain Sean Bennigan, a U.S. Air Force pilot believed to have died in a plane crash, who resurfaces as the target of a citywide manhunt when he is found to be under Drill's influence. He is Claire's estranged husband and Henry's father.
- Kyle Harrison Breitkopf as Henry Bennigan, Claire and Sean's young son, who becomes a friend of Drill and player of his game after Drill cures his deafness and brings his father back to him.
- Barry Sloane as Wes Lawrence, a high-ranking Defense Department operative with close ties to the President and the various corridors of power. Wes is the head of Special Projects Division at the DOD, previously working as assistant director of the FBI. Wes is Lena's estranged husband, Minx's father and Claire's former lover.
- Kristen Connolly as Lena Lawrence, Wes' estranged wife and Minx's mother, who is left vulnerable and unmoored when she discovers Drill is turning her own daughter against her.
- Derek Webster as Special Agent Jessup Rollins, a freshly divorced and deeply rigid FBI agent and Claire's new partner. He is reluctant and skeptical regarding the investigation into Drill, although he later faces the truth.
- Catalina Denis as Dr. Maria Benavidez, a doctor caught up in the investigation of Drill after Sean takes her hostage.
- Kylie Rogers as Millicent "Minx" Lawrence, Wes and Lena's young daughter, who becomes a friend of Drill and player of his game.

=== Recurring ===
- David Andrews as Haley Frommer, the Secretary of Defense and Wes' boss, who aspires to the presidency.
- Dee Wallace as Willie Starling, Claire's mother and Henry's grandmother.
- Alan Ruck as Alex Myers, executive director of the FBI, Claire and Jessup's boss and Wes' former superior.
- Jamison Jones as Harrison Weil, Amanda's husband and Harper's father, Harrison is an important nuclear scientist who is head of the Nuclear Regulatory Commission.
- Autumn Reeser as Amanda Weil, Harrison's wife and Harper's mother, Amanda is involved in a serious accident caused by Drill, the resulting investigation beginning the events of the series.
- Abby Ryder Fortson as Harper Weil, Harrison and Amanda's young daughter who is a friend of Drill and player of his "game", and is the first player identified by the FBI after her mother's accident.
- Alison Araya as Callie, Lena's friend during her troubles with Wes.
- Catherine Lough Haggquist as Renee, Wes' secretary at the DOD.
- Arien Boey as Lucas, a boy who is a friend of Drill and player of his game.
- Maeve Dudley as Jane, a nine-year-old girl who is a friend of Drill and player of his game.
- Terrell Ransom Jr. as Ethan, Renee's son who is a friend of Drill and player of his game.
- Gwynyth Walsh as Dr. Catherine Tully, a renowned outer space expert recruited by the government to work on the investigation into Drill.
- Olivia Dewhurst as Kelly, a girl who is a friend of Drill and player of his game.
- Martin Cummins as President Chip Winters, the President of the United States. (Played by Gary Hershberger in the first episode.)
- Kirsten Robek as Beth Winters, the First Lady of the United States.
- Kayden Magnuson as Cassandra Winters, the First Daughter of the United States who is a friend of Drill and player of his game.
- Jay Paulson as Thomas Harcourt, Ron's son, who has a bad relationship with his father. He was an early friend of Drill and player of his game, which led to him killing his own brother.
- John Billingsley as Ron Harcourt, Thomas' father, a NASA satellite communications expert, who has a bad relationship with his son.
- Logan Williams as Elliot Harcourt, Thomas' brother who was the first child possessed by Drill back in 1982. Thomas figured it out and killed Elliot.
- Darien Provost as Nicholas Brewstar, a bullying victim who becomes a friend of Drill and player of his game.
- Tom Butler as Daniel Goetz / "Man in Blazer", a reporter for the Baltimore Observer working to expose Drill to the public. He claims Dr. Benavidez contacted him shortly after she was taken hostage by Sean.

== Episodes ==
No.	Title	Directed by	Written by	Original release date	US viewers (millions)
1	"X Marks the Spot"	Mark Romanek & Brad Turner	Teleplay by : Soo Hugh	June 1, 2015	5.66
FBI Child Specialist Claire Bennigan investigates the case of Amanda Weil, who fell from a treehouse in view of her daughter, Harper, and lies near death in the hospital. Harper tells Claire she was playing a game with her friend Drill, who seems to be imaginary. At a city park, a young girl named Minx accepts an invitation to the game. Harper draws a picture, and later tells Claire that there was another boy who lost the game. Claire learns of a boy named Jackson Bellings who also claimed to have an imaginary friend named Drill. Jackson detonated a bomb that killed him and injured his mother. His mother recalls seeing a man nearby before the blast, and a sketch is ordered. In the Sahara desert, Defense Department operative Wes Lawrence visits a military plane crash site. The pilot is missing, but Wes realizes who it was. He calls Claire to tell her about the crash and that her husband Sean is missing. Claire is confused, as Sean was supposed to be flying near the Arctic, not the Sahara. Minx, now revealed to be Wes's daughter, is led to his computer, where she is successful in hacking his government files. Claire realizes that Harper's drawing is of the President. She then receives a downloaded image of the Bellings sketch, and sees it is Sean.
2	"Hide & Seek"	Charles Beeson	Soo Hugh	June 8, 2015	4.24
"John Doe" arrives in Washington, D.C. Claire attempts to keep his sketch from the other bureau offices in order to run her own investigation into whether he may truly be her husband, Sean. Lena knows and is not pleased that Wes has been speaking with Claire about a case, and Drill continues playing his dangerous game with Minx, Henry and Harper. The deaf and mute Henry is able to speak out loud when communicating with Drill. The DoD comes to the Lawrence home after discovering Wes' secure account was hacked. Wes and Lena argue about the security breach which upsets Minx, so Minx admits that it was she who did it.
3	"Collision"	Charles Beeson	Dean Widenmann	June 15, 2015	3.90
In flashback, Sean hastily packs for his mission, upset with Claire about her infidelity. In present day, she sets outs to learn more about his mission and the mysterious John Doe. Wes also investigates him and his link to the Bellings bombing. Meanwhile, John Doe holds Dr. Benavidez hostage, escaping capture when lights in a bathroom flicker as a warning message. Elsewhere, Lena takes Minx to a therapist who tells her that Drill isn't real. Alone with Minx in the car, he proves them wrong. Wes and Claire realize that Drill has connected with several children and question Minx to piece together Sean's target: a nuclear reactor due to be inspected by Harper's father before his wife's accident.
4	"Meltdown"	Guillermo Navarro	Zack Estrin	June 22, 2015	3.87
Minx gives Henry a list of instructions from Drill, explaining it is very important to the game that he follow through. Henry winds up taking a bike ride to the nuclear plant. Sean has arrived at the plant with his hostage, Maria, in tow. Wes and Claire also arrive and meet with a team from the plant to try to prevent a meltdown. After exhausting a few options, the team decides flooding the core with water is the only solution. But Henry makes his way into the room where water induction would occur, with Drill's help, and he is spotted by Claire. Meanwhile, Maria has battled to escape Sean, only to be captured by FBI personnel, who don't believe she was a hostage. Claire then sees Sean breach the room and have a confused reunion with his son. Claire decides to also enter the room, as Sean seals off the water valve, preventing the core from being cooled. Claire discovers that Henry can now hear and speak. Facing certain death due to the pending meltdown, something happens that leaves everyone stunned.
5	"What Lies Beneath"	Matt Earl Beesley	Holly Harold	June 29, 2015	3.36
Another boy, Ethan, is shown talking to Drill and working with what appears to be a plastic explosive. Wes and the crew at the nuclear plant try to make sense of why the pending meltdown did not occur. All they know for sure is that the energy that would have caused the meltdown just disappeared. Wes tries to interview Sean, but gets nowhere. He grudingly lets Claire interview him, and she tries to jog her husband's memories with family photographs but it doesn't help. Wes tries again with Sean, this time hooking him up to a polygraph, but the polygraph image eventually displays the shape of the fulgumite in the Sahara. Overhearing a coworker's conversation, Wes realizes he must go back to Mali to investigate what is underneath the formation. Meanwhile, Claire gets clues from Lena that leads her to Ethan. Ethan explains that he is building a volcano for a school project, and that Drill has been helping him. Claire tries to deduce who may be in danger next. In Mali, Wes and a crew excavate a huge, glowing rock from beneath the fulgumite formation. In North America, Sean shudders violently in his cell, then says, "they found it."
6	"The Archer"	PJ Pesce	Alison Tatlock	July 6, 2015	3.36
Wes returns to the USA with the glowing rock. He works with a scientist named Dr. Tully, who eventually determines through analysis of the elements in the rock that it took a particular path through the known universe (including near Chi Sagittarii). She proclaims that it must be a vessel. Claire contacts all the parents with children known to have communicated with Drill, asking if she can talk to them in a group about their communications with the unknown being. All accept the offer except Lena, who is afraid to let Minx attend. While Claire communicates with the kids, a few offer information about Drill wanting to reconnect with his family. The lights flicker and go out, and the group is trapped in the room when the power locks on the door won't operate. When the door is broken down, power is restored, and Wes sees an unknown energy around Kelly and Henry as he views a thermal imaging monitor. Kelly says she has a message from Drill to Claire. He says, "you're not gonna win". At home, Lena plays a game with Minx to try to assess Drill's presence. After Minx correctly guesses from another room what Lena is doing, Lena gets scared. Minx says Drill likes Lena and has accepted her. Elsewhere, Sean has managed to convince Wes and Claire to bring him to the rock. Sean touches the rock, and after an apparent exchange of energy, he falls to the floor. He gets up, and now remembers who he is.
7	"Whatever It Takes"	Holly Dale	Michael Russell Gunn	July 13, 2015	3.55
Sean is debriefed by President Winters and a team from the DoD. Wes and Frommer insist that Sean must undergo experiments to see if he has any lingering brain effects after being possessed by Drill. Sean refuses, but ultimately agrees when given the choice between that or jail. He is allowed one night at home to reunite with Henry and Claire, but chooses to go to the rock the next morning rather than return to custody. In the President's car, his daughter Cassandra apparently communicates with Drill, then borrows her mother's phone to "play a game." Cassandra places the phone in her doll and leaves it on the floor of the car. It is still there when the President accompanies Wes to see the rock. As Sean convinces Tully that they must blow up the rock, Wes learns about the First Lady's cell phone from Cassandra. He realizes that Drill used the phone to track the President's movements and learn where the rock is. Wes also deduces that Drill needs to get to the rock to communicate with his home and call for reinforcements. He races to the secure area to try to get to the rock before Drill does. Although Drill appears to get there first, Sean blows up the rock, hoping he has destroyed Drill.
8	"A Hollow Man"	Kenneth Fink	Daniel C. Connolly	July 20, 2015	3.28
Upon hearing from his parents that Drill is gone, Henry says, "no, he's not," stating he communicated with him an hour ago. Lena tells Wes that she and Minx also communicated with Drill more recently than the rock explosion, but Minx lies and says she was just pretending. Claire is alerted to a 1982 psychological evaluation of a boy named Thomas, which mentions Thomas having an imaginary friend named Drill before killing his brother, Elliot. Claire and Sean, with Henry in tow, visit Thomas' father, a satellite communication expert, who confirms the incident and says that Thomas was institutionalized for ten years. Claire and Sean locate the adult Thomas, now living in seclusion with no electricity. Meanwhile, Lena agrees to a deal to kill someone, as long as Drill stops communicating with Minx. Thomas tells the story of how nuclear tests between 1950 and 1982 sent "beacons" into space, which eventually led to Drill coming to earth. He is horrified to hear about Henry and the others talking to Drill, saying the first Drill must have gotten out a distress signal before Thomas killed him. Claire and Sean are about to find out how Thomas killed Drill when Lena arrives and shoots Thomas.
9	"Broken Child"	Brad Turner	Ubah Mohamed	August 3, 2015	2.77
Sean and Claire rush Thomas to the hospital. They are met by Dr. Benavidez, who is not pleased to see Sean but accepts their story that he is no longer possessed. Wes meets up with Lena, shaken by what she has just done, and the two are hauled away in government vehicles. Frommer allows Claire and Wes 24 hours to follow up on what they've learned from Thomas. The two visit the institution where Thomas lived for ten years, and find an old drawing under the wallpaper in Thomas' old room. It shows a boy carrying a demon, and they determine from photos that the boy is Elliot, the brother Thomas killed. At the hospital, a sick boy is awakened after his sister communicates with Drill. Drill messes with the power, and the boy goes to see Thomas, demanding on threat of death that Thomas explain how he killed Drill. Thomas says that Drill destroyed his entire life anyway, and refuses to speak. Sean and Benavidez rush to save Thomas, but they are too late. Upon visiting the site of Elliot's killing, Wes and Claire determine not only how Thomas killed Drill, but why – because Thomas could see that Drill had now completely possessed Elliot. A horrified Claire breaks down, realizing it is only a matter of time before the new Drill finds another host child on earth. Frommer has eyes and ears on the conversation and meets with President Winters. As Cassandra plays outside, Frommer asks Winters point-blank if he'd be able to sacrifice a child to eliminate the alien being.
10	"Darkest Fears"	Ed Ornelas	Holly Harold & Dean Widenmann	August 10, 2015	2.68
A 10-year old boy named Nicholas, who is an outcast at school, is helped by Drill while being kicked by a group of boys. He agrees to follow Drill to an unknown destination. Wes and Lily work with a group of experts to track Drill by following a pattern of "brownouts" that act like bread crumbs. One expert theorizes that Drill is running out of energy. The team decides to corner Drill in an abandoned school building, but it involves blacking out multiple grids in D.C., causing a good deal of panic. Lena tells Wes she is taking Minx on a cruise, knowing Drill can't get to them through power lines if they are at sea. But their plans are disrupted by the blackouts. Lena gets worried when Wes doesn't answer his calls, and is helped home by a mysterious stranger. Elsewhere, Drill has been cornered in the school, with Lily and Wes thinking this is the end for him. But they soon discover that Nicholas is in the building. With nowhere else to go, Drill starts to possess Nicholas. President Winters, looking on with Frommer, makes the difficult decision to restore power, saving Nicholas but also letting Drill escape. Wes vows to Drill that they will still find him and destroy him. Lena and Minx make it home, where the water dispenser in the refrigerator starts emitting a continuous stream. Lena steps in the water and is electrocuted. Wes arrives moments later to find his wife's lifeless body, while Minx weeps outside.
11	"Homesick"	Ken Fink	Alison Tatlock & Michael Russell Gunn	August 17, 2015	2.51
At Lena's funeral, Minx begins to feel dizzy and passes out. Wes rushes her to the hospital, where he sees that multiple children have the same symptoms. Dr. Benavidez does a brain scan on Minx, and notes she has the same abnormality that the other children have. Wes meets with President Winters and Frommer, and says the brain abnormality must have been implanted by Drill. He insists all children with dizziness and fatigue symptoms be quarantined. This includes Winters' daughter Cassandra. The children are sent to a compound with no outside power lines, in hopes that Drill cannot interfere while the children are studied. Benavidez makes a discovery on her computer, only to be electrocuted. Wes now realizes Drill is in the compound, meaning a child is already possessed. Claire interviews each child to try to discover "tells" that will help her figure out whom Drill is possessing. A boy named Silas mentions the name "Orion" in his interview. He appears to know which child is Drill, but is afraid to tell because Drill threatened to kill his mother. In her interview, Minx says her dream is to build a time machine, to go back to "before all the bad stuff happened." Meanwhile, the mysterious man who drove Lena and Minx home is now seen following several people around. He is caught doing so by Sean. The man says he is Daniel Goetz, a reporter, and that his source was Dr. Benavidez. He says it's time the world knew about Drill. Back at the compound, alarms go off as Drill takes over the building. In the melee, Minx violently pushes Silas. All the children then point at Minx.
12	"Traveller in the Dark"	PJ Pesce	Soo Hugh & Daniel C. Connolly	August 24, 2015	2.68
An FBI team tries to recover the files from Dr. Benevidez's computer, but they have been wiped. An expert does recover a previous version of a file, which contains the heading "Millicent". Wes admits that Millicent is Minx's full name, but doesn’t want to believe Minx is Drill. Silas is interviewed by Claire again, and he swears he saw Minx in the office when Benevidez was electrocuted. Frommer gets President Winters to agree to execute Minx, and she is taken away before Wes can see her again. Meanwhile, Goetz wants to go public with what he's learned about the nuclear site incident, telling Sean he's convinced that "Drill" is a code name for some secret nuclear program. Sean says he will share the real story with Goetz, hoping the threat of the news will get the children released from the compound. When the President finds out about the pending story, he plans a quick press conference to head off the news release and prevent panic. Knowing that Minx is about to be executed, he will tell the world that the threat has been eliminated. While talking with Sean again, Goetz calls the President by his code name, Oberon. He explains that the first family all have code names that begin with the letter "O". Sean realizes that Cassandra is the "Orion" that Silas mentioned, and that she, not Minx, is Drill. He quickly gets a message to Claire and Wes. Claire realizes that Silas lied about Minx to save his mother. Wes barely makes it to the compound in time to save Minx. Claire tries to rush into the press conference, but is tackled by Secret Service. As Claire suspected, Cassandra uses the news uplinks in the press conference to get out a distress signal.
13	"Game Over"	Charles Beeson	Zack Estrin & Ubah Mohamed	August 31, 2015	2.75
Drill's end game finally comes to play, as he disposes of Cassandra's body to send out a sleeper cell to the children he has contacted over the years, including fully grown adults. Claire and Wes try to uncover the clues to Drill's end game, while Sean meets with Thomas' father, Ron, to find the meaning behind the mysterious signal Drill sent out. As the children embark on a mysterious objective, Claire and Sean are kidnapped by some adults Drill contacted back in the 1980s, keeping them out of the way. Wes manages to rescue both of them and take them back to headquarters, where the Pentagon has sent out a warhead to destroy the aliens' pods flying towards Earth. However, Henry informs them that they failed. Apparently deaf again, Henry reveals to Claire via sign language that the distress signal Drill sent was answered back: "Are the children ready?" The team concludes the aliens aren't there to dominate the world, but to take the children. Sean uses one of his tattoos to reveal where each child has gone to await their abduction. He, Claire, Henry and Wes race to save Minx before she is taken. The four arrive in a forest, where Minx is awaiting in her designated spot. Wes splits from Claire, Sean, and Henry to find Minx, and Henry guides Claire and Sean to where she is located. It turns out to be a ruse, as Henry is still under Drill's command and stands in his marked location. Wes manages to track down Minx, but she is abducted by the aliens before he can reach her. Claire, desperate to save her son, pushes him out of the way and stands in the beam of light shining down. Sean attempts to save her, but Claire is then abducted by the aliens. After completing "the game", the aliens disappear into the sky.

== Production ==
On May 23, 2014, it was announced the series would no longer film in Los Angeles, California, and would move to Vancouver for filming. On June 11, 2014, it was announced that Brianna Brown, who was set to play Lena Lawrence, had exited the series due to creative reasons. Production on the first season wrapped on December 20, 2014. On June 30, 2015, it was announced that ABC had let the contracts for the cast expire and if the series were to be picked up for a second season, Lily Rabe would only appear in a limited number of episodes. On October 19, 2015, ABC announced that it had canceled The Whispers after only one season.

== Release ==
=== Broadcast ===
Seven Network aired the show in Australia.

=== Home media ===
The Whispers was released on DVD in Region 1 on November 11, 2017.

== Reception ==
The Whispers has received generally favorable critical reception. The review aggregator website Rotten Tomatoes reports a 74% approval rating with an average rating of 6.8/10 based on 32 reviews. The website's consensus reads, "Though predictable and, at times, poorly paced, The Whispers is a structurally sound and stimulating supernatural mystery with an enjoyable ensemble of creepy kids." On Metacritic, the series holds a score of 61 out of 100, based on 21 critics, signifying "generally favorable reception".
