= Viva (Canadian magazine) =

Canadian lifestyle magazine

Viva magazine is a Canadian natural health celebrity magazine and the original balanced living publication. It was launched in November 2004.

== History and profile ==
Viva was founded by Olivier Felicio, is published six times per year and circulates within Canada throughout Loblaws, health food stores, pharmacies and salons. It is a free publication under the Rive Gauche Media Publishing umbrella.

Celebrities who have appeared on the cover of Viva Magazine include Serena Williams, Taraji P. Henson, Patricia Arquette, Maria Bello, Courteney Cox, Patricia Heaton, Marg Helgenberger, Rachel Hunter, Jennifer Love Hewitt, Alyssa Milano, Kathryn Morris, Julia Ormond, Ana Ortiz, Jaime Pressly, Vanessa Williams, Cheryl Ladd, Heidi Klum and Christina Applegate.

Health topics featured in the magazine include fibromalgia, cancer, joint pain, menopause, allergies and celiac disease. Beauty topics covered in the magazine include hair removal, winter skin care, lip care, wrinkles-anti-aging, and acne treatments.

In 2011 the circulation of Viva was 45,000 copies. The magazine stopped printing copies in early 2019 with the Winter 2018/2019 being its last issue.
