= Flying Lessons (2024 film) =

- Directed by: Elizabeth Nichols
- Written by: Chris Boeckmann; Elizabeth Nichols; Luiza Parvu
- Produced by: Elizabeth Nichols; Alik Barsoumian
- Starring: Philly Abe
- Cinematography: Elizabeth Nichols
- Edited by: Luiza Parvu
- Release date: 2024
- Running time: 84 minutes
- Language: English

Flying Lessons is a 2024 documentary film which focuses on New York artist Philly Abe. Elizabeth Nichols, the director of the film, first met Abe around 2016 while filming tenant meetings and protests.
