= Flying Lessons (2010 film) =

2010 film by Derek Magyar

- Film poster
- Directed by: Derek Magyar
- Written by: Thomas Kuehl
- Produced by: Jenny Hinkey; Derek Magyar
- Starring: Maggie Grace; Christine Lahti; Cary Elwes; Jonathan Tucker; Hal Holbrook
- Cinematography: Joshua Hess
- Edited by: Richard A. Harris
- Music by: Jesse Glick
- Production companies: Gran Via Productions; Red Cam Studios; SkinnyLee Productions
- Distributed by: New Films Cinema
- Release date: February 4, 2010 (Santa Barbara)
- Running time: 104 minutes
- Country: United States
- Language: English

Flying Lessons is a 2010 American drama film directed by Derek Magyar and starring Maggie Grace, Christine Lahti, Cary Elwes, Jonathan Tucker and Hal Holbrook.

== Plot ==
Sophie Conway returns home amidst life-struggles and is faced with abandoned friends, a messy relationship with her mother, and an Alzheimer's Disease patient named Harry Pleasant.

== Cast ==
- Cary Elwes as Steven Jennings
- Maggie Grace as Sophie Conway
- Nikki DeLoach as Mila
- Joanna Cassidy as Totty Kuspert
- Christine Lahti as Caroline Conway
- Jonathan Tucker as Billy
- Hal Holbrook as Harry Pleasant
