= District 13: Ultimatum =

2009 film by Patrick Alessandrin

- Theatrical release poster
- French: Banlieue 13: Ultimatum
- Directed by: Patrick Alessandrin
- Written by: Luc Besson
- Produced by: Luc Besson
- Starring: Cyril Raffaelli; David Belle; Philippe Torreton; Daniel Duval; Élodie Yung
- Cinematography: Jean-François Hensgens
- Music by: Da Octopusss; Trak Invaders
- Production companies: EuropaCorp; TF1 Films Production; CiBy 2000
- Distributed by: EuropaCorp
- Release date: 18 February 2009 (France)
- Running time: 106 minutes
- Country: France
- Language: French
- Budget: $13.6 million
- Box office: $14.1 million

District 13: Ultimatum, also known as D13-U (French: Banlieue 13 – Ultimatum or B13-U), is a 2009 French action thriller film and a sequel to the 2004 film District 13. Directed by Patrick Alessandrin and written and produced by Luc Besson (who also wrote and produced the first film), the film sees parkour artists Cyril Raffaelli and David Belle reprising their original roles of Damien and Leïto.

== Plot ==
Three years after the events of the original film, the authorities are attempting to return law and order to ravaged District 13. However, their efforts so far have failed to do so. The death of gang overlord Taha Ben Mahmoud has left a power vacuum, and total control of the area is now being fought over by five rival territorial gang lords who want to step into Taha's position. Leïto tries demolishing the walls surrounding the district on a daily basis, but is told to stop by African gang lord Molko, who sees the walls as protection from outside the district.

After single-handedly eliminating a major drug dealer, Damien is framed for drug dealing and arrested, but manages to make a brief call to Leïto to come rescue him.

Meanwhile, corrupt government agents from the Department of Internal State Security (DISS), led by Walter Gassman are bent on destroying the five tower blocks at the heart of District 13 with tactical precision bombing, and building luxury flats after the area is cleared. In order to spark conflict with the district's gangs, the DISS shoot two policemen, dump their car in District 13, and prompt several gang members into gunning down the vehicle, making it look like the gang members killed the policemen. The footage of the incident convinces the French President to carry out the strike. However, the DISS were witnessed killing the policemen and filmed by a teenager named Samir and his friends. The DISS agents soon come after the teen to arrest him, but Samir manages to give his memory card to Leïto before being arrested.

Leïto gets himself arrested in order to get into the prison. He then escapes the police and rescues Damien. After freeing Damien from his cell, they discuss the events (deducing that Damien was framed by DISS to keep him from finding out their plans during the crisis) and further plans, resolving to gather enough proof to expose the DISS agents. While Damien distracts the guards, Leïto breaks into Gassman's office to steal his hard-drive for the evidence that they need. Once they escape and return to District 13, Damien and Leïto convince the five gang lords Tao, Molko, Little Montana, Karl the skinhead, and Ali-K to band together and prevent the destruction of the district. While the President struggles with the decision to destroy District 13, even with the area evacuated, a large number of gang members storm the Élysée Palace. They eventually reach the President and show him the information that they acquired, proving Gassman is a corrupt DISS agent. Gassman then takes the President hostage and tries to force him to approve the mass demolition. Leïto, Damien, and the gang lords succeed in freeing the President and incapacitating Gassman, earning the President's thanks and a promise to fund District 13's restoration.

With the conflict over and District 13 completely evacuated, the gang lords then decide that it would be better to rebuild District 13 anew rather than try to patch up its remnants. The movie ends with the President authorizing the strike, the District 13 buildings exploding and the president breathing a sigh of relief, stating that he needs a drink.

In a post-credits scene, a short clip shows the President, the gang lords, Damien and Leïto all joking around and smoking cigars together.

== Cast ==
- David Belle as Leïto
- Cyril Raffaelli as Damien Tomaso
- Philippe Torreton as President
- Daniel Duval as Walter Gassman
- Élodie Yung as Tao, leader of the Asian gang
- MC Jean Gab'1 as Molko, leader of the African gang
- Fabrice Feltzinger as Little Montana, leader of the Gypsy gang
- James Deano as Karl, leader of the Skinhead gang
- La Fouine as Ali-K, leader of the Arab gang
- Pierre-Marie Mosconi as Roland
- Sophie Ducasse as Sonya
- Jean-François Lénogue as Jeff
- Lannick Gautry as the cool friend
- Lise Lamétrie as the mute secretary

== Reception ==
On review aggregator website Rotten Tomatoes, the film holds an approval rating of 75% based on 75 reviews, and an average rating of 6.1/10. The website's critical consensus reads, "District 13 bites off more than it can chew with its political subtext and questionable script, but the many action sequences are never less than entertaining." On Metacritic, the film has a weighted average score of 64 out of 100, based on 19 critics, indicating "generally favorable" reviews.

== Releases ==
The original French-language version of District B13: Ultimatum was released in France on 18 February 2009. The English-language version of the film was released in the United Kingdom on 29 October 2009, and it premiered in the United States in a free screening in New York on 28 January 2010.

The film was released on DVD and Blu-ray in France on 19 August 2009. The Region 1 version was released on 27 April 2010.
