= Yamakasi (film) =

2001 film by Ariel Zeitoun, and Julien Seri

- Poster
- Directed by: Ariel Zeitoun; Julien Seri
- Written by: Luc Besson; Philippe Lyon; Julien Seri
- Produced by: Virginie Silla
- Starring: Châu Belle Dinh; Williams Belle; Malik Diouf; Yann H'Nautra; Guylain N'Guba Boyeke; Laurent Piemontesi; Charles Perrière
- Cinematography: Philippe Piffeteau
- Edited by: Yohann Costedoat; Stéphanie Gaurier; Yann Hervé; Claude-France Husson; Célia Lafitedupont; Christine Lucas Navarro; Charlotte Rembauville
- Music by: DJ Spank; Joeystarr
- Distributed by: Europa Corp.
- Release date: 4 April 2001
- Running time: 90 minutes
- Country: France
- Language: French
- Budget: $6.9 million
- Box office: $18.7 million

Yamakasi – Les Samouraïs des temps modernes is a 2001 French film featuring the Yamakasi. The 2004 film Les fils du vent is a semi-sequel playing in Bangkok.

== Plot ==
The Yamakasi are a group of young thrill seekers of different ethnic backgrounds who are all dedicated to parkour. They live in France in a banlieue, a ghetto especially designed for paupers and traditionally inhabited by immigrants from former French colonies. The motley group uses their sport to enjoy themselves without drugs and to gain recognition in a peaceful way. One morning, they are reported buildering the east side of the Bleuets building and evading the police after that. While they consider themselves good examples for youths in the banlieue, the local chief of police feels otherwise. From his point of view, they are reckless and dangerous individuals prone to become criminals while one of his men, Inspector Vincent Asmine believes they are dangerous only because children could hurt themselves by trying to emulate them. On this occasion each single member is introduced through his birth name and alias to the spectators of the film too: Zicmu (Ousmane Dadjacan), Tango (Jean-Michel Lucas), Rocket (Abdou N'Goto), the Spider (Bruno Duris), the Weasel (Malik N'Diaye), Baseball (Oliver Chen), and Sitting Bull (Ousmane Bana).

Following this meeting, two pupils enjoy themselves by climbing in a tree. A third little boy named Djamel who is with them suffers with an inborn cardiovascular disease. When he tries to join them, he has a cardiac arrest after falling from the tree. In the hospital, his mother and eldest sister, Aila learn an immediate heart transplantation is imperative. The chief physician suggests to save the child by buying a heart from a shady broker. He stresses that this is the only solution but not supported by their health insurance. He demands from the boy's family to pay 400,000 Francs within 24 hours.

The head physician advises the family to ask their friends, neighbors, and family for support. This includes the Yamakasi who go and visit Djamel in the hospital and promise to train him to be a Yamakasi member once they have found a way to help him survive his upcoming operation. Then, they go and talk to the head physician himself and ask why a child is supposed to die only because his parents are poor. They insist he would contact the hospital's board of directors. When he refuses to phone either of them, they steal the list of names and decide to walk in the footsteps of Robin Hood.

They split up into 3 groups which each robs one or two houses of the board of directors. The first two robberies are successful, however one of the groups gets chased out of a house by Dobermans and is captured on camera. The police realize that the board of directors is being targeted and attempt to catch the Yamakasi in their next robberies, but are unsuccessful. The Yamakasi finally converge on the mansion of the head of the directors. The police arrive quickly and surround the house. With no chance of escaping, they instead gather all of the loot from the robberies into a bag and toss to Baseball's friend and working partner, Michelin who pawns it off for the needed amount of money.

The Yamakasi are questioned by the police and each give the same story which the investigator finds ridiculous. However, Asmine, who is actually one of the Yamakasi members' (Sitting Bull) cousin, backs up their story, leaving the investigator with no choice but to let them go. They arrive at the hospital just as the head physician is attempting to raise the price on the heart at gunpoint and convince him to authorize the surgery at the price they are giving him, thanks to Inspector Asmine's intervention.

The Yamakasi then celebrate Djamel's successful recovery from surgery along with Asmine who has retired from police work and start talking to the camera recording them about their joy over his recovery and how they intend to train him to become one of them once he is fully recovered and out of the hospital.

== Cast ==
- Ousmane Dadjacan a.k.a. "Zicmu" (played by Yann Hnautra), able to escape police with by jumping from balconies letting go of his ghettoblaster
- Jean-Michel Lucas a.k.a. "Tango" (played by Laurent Piemontesi), the banlieue's Fred Astaire"
- Abdou N'Goto a.k.a. "Rocket" (played by Guylain N'Guba-Boyeke), able to outrun police at incredible speed.
- Bruno Duris a.k.a. "the Spider" (played by Williams Belle), who is very inventive in regards to abseiling
- Malik N'Diaye a.k.a. "the Weasel" (played by Malik Diouf)
- Oliver Chen a.k.a. "Baseball" (played by Châu Belle Dinh), a gifted pitcher who works in a supermarket and once stopped a shoplifter by pitching a tin can
- Ousmane Bana a.k.a. "Sitting Bull" (played by Charles Perrière), a construction worker who loves heights and a wide view
- Maher Kamoun as Inspector Vincent Asmine, and Sitting Bull's cousin
- Bruno Flender as Michelin, a fat strong guy
- Amel Djemel as Aila
- Afida Tahri as Fatima
- Nassim Faid as Djamel (credited as Nassim Faïd)
- Pascal Léger as Commissaire Orsini
- Frédéric Pellegeay as Fretin
- Gerald Morales as Chief doctor Le Tronc (credited as Gérald Morales)
- Chloé Flipo as Claire
- Perkins as Nicolas
- David Tissot as Gaultier
- Isabelle Moulin as Bourgeoise
- Stéphane Boucher as Parano
- Rebecca Hampton as the secretary of the minister's advisor
- Camille Cottin
