= David Belle =

French actor, film choreographer and stunt coordinator (born 1973)

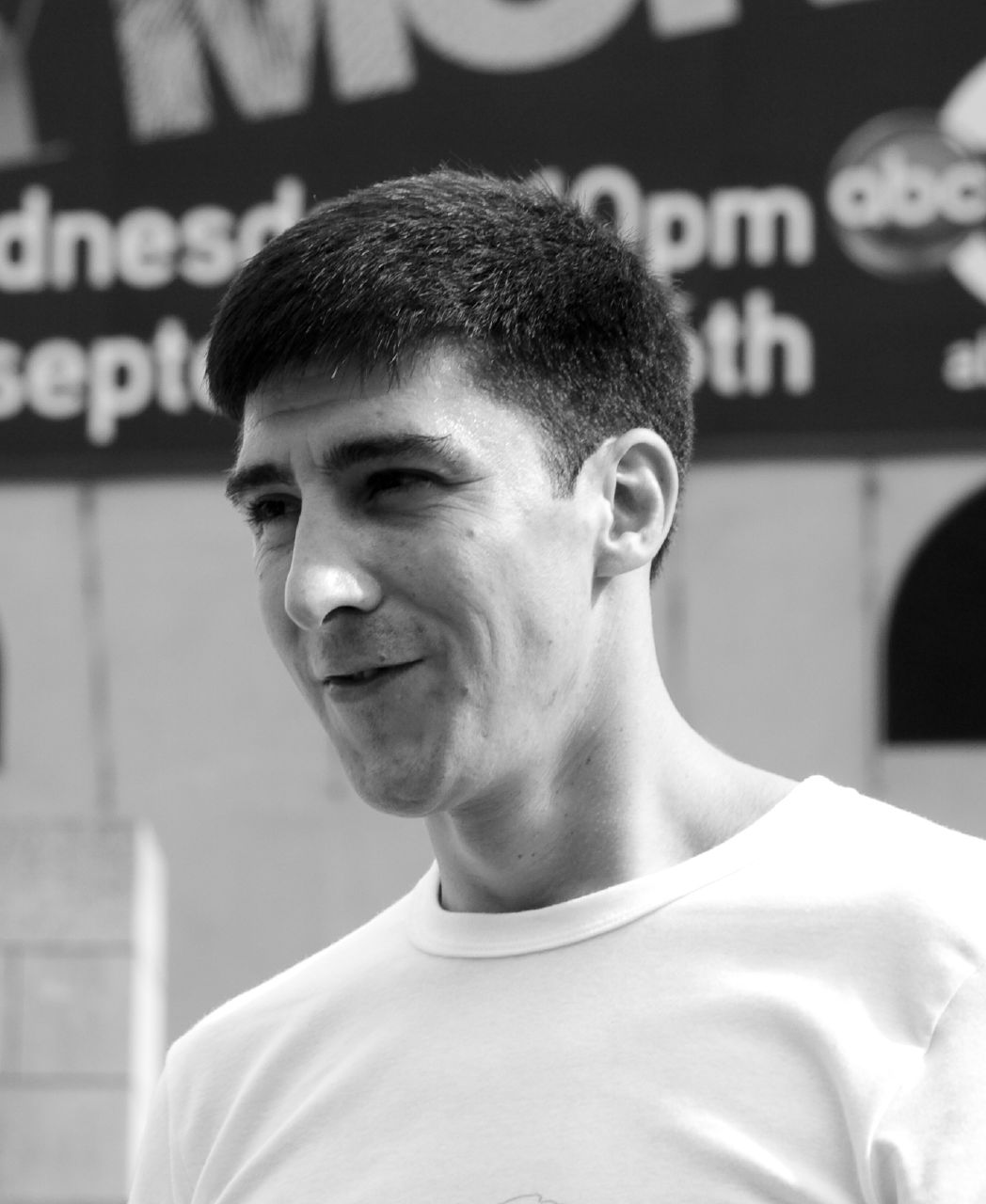
- Belle at the New Yorker Festival 2007
- Born: David Nicolas Belle; 29 April 1973 (age 53); Fécamp, France
- Occupations: Celebrity, Choreographer, Stunt coordinator
- Known for: Parkour, film District 13
- Parent(s): Raymond Belle (father); Monique Kitten (mother)

David Nicolas Belle (born 29 April 1973) is a French actor, film choreographer and stunt coordinator. He is deemed the founder and leading pioneer of the physical discipline parkour, coining it based on his training and the teachings from his father Raymond Belle.

Belle came to fame via his parkour videos and film appearances, such as District 13, District 13: Ultimatum, which were written and produced by Luc Besson, and the American remake Brick Mansions. Belle has also consulted on the making of Babylon A.D., Prince of Persia, Colombiana, The Family, and the videogame series Dying Light. In 2017, he became chair of the newly formed Parkour Commission of the International Gymnastics Federation (FIG)—a move that drew opposition from segments of the international parkour community and led to the formation of Parkour Earth—before he later stepped down from the role.

== Life and career ==
Belle was born and raised in Fécamp, the son of Monique and Raymond Belle of Paris. His grandfather Gilbert Kitten, father Raymond, and brother Jean-François Belle were highly skilled rescuers in the Military Paris Fire Brigade. His father Raymond Belle was born in French Indochina, and was of French and Vietnamese descent, while his mother Monique Kitten was of French and English ancestry.

David Belle began developing parkour in Normandy while living with his grandfather, Gilbert. In 1984, at the age of 11, Belle moved to Lisses, France. He made close friends with a group of teenagers with similar physical passions who began training with him, transferring the techniques he learned in Normandy to an urban environment. Some of the friends that trained with David would later become known as the Yamakasi. Later in life, Belle spent time in the military and fire brigade with aspirations of following in his father's and grandfather's footsteps. David left soon after for personal reasons, as he felt the regimented life of the military was antithetical to his character. During his time in the Marines, he set the Regimental record for rope climbing (which was previously held by his father, Raymond) and earned a certificate of honor for his gymnastic abilities.

Upon completing his national service, he worked in various professions including a warehouse worker, security guard and furniture salesman. He also spent 3 months in India studying kung fu. After his return he continued his training in parkour and filmed footage of his capabilities which he later turned into the famous Speed Air Man video. In 1997 the Stade 2 team were shown a video of Belle and decided to film the first news broadcast featuring him and the Yamakasi.

In filming this news feature, the term Yamakasi was used for the first time in connection with the team. Belle did not approve of the name and felt like it did not give credit to his father, so he split from the group after the feature. Later Belle would go on to train other students who gave themselves the name 'tracer.' The spelling was later adapted to 'traceur', and has since been used to define a practitioner of parkour.

Belle was first introduced to his acting career in a meeting with Hubert Koundé (La Haine), in order to discuss the success of parkour in cinema. He then began developing his acting ability with the play Pygmalion, and has since been successful in obtaining a number of roles mostly in French films and promotions. Belle has been featured in promotional videos for Tina Turner, and Iam. He has starred in "Les gens du voyages" and "Un monde meilleur", followed by "L'Engrenages" and "Femme Fatale", as well as "Les rivières pourpres 2", starring Jean Reno. After filming several more advertisements and promotions for the BBC, Nissan, Canon, and Nike, Belle was contacted by Luc Besson (director of Nikita, and The Fifth Element) regarding co-starring as lead actor with Cyril Raffaelli in the action movie District 13, followed by the sequel District 13: Ultimatum. Belle co-starred with Paul Walker in Brick Mansions (2014), a remake of District 13.

== Filmography ==
=== Film and television ===
Year	Title	Role	Notes
2000	Louis Page	Laurent	Episode: "Les gens du voyage"
2001	Engrenage, L	Le créancier	
2002	Femme Fatale	French Cop	
2004	District 13	Leïto	Parkour film debut
2005	Un monde meilleur	Good Guy #1	
2008	Babylon A.D.	Hacker Kid	
2009	District 13: Ultimatum	Leïto	
2012	Métal Hurlant Chronicles	Red Light	Episode: "Red Light/Cold Hard Facts"
2013	Malavita	Mezzo	
2014	Brick Mansions	Lino Duppre	English language remake of District 13
2014	Jaya	Jaya	Short film
2016	Super Express	Gary	
2018	Defying Chase		
2019	The Ultimate Code		
2019	Invisible Tattoo	Marco	
2020	Rogue City	Zach Damato	Bronx (in French)

=== Stunts ===
Year	Title/Company	Notes
2000	Ménélik – Limbo Negro	Music video
2000	Ford	Commercial
2002	BBC One	Advertising Campaign
2002	Lester Bilal feat. David Belle – Vibration	Music video
2002	Canon	Commercial
2002	Nike	Commercial
2002	Nissan	Commercial
2003	Crimson Rivers II: Angels of the Apocalypse	Stunt Coordinator
2005	Transporter 2	Stunt Coordinator
2010	Prince of Persia: The Sands of Time	Stunt Coordinator
2011	Covert Affairs	Stunt Coordinator
2011	Colombiana	Stunt Coordinator

=== Video games ===
Year	Title	Role	Notes
2015	Dying Light	Antoine Merpe	Also Mo-Cap, Stunt Coordinator & Counseling
2022	Dying Light 2	Hakon	Also Mo-Cap, Stunt Coordinator & Counseling

== Endorsements and groups ==
Belle largely stays out of the public spotlight. His last major appearance was when he appeared as a guest at the New Yorker Festival in 2007. Belle was interviewed for the parkour article "No Obstacles" written by Alec Wilkinson which was published in April 2007.

Belle formerly endorsed the clothing company Take Flight, but decided to sever his ties to the brand because he disapproved of their business activities and motives.

Belle's official website managed by his management and team is DavidBelleParkour.com

== See also ==
- Sébastien Foucan
