= Jacopone da Todi =

Italian Franciscan friar and writer

Jacopone of Todi O.F.M.
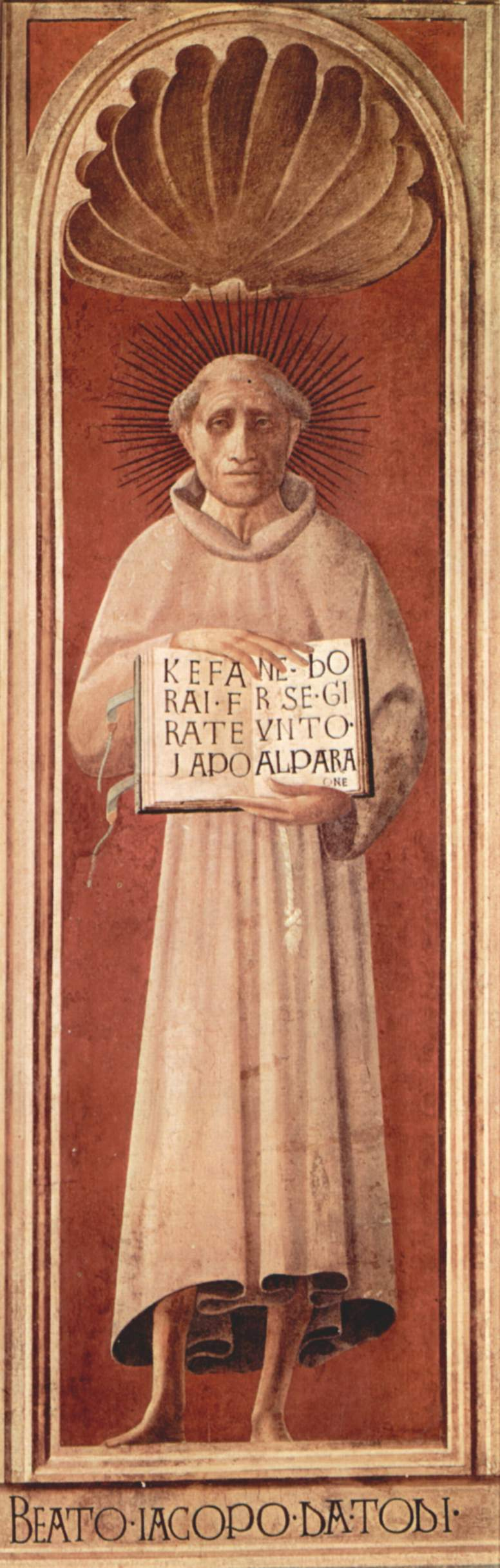
- Jacopone da Todi in a portrait by Paolo Uccello
- Born: Jacopo dei Benedetti c. 1230; Todi, Umbria, Papal States
- Died: 25 December 1306; Collazzone, Umbria, Papal States
- Venerated in: Order of Friars Minor & Todi, Perugia, Italy
- Major shrine: Church of San Fortunato, Todi, Perugia, Italy

Jacopone da Todi O.F.M. (c. 1230 – 25 December 1306) was an Italian Franciscan friar from Umbria. He wrote several laude (songs in praise of the Lord) in the local vernacular. He was an early pioneer in Italian theatre, being one of the earliest scholars who dramatised Gospel subjects.

== Life ==
Born Jacopo dei Benedetti, he was a member of a minor noble family. He studied law in Bologna and became a successful lawyer. At some point in his late 20s, he married a young noblewoman, Vanna di Bernardino di Guidone, who according to some accounts, was a pious and generous woman. Due to his reputation as a worldly and greedy man, she took it upon herself to mortify her flesh in atonement for his behavior.

Not long after their wedding, Benedetti urged his wife to attend a public tournament. In the course of the spectacle, she was killed when part of the stand in which she was sitting gave way. Rushing to her side, he discovered that she had been wearing a hairshirt. The shock of his wife's death and the evidence of her secret penance made such an impression on him that he abandoned his profession and became a Franciscan tertiary.

Benedetti gave up his legal practice, gave away all his possessions and from about 1268 lived as a wandering ascetic, joining the Third Order of St. Francis. During this period, he gained a reputation as a madman, due to his eccentric behavior, acting out his spiritual vision, earning him the nickname he was to embrace of Jacopone. Examples of this behavior included appearing in the public square of Todi, wearing a saddle and crawling on all fours. On another occasion, he appeared at a wedding in his brother's house, tarred and feathered from head to toe.

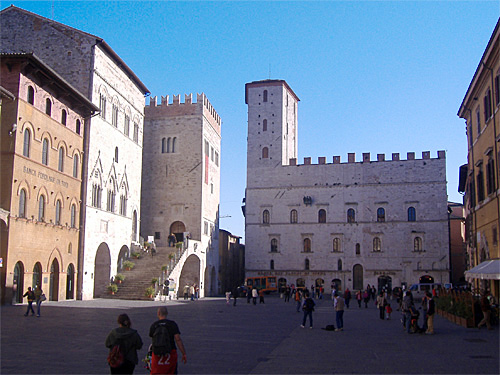
The Piazza del Popolo in Todi, where Jacopone crawled around on one occasion

After about ten years of this life, Benedetti sought admission to the Friars Minor, but they were reluctant to accept him due to his reputation. He soon composed a beautiful poem on the vanities of the world, which led to his admission into the Order in 1278. He chose to live as a lay brother.

By this time, two broad factions had arisen in the Franciscan Order, one with a more lenient, less mystical attitude and one being more severe, preaching absolute poverty and penitence (known as the "Spirituals" or Fraticelli). Benedetti believed that the friars’ engagement with the University of Paris undermined the concepts of humilitas and simplicitas. He was connected with the latter group and in 1294 they sent a deputation to Pope Celestine V to ask permission to live separately from the other friars and to observe the Franciscan Rule in its perfection. The request was granted but Celestine resigned the papacy before action was taken and was succeeded by Pope Boniface VIII, who opposed the more rigorous views.

During the struggle that followed, Benedetti publicized the Spirituals' cause by writing verses highly critical of their opponents, the pope included. When two brother-cardinals, the Colonnas, sided with the Spirituals and with the king of France against Pope Boniface, and Benedetti gave his support to the Colonnas, politics and even war entered upon the scene. The pope excommunicated them. A battle between the two rival parties ensued, ending with the siege of Palestrina and the imprisonment and excommunication of Benedetti in 1298. He was freed in 1303 upon the death of Boniface, having been specifically excluded from the Jubilee Year of 1300 by papal bull.

Broken and in poor health, Benedetti retired to Collazzone, a small town situated on a hill between Perugia and Todi, where he was cared for by a community of Poor Clares. His condition deteriorated toward the end of 1306, and he sent word requesting that his old friend, John of La Verna, come to give him the last rites. John arrived on Christmas Eve and comforted him, as he died about midnight.

Benedetti's body was originally buried in the monastery church. In 1433 his grave was discovered and his remains transferred to a crypt in the Franciscan Church of San Fortunato in Todi.

== Poetry ==
Benedetti's satirical and denunciatory Laude witness to the troubled times of the warring city-states of northern Italy and the material and spiritual crisis that accompanied them. The laude are written in his native Umbrian dialect and represent the popular poetry of the region. Many hundreds of manuscripts attest to the broad popularity of his poems in many contexts - although anonymous poems are often attributed to him by the tradition. Other laude extol the spiritual value of poverty.

Some of his laude were especially in use among the so-called Laudesi and the Flagellants, who sang them in the towns, along the roads, in their confraternities and in sacred dramatical representations. With hindsight, the use of the laude may be seen as an early seed of Italian drama that came to fruition in later centuries.

The Latin poem Stabat Mater Dolorosa is generally attributed to Benedetti, although this has been disputed. It is a fine example of religious lyric in the Franciscan tradition. It was inserted into the Roman Missal and Breviary in 1727 for the Feast of the Seven Sorrows of the Blessed Virgin Mary, celebrated on the Friday before Good Friday. Following changes by Pope Pius XII, it now appears on the Feast of Our Lady's Sorrows celebrated on 15 September. Many composers have set it to music, including Josquin des Prez, Giovanni Palestrina, Alessandro Scarlatti, Domenico Scarlatti, Giovanni Battista Pergolesi, Gioacchino Rossini, Toivo Kuula, Antonín Dvořák and Ernő Dohnányi.

His poem Donna de Paradiso is often cited as the first true work of Italian theater, this poem dramatizes the Passion of Christ through four distinct speaking roles: a messenger, the Virgin Mary, Christ, and an angry crowd. The fast-paced exchanges create real time dramatic tension without relying on a traditional narrator to explain the plot. Writing in his native Umbrian dialect rather than the standard Latin made the religious stories far more accessible to ordinary audiences. His uses of raw, everyday speech and urgent rhythms laid the groundwork for realistic dialogue in later Italian drama. Rather than portraying religious figures as distinct icons, Jacopone emphasized raw human emotion and physical suffering. In Donna de Paradiso, the Virgin Mary is depicted as a grieving mother pleading with the crowd, bringing psychological depth to medieval performance.

== Veneration ==
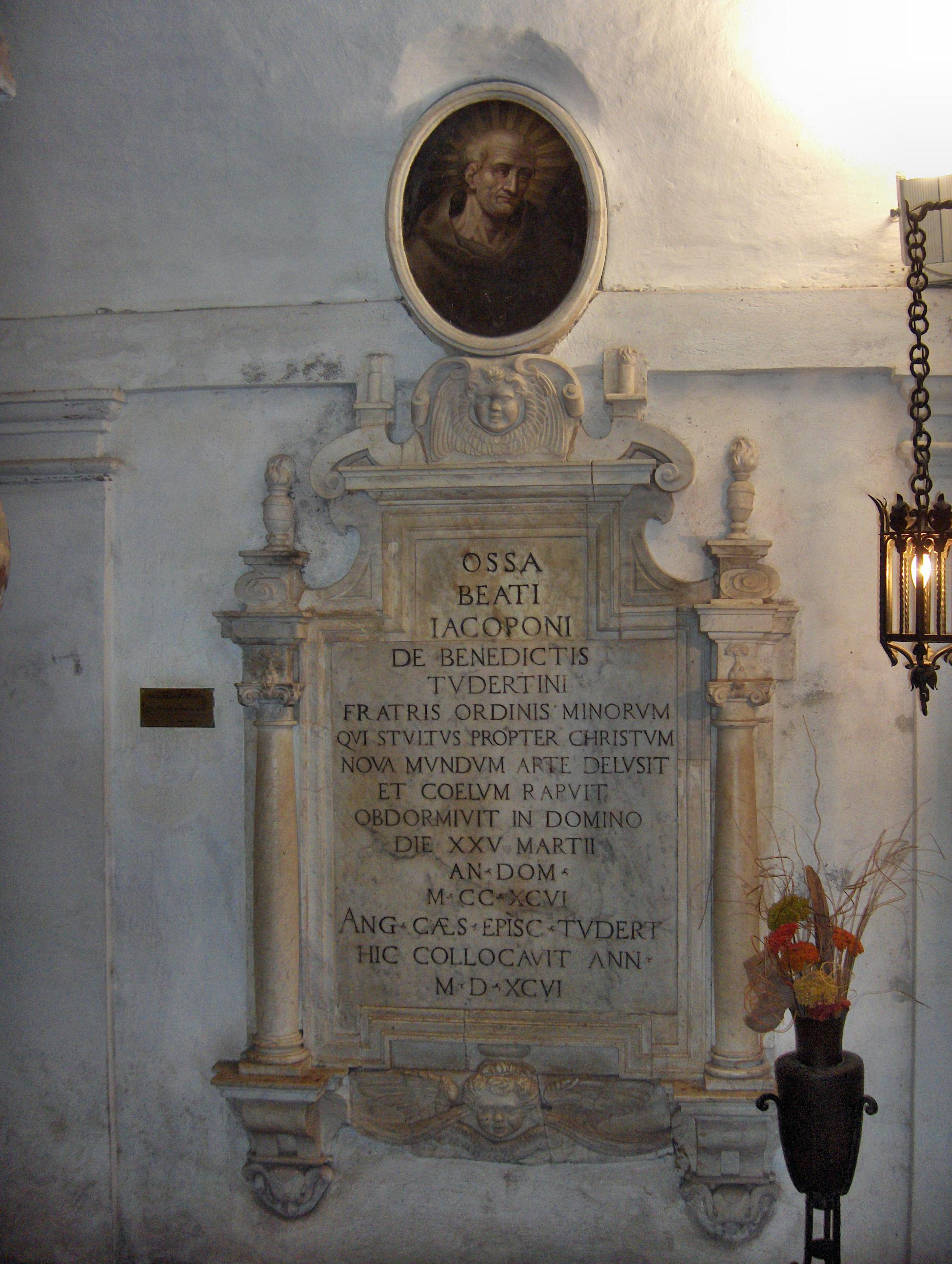
Tomb of Jacopone in San Fortunato, Todi

From the time of his death, Benedetti was considered to have been a saint by his followers, both within and outside of the Franciscan Order. He is honored as Blessed within the Order.

Several attempts were made over the centuries to have the Catholic Church recognize his sanctity. In the 17th century, both the City Council and the cathedral chapter of Todi petitioned the Holy See to do so. In the 19th century, the Postulator for the causes of saints of the Order of Friars Minor collected documents for this step.

To date, however, the church has never formally approved this devotion. One possible reason for this may be the conflict between Benedetti and Pope Boniface VIII.

== Legacy ==
Benedetti was steadfast in condemning corruption, especially through his satirical Italian poems. Benedetti would not recant his position on the requirement of ascetic poverty, believing that the mainstream church had become corrupt and that its ministers were not interested in the welfare of the poor. It was a time of famine and poverty in Italy and many mystics and preachers like Gioacchino da Fiore anticipated the end of the world and the coming of Christ. They also said kings and clergy had become too attached to material goods and too interested in their personal wars rather than the welfare of the country.

Benedetti's preaching attracted many enthusiasts.

== See also ==
- Christian mystics
- Christian poetry
- Saint Francis of Assisi

== Sources ==
- Novati, Francesco (1925). Freschi e minii del Dugento. Milan: Cogliatti. pp. 202–204.
- Sapegno, Natalino (1926). Santo Jacopone. Turin: Edizioni del Baretti. p. 30.
- Giudice, Aldo; Bruni, Giovanni (1981). Problemi e scrittori della letteratura italiana. Turin: Paravia.
- Lachance, P. (2003). "Jacopone da Todi". New Catholic Encyclopedia. Vol. 15: Hol–Jub (2 ed.). Detroit: Thomson Gale. pp. 692–3.
- Iacopone da Todi: The Power of Mysticism and the Originality of Franciscan Poetry (2024)
- Jacopone da Todi, Poet and Mystic, 1228–1306: A Spiritual Biography (1919 / Reprinted 2021)
- Peri, Claudio, and Andrew Halpin. "The International Contribution to the Study of Jacopone da Todi." Journal of Medieval Religious Cultures, vol. 48, no. 2, 2022, pp. 205-240.

== Bibliography ==
- Venuti, Lawrence. Translation Changes Everything. Routledge, 2012. Chapter 4: Translating Jacopone da Todi: archaic poetries and modern audiences.
