= The Bewitched Bourgeois =

2025 short story collection

- Author: Dino Buzzati
- Translator: Lawrence Venuti
- Language: English
- Genre: Short story collection
- Publisher: NYRB Classics
- Publication date: January 2025
- Publication place: United States
- Pages: 328
- ISBN: 978-1-68137-867-1

The Bewitched Bourgeois: Fifty Stories is a 2025 short story collection by Italian writer Dino Buzzati, translated by Lawrence Venuti. An original selection of Buzzati's works, it runs through 50 works of short fiction written by Buzzati for a variety of publications in chronological order of publishing, although the vast majority were first in the Corriere della Sera, the newspaper where Buzzati spent most of his career. Buzzati won the Strega Prize for an Italian collection of his short stories, and The Bewitched Bourgeois received generally positive reviews from English-language critics as well. The stories range in length, with the longest almost being classified as a novella, while the shortest are only one page.

== Background ==
Throughout a span of his career lasting around 40 years, Buzzati wrote approximately 500 works of short fiction. One of his Italian short story collections, Sessanta racconti (Sixty Stories), won the Strega Prize, the most prestigious in Italian literature, in 1958. Despite his prolific writing career and his success at home, only three collections had previously been published in English: Catastrophe in 1965, Restless Nights in 1983, and The Siren in 1984. The Bewitched Bourgeois' translator, Lawrence Venuti, was also the translator for Restless Nights; in its introduction, published over 40 years prior to The Bewitched Bourgeois, he commented that Buzzati had been "strangely neglected in the English-speaking world", while his popularity had endured in Europe, even outside of Italy.

== Publication and contents ==
The Bewitched Bourgeois is a collection of 50 of Buzzati's short stories, picked by Venuti. Some of the translations appearing in the book are entirely new, while others are retranslations, either of other translators' work or that of Venuti himself. It was published by NYRB Classics in January 2025.

Several stories in the collection were more frequently analyzed or mentioned as highlights. One is "Seven Floors", which follows a man who is driven to his death in a hospital by being sent from the top floor (which houses the healthiest patients) to the bottom (with those dying or dead), each time through a seemingly reasonable pretext or allowance for bureaucracy. (Note: Attributable to multiple sources:) It has been adapted into multiple different mediums, including a 1967 film and stage plays by Buzzati and Albert Camus.

The cover art for the collection is a Buzzati painting of a jacket hanging on a back of a chair, which is implied to have been abandoned in a hurry, in part due to the broken windows behind it. "The Jacket", a story in the collection, was one of Buzzati's more popular works, about a man who receives a jacket from a tailor that is seemingly stuffed with money received from various crimes. The titular story, "The Bewitched Bourgeois", is about a man who gets caught up in a children's game while on vacation, which ends with his death after taking the game so seriously that a pretend arrow becomes lethal.

"Panic at La Scala" is the longest story in the collection, described as being closer to a novella in length. A group of upper-class bourgeoisie barricade themselves in an Opera house in Milan out of fear of an upcoming left-wing revolution happening that night. It was inspired by an incident where a fascist student shot a communist politician, Palmiro Togliatti, leading to violent protests that resulted in 30 dead and upwards of 800 injured. Other stories, such as "The Caliph Awaits Us", are as short as one page.

=== List ===
Ch.	Title	Year	First published
1	Our Moment	1936	Il Convegno
2	Seven Floors	1937	La Lettura
3	The Shadow of the South	1939	Corriere della Sera
4	The Seven Messengers	1939	La Lettura
5	Personal Escort	1941	Corriere della Sera
6	The Bewitched Bourgeois	1942	Corriere della Sera
7	An Interrupted Story	1942	Corriere della Sera
8	Prank	1944	Corriere della Sera
9	The End of the World	1944	Corriere della Sera
10	Panic at La Scala	1948	L'Europeo
11	Appointment with Einstein	1950	Corriere della Sera
12	The Saucer Has Landed	1950	Corriere della Sera
13	The Survivor's Story	1950	In quel preciso momento
14	The Caliph Awaits Us	1950	In quel preciso momento
15	The Collapse of the Baliverna	1951	Corriere della Sera
16	The Five Brothers	1951	Corriere della Sera
17	The Time Machine	1952	Corriere della Sera
18	The Gnawing Work	1952	Corriere d'Informazione
19	The Walls of Anagoor	1954	Corriere della Sera
20	The Prohibited Word	1956	Corriere della Sera
21	Human Greatness	1956	Corriere della Sera
22	The Plague	1956	Corriere della Sera
23	The Writer's Secret	1958	Corriere della Sera
24	The Late Mistaken	1958	Corriere della Sera
25	The Flying Carpet	1958	Esperimento di magia
26	The Wind	1959	Corriere della Sera
27	Quiz at the Prison	1959	Corriere della Sera
28	Confidential	1960	Corriere della Sera
29	The Colomber	1961	Corriere della Sera
30	The Jacket	1962	Corriere della Sera
31	The Ubiquitous	1962	Corriere della Sera
32	The Elevator	1962	Corriere della Sera
33	The Falling Girl	1963	Corriere della Sera
34	The Eiffel Tower	1964	Corriere della Sera
35	The Scandal on Via Sesostri	1965	Corriere d'Informazione
36	Kafka's Houses	1965	Corriere della Sera
37	The Bogeyman	1967	Corriere della Sera
38	The Scriveners	1967	Corriere della Sera
39	What Will Happen On October 12th?	1967	Corriere della Sera
40	Elephantiasis	1967	Corriere della Sera
41	The Count's Wife	1967	Corriere della Sera
42	A Difficult Evening	1969	Corriere della Sera
43	Alienation	1969	Corriere della Sera
44	A Boring Letter	1970	Corriere della Sera
45	Stories in Tandem	1970	Corriere della Sera
46	A Solicitous Young Man	1971	Corriere della Sera
47	Stefano Caberlot, Writer	1974	Il Giornale nuovo
48	Alfredo Brilli, Accountant	1975	Il Racconto
49	Wladimiro Ferraris, Chief Customs Inspector	1985	Il reggimento parte all'alba
50	Why	1985	Il reggimento parte all'alba

== Reception ==
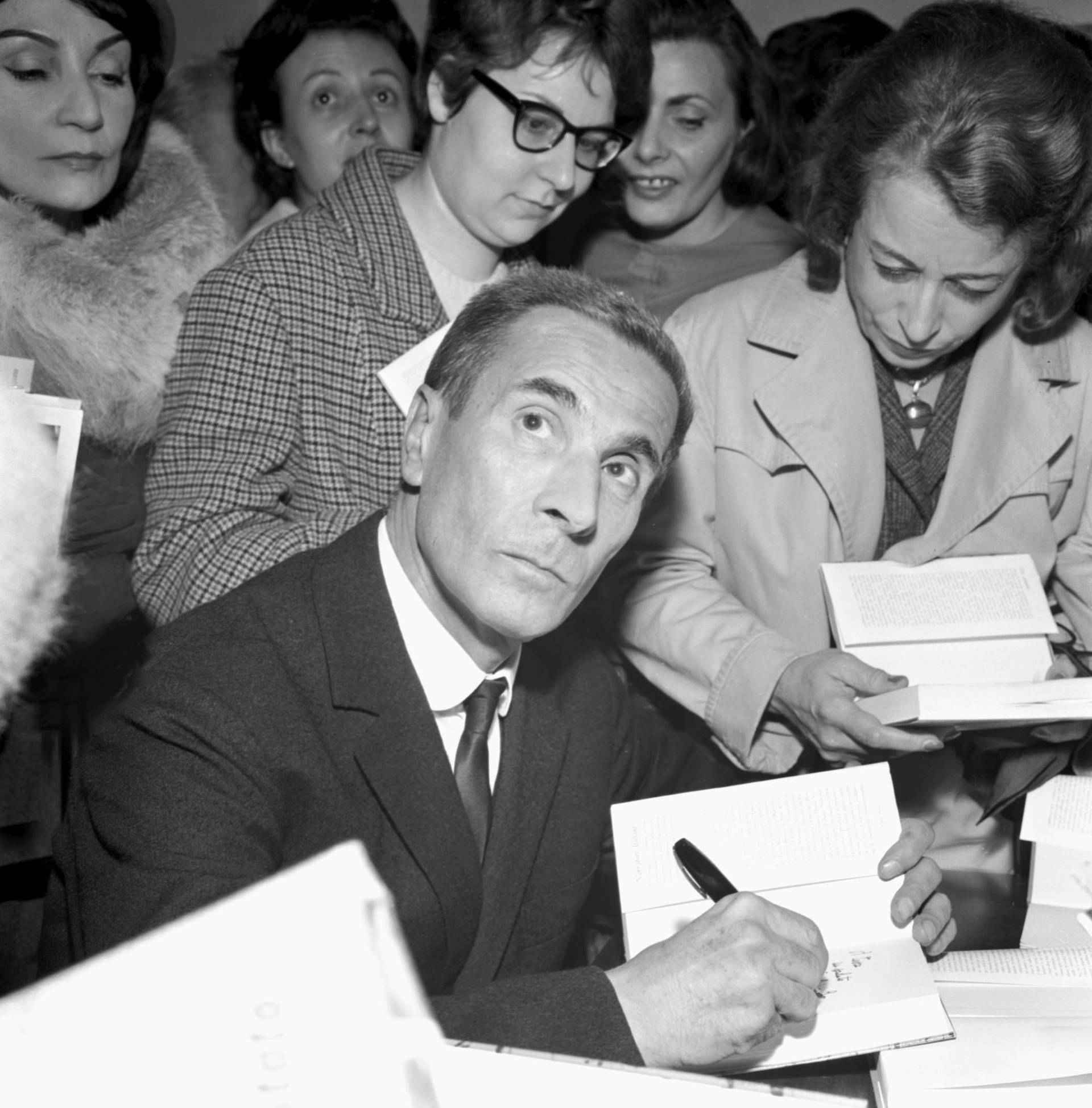
Buzzati signing his books at a bookstore in Milan in the 1960s

The Bewitched Bourgeois received generally positive reviews. A starred review from Publishers Weekly described the stories as "captivating", while also praising the quality of Venuti's translation and selection of stories. Valentina Polinci of the Los Angeles Review of Books wrote that it would soon be considered a "must-have volume". The earlier stories, such as "Seven Floors", were generally well received. Although appreciating "Panic at La Scala" as an example of Buzzati's longer fiction, The Times's John Self considered the short story (and the "very short story") to be his best works.

The New York Times Book Review's Jonathan Lethem was more mixed on the collection as a whole; he praised the early stories, such as "Seven Floors", "The Seven Messengers", "The Bewitched Bourgeois" and "Panic at La Scala", but felt that Buzzati's quality declined over time, and that too many of the included stories were from that late period, suggesting that fifty stories constituted "overexpos[ure]" and that forty stories would have been more appropriate. The Bewitched Bourgeois was still selected as an "Editor's Choice" staff pick by the Book Review, although with an emphasis on the quality of the early stories. Christopher Taylor of Harper's Magazine considered stories like "Panic at La Scala", "Seven Floors", and "The Seven Messengers" to be "working in the vein of" Jorge Luis Borges and Italo Calvino, but felt that they lacked the "mind-bending qualities" of their works.

== Analysis ==
Buzzati's work in general has a lengthy history of being compared to Franz Kafka's, which is reflected in this collection as well. Buzzati had commented that "[s]everal critics denounced my guilty similarities to Kafka even when I dispatched a telegram or filed my income tax return." According to The New York Times Book Review, several stories express some of Buzzati's own "permanent insecurity" about his career in Kafka's shadow. The Times compared him to a mix of Kafka and Roald Dahl. Comparisons to Calvino, Edgar Allan Poe, and Borges are also seen.

The New York Times Book Review considered Buzzati to have a "proclivity for hesitation, insecurity and shame", with him having been called "the bard of nervousness" in the past. He had been criticized for writing works that were "middlebrow", only causing "a bourgeois shudder", being designed to frighten the middle class in Italy. Whether or not middlebrow, which is primarily an anglophone term of controversial status, can be applied to an Italian writer's works is not clear or uncontroversial itself. More positively, Venuti described Buzzati's stories as "Poe and Kafka meet [...] The Twilight Zone."
