= Barnabo of the Mountains =

1933 novel by Dino Buzzati

- Bàrnabo delle montagne is the original book title in Italian
- Author: Dino Buzzati
- Original title: Bàrnabo delle montagne
- Publisher: Treves
- Publication date: 1933
- English publication date: 1984
- Pages: 187

Barnabo of the Mountains (Italian: Bàrnabo delle montagne) is a 1933 novel by the Italian writer Dino Buzzati. It tells the story of a young forest ranger who belongs to a community which guards a storage with explosives but is expelled after running away during a robber attack. It was Buzzati's first novel. An English translation is included in the book The Siren (1984).

The book was the basis for the 1994 film Barnabo of the Mountains, directed by Mario Brenta.
