= 1994 Cannes Film Festival =

- Official poster of the 47th Cannes Film Festival, adapted from an original drawing by Federico Fellini.
- Opening film: The Hudsucker Proxy
- Closing film: Serial Mom
- Location: Cannes, France
- Founded: 1946
- Awards: Palme d'Or: Pulp Fiction
- Hosted by: Jeanne Moreau
- No. of films: 23 (In Competition)
- Festival date: 12 May 1994 – 23 May 1994
- Website: festival-cannes.com/en

Cannes Film Festival
- 1995 1993

The 47th Cannes Film Festival took place from 12 to 23 May 1994. American filmmaker and actor Clint Eastwood served as jury president for the main competition. French actress Jeanne Moreau hosted the opening and closing ceremonies.

American filmmaker Quentin Tarantino won the Palme d'Or, the festival's top prize, for the comedy-drama film Pulp Fiction.

The festival opened with The Hudsucker Proxy by Joel Coen, and closed with Serial Mom by John Waters.

== Juries ==
=== Main competition ===
- Clint Eastwood, American filmmaker and actor - Jury President
- Pupi Avati, Italian filmmaker and producer
- Catherine Deneuve, French actress
- Guillermo Cabrera Infante, Cuban writer
- Kazuo Ishiguro, British writer
- Alexander Kaidanovsky, Russian actor and filmmaker
- Marie-Françoise Leclère, French journalist
- Lalo Schifrin, Argentine-American musician
- Shin Sang-ok, South Korean filmmaker and producer
- Alain Terzian, French-Armenian producer

=== Camera d'Or ===
- Marthe Keller, Swiss actress - Jury President
- Hans Beerekamp, Dutch journalist
- Josée Brossard, France
- Mario Dorminsky, Portugal
- An-Cha Flubacher Rhim, Switzerland
- François Ode, France
- Georges Pansu, France
- Jacques Zimmer, France

== Official selection ==
=== In Competition ===
The following feature films competed for the Palme d'Or:

| English title | Original title | Director(s) | Production Country |
|---|---|---|---|
| Assia and the Hen with the Golden Eggs | Курочка Ряба | Andrei Konchalovsky | Russia |
| Barnabo of the Mountains | Barnabo delle montagne | Mario Brenta | Italy |
| The Browning Version | | Mike Figgis | United Kingdom |
| Burnt by the Sun | Утомлённые солнцем | Nikita Mikhalkov | Russia, France |
| A Confucian Confusion | 獨立時代 | Edward Yang | Taiwan |
| Dead Tired | Grosse Fatigue | Michel Blanc | France |
| Dear Diary | Caro diario | Nanni Moretti | Italy, France |
| Exotica | | Atom Egoyan | Canada |
| The Hudsucker Proxy (opening film) | | Joel Coen | United States, United Kingdom |
| To Live | 活著 | Zhang Yimou | Hongkong |
| Mrs. Parker and the Vicious Circle | | Alan Rudolph | United States |
| My Own | Swaham | Shaji N. Karun | India |
| The Patriots | Les patriotes | Éric Rochant | France |
| Pulp Fiction | | Quentin Tarantino | United States |
| A Pure Formality | Una pura formalità | Giuseppe Tornatore | Italy, France |
| Queen Margot | La Reine Margot | Patrice Chéreau | France |
| The Queen of the Night | La reina de la noche | Arturo Ripstein | Mexico |
| Rice People | អ្នកស្រែ | Rithy Panh | Cambodia |
| Three Colours: Red | Trois couleurs: Rouge | Krzysztof Kieślowski | France, Poland, Switzerland |
| Through the Olive Trees | زیر درختان زیتون | Abbas Kiarostami | Iran |
| An Unforgettable Summer | O vară de neuitat | Lucian Pintilie | Romania, France |
| The Violin Player | Le joueur de violon | Charles Van Damme | France, Belgium |
| The Whores | Le buttane | Aurelio Grimaldi | Italy |

=== Un Certain Regard ===
The following films were selected for the competition of Un Certain Regard:

| English title | Original title | Director(s) | Production |
|---|---|---|---|
| The Adventures of Priscilla, Queen of the Desert | | Stephan Elliott | Australia |
| Bab El-Oued City | | Merzak Allouache | Algeria |
| Bosnia! | Bosna! | Bernard-Henri Lévy and Alain Ferrari | France |
| The Broken Journey | Uttoran | Sandip Ray | India |
| The Butterfly's Dream | Il sogno della farfalla | Marco Bellocchio | Italy |
| Clean, Shaven | | Lodge Kerrigan | United States |
| Cold Water | L'eau froide | Olivier Assayas | France |
| Down to Earth | Casa de Lava | Pedro Costa | Portugal |
| Dreamplay | Drømspel | Unni Straume | Norway |
| Faust | Lekce Faust | Jan Švankmajer | Czech Republic, France, United Kingdom, United States, Germany |
| I Can't Sleep | J'ai pas sommeil | Claire Denis | France |
| I Like It Like That | | Darnell Martin | United States |
| Johnnie Waterman | Jańcio Wodnik | Jan Jakub Kolski | Poland |
| Picture Bride | | Kayo Hatta | United States |
| The Shipwrecked | Los náufragos | Miguel Littin | Chile |
| Sleep with Me | | Rory Kelly | United States |
| The Story of Xinghua | 杏花三月天 | Li Yin | China |
| Suture | | Scott McGehee and David Siegel | United States |
| Wild Reeds | Les Roseaux sauvages | André Téchiné | France |
| Without Compassion | Sin compasión | Francisco José Lombardi | Peru |
| Xime | | Sana Na N'Hada | Guinea-Bissau |

=== Out of Competition ===
The following films were selected to be screened out of competition:

| English title | Original title | Director(s) | Production |
|---|---|---|---|
| Serial Mom (closing film) | | John Waters | United States |

=== Special Screenings ===
The following films were selected to receive a Special Screening:

| English title | Original title | Director(s) | Production |
|---|---|---|---|
| A Game with No Rules (short) | | Scott Reynolds | New Zealand |
| The Dig (short) | | Neil Pardington | New Zealand |
| The Dutch Master | | Susan Seidelman | Germany |
| Eau de la vie (short) | | Simon Baré | New Zealand |
| I'm So Lonesome I Could Cry (short) | | Michael Hurst | New Zealand |
| The Model (short) | | Jonathan Brough | New Zealand |
| Montand | | Jean Labib | France |
| Stroke (short) | | Christine Jeffs | New Zealand |
| Vanished | 증발 | Shin Sang-ok | South Korea |
| Wet | | Bob Rafelson | Germany |

=== Short Films Competition ===
The following short films competed for the Short Film Palme d'Or:

- Book of Dreams: Welcome to Crateland by Alex Proyas
- El héroe by Carlos Carrera
- Lemming Aid by Grant Lahood
- Parlez Après Le Signal Sonore by Olivier Jahan
- Passage by Raimund Krumme
- Sure To Rise by Niki Caro
- Syrup by Paul Unwin
- Una Strada Diritta Lunga by Werther Germondari, Maria Laura Spagnoli

== Parallel sections ==
=== Critics' Week ===
The following films were screened for the 33rd International Critics' Week (33e Semaine de la Critique):

| English title | Original title | Director(s) | Production |
In Competition
| Clerks | | Kevin Smith | United States |
| Curfew | Hatta Ishaar Akhar | Rashid Masharawi | Palestine, Netherlands |
| El Dirigible | | Pablo Dotta | Uruguay |
| It Will Never Be Spring | Wildgroei | Frouke Fokkema | Netherlands |
| Nightwatch | Nattevagten | Ole Bornedal | Denmark |
| See How They Fall | Regarde les hommes tomber | Jacques Audiard | France |
| Zinat | Zeenat | Ebrahim Mokhtari | Iran |
Short Films Competition
| Home Away From Home | | Maureen Blackwood | United Kingdom |
| Off Key | | Karethe Linaae | Canada |
| One Night Stand | | Bill Britten | United Kingdom |
| Performance Anxiety | | David Ewing | United States |
| Ponchada | | Alejandra Moya | Mexico |
| Poubelles | | Olias Barco | France |
| Los Salteadores | | Abi Feijo | Portugal |

=== Directors' Fortnight ===
The following films were screened for the Directors' Fortnight (Quinzaine des Réalizateurs):

| English title | Original title | Director(s) | Production |
|---|---|---|---|
| 71 Fragments of a Chronology of Chance | 71 Fragmente einer Chronologie des Zufalls | Michael Haneke | Austria, Germany |
| Amateur | | Hal Hartley | United States, United Kingdom, France |
| Back to Back, Face to Face | 背靠背，脸对脸 | Huang Jianxin | China |
| Bandit Queen | | Shekhar Kapur | India |
| The Box | A Caixa | Manoel de Oliveira | France, Portugal |
| Bye Bye America | Auf Wiedersehen Amerika | Jan Schütte | Germany |
| Coming to Terms with the Dead | Petits arrangements avec les morts | Pascale Ferran | France |
| Crows | Wrony | Dorota Kędzierzawska | Poland |
| Eat Drink Man Woman | 飲食男女 | Ang Lee | Taiwan, United States |
| Faut pas rire du bonheur | | Guillaume Nicloux | France |
| Fresh | | Boaz Yakin | United States |
| From the Snow | Απ' το χιόνι | Sotiris Goritsas | Greece |
| Katya Ismailova | Подмосковные вечера | Valery Todorovsky | Russia, France |
| Lovers | Les Amoureux | Catherine Corsini | France |
| Man, God, The Monster | MGM Sarajevo: Covjek, Bog, Monstrum | Ismet Arnautalic, Mirsad Idrizovic, Ademir Kenović | Bosnia and Herzegovina |
| Muriel's Wedding | | P. J. Hogan | Australia, France |
| No Skin | Senza pelle | Alessandro D'Alatri | Italy |
| The Silences of the Palace | صمت القصور | Moufida Tlatli | Tunisia |
| Take Care of Your Scarf, Tatiana | Pidä huivista kiinni, Tatjana | Aki Kaurismäki | Finland, Germany |
| Three Palm Trees | Três Palmeiras | João Botelho | Portugal |
| Too Much Happiness | Trop de bonheur | Cédric Kahn | France |

=== Short films ===
- 75 centilitres de prières by Jacques Maillot
- Deus ex machina by Vincent Mayrand
- Dimanche ou les fantômes by Laurent Achard
- Eternelles by Erick Zonca
- Troubles ou la journée d’une femme ordinaire by Laurent Bouhnik

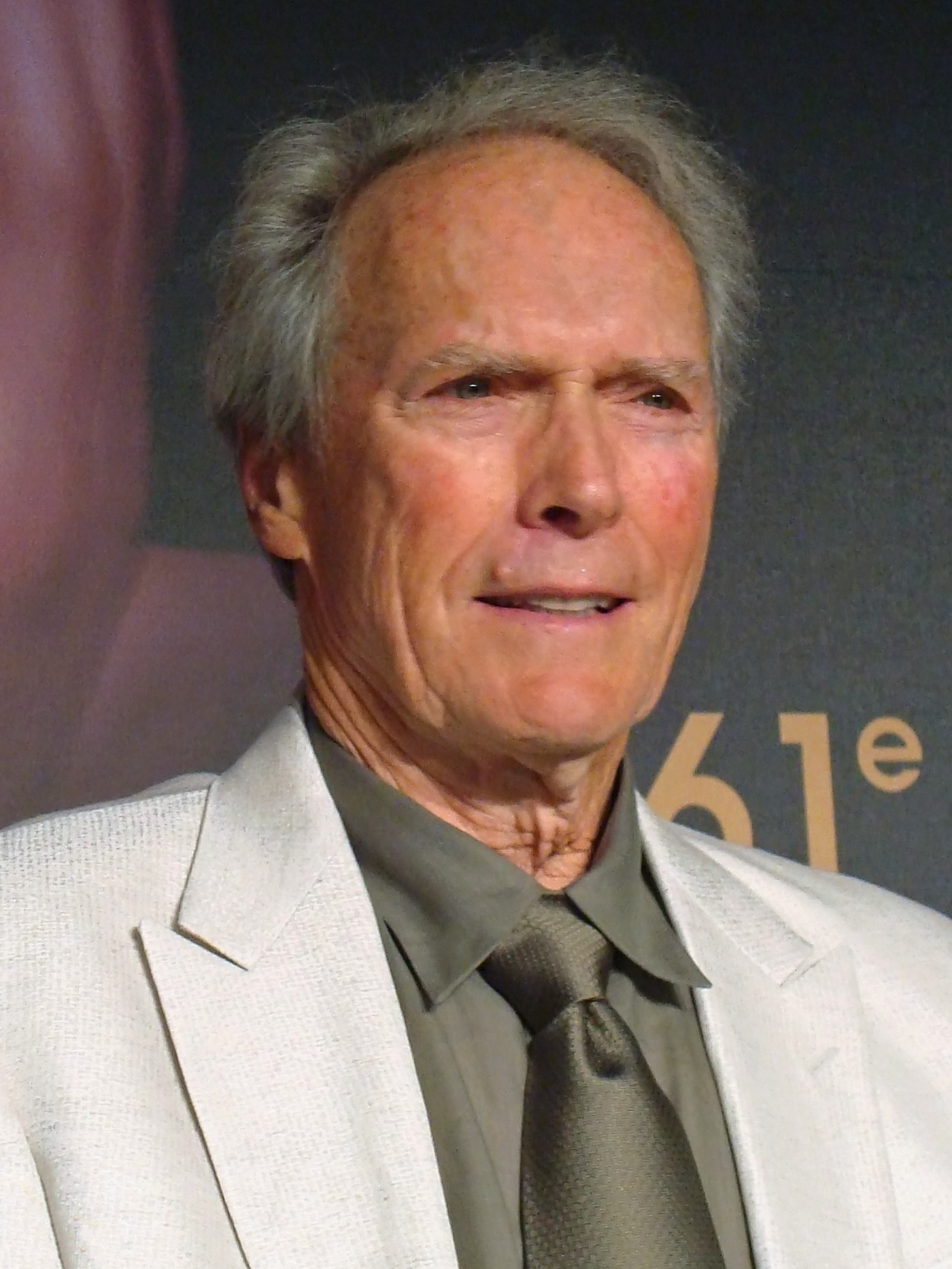
Clint Eastwood, Jury President

== Official Awards ==
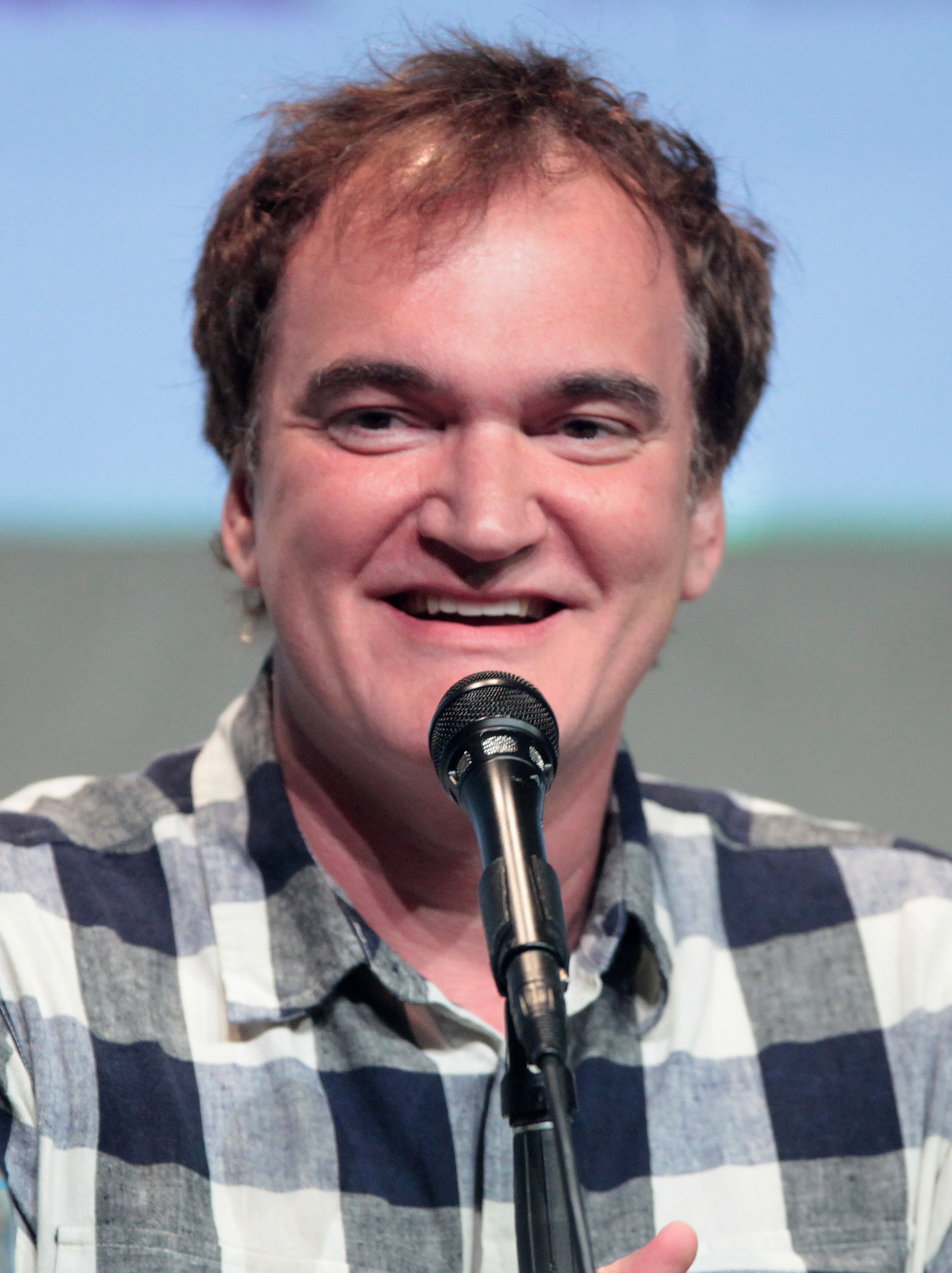
Quentin Tarantino, 1994 Palme d'Or winner

=== In Competition ===
- Palme d'Or: Pulp Fiction by Quentin Tarantino
- Grand Prize of the Jury:
  - To Live by Zhang Yimou
  - Burnt by the Sun by Nikita Mikhalkov
- Best Director: Nanni Moretti for Caro diario
- Best Screenplay: Michel Blanc for Dead Tired
- Best Actress: Virna Lisi for Queen Margot
- Best Actor: Ge You for To Live
- Jury Prize: Queen Margot by Patrice Chéreau

=== Caméra d'Or ===
- Coming to Terms with the Dead by Pascale Fairen
  - Special Mention: The Silences of the Palace by Moufida Tlatli

=== Short Film Palme d'Or ===
- El héroe by Carlos Carrera
- First Jury Prize: Lemming Aid by Grant Lahood
- Second Jury Prize: Syrup by Paul Unwin

== Independent Awards ==
=== FIPRESCI Prizes ===
- Exotica by Atom Egoyan (In competition)
- Bab El-Oued City by Merzak Allouache (Un Certain Regard)

=== Commission Supérieure Technique ===
- Technical Grand Prize: Pitof (special effects) in Dead Tired

=== Prize of the Ecumenical Jury ===
- To Live by Zhang Yimou
- Burnt by the Sun by Nikita Mikhalkov

=== Award of the Youth ===
- Foreign Film: Clerks by Kevin Smith
- French Film: Happy, Too Happy by Cédric Kahn

=== International Critics' Week ===
- Mercedes-Benz Award: Clerks by Kevin Smith
- Canal+ Award: Performance Anxiety by David Ewing
- Kodak Short Film Award: Éternelles by Erick Zonca

== Media ==
- INA: Opening of the 1994 Festival (commentary in French)
- INA: List of winners of the 1994 festival (commentary in French)
