= Une fenêtre ouverte =

2005 Senegalese documentary film

Une Fenêtre ouverte
- Directed by: Khady Sylla
- Written by: Khady Sylla
- Cinematography: Charles Van Damme
- Edited by: Amrita David
- Production companies: Guiss Guiss Communication; Athénaïse
- Release date: 2005
- Running time: 52 minutes
- Countries: France; Senegal
- Language: French

Une fenêtre ouverte (English: An open window) is a 2005 documentary film written and directed by Senegalese writer and filmmaker Khady Sylla. The film was a co-production by French company Athénaïse, as well as Guiss Guiss Communications, which is owned by Sylla's younger sister Mariama Sylla Faye. The film comes after an "unsatisfactory attempt" by Sylla to create a film capturing the numerous mentally ill people she encountered on the streets of Dakar.

== Synopsis ==
The documentary was filmed in Dakar, and centers on Sylla's relationship with an old friend named Aminta Ngom, as well as her experiences with her mental health. It consists primarily of conversations between Sylla and Ngom, interspersed with long confessionals feauring Sylla speaking directly to the camera. Sylla never identifies a specific mental illness or condition, instead referring to what she terms l’experience de la folie, or "the experience of madness". She explores the contrast between her own experience with Ngom's, whom she describes as exhibiting her madness freely, and whom becomes her "window to the world".

== Accolades ==
- Filmer à tout prix – Brussels International Film Festival 2006
- Best First Work Award – FIDMarseille 2005
