= Barnabo of the Mountains (film) =

1994 film

- Directed by: Mario Brenta
- Screenplay by: Mario Brenta; Francesco Alberti; Angelo Pasquini
- Based on: Bàrnabo delle montagne by Dino Buzzati
- Produced by: Tommaso Dazzi
- Starring: Marco Pauletti
- Cinematography: Vincenzo Marano
- Edited by: Roberto Missiroli
- Release date: 18 May 1994
- Running time: 124 minutes
- Country: Italy
- Language: Italian

Barnabo of the Mountains (Italian: Barnabo delle montagne) is a 1994 Italian drama film directed by Mario Brenta. It is based on Dino Buzzati's novel Bàrnabo delle montagne. It was entered into the 1994 Cannes Film Festival.

== Cast ==
- Marco Pauletti - Barnabo
- Duilio Fontana - Berton
- Carlo Caserotti - Molo
- Antonio Vecelio - Marden
- Angelo Chiesura - Del Colle
- Alessandra Milan - Ines
- Elisa Gasperini - Grandmother
- Marco Tonin - Darrio
- Francesca Rita Giovannini - Toni's Widow
- Pino Tosca - Emigrant's Leader
- Alessandro Uccelli - Young Emingrant
- Mario Da Pra - Inspector
- Gianni Bailo - Captain
- Daniele Zannantonio - Mayor
- Angelo Fausti - Haircutter
- Armando Cesco Gaspare - Forest Ranger
