= Singularity =

Singularity or singular point may refer to:

== Science, technology, and mathematics ==
=== Mathematics ===
- Mathematical singularity, a point at which a given mathematical object is not defined or not "well-behaved", for example infinite or not differentiable
  - Singular point of a curve, where the curve is not given by a smooth embedding of a parameter
  - Singular point of an algebraic variety, a point where an algebraic variety is not locally flat
  - Rational singularity

=== Natural sciences ===
- Singularity (system theory), in dynamical and social systems, a context in which a small change can cause a large effect
- Gravitational singularity, in general relativity, a point in which gravity is so intense that spacetime itself becomes ill-defined
  - Initial singularity, a hypothesized singularity of infinite density before quantum fluctuations caused the Big Bang and subsequent inflation that created the Universe
- Penrose–Hawking singularity theorems, in general relativity theory, theorems about how gravitation produces singularities such as in black holes
- Prandtl–Glauert singularity, the point at which a sudden drop in air pressure occurs
- Singularity (climate), a weather phenomenon associated with a specific calendar date
- Van Hove singularity in the density of states of a material

=== Technology ===
- Singularity (operating system), an experimental operating system developed by Microsoft Research
- Mechanical singularity, a position or configuration of a mechanism or a machine where the subsequent behavior cannot be predicted
- Apptainer, a container technology formerly called Singularity that does not require root permissions to run

=== Futurology ===
- Technological singularity, a hypothetical point in time when technological growth becomes uncontrollable and irreversible

== Arts and entertainment ==
=== Film and television ===
- "Singularity", a first-season episode of Disney's So Weird
- "Singularity" (Star Trek: Enterprise), a second-season episode of Star Trek: Enterprise
- "The Singularity" (Agents of S.H.I.E.L.D.), a third-season episode of Agents of S.H.I.E.L.D.
- "Singularity", a first-season episode of Stargate SG-1
- The Singularity (film), a 2012 documentary about the technological singularity
- Singularity (2017 film), American science fiction film starring John Cusack
- Singularity, the working title for The Lovers, starring Josh Hartnett and Bipasha Basu
- Godzilla Singular Point, a 2021 Japanese anime surrounding Godzilla
- Singularity, a short film developing from the Open Project (codenamed: Gold) by the Blender Institute

=== Literature ===
- Singularity (Sleator novel), a 1985 science-fiction novel by William Sleator
- Singularity (DeSmedt novel), 2004, by Bill DeSmedt
- Singularity (audio drama), a 2005 Doctor Who audio drama
- Singularity 7, a graphic novel by Ben Templesmith
- The Singularity Is Near, a 2005 book by Ray Kurzweil on the technological singularity
- The Singularity Is Nearer, a 2024 sequel to Ray Kurzweil's 2005 book
- Singularity (comics), the Marvel Comics character
- Singularity, a 2023 novel by Jeremy Robinson, the finale of the "Infinite Timeline"
- The Singularity, Anne Milano Appel's 2024 English translation of Dino Buzzati's 1960 novel Il grande ritratto (Larger than Life)

=== Music ===
==== Albums ====
- Singularity (Joe Morris album), 2001
- Singularity (Peter Hammill album), 2006
- Singularity (Mae album), 2007
- Singularity (Robby Krieger album), 2010
- Singularity (Northlane album), 2013
- Singularity (Jon Hopkins album), 2018
- Singularity, a 2014 EP by Lemaitre
- The Singularity (Phase I – Neohumanity), 2014, by Swedish metal band Scar Symmetry
- Singularity (Lead album), 2020

==== Songs ====
- "Singularity" (song), performed by V of the South Korean group BTS from their 2018 album Love Yourself: Tear
- "Singularity", by Believer on the 1993 album Dimensions
- "Singularity", by Born of Osiris on the 2011 album The Discovery
- "Singularity", by Caligula's Horse on the 2011 album Moments from Ephemeral City
- "Singularity", by Devin Townsend on the 2019 album Empath
- "Singularity", by New Order on the 2015 album Music Complete
- "Singularity," by Red on the 2017 album Gone
- "Singularity", by Steve Aoki & Angger Dimas featuring My Name Is Kay from It's the End of the World as We Know It, 2013
- "Singularity", by Tesseract on the 2013 album Altered State
- "Singularity", by Textures on the 2011 album Dualism
- "Singularity", by The Lisps on the 2011 album "Are We At the Movies?"

==== People ====
- Grey's Kyle Trewartha, known by the stage name "Singularity"

=== Video games ===
- Singularity (video game), 2010, developed by Raven Software

== Organizations ==
- Singularity University, a California Benefit Corporation part think-tank, part business incubator, based on Ray Kurzweil's theory of technological singularity
- Machine Intelligence Research Institute (MIRI), formerly "The Singularity Institute for Artificial Intelligence" (SIAI)
  - Singularity Summit, its annual conference

== See also ==
- Singular (disambiguation)
