= Il colombre =

- First edition
- Author: Dino Buzzati
- Language: Italian
- Publisher: Arnoldo Mondadori Editore
- Publication date: 1966
- Publication place: Italy
- Pages: 451

Il colombre is a 1966 short story collection by the Italian writer Dino Buzzati. The titular story introduces a sea monster called the colomber, which became the most famous of Buzzati's monster characters.

== Stories ==
1. Il colombre: storia non vera
2. La creazione
3. La lezione del 1980
4. Generale ignoto
5. L'erroneo fu
6. L'umiltà
7. E se?
8. Riservatissima al signor direttore
9. L'arma segreta
10. Un torbido amore
11. Povero bambino!
12. Il seccatore
13. Il conto
14. Week-end
15. Il segreto dello scrittore
16. Storielle della sera
17. Cacciatori di vecchi
18. L'uovo
19. Diciottesima buca
20. La giacca stregata
21. Il cane vuoto
22. Dolce notte
23. L'ascensore
24. I sorpassi
25. L'ubiquo
26. Il vento
27. Teddy boys
28. Il palloncino
29. Suicidio al parco
30. Il crollo del santo
31. Schiavo
32. La torre Eiffel
33. Ragazza che precipita
34. Il mago
35. La barattola
36. L'altare
37. Le gobbe in giardino
38. Piccola Circe
39. Il logorio
40. Quiz all'ergastolo
41. Jago
42. Progressioni
43. I due autisti

Viaggio agli inferni del secolo

1. I - Un servizio difficile
2. II - I segreti della <<MM>>
3. III - Le diavolesse
4. IV - Le accelerazioni
5. V - Le solitudini
6. VI - L'Entrümpelung
7. VII - Belva al volante
8. VIII - Il giardino

== Publication ==
The collection was published in Italy in 1966 through Arnoldo Mondadori Editore. It has not been published in English in its entirety, but some of the stories, including "Colomber", have been translated by Lawrence Venuti and appear in the 1984 volume Restless Nights: Selected Stories of Dino Buzzati.
