= Seven Floors =

1937 short story by Dino Buzzati

- Short story by Dino Buzzati
- Cover of the March 1937 edition of La Lettura where Seven Floors was first published
- Original title: Sette piani
- Country: Italy
- Language: Italian
- Genre: Short story

Publication
- Published in: La Lettura
- Publication date: 1937
- Pages: 16 (Note: In English, in The Bewitched Bourgeois.)

"Seven Floors" (Italian: Sette piani) is a short story by Italian author Dino Buzzati, first published in La Lettura in 1937. It was later part of multiple short story collections, including Sessanta racconti, which won the Strega Prize in 1958. It was first translated into English in 1965 in a collection named Catastrophe. In the years since its first publication it has been adapted into multiple different mediums, including film, theater, and radio plays.

== Plot ==
"Seven Floors" follows Giovanni Corte, a man who goes to a hospital for treatment from an unnamed illness. The hospital is a specialty facility for treating the disease. He learns from a neighbor that it organizes itself into seven floors, each for a different class of patients, ranked by the severity of their symptoms, the progression of the disease, and the treatments that can be provided. Those with the lightest symptoms are at the top, on the seventh floor, and the patients on each floor below are progressively more ill, to the point where those who are dying are on the first floor; shutters closing on the first floor windows indicate that a patient in that room has died as recently as that day.

A little over a week later, a mother with two children arrives. Two rooms next to him were free, and he was asked if he would concede his room and head down to the sixth floor so that she would not need to separate from her children. The floor's doctor emphasized that his case was mild, and this was solely for the comfort of the family, and he should be able to return to the seventh floor within a few days. Corte agreed to move down to the next floor, although he was aware that, despite the doctor's claims, he would have to make an effort to get transferred back to the seventh floor instead of being considered "sick enough" to stay on the sixth floor, and made a deliberate effort to explain to other patients on the floor that he was only there on a temporary basis, as a favor to the doctor and another family.

Despite his reservations, he gets moved down to lower floors again and again due to hospital bureaucracy and seemingly reasonable pretexts. Heading to the fifth floor, a clerical error seemingly included him among the more ill patients on the sixth. Caught up in a system he is unable to truly control and with people that all seem to be making reasonable objections, and despite his best efforts, he eventually makes it to the second floor, for treatment from a doctor who is currently out-of-office on vacation. A note from that away doctor consigns him to the first floor. After raging against his circumstances in his first floor room, he begins to see the world going dark, despite it being the middle of the afternoon. As his consciousness fades, he sees the shutters on his window begin to descend.

== Publication history ==
"Seven Floors" was first published in Italian in the March 1937 edition of La Lettura, a literary supplement of the Corriere della Sera, the newspaper where Buzzati was employed for the majority of his life and career. It was later published in Buzzati's anthology The Seven Messengers, and then re-edited to more closely resemble the original version as part of his Strega Prize-winning short story collection Sessanta racconti (Sixty Stories).

It was first published in English in the short story collection Catastrophe in 1965, translated by Judith Landry. Landry retranslated the collection, including "Seven Floors", in a 2018 reissuing; it was republished again with a new translation by Lawrence Venuti in the collection The Bewitched Bourgeois in 2025.

== Analysis ==
"Seven Floors" has been seen as a parable about the inevitability of death, an allegory for human life, and futility & fate. When Corte enters the hospital his fate is sealed, and he sees himself slowly but surely pulled down from the healthy top to the terminally ill bottom. Although Corte knows that death is a real phenomenon, he does not see it as something that happens to him in particular. Some critics have stated that he is essentially led to death by hypochondria. The Times wrote that it speaks to those who have "felt their life spin out of control".

Despite its grim nature, it resembles a comedy; The New York Sun described it as a "comedy of errors" in particular. As the medical professionals Corte encounters all find different seemingly-reasonable pretexts, Corte is consigned to the "punch line" of his death. This has been compared to one of Buzzati's most-known works, The Tartar Steppe (or The Stronghold), where Giovanni Drogo finds himself trapped at a life-long sentence at an out-of-the-way military installation, waiting for an enemy that does not arrive.

== Reception ==
Critical reception for "Seven Floors" has been positive. Publishers Weekly chose it as a highlighted example in a starred review of the collection The Bewitched Bourgeois. The New York Times Book Review and The New York Sun both considered "Seven Floors" to be a highlight among the best of Buzzati's early work included there. The Western Daily Press described a previous radio adaptation as "harrowing", and the original story itself was "even more powerful".

== Adaptations and legacy ==
"Seven Floors" was adapted into a stage play by Buzzati under the title Un caso clinico (A Clinical Case) in 1953, which was later adapted into French by Albert Camus in 1955 as Un cas intéresant (An Interesting Case). These adaptations have been used as subjects of examination in how short stories can be adapted for theater. Although the play has never been officially published in English, one such adaptation was performed by a Minneapolis-based theater troupe in 1975.

Further adaptations include a 1967 film titled The Seventh Floor, directed by and starring Ugo Tognazzi, as well as a radio drama that aired on the BBC in 1961, produced by Martin Esslin.
