= The Secret of the Old Woods =

- Directed by: Ermanno Olmi
- Screenplay by: Ermanno Olmi
- Based on: Il segreto del Bosco Vecchio by Dino Buzzati
- Produced by: Mario Cecchi Gori, Vittorio Cecchi Gori
- Starring: Paolo Villaggio; Giulio Brogi
- Cinematography: Dante Spinotti
- Edited by: Fabio Olmi
- Music by: Franco Piersanti
- Distributed by: Variety Distribution
- Release date: 1993
- Running time: 134 minutes
- Country: Italy
- Language: Italian

The Secret of the Old Woods (Italian: Il segreto del bosco vecchio) is a 1993 Italian fantastic drama film written, directed and starred by Ermanno Olmi. It is based on the novel with the same name by Dino Buzzati.

For his performance Paolo Villaggio won the Nastro d'Argento for best actor. The film also won the David di Donatello for best cinematography.

== Plot ==
The general Sebastiano Procolo lives in a little village in the mountains boundless, in a small wooden house near a dense forest, called the "Old Woods". He is there on behalf of his nephew, owner of the reserve; however the general has the ambition to destroy all the trees in order to enrich. One night he discovers that the forest is inhabited by strange invisible creatures that whisper continually being released to resume again in the power of the ancient forest. Sebastiano initially don't understand the situation, but after as in a dream vision he realizes that these creatures have been imprisoned long ago by himself.

== Cast ==
- Paolo Villaggio as Sebastiano Procolo
- Giulio Brogi as Bernardi
- Riccardo Zannantonio as Benvenuto Procolo
- Lino Pais Marden as Giovanni Aiuti

== See also ==
- List of Italian films of 1993
