= Poem Strip =

1969 comic book by Dino Buzzati

Poem Strip (Poema a fumetti)
- First edition cover
- Date: 1969
- Page count: 222 pages
- Publisher: Arnoldo Mondadori Editore

Creative team
- Creator: Dino Buzzati

Translation
- Date: 6 October 2009
- Translator: Marina Harss

Poem Strip (Italian: Poema a fumetti) is a 1969 comic book by the Italian writer and illustrator Dino Buzzati. It retells the myth of Orpheus and Eurydice, set in Milan in the 1960s. The aesthetics are influenced by 1960s pop culture. An English translation by Marina Harss was published in 2009.

== Reception ==
Richard Rayner of Los Angeles Times wrote in 2009: "The images are surreal, sexy and frightening, and the text (translated here for the first time into English by Marina Harss, with lettering by Rich Tommaso) is both compelling and poetic. There are shades of Fellini, shades of Dickens, shades of the great Italian horror director Mario Bava. A beautiful book." Publishers Weekly wrote: "The text might have lost some of its lyricism in the translation from the Italian, as it occasionally seems stiff. The artwork retains its bold, sensual power, however."

== Adaptation ==
The comic was the basis for the 2025 film Orfeo directed by Virgilio Villoresi.
