= Mariama Sylla Faye =

Senegalese film director

Mariama Sylla
- Born: Dakar
- Occupations: Film director, film producer
- Relatives: Khady Sylla

Mariama Sylla Faye is a Senegalese film director and producer.

== Biography ==
Sylla was born in Dakar and is the younger sister of the writer and filmmaker Khady Sylla. Her mother worked in the cinema office, and Sylla became passionate about cinema at the age of seven, as many films were screened in the family courtyard.

Sylla founded the production company Guiss Guiss Communication in 2003. She directed the short film Dakar Deuk Raw in 2008, which examined the ancient tribe of Lesbous in Dakar. In 2010, Sylla directed Skirmisher Marc Gueye: My Pen, My Fight, about a veteran of the First Indochina War.

Sylla served as co-director of the 2014 film Une simple parole alongside her sister Khady, and finished it when Khady died. The film examines the storytelling tradition in Senegal and received the Diversity Award from the Women's International Film and Television Showcase.

Sylla is married to the journalist Modou Mamoune Faye.

== Filmography ==
- 2005 : Derrière le silence (director)
- 2006 : Hors Série (director)
- 2008 : Dakar Deuk Raw (short film, director)
- 2010 : Skirmisher Marc Gueye: My Pen, My Fight (director)
- 2014 : Une simple parole (co-director)
