= Unni Straume =

Norwegian film director

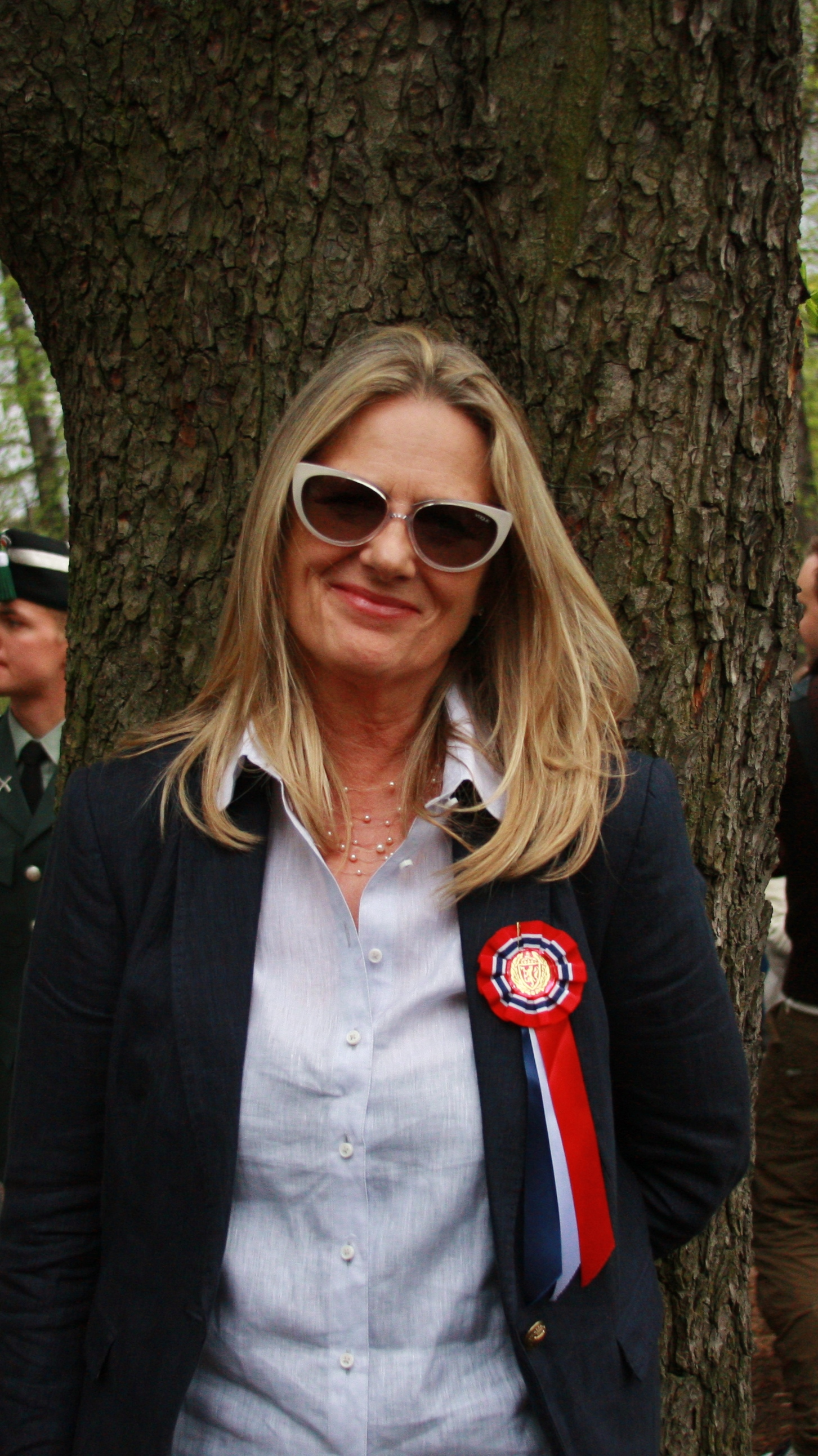
- Born: 2 October 1955 (age 70)
- Occupations: Film director Screenwriter
- Years active: 1990-present

Unni Straume (born 2 October 1955) is a Norwegian film director and screenwriter. Her film Drømspel was screened in the Un Certain Regard section at the 1994 Cannes Film Festival.

== Filmography ==
=== Director ===
- Kystkunst (1977)
- Trubadur (1978). Documentary about the Norwegian musician Jan Eggum.
- Kap Farvel (1981). Documentary about shrimps fishing in the Barent's sea.
- Hot House (1982). Documentary about jazz in Oslo.
- Bilete frå ei øy (1983)
- Roma Con Amore (1984)
- Way North. Fem norske kunstnere (1986)
- Pjuska (1988). Documentary about a cat.
- Til en ukjent (1990). Autobiographic, in black and white.
- Avsporing (1993). Shortmovie, presented in Cannes Film Festival.
- Drømspel (1994). Presented at Cannes Film Festival for Un Certain Regard
- T83 (1995). 13 min, about a travel to Orte, Italy.
- Thranes metode (1998). From Thranes metode og andre noveller by Øystein Lønn.
- Pappasøndag (1999). shortmovie directed in Italia.
- Musikk for bryllup og begravelser (2002). Nominated for Nordisk Råds filmpris (2002). Soundtrack by Goran Bregović. Presented at the Venice Film Festival.
- REMAKE.me (2014). Autobiographic movie with cuts from other of her own movies and scenes filmed in: Fiksdal, Terracina, Oslo and Rome.
