= The Seventh Floor (1967 film) =

1967 film

- Film poster
- Directed by: Ugo Tognazzi
- Screenplay by: Ugo Tognazzi; Rafael Azcona
- Based on: "Sette piani" by Dino Buzzati
- Produced by: Henryk Chrosicki; Alfonso Sansone; Ugo Tognazzi
- Starring: Ugo Tognazzi
- Cinematography: Enzo Serafin
- Edited by: Eraldo Da Roma
- Music by: Teo Usuelli
- Release date: 22 March 1967
- Running time: 108 minutes
- Country: Italy
- Language: Italian

The Seventh Floor (Italian: Il fischio al naso) is a 1967 Italian comedy film directed by and starring Ugo Tognazzi. It is based on the short story "Sette piani" ("Seven Floors") by Dino Buzzati, featured in the 1942 short story collection The Seven Messengers. The film was entered into the 17th Berlin International Film Festival.

== Cast ==
- Ugo Tognazzi as Giuseppe Inzerna
- Tina Louise as Dr. Immer Mehr
- Olga Villi as Anita, Inzerna wife
- Franca Bettoia as Giovanna, Inzerna's lover
- Alicia Brandet as Gloria, Inzerna's daughter
- Gildo Tognazzi as Gerolamo, Inzerna's father
- Alessandro Quasimodo
- Gigi Ballista as Dr. Claretta
- Riccardo Garrone as Barbiere
- Marco Ferreri as Dr. Salamoia
