= Henry Reed (poet) =

English poet, translator, radio dramatist and journalist

- Born: 22 February 1914; Birmingham, England
- Died: 8 December 1986 (aged 72)
- Education: University of Birmingham
- Occupations: Poet, translator, radio dramatist and journalist
- Writing career
- Notable work: Lessons of the War

Henry Reed (22 February 1914 – 8 December 1986) was a British poet, translator, radio dramatist and journalist.

== Life and work ==
Reed was born in Birmingham and was educated at King Edward VI School, Aston, followed by the University of Birmingham. At university he associated with W. H. Auden, Louis MacNeice and Walter Allen. He went on to study for an MA and then worked as a teacher and journalist. He was called up to the Army in 1941, spending most of the war as a Japanese translator. Although he had studied French and Italian at university and taught himself Greek at school, Reed did not take to Japanese, perhaps because he had learned an almost entirely military vocabulary. Walter Allen, in his autobiography As I Walked down New Grub Street, said Reed intended "to devote every day for the rest of his life to forgetting another word of Japanese."

After the war, Reed worked for the BBC as a radio broadcaster, translator and playwright, where his most memorable set of productions was the Hilda Tablet series in the 1950s, produced by Douglas Cleverdon. The series started with A Very Great Man Indeed, which purported to be a documentary about the research for a biography of a dead poet and novelist called Richard Shewin. This drew in part on Reed's own experience of researching a biography of the novelist Thomas Hardy. However, the "twelve-tone composeress" Hilda Tablet, a friend of Richard Shewin, became the most interesting character in the play; and in the next play, she persuades the biographer to change the subject of the biography to her – telling him "not more than twelve volumes". Dame Hilda, as she later became, was based partly on Ethel Smyth and partly on Elisabeth Lutyens (who was not pleased, and considered legal action).

Another of his radio plays, The Streets of Pompeii, also produced by Cleverdon, with Marius Goring and Flora Robson in the lead roles, was broadcast on the BBC Third Programme in April 1952. It won the Prix Italia in Palermo in 1953.

Reed's most famous poetry is in Lessons of the War, originally three poems that are witty parodies of British army basic training during World War II. Originally published in New Statesman and Nation (August 1942), the series was later published in A Map of Verona in 1946, which was his only collection published in his lifetime. "Naming of Parts", the first poem in Lessons of the War, was also taught in schools. Three further poems have subsequently been added to the set. Another often-anthologised poem is "Chard Whitlow: Mr. Eliot's Sunday Evening Postscript", a satire of T. S. Eliot's Burnt Norton. Eliot himself was amused by "Chard Whitlow"'s mournful imitations of his poetic style ("As we get older we do not get any younger ...").

Reed made a radio programme, reading all of Lessons of the War, which was broadcast on the BBC's Third Programme on 14 February 1966.

He was often confused with the poet and critic Herbert Read (1893–1968); the two men were unrelated. Reed responded to this confusion by naming his "alter ego" biographer in the Hilda Tablet plays "Herbert Reeve" and then by having everyone get the name slightly wrong.

The Papers of Henry Reed are kept in the University of Birmingham Library Special Collections.

== Translations ==
- Honoré de Balzac, Père Goriot (New York: New American Library, 1962)
- Honoré de Balzac, Eugénie Grandet (New York: New American Library, 1964)
- Ugo Betti, The Queen and the Rebels, The Burnt Flower-Bed, Summertime, in Three Plays by Ugo Betti (New York: Grove Press, 1958)
- Ugo Betti, Crime on Goat Island, staged as Island of Goats in New York City (1955); published by Samuel French (1960)
- Ugo Betti, Corruption in the Palace of Justice, staged in New York City (1963)
- Dino Buzzati, Larger than Life (London: Secker & Warburg, 1962)
- Natalia Ginzburg, The Advertisement, staged at the National Theatre, London (1969)
- Giacomo Leopardi, Chorus of the Dead, poem broadcast by BBC radio on 6 February 1949; published in The Listener, 28 April 1949
- Giacomo Leopardi, The Infinite, poem broadcast by BBC radio on January 12, 1975; published in The Listener, 1 June 1950
- Paride Rombi, Perdu and his Father (London: Hart Davis, 1954)
