= Azul Oscuro, Azul Celeste =

2026 Mexican documentary film about Cruz Azul

- Theatrical release poster
- Directed by: Carlos Bátiz; Carlos Carrera
- Written by: Alejandro Gerber Bicecci; Silvia Pasternac
- Produced by: Carlos Bátiz
- Cinematography: Junior Gonzalez; Vidblain Balvas
- Edited by: Arturo González Alonso; Daniel Paz; Rodrigo Ríos
- Music by: Javier Baca
- Production company: Creative Show
- Distributed by: Art Kingdom; Cinemex
- Release dates: 18 April 2026 (Guadalajara International Film Festival); 28 May 2026 (Mexico)
- Running time: 100 minutes
- Country: Mexico
- Language: Spanish

Azul Oscuro, Azul Celeste is a 2026 Mexican documentary film directed by Carlos Carrera and Carlos Bátiz. It examines the internal conflicts of the cement cooperative Cooperativa La Cruz Azul and its football club, Cruz Azul, during the administration of Guillermo "Billy" Álvarez Cuevas, as well as the efforts of cooperative members to regain control of the organisation.

Development began in late 2020, when the project was conceived as a documentary series. The film premiered at the 41st Guadalajara International Film Festival on 18 April 2026 and was released in Cinemex cinemas on 28 May. It became available on the streaming channel Filmelier+ in October 2026.

== Synopsis ==
The film opens with cruzazulear, a colloquial Mexican verb coined after the club's repeated defeats in decisive matches. Bátiz described the term as a symbolic explanation of what was happening inside the cooperative, not only within the football team. It traces the club's beginnings among cement workers in the Segunda División and its rise to the top of Mexican football, alongside the internal disputes and financial irregularities that later affected the cooperative.

The narrative centres on Álvarez's administration from 1988 to 2020 and on the allegations of corruption, money laundering, tax fraud and organised crime connected with that period. It also follows the struggle of cooperative members to recover control of the institution. Rather than centring the story on a single figure, the directors chose to tell it collectively through the cooperative, interviewing more than 150 of its members. Other participants include former executives and investigative journalists. Among those interviewed are Víctor Velázquez, president of the cooperative's board of directors and of the club, and former defender Julio César Domínguez, who recounts threats his family received during his career. Historical photographs of the cooperative appear throughout, and re-enactments based on period documents reconstruct episodes from the administration and the cooperative's origins. The film contrasts the club's difficult years with its recent sporting resurgence.

== Production ==
Bátiz, a Cruz Azul supporter, met members of the cooperative through a friend who worked with them. After hearing their account, he decided the story should be told on film. He invited Carrera, director of El crimen del padre Amaro, to co-direct. The two had known each other for more than 20 years, and Bátiz described the documentary as their first full collaboration. Carrera said that although he was not a devoted football fan, the human and structural story behind the club drew him in, as he saw it as a reflection of Mexico.

Development began in late 2020, during the COVID-19 pandemic, which slowed the process. The project was initially conceived as a documentary series before being reworked into a feature film. The filmmakers paused work while waiting for a conclusive ending. According to Bátiz, arrest warrants had been issued, but no one had been detained and none of the cooperative's plants had been recovered. Production resumed after arrests were made and plants were recovered in the final year of development. The film was completed about a month before its theatrical release.

To reconstruct the cooperative's history, the production team hired a historian to search newspaper archives. At the same time, it negotiated broadcast rights to the club's historic matches. Carrera said the directors aimed to balance the sporting and institutional stories, making neither a purely football film nor a crime report.

== Release ==
On 2 April 2026, Cinemex and Cruz Azul announced the documentary and released its trailer. The trailer showed key moments within the cooperative alongside sporting episodes such as the team's late defeats. Promotional material used the tagline La dictadura construida en cemento ("The dictatorship built in cement"). The documentary premiered on 18 April at the Guadalajara International Film Festival, which ran from 17 to 25 April. The film was released exclusively in Cinemex cinemas across Mexico on 28 May, days after Cruz Azul won the Clausura 2026 Liga MX title.

Álvarez, who had been held in pre-trial detention since January 2025 on organised crime and money-laundering charges, died on 30 May 2026, two days after the documentary reached cinemas.

On 15 October 2026, the film became available exclusively on the streaming channel Filmelier+, accessible through Amazon Prime Video, Apple TV and Roku.
