= Marie-Françoise Leclère =

French journalist (1942–2021)

- Born: 1942
- Died: 27 April 2021 (aged 79)
- Occupation: journalist

Marie-Françoise Leclère (20 April 1942 – 27 April 2021) was a French journalist at Elle and Le Point. She was also the co-writer of José Pinheiro's film, Les Mots pour le dire, released on 12 October 1983. She was jury at the 1994 Cannes Film Festival.

Leclère first started being involved in journalism after becoming an assistant editor at Elle after being introduced to the position by Hélène Lazareff. The later went onto join Le Point in the 1970's and later became editor-in-chief for the department covering culture by 2007.

She was the wife of Lucien Bodard. Leclère died in April 2021, aged 79, from cancer.

== Biography ==
She co-wrote the screenplay for José Pinheiro (director) film Les Mots pour le dire, which was released on October 12, 1983.

In 1994, she was a member of the jury at the Cannes Film Festival.

She died on April 27, 2021 at the age of 79 from an aggressive form of cancer.
