= Milo De Angelis =

Italian language poet

Milo De Angelis*
- Born: 1951 (age 74–75); Milan, Italy
- Occupations: Poet and Novelist
- Writing career
- Period: 1976-present

Milo De Angelis (born 1951) is an Italian language poet. He is the author of several books of poetry, as well as a volume of stories and one of essays. He has also published translations of several modern French authors and Greek classics. He was born in Milan in 1951. His first collection of poetry was entitled Somiglianze (1976).

== Works ==
=== Poetry ===
- Somiglianze (Resemblances), Guanda, Parma, 1975 (new ed. 1990)
- Millimetri (Millimetres), Einaudi, Torino, 1983
- Terra del viso (Face's Land), Mondadori, Milano, 1985
- Distante un padre (An Aloof Father), Mondadori, Milano, 1989
- Biografia sommaria (Concise Biography), Mondadori, Milano, 1998
- Dove eravamo già stati. Poesie 1970-2001 (Where We Had Already Been. Poems 1970-2001), Donzelli, Rome, 2001
- Tema dell’addio (Farewell Theme), Mondadori, Milano, 2005 (Viareggio Prize, San Pellegrino Prize, Cattafi Prize)

=== Prose ===
- La corsa dei mantelli (The Cloaks Race), Guanda, Parma, 1979
- Poesia e destino (Poetry and Fate), Cappelli, Bologna, 1982

=== Translations ===
- Milo De Angelis, Terre du visage, trans. I. N. Para, Chopard, Paris, 1988.
- Milo De Angelis, Ce que je raconte aux chaises, trans. A. Pilia and J. Demarcq, Luzarches, Les Cahiers de Royaumont, 1989.
- Milo De Angelis, Finite Intuition. Selected Poetry and Prose, trans. Lawrence Venuti, Sun and Moon, New York, 1995.
- Milo De Angelis, Between the Blast Furnaces and the Dizziness: A Selection of Poems: 1970-1999, trans. Emanuel di Pasquale, Chelsea, New York, 2003.
- Milo De Angelis, Theme of Farewell and After-Poems: A Bilingual Edition, ed. and trans. by Susan Stewart and Patrizio Ceccagnoli, University of Chicago Press, Chicago, 2013.
