= Sessanta racconti =

1958 short story collection by Dino Buzzati

- First edition
- Author: Dino Buzzati
- Language: Italian
- Publisher: Arnoldo Mondadori Editore
- Publication date: 1958
- Publication place: Italy
- Pages: 566

Sessanta racconti ("sixty stories") is a 1958 short story collection by the Italian writer Dino Buzzati. The first 36 stories had been published previously, while the rest were new. Subjects covered include the horror and surreality of life in a modern city, the existential aspects of advanced technology, metaphysical ideas as well as fantasy realms. The book received the Strega Prize.

== Stories ==
1. "I sette messaggeri" "The seven messengers"
2. "L'assalto al grande convoglio"
3. "Sette piani"
4. "Ombra del sud"
5. "Eppure battono alla porta"
6. "Il mantello"
7. "L'uccisione del drago"
8. "Una cosa che comincia per elle"
9. "Vecchio facocero"
10. "Paura alla Scala"
11. "Il borghese stregato"
12. "Una goccia"
13. "La canzone di guerra"
14. "Il re a Horm el-Hagar"
15. "La fine del mondo"
16. "Qualche utile indicazione"
17. "Inviti superflui"
18. "Racconto di Natale"
19. "Il crollo della Baliverna"
20. "Il cane che ha visto Dio"
21. "Qualcosa era successo"
22. "I topi"
23. "Appuntamento con Einstein"
24. "Gli amici"
25. "I reziarii"
26. "All'idrogeno"
27. "L'uomo che volle guarire"
28. "24 marzo 1958"
29. "Le tentazioni di Sant'Antonio"
30. "Il bambino tiranno"
31. "Rigoletto"
32. "Il musicista invidioso"
33. "Notte d'inverno a Filadelfia"
34. "La frana"
35. "Non aspettavano altro"
36. "Il disco si posò"
37. "L'inaugurazione della strada"
38. "L'incantesimo della natura"
39. "Le mura di Anagoor"
40. "Direttissimo"
41. "La città personale"
42. "Sciopero dei telefoni"
43. "La corsa dietro il vento"
44. "Due pesi due misure"
45. "Le precauzioni inutili"
46. "Il tiranno malato"
47. "Il problema dei posteggi"
48. "Era proibito"
49. "L'invincibile"
50. "Una lettera d'amore"
51. "Battaglia notturna alla Biennale di Venezia"
52. "Occhio per occhio"
53. "Grandezza dell'uomo"
54. "La parola proibita"
55. "I Santi"
56. "Il critico d'arte"
57. "Una pallottola di carta"
58. "La peste motoria"
59. "La notizia"
60. "La corazzata "Tod" "

== Publication ==
Sessanta racconti was published by Arnoldo Mondadori Editore in 1958. It contains stories from the three previous collections The Seven Messengers (1942), Panic at La Scala (1949) and The Collapse of the Baliverna (1957), as well as previously unpublished stories.
