= Naming of Parts =

Poem by Henry Reed

"Lessons of the War: I: Naming of Parts", more commonly referred to simply as "Naming of Parts", is a poem by Henry Reed, in which a lecture on the parts of the Enfield rifle is juxtaposed with observations about nature in springtime. It was first published in the magazine New Statesman and Nation, in August 1942.

== Reception and analysis ==
Roger Rosenblatt calls it a "clever trick" of a poem, and emphasizes how the nomenclature of the rifle parts "mimics the flowering of spring". Susan Manning considered it to be "a studied, ironic catalogue of some parts of experience silencing others" which "excludes more than it includes", noting the presence of "the beauty of nature and its utter irrelevance to the human struggle".

Vernon Scannell observed that the poem is contrapuntal, in that it contains the voices of both the instructor and the trainee; he also outlined a "thread of sexual innuendo" which "becomes unequivocal in the third and fourth stanzas".

== Origin ==
While serving in the British Army during the Second World War, Reed "would entertain his friends by giving a comic imitation of a sergeant-instructor", and subsequently became fascinated by the cadence of "the utterances of the NCO"; these formed the basis for "Naming of Parts".
