= The Violin Player (film) =

1994 film

- Film poster
- Directed by: Charles Van Damme
- Written by: Jean-François Goyet; André Hodeir; Charles Van Damme
- Produced by: René Cleitman; Pierre Drouot
- Starring: Richard Berry
- Cinematography: Walther Vanden Ende
- Release date: 8 June 1994
- Running time: 94 minutes
- Countries: France; Belgium
- Language: French

The Violin Player (French: Le joueur de violon) is a 1994 French-Belgian drama film directed by Charles Van Damme. It was entered into the 1994 Cannes Film Festival.

== Cast ==
- Richard Berry as Armand
- François Berléand as Charles
- Bernard Ballet as Koehler
- Inês de Medeiros as Lydia
- John Dobrynine as Daraud
- Geno Lechner as Ariane
- Hanns Zischler as Michael
