= Il segreto del Bosco Vecchio =

1935 novel by Dino Buzzati

- Author: Dino Buzzati
- Publisher: Treves
- Publication date: 1935
- Pages: 214

Il segreto del Bosco Vecchio ("the secret of the Old Woods") is a 1935 novel by the Italian writer Dino Buzzati. It tells the story of a general who is about to cut down an old forest for the sake of financial gain, but discovers that the forest is inhabited by invisible spirits. Buzzati wrote the novel with inspiration from Arthur Rackham's illustrations for fairy tales and fables. He was also inspired by Gustave Doré and the environments of the Dolomites.

The novel was the basis for the 1993 film The Secret of the Old Woods, directed by Ermanno Olmi.
