= A Love Affair =

1963 novel by Dino Buzzati

- First edition (Italian)
- Author: Dino Buzzati
- Original title: Un amore
- Translator: Joseph Green
- Language: Italian
- Publisher: Mondadori
- Publication date: 1963
- Publication place: Italy
- English publication date: 1964
- Pages: 345

A Love Affair (Italian: Un amore) is a 1963 novel by the Italian writer Dino Buzzati. It tells the story of an architect in Milan who falls in love with a much younger ballerina. The novel has an unusually conventional narrative style compared to many of the author's other works.

An English translation by Joseph Green was published in 1964. The novel was the basis for the 1965 film Un amore, directed by Gianni Vernuccio.
