= Dreamplay =

1994 film

- Directed by: Unni Straume
- Screenplay by: Unni Straume
- Based on: A Dream Play by August Strindberg
- Produced by: Bente Erichsen; Peter Aalbæk Jensen; Lars Jönsson; Unni Straume
- Starring: Ingvild Holm
- Cinematography: Harald Gunnar Paalgard
- Edited by: Mikael Leschilowsky
- Release date: 5 August 1994
- Running time: 90 minutes
- Country: Norway
- Language: Norwegian

Dreamplay (Norwegian: Drømspel) is a 1994 Norwegian drama film directed by Unni Straume. It was screened in the Un Certain Regard section at the 1994 Cannes Film Festival.

== Cast ==
- Ingvild Holm as Agnes
- Bjørn Willberg Andersen as Lawyer
- Bjørn Sundquist as Poet
- Lars-Erik Berenett as Officer
- Liv Ullmann as Ticket Seller
- Bibi Andersson as Victoria
- Erland Josephson as Blind Man
- Joachim Calmeyer as Plakatklistreren
- Svein Scharffenberg as Bartenderen
- Mona Hofland as Moren
- Espen Skjønberg as Faren
- Merete Moen as Kristin
- Eindride Eidsvold as Brudgommen
- Camilla Strøm-Henriksen as Bruden
- Nils Ole Oftebro as Victorias elsker
- Arne Hestenes as Don Juan
