= The Translator's Invisibility =

Translation studies book by Lawrence Venuti

The Translator's Invisibility: A History of Translation
- First edition
- Author: Lawrence Venuti
- Language: English
- Subject: Translation studies
- Publisher: Routledge
- Publication date: 1995, revised 2008
- Publication place: United Kingdom
- Pages: 324
- ISBN: 978-0-415-39453-6

The Translator's Invisibility: A History of Translation is a translation studies book by Lawrence Venuti originally released in 1995. A second, substantially revised edition was published in 2008.

This book represents one of Venuti's most-studied works in which the author attempts to retrace the history of translation across the ages. In it, he lays out his theory that so-called "domesticating practices" at work in society have contributed to the invisibility of the translator in translations. He claims that legal and cultural constraints make it so that "'faithful rendition' is defined partly by the illusion of transparency", such that foreignizing or experimental types of translation are "likely to encounter opposition from publishers and large segments of Anglophone readers who read for immediate intelligibility". This leads to a climate in which "fluency" is the most important quality for a translation and all traces of foreignness or alterity tend to be purposely erased.

For Venuti, fluency in itself is not to be rejected; he believes that translations should be readable. The problem is rather that dominant notions of readability in translation emphasize an extremely narrow form of the translating language, usually the current standard dialect, regardless of the language, register, style or discourse of the source text. When fluency is achieved through the standard or most widely used form of the translating language, the illusion that the translation is not a translation but the source text is produced, and the inevitable assimilation of that text to values in the receiving culture is concealed. Venuti sees two main methods of questioning or forestalling these domesticating effects: one is to choose source texts that run counter to existing patterns of translating from particular languages and cultures, challenging canons in the receiving culture; the other is to vary the standard dialect, to experiment with nonstandard linguistic items (regional and social dialects, colloquialism and slang, obscenity, archaism, neologism), although not arbitrarily, taking into account the features of the source text. These methods do not give back the source text unmediated; they are foreignizing, constructing a sense of the foreign that is always already mediated by receiving cultural values.

In spite of their invisibility, the author asserts the historic power of translators: he maintains that translations have forced massive shifts in the Western literary canon and led to evolutions in literature and academic theory over time, as well as influencing the vision that societies have of foreign cultures. He therefore argues for a paradigm shift in the way translators consider their role, calling for them to curb the traditional domestication of translations and allow foreign influences to infiltrate translated texts. This position has led to him being compared to Antoine Berman.

The Translator's Invisibility has been a source of much debate – and sometimes criticism – among translation experts. Nevertheless, it has largely entered into the translation studies canon and is often required reading for translation students.
