= Singular =

Singular may refer to:

- Singular, the grammatical number that denotes a unit quantity, as opposed to the plural and other forms
- Singular or sounder, a group of boar, see List of animal names
- Singular (band), a Thai jazz pop duo
- Singular: Act I, a 2018 studio album by Sabrina Carpenter
- Singular: Act II, a 2019 studio album by Sabrina Carpenter

== Mathematics ==
- Singular homology
- SINGULAR, an open source Computer Algebra System (CAS)
- Singular matrix, a matrix that is not invertible
- Singular measure, a measure or probability distribution whose support has zero Lebesgue (or other) measure
- Singular cardinal, an infinite cardinal number that is not a regular cardinal
- Singular point of a curve, in geometry

== See also ==
- Singularity
- Singulair, Merck trademark for the drug Montelukast
- Cingular Wireless, a mobile network operator in North America
