= Charles Van Damme =

Belgian cinematographer

- Born: May 1946 (age 80); Brussels, Belgium
- Occupations: Cinematographer; Film director
- Years active: 1973–present

Charles Van Damme (born May 1946) is a Belgian cinematographer and film director. He has worked on 40 films since 1973. His film The Violin Player was entered into the 1994 Cannes Film Festival.

== Selected filmography ==
- One Sings, the Other Doesn't (1977)
- Descente aux enfers (1986)
- A Strange Place to Meet (1988)
- The Violin Player (1994 – directed)
- The Assassinated Sun (2002)
- Une Fenêtre ouverte (2005)
- The Demon Stirs (2005)
