= El héroe =

- Film poster
- Directed by: Carlos Carrera
- Written by: Carlos Carrera
- Produced by: Pablo Baksht
- Cinematography: Jorge Mercado; Hugo Mercado
- Edited by: Daniel Medero Reyna
- Music by: Gabriel Romo
- Animation by: Carlos Carrera
- Production company: Instituto Mexicano de Cinematografía
- Release date: May 1994 (Cannes)
- Running time: 5 minutes
- Country: Mexico
- Language: Spanish

El héroe (English: The Hero) is a 1994 Mexican animated short film written and directed by Carlos Carrera. It won the Short Film Palme d'Or at the 1994 Cannes Film Festival. It was the first Mexican film to win the Short Film Palme d'Or and it is considered a milestone in Mexican animation.

== Plot ==
In a crowded subway station in Mexico City, a man watches a girl acting strange. He realizes she might be attempting to commit suicide by jumping to the tracks. The man tries to stop her, but she accuses him of being a molester and insults him. After the man is taken away by a police officer, she jumps in front of the oncoming train.

== Production ==
El héroe was Carlos Carrera's third professional project after his directorial debut La mujer de Benjamín and La vida conyugal. The film was produced by the Directorate of Short Film Production of the Instituto Mexicano de Cinematografía (Mexican Film Institute).

The film consists of 2800 hand-drawn images, the images were drawn on cel using pastels. Most of the animation was done by Carrera himself.

== Reception ==
The film was awarded the Short Film Palme d'Or at the 1994 Cannes Film Festival. It also won several other awards including the Ariel Award for Best Short Fiction Film, the Golden Coral for Animation at the 1994 Havana Film Festival and special recognitions at the 1995 Sundance Film Festival and the 1996 World Festival of Animated Film Zagreb.

== Awards and nominations ==
Year	Award	Category	Recipient(s) and nominee(s)	Result	Ref(s)
1994	Ariel Award	Best Live Action Short Film	Carlos Carrera	Won	
1994	Cannes Film Festival	Short Film Palme d'Or	Carlos Carrera	Won	
1994	Havana Film Festival	Grand Coral – Animation	Carlos Carrera	Won	
1994	San Juan Cinemafest	Pitirre Award – Best Animation	Carlos Carrera	Won	
1995	Sundance Film Festival	Special Jury Recognition – Short Filmmaking	Carlos Carrera	Won	
1996	Animafest Zagreb	Special Mention	Carlos Carrera	Won	

== Legacy ==
El héroe was the first Mexican short film to win the Palme d'Or and it was the second time a Mexican director was awarded the Palme d'Or since 1946 when Emilio Fernández won the Grand Prix with María Candelaria.

Though it was not the first Mexican animated film, Carrera's short film and its award at Cannes are credited for bringing attention to animated films to the Mexican film industry and to a new generation of Mexican filmmakers.

Since, El héroe, Carrera has made a few animated short films. In 2017, he premiered Ana y Bruno, an animated feature film with an estimated budget of US$5.35 million, making it the most expensive animated Mexican film.
