= Un amore (1965 film) =

- Directed by: Gianni Vernuccio
- Screenplay by: Ennio De Concini
- Based on: A Love Affair by Dino Buzzati
- Starring: Rossano Brazzi; Agnès Spaak
- Cinematography: Aldo Scavarda
- Music by: Giorgio Gaslini
- Release date: December 15, 1965
- Country: Italy
- Language: Italian

Un amore is a 1965 Italian romance film directed by Gianni Vernuccio. It is based on the novel A Love Affair by Dino Buzzati.

== Plot ==
In Milan, Antonio Dorigo, a 49-year-old architect, struggles to form close relationships with women but finds solace in visiting Mrs. Ermelina's establishment. One day, he schedules an appointment with a new girl, Adelaide, an underage dancer from La Scala, also known as Laide. Antonio falls in love with her, but Laide desires a strictly physical relationship. Despite attempts to free himself from the obsession, Laide becomes his kept woman while maintaining her independent life. Over time, Laide grows impatient with Antonio, feeling he is old and intrusive. Blinded by love, Antonio ignores Laide's flaws until he must confront the reality of their relationship. He eventually marries someone else but realizes too late that Laide was his true love. Desperate to reconnect, Antonio arranges a meeting, only to find that Laide wants nothing to do with him.

== Cast ==
- Rossano Brazzi as Antonio Dorigo
- Agnès Spaak as Laide
- Gérard Blain as Marcello
- Marisa Merlini as Ermelina
- Lucilla Morlacchi as Luisa
- Alice Field
- Cesare Barilli
- Lia Reiner
- Stella Monclar
- Lina Pozzi
- Wilma Casagrande
- Febo Villani
- Anna María Aveta
