= Translation Changes Everything =

Book by Lawrence Venuti

- Author: Lawrence Venuti
- Language: English
- Subject: Translation studies
- Publisher: Routledge
- Publication date: 2013
- Publication place: United States of America
- Pages: 278
- ISBN: 978-0-415-69629-6
- LC Class: P306.2.V454 2013

Translation changes everything: Theory and practice is a collection of essays written by translation theorist Lawrence Venuti. during the period 2000–2012.

Venuti conceives translation as an interpretive act with far-reaching social effects, at once enabled and constrained by specific cultural situations. The selection sketches the trajectory of his thinking about translation while engaging with the main trends in research and commentary. The issues covered include basic concepts like equivalence, retranslation, and reader reception; sociological topics like the impact of translations in the academy and the global cultural economy; and philosophical problems such as the translator's unconscious and translation ethics.

== Essays within book ==
Essay	First published in	Year of publication
1. Translation, Community, Utopia	The Translation Studies Reader	2000
2. The Difference that Translation Makes: The Translator's Unconscious	Translation Studies: Perspectives on an Emerging Discipline	2002
3. Translating Derrida on Translation: Relevance and Disciplinary Resistance	The Yale Journal of Criticism	2003
4. Translating Jacopone da Todi: Archaic Poetries and Modern Audiences	Translation and Literature	2003
5. Retranslations: The Creation of Value	Bucknell Review	2004
6. How to Read a Translation	Words without Borders	2004
7. Local Contingencies: Translation and National Identities	Nation, Language & the Ethics of Translation	2005
8. Translation, Simulacra, Resistance	Translation Studies	2008
9. Translation on the Book Market		
10. Teaching in Translation	Teaching World Literature	2009
11. The Poet's Version; or, An Ethics of Translation	Translation Studies	2011
12. Translation Studies and World Literature	Routledge Companion to World Literature	2012
13. Translation Trebled: Ernest Farré's Edward Hopper in English		
14. Towards a Translation Culture	The Iowa Review	2011

== Scholarly reviews ==
Wei Liu in Perspectives Studies in Translatology published 1 December 2013.

John-Mark Philo in Oxford Comparative Criticism & Translation (OCCT) published 6 August 2014.

Anthony Pym in The European Legacy published 3 October 2015.
