= Khady Sylla =

Senegalese writer

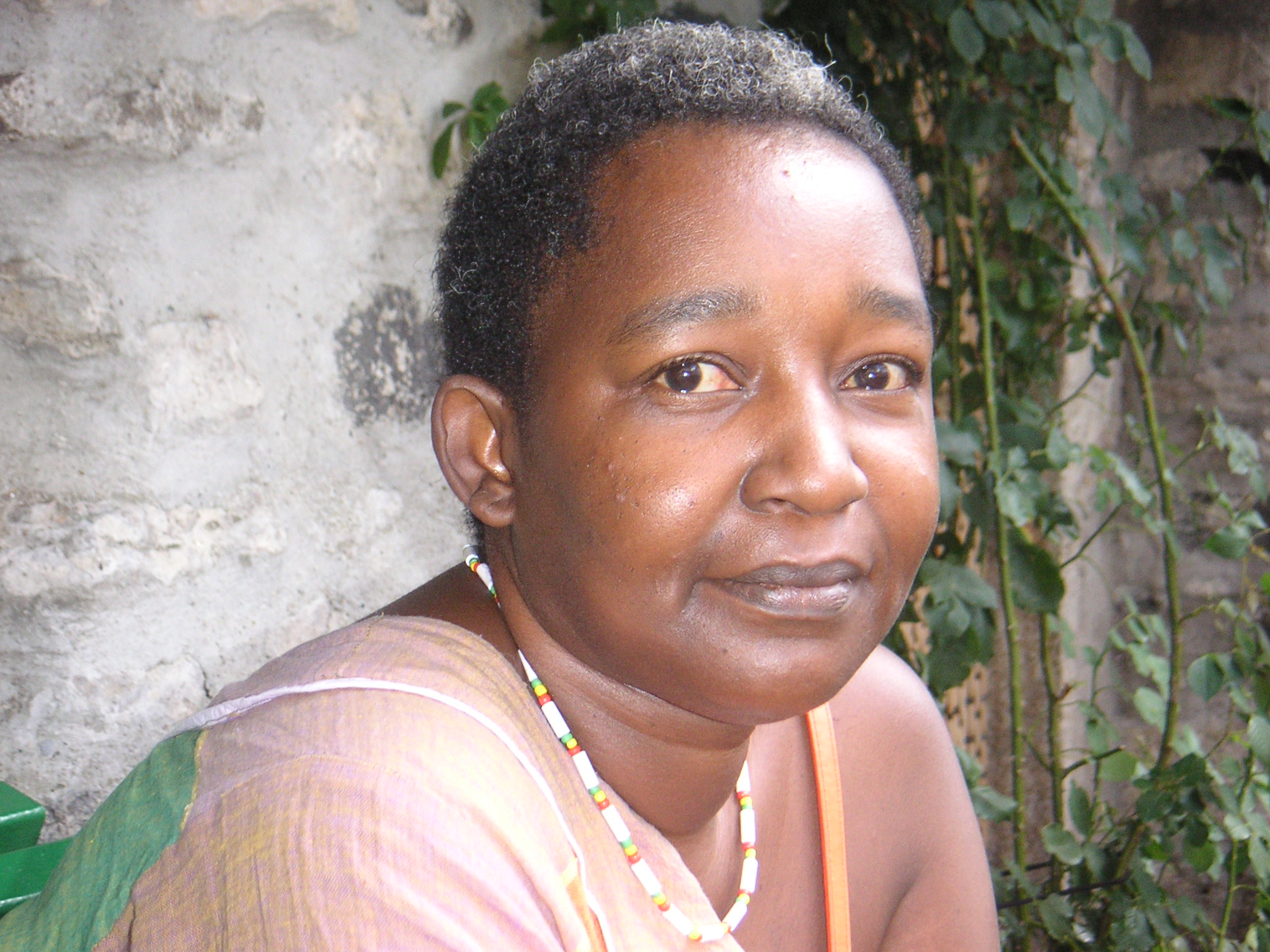
- Born: March 27 1963; Dakar
- Died: October 28 2013; Dakar
- Education: École Normale Supérieure
- Occupation: Writer . filmmaker
- Notable work: Une fenêtre ouverte
- Relatives: Mariama Sylla

Khady Sylla (Dakar, March 27, 1963 – Dakar, October 8, 2013) was a Senegalese writer of two novels, short work, and filmmaker.

== Life ==
Born in Dakar, she studied at the École Normale Supérieure where she became interested in a literary career. She later became one of a small number of African women film makers. Her An Open Window won a first film prize at the Marseille Festival of Documentary Film . She was one of several Senegalese filmmakers mentored by French ethnologist Jean Rouch. She was the older sister of the filmmaker Mariama Sylla, with whom she co-directed the film Une simple parole.

== Works ==
Novels

- Le Jeu de la Mer [The Game of the Sea]. Paris: L'Harmattan, 1992. ISBN 2-7384-1563-6

Films

- Les Bijoux-(1997), Short film
- Colobane Express (1999), docu-drama about the passengers of a Senegalese bus.
- Une fenêtre ouverte (2005), documentary short (52 min.)
- Une simple parole (2014)
