= The Seven Messengers =

Collection of short stories by Dino Buzzati

- First edition
- Author: Dino Buzzati
- Original title: I sette messaggeri
- Language: Italian
- Publisher: Arnoldo Mondadori Editore
- Publication date: 1942
- Publication place: Italy
- Pages: 262

The Seven Messengers (Italian: I sette messaggeri) is a collection of short stories written by Dino Buzzati and published as a book in 1942. It contains nineteen short tales, in which the characters often interact with the presence of the fantastic and/or death, many of which are left unconcluded, leaving the reader in suspense or trying to guess their ending. "The Seven Messengers" is also the name of the book's first short story.

The story "Sette piani" was the basis for the 1967 film The Seventh Floor.

== Stories ==
1. I sette messaggeri
2. L'assalto al Grande Convoglio
3. Sette piani
4. Ombra del sud
5. Eppure battono alla porta
6. Eleganza militare
7. Temporale sul fiume
8. L'uomo che si dava arie
9. Il memoriale
10. Cèvere
11. Il mantello
12. L'uccisione del drago
13. Una cosa che comincia per elle
14. Il dolore notturno
15. Notizie false
16. Quando l'ombra scende
17. Vecchio facocero
18. Il sacrilegio
19. Di notte in notte
