= Larger than Life (novel) =

1960 novel by Dino Buzzati

- First edition
- Author: Dino Buzzati
- Translator: Henry Reed
- Language: Italian
- Publisher: Arnoldo Mondadori Editore
- Publication date: 1960
- Publication place: Italy
- English publication date: 1962
- Pages: 177

Larger than Life, also translated as The Singularity (Italian: Il grande ritratto), is a 1960 novel by the Italian writer Dino Buzzati. It tells the story of a scientist who becomes entangled with a large electronic machine in which the woman he loves is reincarnated. The book is considered to be the first serious novel of Italian science fiction, with content that goes beyond light entertainment. An English translation by Henry Reed was published in 1962, and a translation by Anne Milano Appel was published in 2024 titled The Singularity.

== Reception ==
"Sergeant Cuff" of The Saturday Review called the book "a read-at-a-sitting parable with science-fiction overtones" and described it as "skillfully put together".
