= Carlos Carrera =

Mexican film director and screenwriter

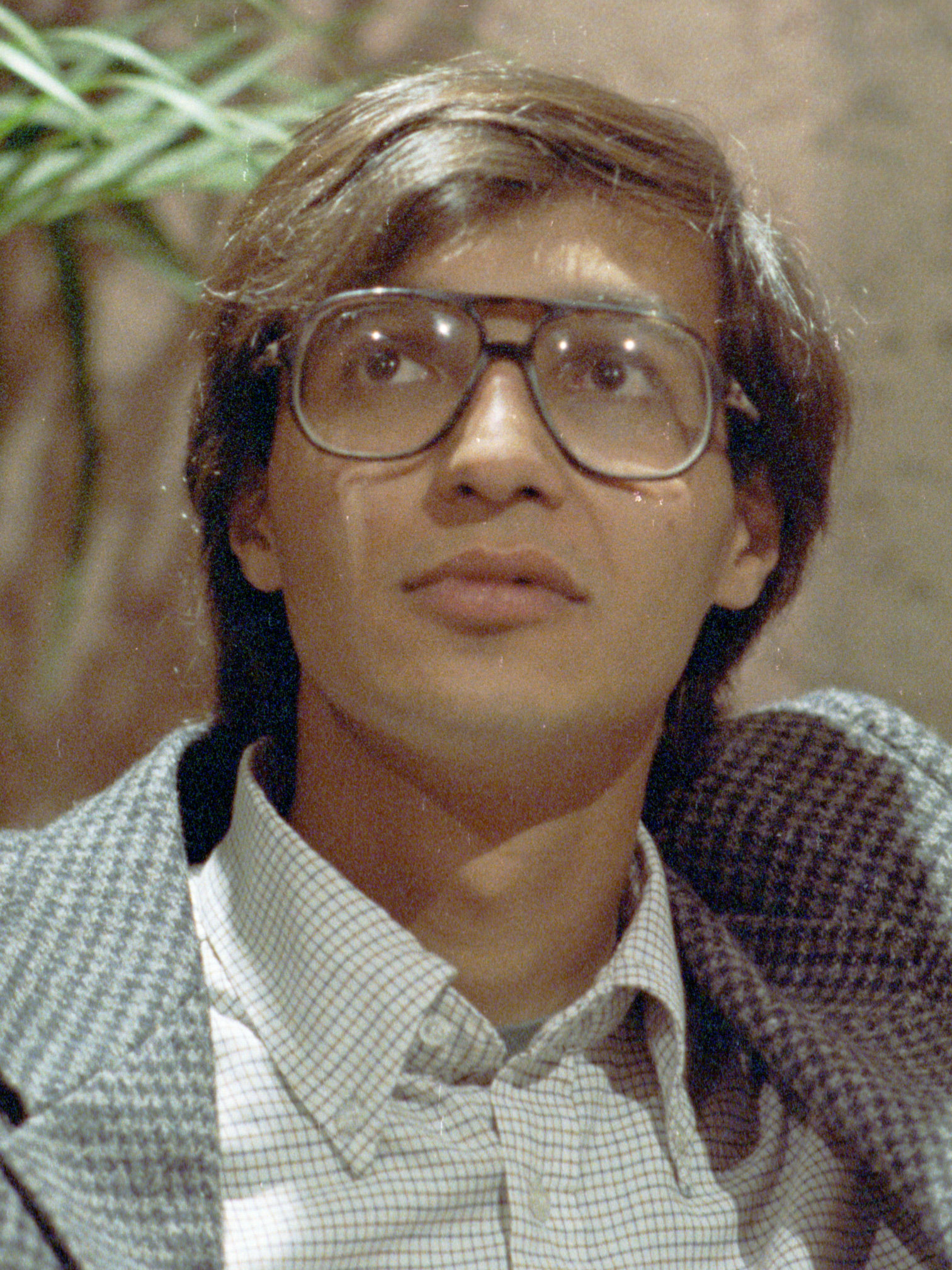
- Born: Luis Carlos Carrera González; 18 August 1962 (age 64); Mexico City, Mexico
- Education: Ibero-American University; Centro de Capacitación Cinematográfica
- Occupations: Director, screenwriter, producer, animator
- Years active: 1991–present
- Honours: Short Film Palme d'Or; Ariel Award

Carlos Carrera (born 18 August 1962) is a Mexican film director and screenwriter.

His debut feature from 1991, La mujer de Benjamín, earned him the Ariel Award for Best First Feature. In 1994 at the Cannes film festival he won the Palme d’Or in the Short film category for El héroe.

In 2002, under advise from Alfredo Ripstein, Carrera directed El crimen del Padre Amaro, about the romantic relationship between a catholic priest and a woman. The film was an adaptation of the novel by José María Eça de Queiroz with a screenplay by playwright Vicente Leñero, starring Gael García Bernal and Ana Claudia Talancón. When it was released, the film caused a controversy on the part of Roman Catholic groups in Mexico who tried to stop the film from being screened. The film was a success at the box office, both in Mexico and internationally. It was nominated for the Academy Award for Best Foreign Language Film at the 75th Academy Awards. It was also nominated to 13 Ariel awards, winning 9 of them.

In 2009, he directed Backyard about the female homicides in Ciudad Juárez, which won a silver plaque at the 2009 Chicago International Film Festival. The film was nominated for 9 Ariel awards, winning 5 of them.

== Filmography ==
=== Film ===
Year	Title	Credited as			Notes
Year	Title	Director	Writer	Producer	Notes
1991	Benjamin's Woman (La mujer de Benjamín)	Yes	Yes	No	Directorial debut Co-written with Ignacio Ortiz
1993	La vida conyugal	Yes	Yes	No	Co-written with Ignacio Ortiz
1995	Sin remitente	Yes	Yes	No	Co-written with Ignacio Ortiz and Silvia Pasternac
1998	Un embrujo	Yes	Yes	No	Co-written with Martín Salinas
2002	The Crime of Padre Araro	Yes	No	No	
2009	Backyard	Yes	No	No	
2010	De la infancia	Yes	Yes	Yes	Co-written with Silvia Pasternac
2017	Ana y Bruno	Yes	No	No	Also animator
2026	Azul Oscuro, Azul Celeste	Yes	No	No	Documentary film

=== Short films ===
Year	Title	Credited as		Notes
Year	Title	Director	Writer	Notes
1994	El héroe	Yes	Yes	Also animator Won 1994 Short Film Palme d'Or.
2004	De raíz	Yes	Yes	Also animator
2006	Barbacoa de Chivo	Yes	No	Segment of Sexo, amor y otras perversiones
