= Dino Buzzati =

Italian writer (1906–1972)

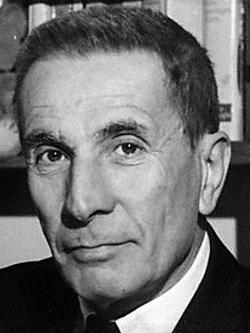
- Buzzati, 1950s
- Born: 16 October 1906; San Pellegrino di Belluno, Italy
- Died: 28 January 1972 (age 65); Milan, Italy
- Education: University of Milan
- Occupations: Graphic artist, novelist, short story writer, journalist
- Writing career
- Genres: Novel, short story
- Notable work: The Tartar Steppe
- Movement: Magical realism

Signature
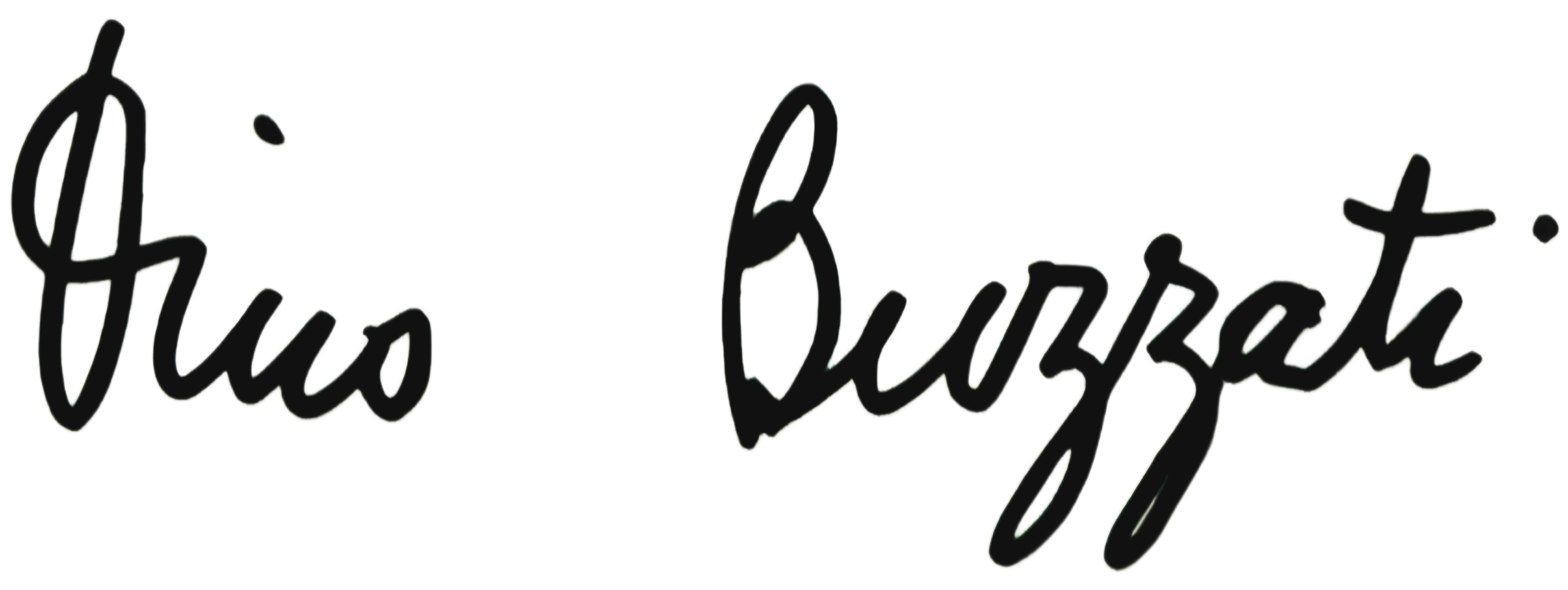

Dino Buzzati-Traverso (Italian: [ˈdiːno butˈtsaːti]; 16 October 1906 – 28 January 1972) was an Italian novelist, short story writer, painter and poet, as well as a journalist for Corriere della Sera. His worldwide fame is mostly due to his novel The Tartar Steppe, although he is also known for his well-received collections of short stories.

== Life ==
=== Early life and education ===
Buzzati was born in San Pellegrino, Belluno, in his family's ancestral villa. Buzzati's mother, a veterinarian by profession, was Venetian and his father, a professor of international law at the newly founded Bocconi University, was from an old Bellunese family. Buzzati was the second of his parents' four children. One of his brothers was the well-known Italian geneticist Adriano Buzzati-Traverso.

After the premature death of his father, Buzzati enrolled at the Giuseppe Parini High School in Milan. During this time, he developed a keen interest in Egyptian culture and the work of Arthur Rackham. In 1924, he enrolled in the law faculty of the University of Milan, where he graduated on 10 October 1928.

=== Journalism ===
Shortly after finishing his studies, Buzzati was hired by the Milanese newspaper Corriere della Sera, where he worked until his death. He began in the editorial department. Later he worked as a reporter, special correspondent, essayist, editor, and art critic. It is often said that his journalistic background informs his writing, lending even the most fantastic tales an aura of realism. Buzzati himself commented on the connection (as cited by Lawrence Venuti):

It seems to me, fantasy should be as close as possible to journalism. The right word is not "banalizing", although in fact a little of this is involved. Rather, I mean that the effectiveness of a fantastic story will depend on its being told in the most simple and practical terms.

Between 1935 and 1936, he edited the monthly supplement La Lettura. It was during this period that he started writing short stories, some of which were published in the Corriere della Sera. When Italy entered the Second World War in 1940, Buzzati was sent as a war correspondent to Addis Ababa. Serving as a journalist attached to the Regia Marina, he wrote extensive war reports which were collected in 1992 in the volume Il Buttafuoco. Cronache di guerra sul mare. From January to the summer of 1942, Buzzati remained in Messina undercover, working as a war correspondent and military operator at the Marisicilia naval base.

After the end of the war, The Tartar Steppe was published nationwide in Italy and quickly brought critical recognition and fame to the author. Buzzati continued to write for Corriere della Sera, becoming the deputy editor of the weekly newspaper La Domenica del Corriere from 1950 to 1963. Under his leadership, the weekly saw an exceptional increase in sales, often approaching a million copies.

=== The early 1960s ===
In the 1960s Buzzati was sent a correspondent for the Corriere in Japan, Jerusalem, New York, Washington, India and Prague. Some of the articles written during these trips were later included in Cronache Terrestri, a collection of around a hundred journalistic pieces published shortly after the author's death. In 1966 he married Almerina Antoniazzi.

Buzzati’s work as a journalist for has been widely recognized posthumously for its literary quality, frequently blurring the lines between news reporting and surreal storytelling. Following his death in 1972, several anthologies of his articles were published, establishing his reputation not only as a novelist but as a major 20th-century Italian reporter.

=== Literary career ===
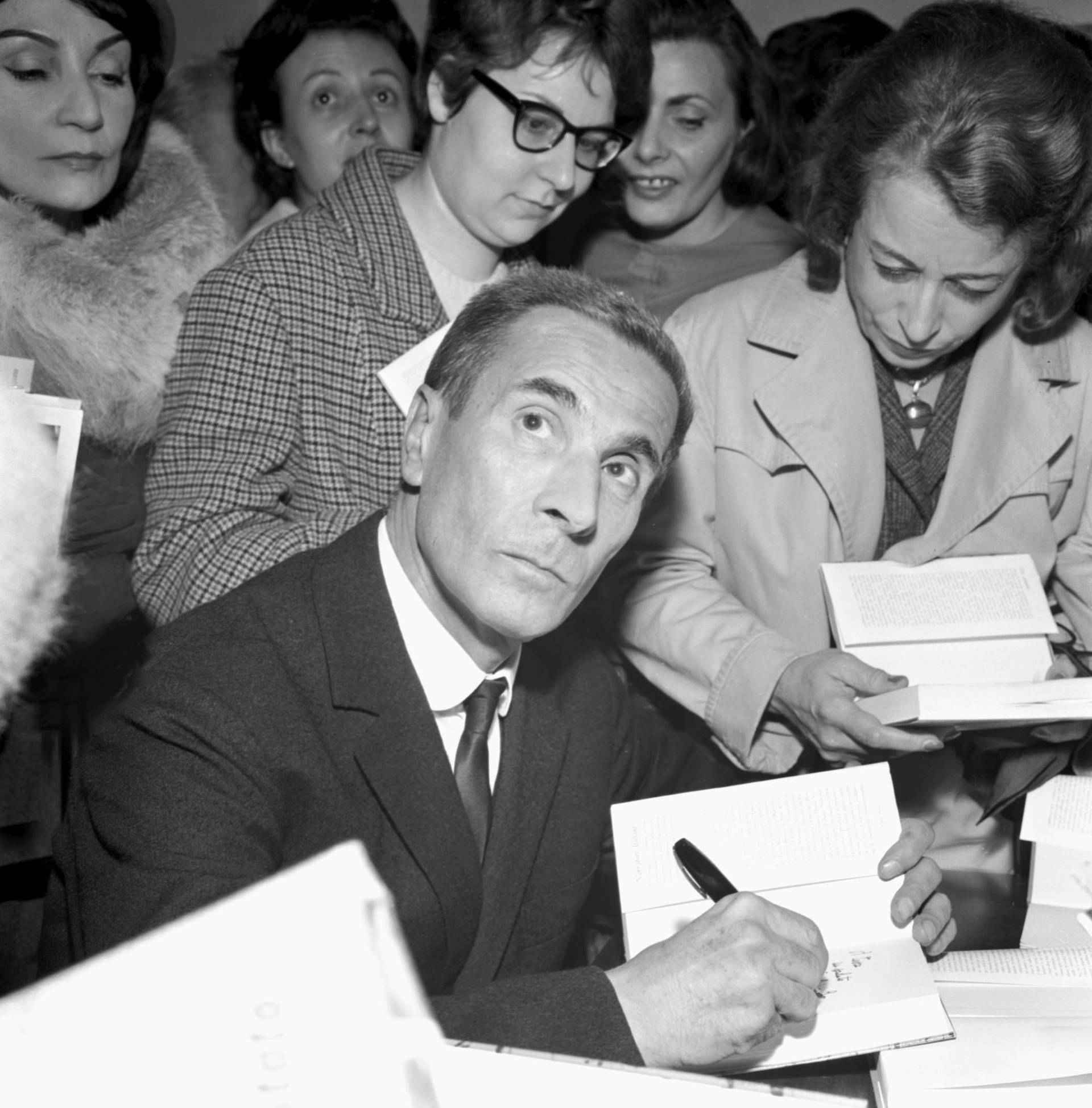
Buzzati signing a book, 1960s

Buzzati's debut novel, Barnabo of the Mountains, was published in 1933, followed two years later by Il segreto del Bosco Vecchio. Both works were later adapted into films: the former by Mario Brenta in 1994 and the latter by Ermanno Olmi in 1993. In the late 1930s, Buzzati began publishing fantastic and surreal stories in Corriere della Sera and other newspapers, such as "Seven Floors". On 9 June 1940, he published his greatest success: The Tartar Steppe. Written the previous year, the original title was The Fortress, but this was changed at the suggestion of Leo Longanesi. The novel was adapted into a film by Valerio Zurlini in 1976. In 1949, the novel was published in France and met with great success.

In 1942, Buzzati published The Seven Messengers, a collection of the finest short stories published in various magazines and newspapers throughout his career. In the following years, Buzzati mainly published collections of fantasy stories: Paura alla Scala in 1949 and Il declino della Baliverna in 1954. From these first three collections, Buzzati selected the most representative stories, which he published alongside other texts in the 1958 volume Sessanta racconti, winner of the Strega Prize. In 1958, he also published Esperimento di Magia. 18 Racconti. Other publications that appeared during this period include the children's novel The Bears' Famous Invasion of Sicily, which was illustrated by the author, and the collections In quel preciso momento and Egregio signore, siamo dispiaciuti di....

Between the 1940s and 1950s, Buzzati started writing for theatre. His major success in this field came in 1953 with Un caso clinico, a comedy based on his 1937 short story Sette piani, which was adapted for the Parisian stage a few years later by Albert Camus. Camus found in this story an echo of the themes of the absurd he had explored in The Myth of Sisyphus and The Stranger.

In 1960, Buzzati returned to the novel format with Larger than Life, a work that addressed the theme of femininity – a departure from the author's previous output. This novel anticipated his more famous work, A Love Affair (1963), which centres on a tormented love story in which some of the writer's autobiographical experiences can be discerned. A realistic, erotic novel, A Love Affair stunned critics and readers alike for its crude objectivity that departed sharply from Buzzati's magical realism. The novel was later adapted into the 1965 film Un Amore by Gianni Vernuccio.

In 1965, Buzzati published his only collections of poetry: Il capitano Pic e altre poesie, Scusi, da che parte per Piazza del Duomo?, and Tre colpi alla porta. The following year, he published a new collection of short stories, Il colombo e altri quattro racconti, followed two years later by La boutique del mistero, which brings together thirty-one stories taken from all the previous collections.

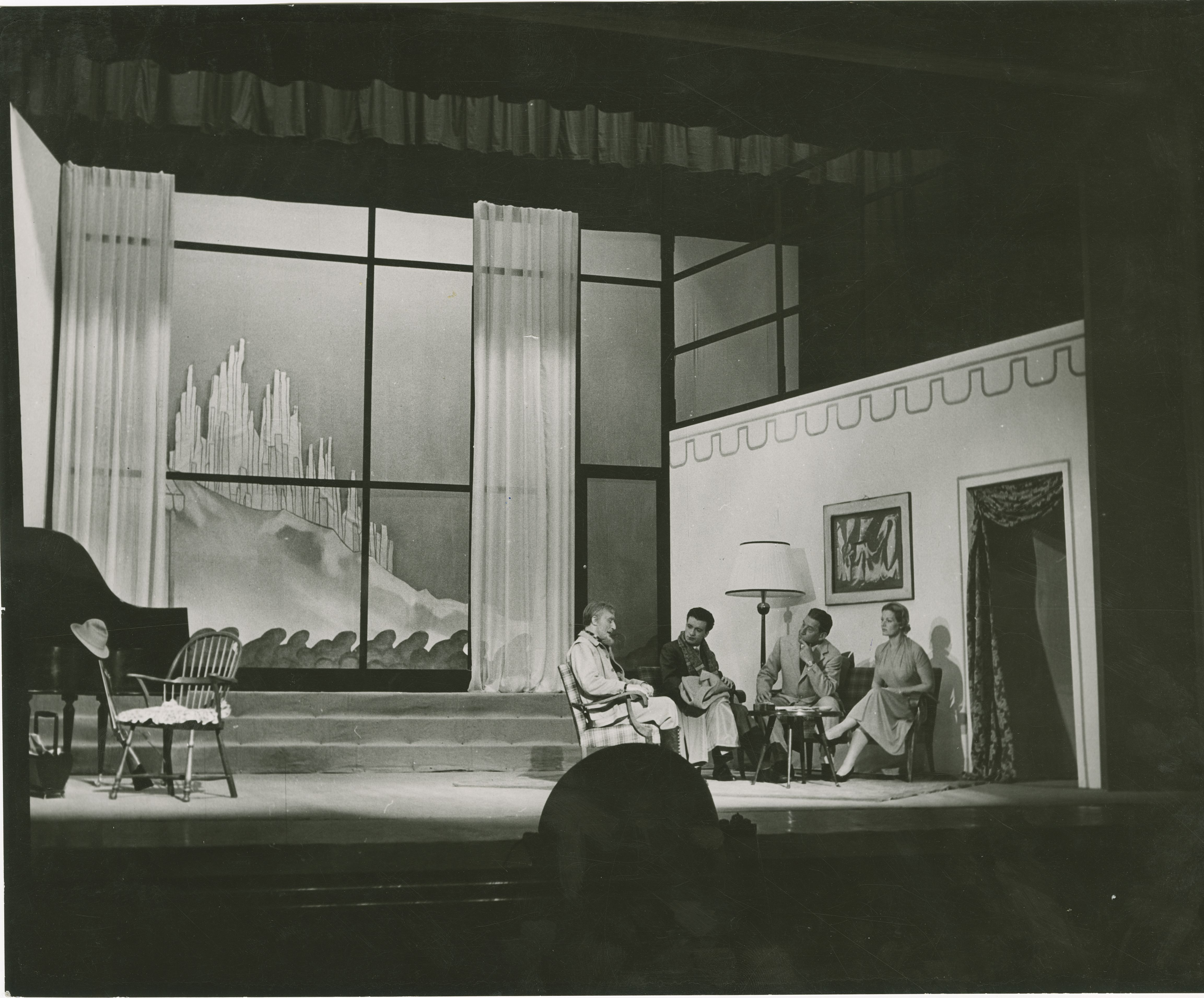
The comedy Drammatica fine di un noto musicista by Buzzati, 1955

Buzzati's last works are the controversial and celebrated Poem Strip (1969), a work halfway between a novel and a comic book, which reworks the myth of Orpheus and Eurydice in a pop style; Le notti difficili (1971), a collection of short stories and editorials focused on death; and I miracoli di Val Morel (1971), a collection of paintings and short comments centered on fake miracles, which, according to the author, were attributed to Saint Rita by popular tradition. In 1972, Buzzati died of cancer after a protracted illness.. His ashes were scattered on Croda da Lago in the Dolomites in the summer of 2010.

== Works summary ==
Buzzati began writing fiction in 1933. His works of fiction include five novels, theatre and radio plays, librettos, numerous books of short stories, and poetry. His libretti include four for operas by Luciano Chailly, as well as one for La giacca dannata by Giulio Viozzi.

He wrote a children's book, La famosa invasione degli orsi in Sicilia (translated by Frances Lobb into English as The Bears' Famous Invasion of Sicily). Lemony Snicket wrote an introduction and reader's companion to a 2005 English edition.

Also an artist, Buzzati combined his artistic and writing exploits into making a comic book based on the myth of Orpheus, Poem Strip. Commenting on the graphic element, he once explained that "for me, painting and writing are the same thing." As both a painter and a writer, Buzzati was profoundly influenced by Giorgio de Chirico's metaphysical painting. This influence is evident in the surreal atmosphere of suspended expectation and subtle anguish that defines his work.

The Tartar Steppe, his most famous novel, tells the story of a military outpost that awaits a Tartar invasion. In its sentiment and its conclusions, it has been compared to existentialist works, notably Albert Camus's The Myth of Sisyphus.

His writing is sometimes cited as magical realism or social alienation. The fate of the environment and fantasy in the face of unbridled technological progress are recurring themes. He wrote a variety of short stories featuring fantastic animals such as the bogeyman and, his own invention, the colomber (il colombre). His Sessanta racconti collection of sixty stories, which won the Strega Prize in 1958, features elements of science fiction, fantasy, and horror.

== In modern culture ==
J. M. Coetzee's novel Waiting for the Barbarians (1980) was heavily influenced by Buzzati's The Tartar Steppe. In 2019, the Australian singer, songwriter, and guitarist from Last Dinosaurs Lachlan Caskey, known as Notes From Under Ground, referenced Buzzati on his solo album Partner by making his name one of the song titles.

== Works ==
- Bàrnabo delle montagne (1933). Barnabo of the Mountains, trans. Lawrence Venuti, included in The Siren (1984)
- Il segreto del Bosco Vecchio (1935). The Secret of the Old Woods
- Il deserto dei Tartari (1940). The Tartar Steppe, trans. Stuart C. Hood (Secker & Warburg, 1952); also as The Stronghold, trans. Lawrence Venuti (New York Review Books, 2023)
- I sette messaggeri (1942, short stories). The Seven Messengers
- La famosa invasione degli orsi in Sicilia (1945). The Bears' Famous Invasion of Sicily, trans. Frances Lobb (Pantheon, 1947)
- In quel preciso momento (1950)
- Il crollo della Baliverna (1954)
- Sessanta racconti (1958, short stories). Sixty Stories
- Il grande ritratto (1960). Larger than Life, trans. Henry Reed (Secker & Warburg, 1962); also as The Singularity, trans. Anne Milano Appel (New York Review Books, 2024)
- Un amore (1963). A Love Affair, trans. Joseph Green (Farrar Straus, 1964)
- Il capitano Pic e altre poesie (1965, poetry)
- Cacciatori di vecchio (1966, novel)
- Il colombre (1966, short stories)
- Poema a fumetti (1969, comic book). Poem Strip, trans. Marina Harss (New York Review Books, 2009)
- Dino Buzzati al Giro d'Italia (1981, nonfiction), The Giro d'Italia; Coppi versus Bartali at the 1949 Tour of Italy, trans. Julia Amari, Velo Press, ISBN 978-1-884737-51-0
- Il reggimento parte all'alba (1985, short stories). The Regiment Leaves at Dawn

Compilations in English

- Catastrophe and Other Stories, trans. Judith Landry and Cynthia Jolly (Calder, 1965)
- Restless Nights: Selected Stories of Dino Buzzati, trans. Lawrence Venuti (North Point Press, 1983)
- The Siren: A Selection from Dino Buzzati, trans. Lawrence Venuti (Farrar, Straus & Giroux, 1984)
- The Bewitched Bourgeois: Fifty Stories, trans. Lawrence Venuti (New York Review Books, 2025)
- La boutique del mistero, Arnoldo Mondadori Editore, Milano 1968, ISBN 978-88-04-48770-8

== Awards and honours ==
- 1951: Gargano Prize, for In quel preciso momento
- 1954: Naples Prize, for Il crollo della Baliverna
- 1958: Strega Prize, for Sessanta racconti
- 1969: Paese Sera Prize, for Poema a fumetti
- 1970: All’Amalia Prize
- 1970: Mario Massai Prize

== Bibliography ==
- Gianfranceschi, Fausto (1967). Dino Buzzati. Turin: Borla.
- Schneider, Marilyn (1969). "Beyond the Eroticism of Dino Buzzati's Un amore". Italica. 46 (3): 292–299. doi:10.2307/477807.
- Chomel, Luisetta (1979). "Structure of Anguish in Buzzati and De Chirico". The Comparatist. 3: 16–22. JSTOR 44366651.
- Venuti, Lawrence (1982). "Dino Buzzati's Fantastic Journalism". Modern Fiction Studies. 28 (1): 79–91. JSTOR 26281280.
- Montiel, Luis (2010). "Una meditatio mortis contemporánea. La reflexión de Dino Buzzati sobre la caducidad de la vida humana" (PDF). Medicina & Historia. 2: 1–15.
- Lethem, Jonathan (14 July 2025). "A Master of Surrealist Fiction and a Bard for Anxious Times". The New York Times Book Review.
