= Mario Brenta =

Italian film director

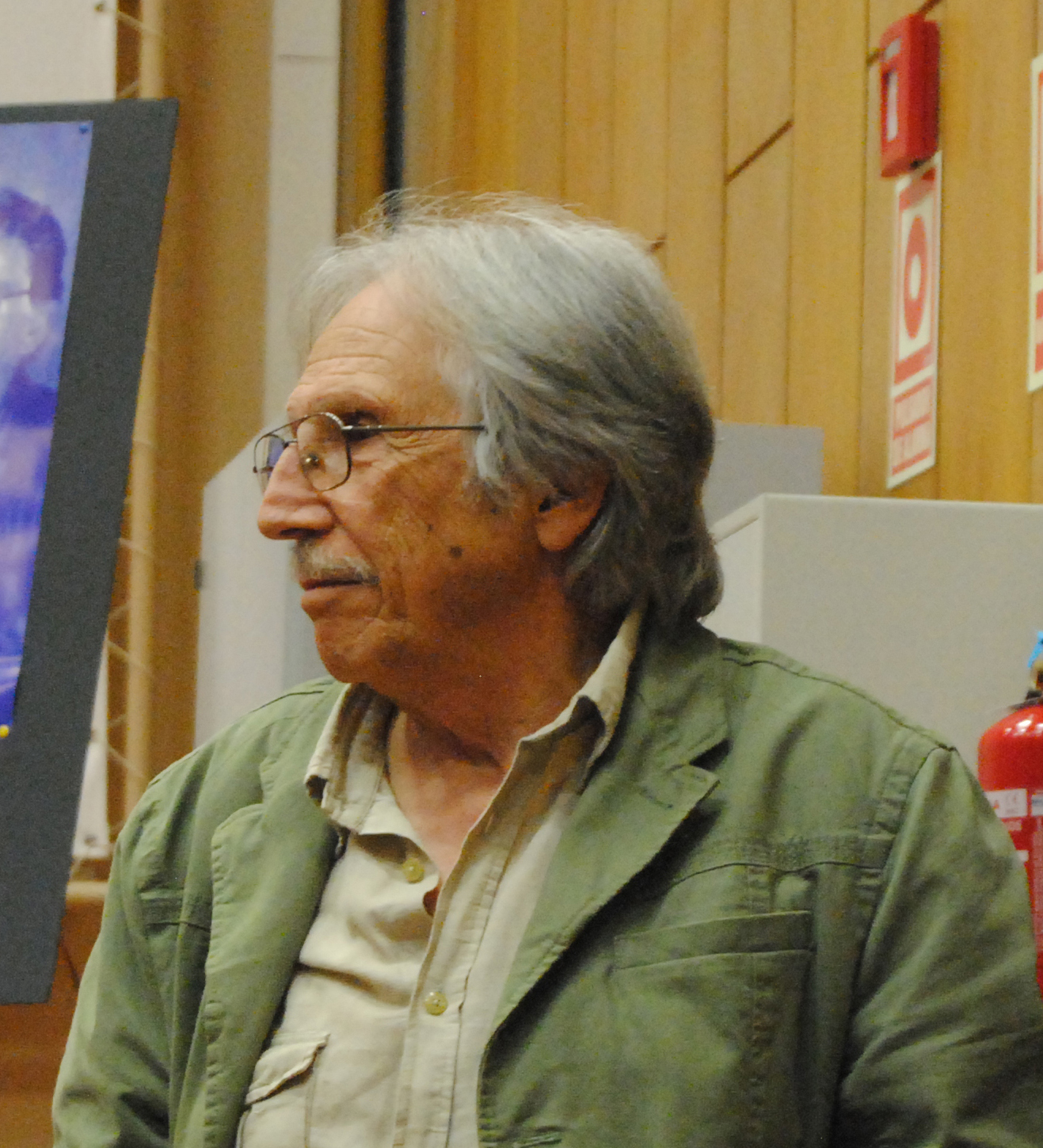
- Born: 17 April 1942 (age 84); Venice, Italy
- Occupations: Film director Screenwriter
- Years active: 1975-2004

Mario Brenta (born 17 April 1942) is an Italian film director and screenwriter. His film Barnabo of the Mountains was entered into the 1994 Cannes Film Festival.

== Filmography ==
- Vermisat (1975)
- Istantanea per un delitto (1975)
- Maicol (1989)
- Barnabo delle montagne (1994)
- Segui le ombre (2004)
- Calle De La Pietà (2014)
- Corpo a corpo (2014)
