= Lawrence Venuti =

American translator (born 1953)

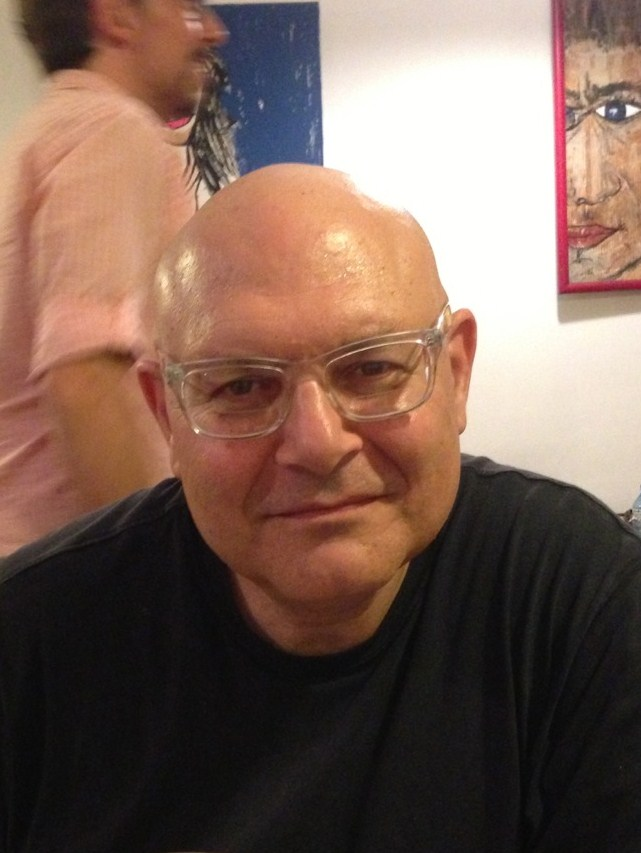
- Venuti in 2014
- Born: February 9, 1953 (age 73)
- Occupations: Translation theorist, translation historian, translator

Academic background
- Education: Temple University; Columbia University (PhD)

Academic work
- Discipline: Translation studies
- Institutions: Temple University, University of Pennsylvania, Princeton University, Columbia University, University of Trento, University of Mainz, Barnard College, and Queen's University Belfast
- Notable works: The Translator's Invisibility: A History of Translation (1995)

Lawrence Venuti (born February 9, 1953) is an American translation theorist, translation historian, and a translator from Italian, French, and Catalan.

== Career ==
Born in Philadelphia, Venuti graduated from Temple University. In 1980 he completed a Ph.D. in English at Columbia University, where he studied with historically oriented literary scholars such as Joseph Mazzeo and Edward Tayler as well as theoretically engaged cultural and social critics such as Edward Said and Sylvere Lotringer. That year he received the Renato Poggioli Award for Italian Translation for his translation of Barbara Alberti's novel Delirium.

Venuti is Professor Emeritus of English at Temple University, where he taught for forty years (1980-2020). He has taught as a visiting professor at the University of Pennsylvania, Princeton University, Università degli Studi di Trento, Johannes Gutenberg-Universität Mainz, Barnard College, and Queen's University Belfast. He has also lectured and led seminars in summer programs sponsored by the Centre for Translation Studies at KU Leuven, the Institute for World Literature, the Nida School for Translation Studies, the Société d’Etudes des Théories et Pratiques en Traduction, and the University of Ljubljana.

During 1987-1995 he was the general editor of Border Lines: Works in Translation, a series with Temple University Press. He oversaw the acquisition and publication of three translations: The World of Kate Roberts: Selected Stories, 1925-1981 (1991), ed. and trans. Joseph P. Clancy; PPPPPP: Poems Performance Pieces Proses Plays Poetics, Selected Writings of Kurt Schwitters (1993), ed. and trans. Jerome Rothenberg and Pierre Joris; and Abd al-Hakim Qasim's Rites of Assent: Two Novellas (1995), trans. Peter Theroux.

He has served as a member of the editorial or advisory boards of The Translator: Studies in Intercultural Communication, TTR : traduction, terminologie, rédaction, Translation Review, Translation Studies, and Palimpsestes. He has edited special journal issues devoted to translation and minority (The Translator in 1998) and poetry and translation (Translation Studies in 2011).

His translation projects have won awards and grants from the PEN American Center (1980), the Italian government (1983), the National Endowment for the Arts (1983, 1999), and the National Endowment for the Humanities (1989). In 1999 he held a Fulbright Senior Lectureship in translation studies at the University of Vic (Catalonia). In 2007 he was awarded a Guggenheim Fellowship for his translation of Giovanni Pascoli's poetry and prose. In 2008 his translation of Ernest Farrés's Edward Hopper: Poems won the Robert Fagles Translation Prize. In 2018 his translation of J.V. Foix's Daybook 1918: Early Fragments won the Global Humanities Translation Prize.

== Thought and influence ==
Venuti has concentrated on the theory and practice of translation. He is considered one of the most critically minded figures in modern translation theory, often with positions that substantially differ from those of mainstream theorists. He criticizes the fact that, too frequently, the translator is an invisible figure. He has been engaged in translation criticism ever since he started translating.

His seminal work, The Translator's Invisibility: A History of Translation, has been a source of debate since its publication. In it, he lays out his theory that so-called "domesticating practices" at work in translating cultures have contributed to the reduction or suppression of the linguistic and cultural differences of source texts as well as the marginality of translation. He claims that a range of constraints—discursive, cultural, ideological, legal—entails that "'faithful rendition' is defined partly by the illusion of transparency," whereby a translation comes to be read as the source text and the translator's interpretive labor is effaced, a labor that always involves assimilating the source text to receiving cultural values. As a result, "foreignizing" or experimental types of translation are "likely to encounter opposition from publishers and large segments of Anglophone readers who read for immediate intelligibility", although he is careful to observe that the same development occurs worldwide, regardless of the degree of prestige that a language and culture may hold in the shifting global hierarchy. This situates translation under a "discursive regime" in which "fluency" is narrowly defined as adherence to the current standard dialect of the translating language, preempting discursive forms that might register difference along with the translator's presence. As a solution to this problem, Venuti puts forward the strategy of foreignization, which aims at "sending the reader abroad" in the sense of challenging dominant values in the receiving culture, instead of "bringing the author back home", as is the case when a translation contributes to the reinforcement of those values.

Comparative literature scholar Susan Bassnett points out Venuti's emphasis on a translator-centered translation and his insistence that translators should inscribe themselves visibly into the text. This emphasis requires that a translation be read not only as a text that establishes a semantic correspondence and a stylistic approximation to the source text, but also as a text in its own right that transforms its source and therefore is relatively autonomous from it.

== Works ==
- Our Halcyon Dayes: English Prerevolutionary Texts and Postmodern Culture (1989)
- Rethinking Translation: Discourse, Subjectivity, Ideology (1992) (anthology of essays, editor)
- The Translator's Invisibility: A History of Translation (1995; 2nd ed. 2008; rpt. with a new introduction in 2018)
- The Scandals of Translation: Towards an Ethics of Difference (1998) (read a review here).
- The Translation Studies Reader (2000; 2nd ed. 2004; 3rd ed. 2012; 4th ed. 2021) (a survey of translation theory and commentary from antiquity to the present; editor)
- Translation Changes Everything: Theory and Practice (2013)
- Teaching Translation: Programs, Courses, Pedagogies (2017) (anthology of essays, editor)
- Contra Instrumentalism: A Translation Polemic (2019)
- Theses on Translation: An Organon for the Current Moment (2019)

== Translations ==
- Barbara Alberti's novel, Delirium (1980)
- Aldo Rossi's A Scientific Autobiography (1981)
- Restless Nights: Selected Stories of Dino Buzzati (1983)
- Francesco Alberoni's Falling in Love (1983)
- The Siren: A Selection from Dino Buzzati (1984)
- Iginio Ugo Tarchetti's Fantastic Tales (1992, rpt. in 2013; abbreviated ed. in 2020)
- Iginio Ugo Tarchetti's novel, Passion (1994, rpt. as Fosca in 2009)
- Finite Intuition: Selected Poetry and Prose of Milo De Angelis (1995)
- J. Rodolfo Wilcock’s collection of real and imaginary biographies, The Temple of Iconoclasts (2000, rpt. in 2014)
- Antonia Pozzi’s Breath: Poems and Letters (2002)
- Italy: A Traveler’s Literary Companion (2003)
- Melissa P.’s fictionalized memoir, 100 Strokes of the Brush before Bed (2004)
- Massimo Carlotto's novel, The Goodbye Kiss (2006)
- Massimo Carlotto's novel, Death's Dark Abyss (2006)
- Ernest Farrés’s Edward Hopper: Poems (2009)
- Paola Loreto's poems, houses | stripped (2018)
- J.V. Foix's Daybook 1918: Early Fragments (2019)
- Dino Buzzati's The Stronghold (New York Review Books, 2023)
- Dino Buzzati's The Bewitched Bourgeois: Fifty Stories (New York Review Books, 2025)
