= The Killing Kind =

The Killing Kind may refer to:

- The Killing Kind (album), by Overkill
- The Killing Kind (1973 film), by Curtis Harrington
- The Killing Kind (TV series), a 2023 British legal thriller
  - the novel by Jane Casey upon which the series was based
- Mr In-Between, a 2001 British crime drama film released in the U.S. as The Killing Kind
