= Jean-Baptiste Bertrand =

French painter and lithographer (1823–1887)

James Bertrand
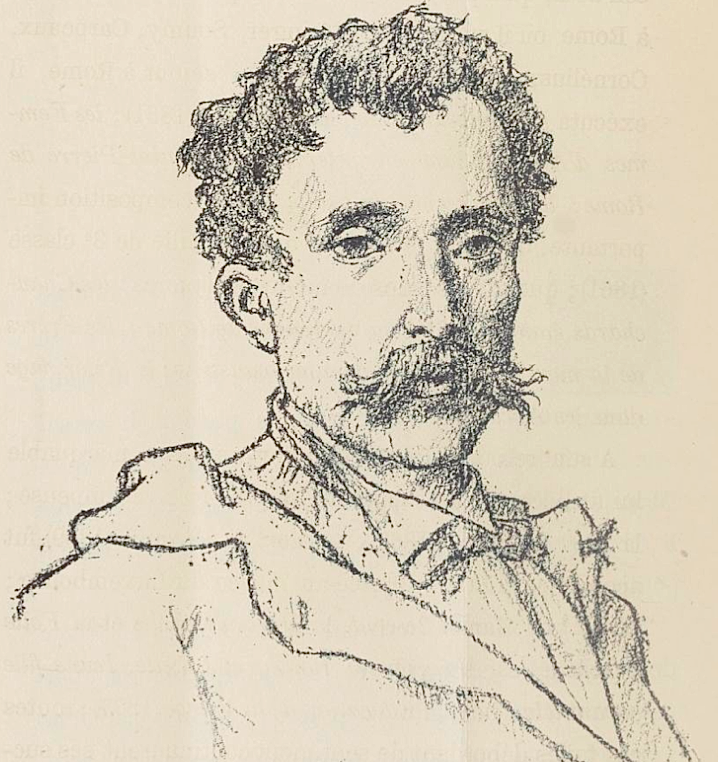
- Self portrait, 1883
- Born: 25 March 1823
- Died: 27 September 1887 (aged 64)
- Resting place: Montparnesse Cemetery
- Education: École nationale supérieure des beaux-arts de Lyon
- Awards: Knight of the Legion of Honour (1876)

Jean-Baptiste "James" Bertrand (25 March 1823 Lyon - 26 September 1887 Orsay, Seine-et-Oise) was a French painter and lithographer. Bertrand was also known as James Bertrand. At first he was a student of Étienne Rey (1789–1867) and later of Jean-Claude Bonnefond (1796–1860) at the École des Beaux-Arts in Lyon from 1840 to 1843.

Alphonse Périn (1798–1874) suggested that he move to Paris, where he enrolled at the École des Beaux-Arts in 1844 and had his first Salon exhibition in 1857. He spent 11 years working with Périn and his teacher and friend Victor Orsel, decorating the chapel of the Eucharist in the Paris Church of Notre Dame de Lorette and in 1854 started work on reproductions of work by Orsel.

Bertrand travelled in Italy between 1857 and 1862. Returning to Paris, he befriended sculptors such as Jean-Baptiste Carpeaux, Alexandre Falguière and Auguste Clésinger. Influenced by his sculptor contacts, Bertrand devoted himself from 1866 to allegories and genre scenes, departing from his early Nazarene style. These were heroic depictions of the great heroines of history and literature, as in the Death of Sappho (1867), the Death of Virginie (1869), the Death of Manon Lescaut (1870) and the Death of Ophelia (1872). These works became widely known and popular through engravings.

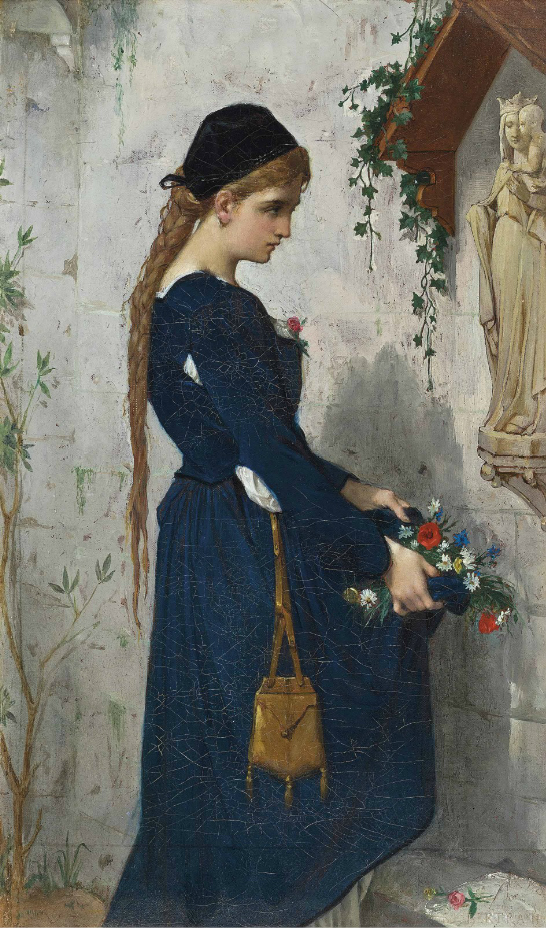
At the Shrine

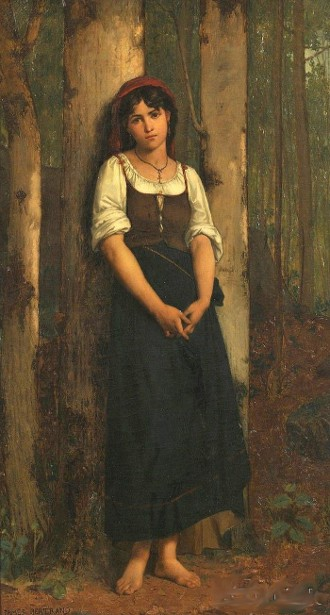
Meditation

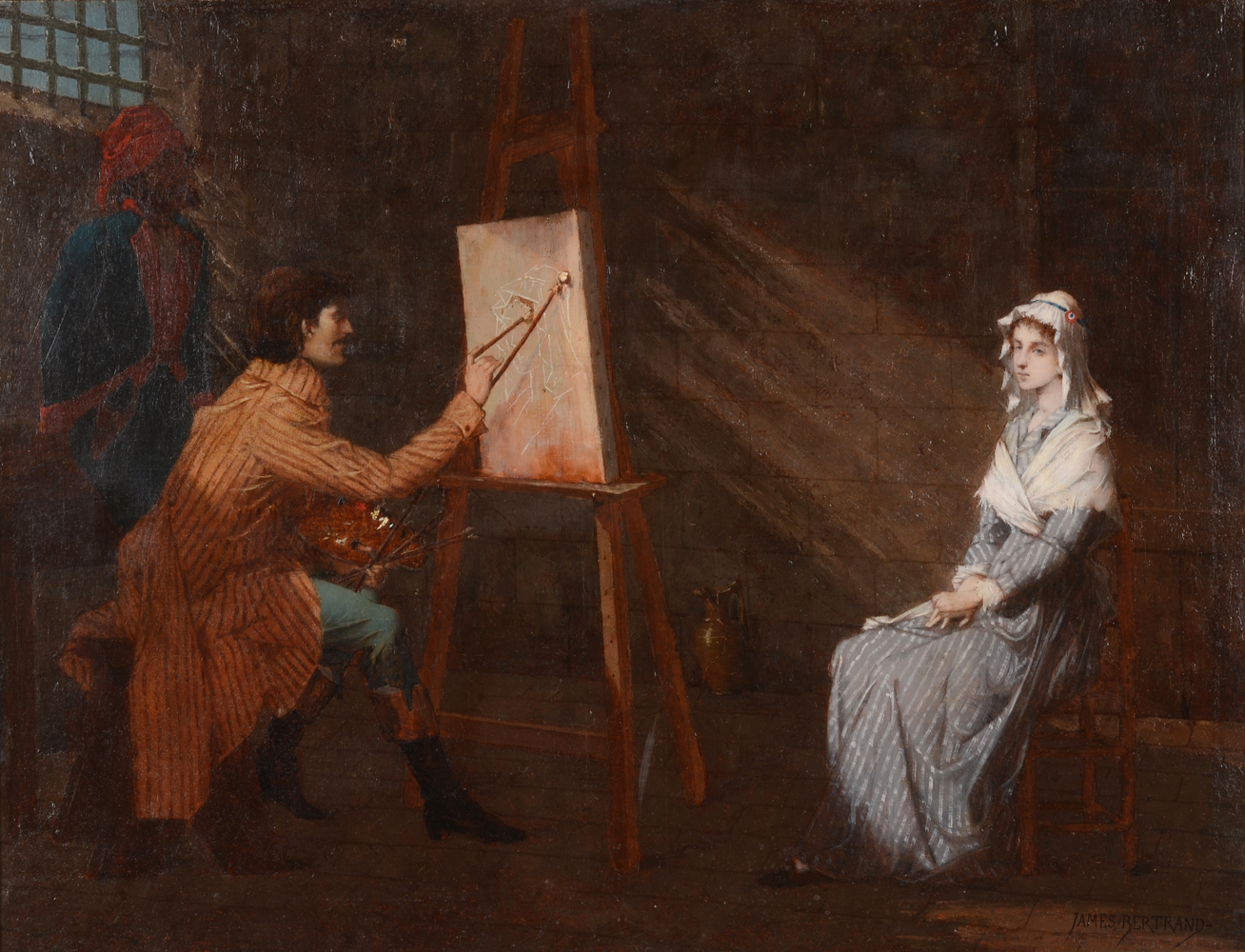
Jean-Jacques Hauer portrays Charlotte Corday (circa 1860)

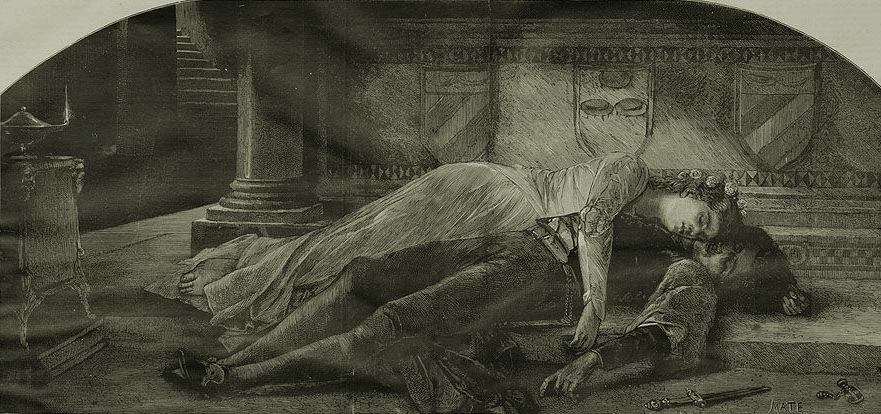
Roméo et Juliette

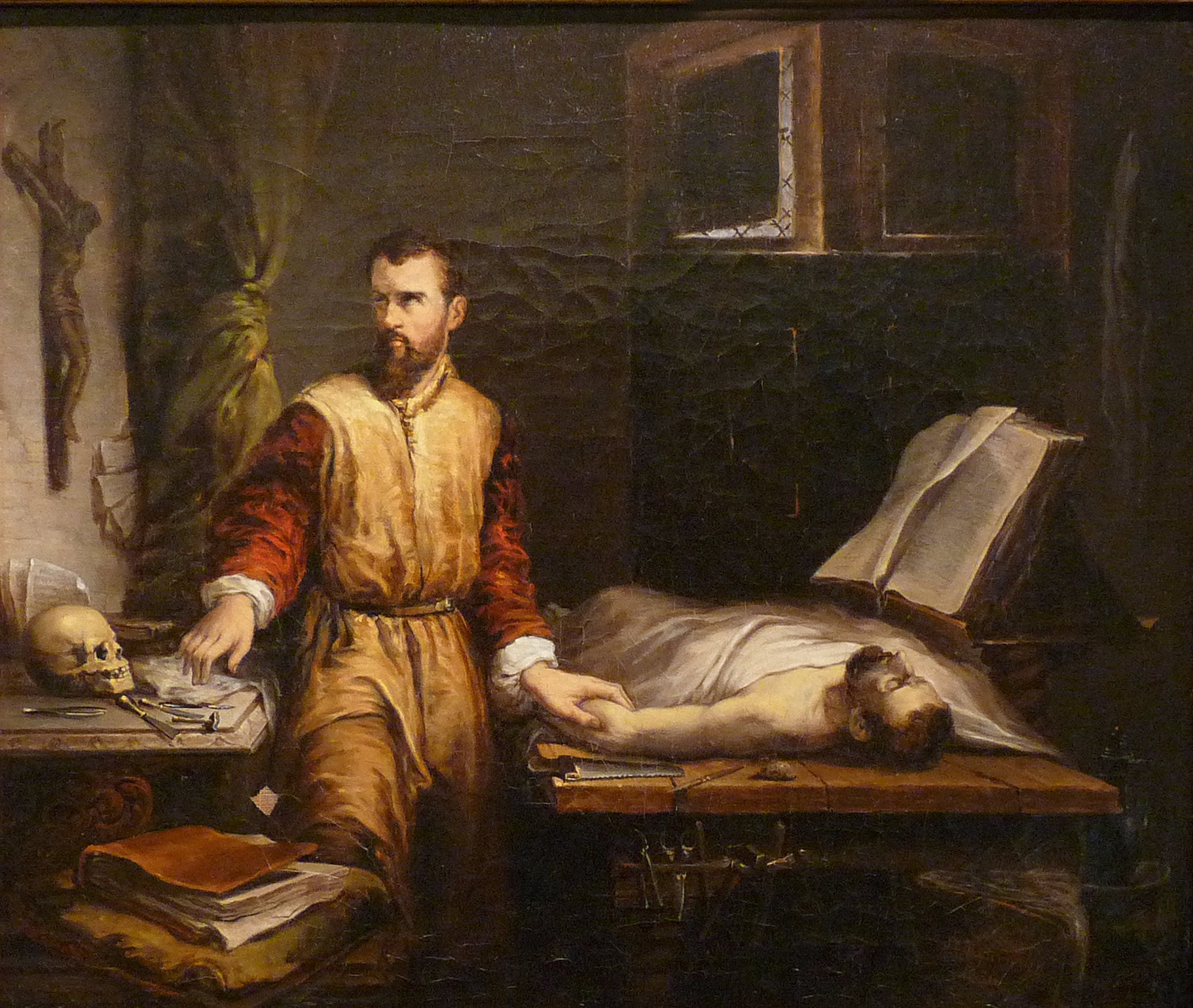
Ambroise Paré

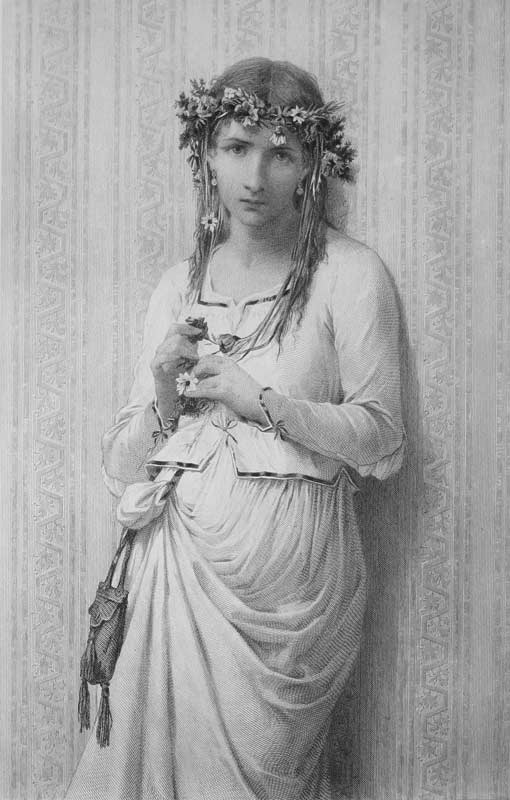
Ophelia
