= Charlotte Corday =

French assassin (1768–1793)

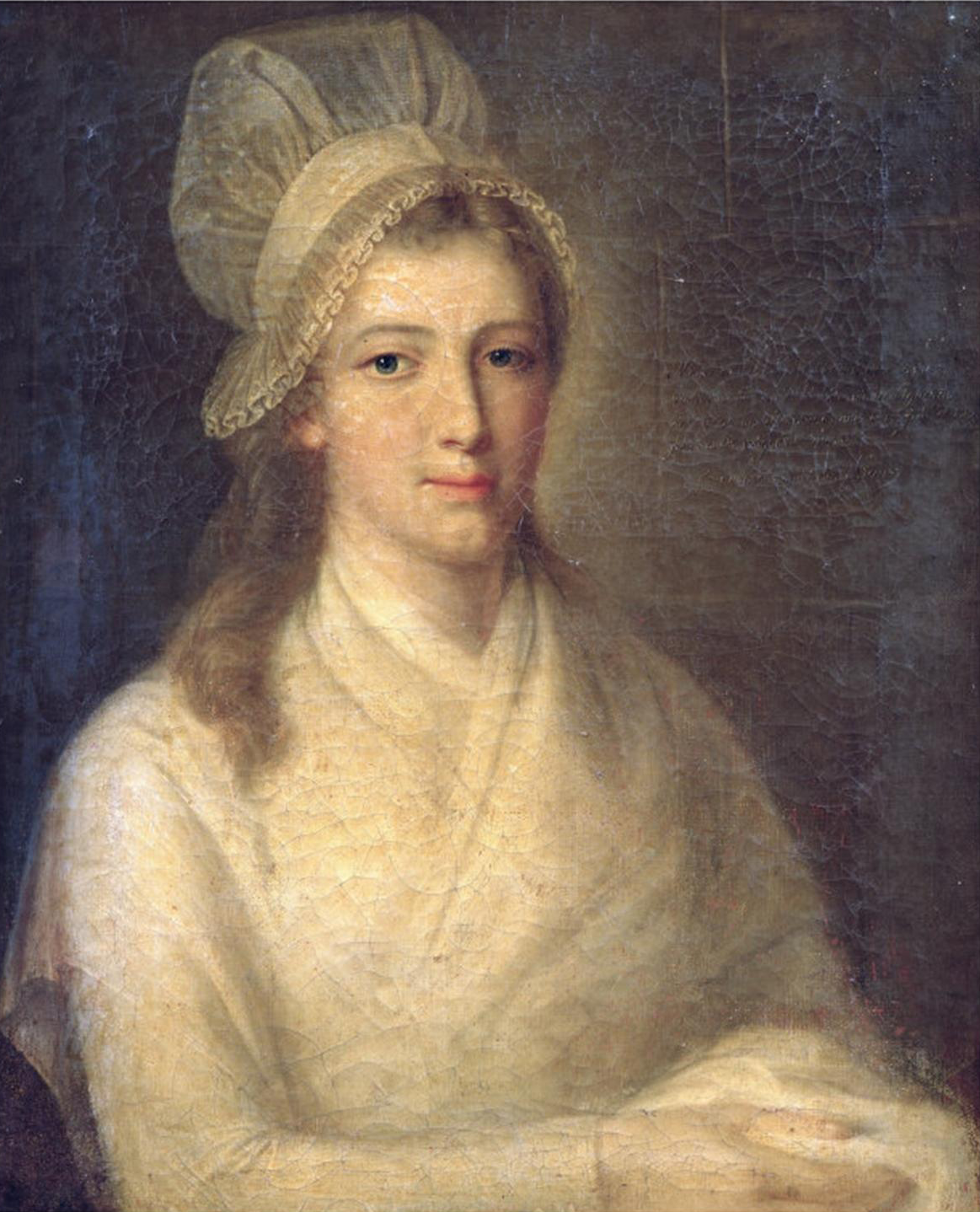
- Charlotte Corday, painted at her request by Jean-Jacques Hauer, a few hours before her execution
- Born: Marie-Anne Charlotte de Corday d'Armont; 27 July 1768; Saint-Saturnin-des-Ligneries, Normandy, France
- Died: 17 July 1793 (aged 24); Paris, France
- Cause of death: Execution by guillotine
- Known for: Assassination of Jean-Paul Marat

Signature
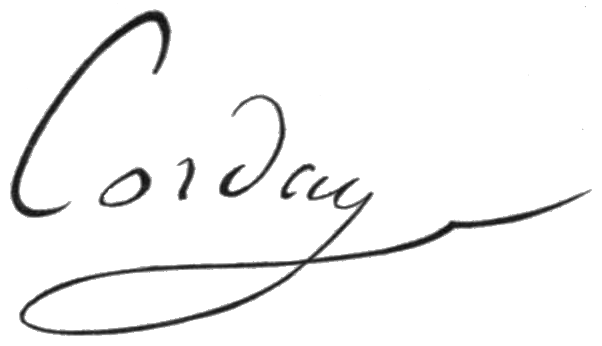

Marie-Anne Charlotte de Corday d'Armont (27 July 1768 – 17 July 1793), known as Charlotte Corday (French: [kɔʁdɛ]), was a figure of the French Revolution who assassinated revolutionary and Jacobin leader Jean-Paul Marat on 13 July 1793. Corday was an aristocratic sympathiser of the Girondins, a moderate faction of French revolutionaries in opposition to the more extremist Jacobins. She held Marat responsible for the September Massacres of 1792 and, believing that the Revolution was in jeopardy from the more radical course the Jacobins had taken, she decided to assassinate Marat.

On 13 July 1793, having travelled to Paris and obtained an audience with Marat, Corday fatally stabbed him with a knife while he was taking a medicinal bath. Marat's assassination was memorialised in the painting The Death of Marat by Jacques-Louis David. Corday was immediately arrested, found guilty by the Revolutionary Tribunal and on 17 July, four days after Marat's death, executed by the guillotine on the Place de Grève.

The direct consequences of the assassination were the opposite of what she expected: the assassination did not stop the Jacobins or the Reign of Terror, which intensified after the murder. Marat became a martyr, a bust of him replaced a religious statue on the rue aux Ours, and several place-names were changed to honour Marat. In 1847, writer Alphonse de Lamartine gave Corday the posthumous nickname l'ange de l'assassinat (the Angel of Assassination).

== Biography ==
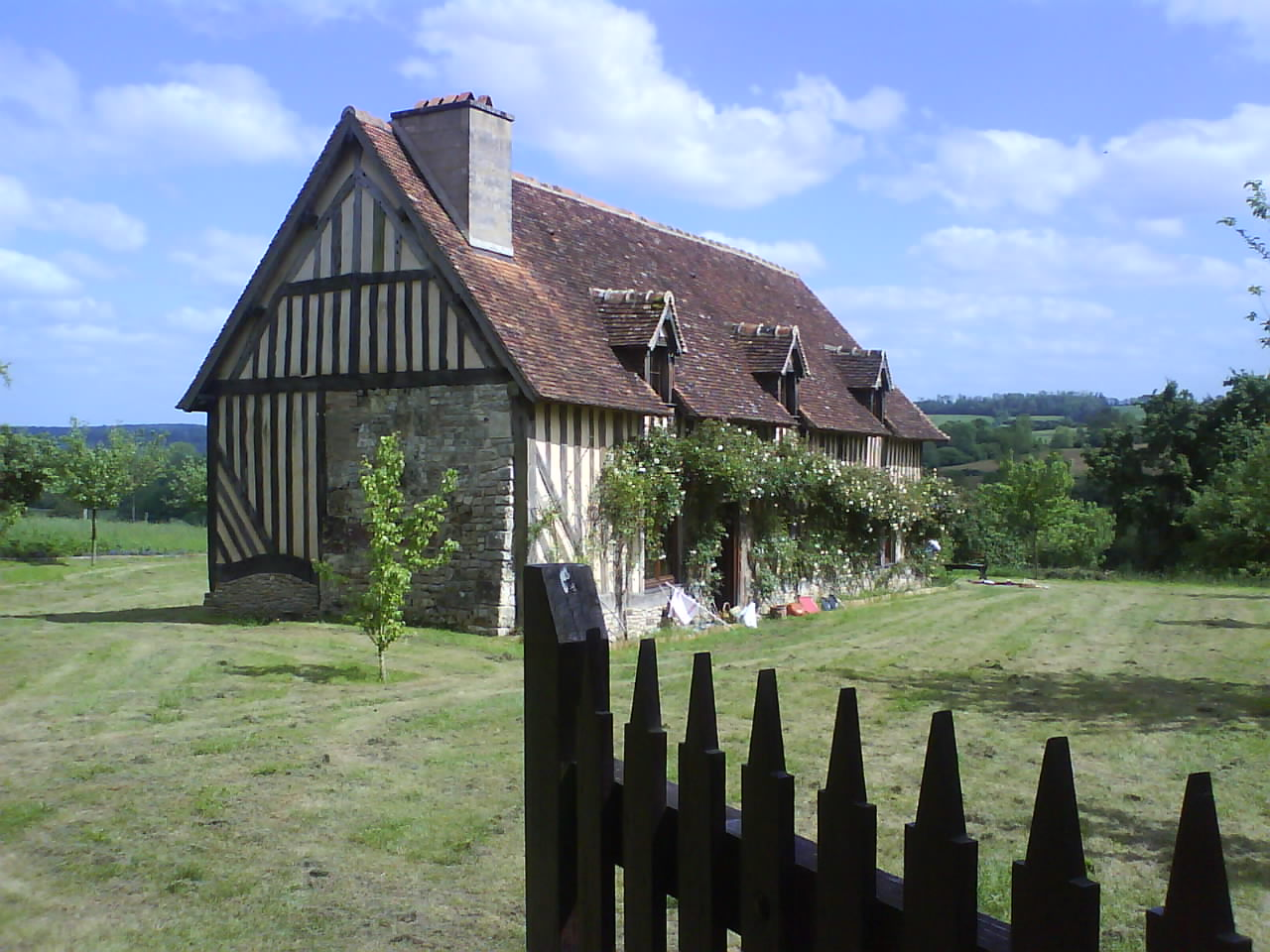
The house in Normandy where Corday was born

Born in Saint-Saturnin-des-Ligneries, a hamlet in the commune of Écorches (Orne), in Normandy, Corday was a member of a minor aristocratic family. Her father was Jacques François de Corday, Seigneur d'Armont, and her mother was Charlotte Marie Jacqueline Gaultier de Mesnival. Her parents were cousins, and she was a fifth-generation descendant of the dramatist Pierre Corneille.

While she was a young girl, her older sister and her mother died. Her father, unable to cope with his grief over their deaths, sent Corday and her younger sister to the Abbaye aux Dames convent in Caen, where Corday had access to the abbey's library and first encountered the writings of Plutarch, Jean-Jacques Rousseau, and Voltaire. After 1791, she lived in Caen with her aunt, Madame le Coustellier de Bretteville-Gouville. The two developed a close relationship, and Corday was the sole heir to her aunt's estate.

Corday's physical appearance is described on her passport as "five feet and one inch ... [155 cm] hair and eyebrows auburn, eyes gray, forehead high, mouth medium size, chin dimpled, and an oval face".

== Political influence ==
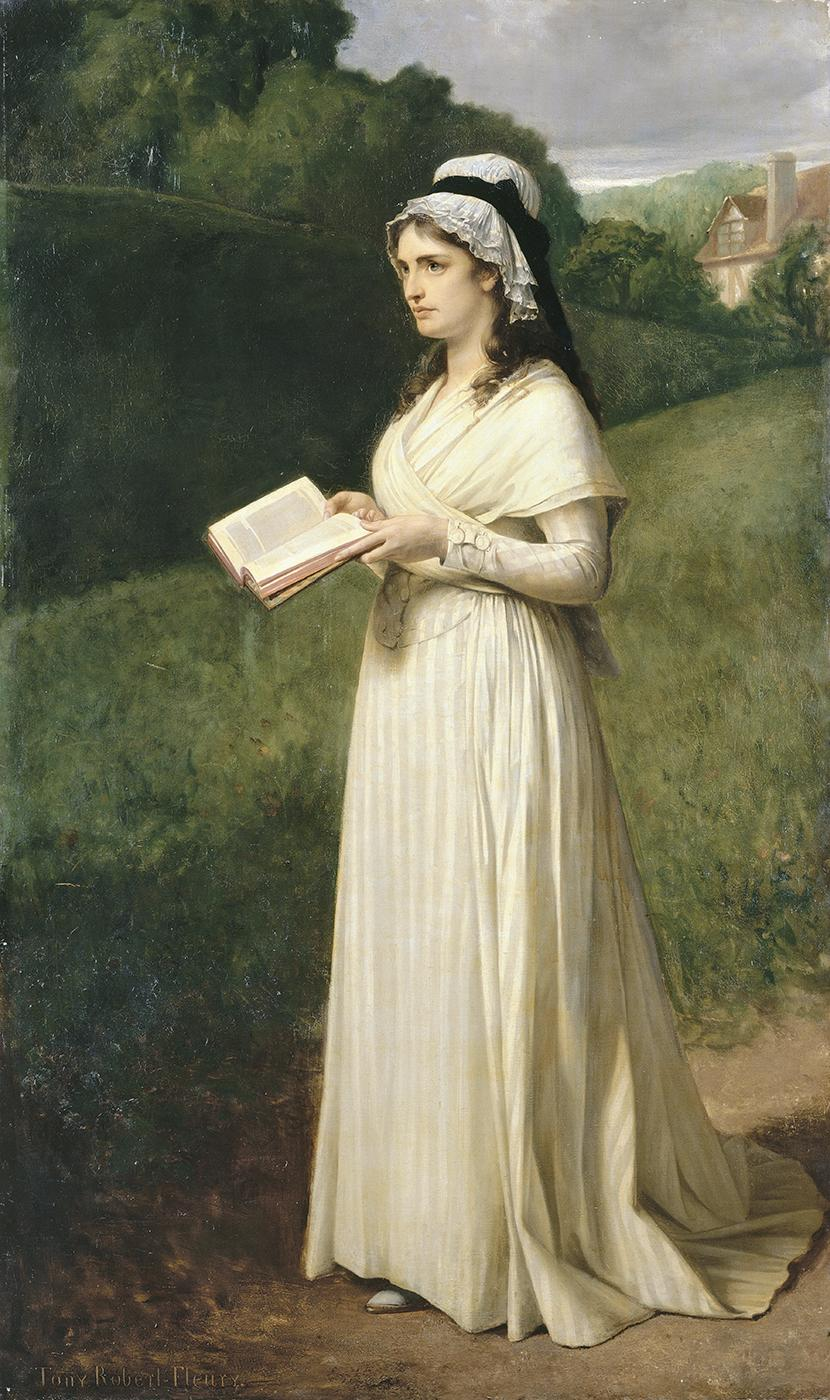
Charlotte Corday à Caen en 1793 by Tony Robert-Fleury

After the National Convention radicalised further and headed towards terror, Corday began to sympathise with the Girondins. She admired their speeches and grew fond of many of the Girondist groups whom she met while living in Caen. She respected the political principles of the Girondins and came to align herself with their thinking. She regarded them as a movement that would ultimately save France. The Girondins represented a more moderate approach to the revolution and they, like Corday, were sceptical about the direction the revolution was taking. They opposed the Montagnards, who advocated a more radical approach to the revolution, which included the extreme idea that the only way the revolution would survive invasion and civil war was through terrorising and executing those opposed to it.

The influence of Girondin ideas on Corday is evident in her words at her trial: "I have killed one man to save a hundred thousand." As the revolution progressed, the Girondins had become progressively more opposed to the radical, violent propositions of the Montagnards such as Marat and Maximilien Robespierre. Corday's notion that she was saving a hundred thousand lives echoes this Girondin sentiment as they attempted to slow the revolution and reverse the violence that had escalated since the September Massacres of 1792.

== Assassination of Jean-Paul Marat ==
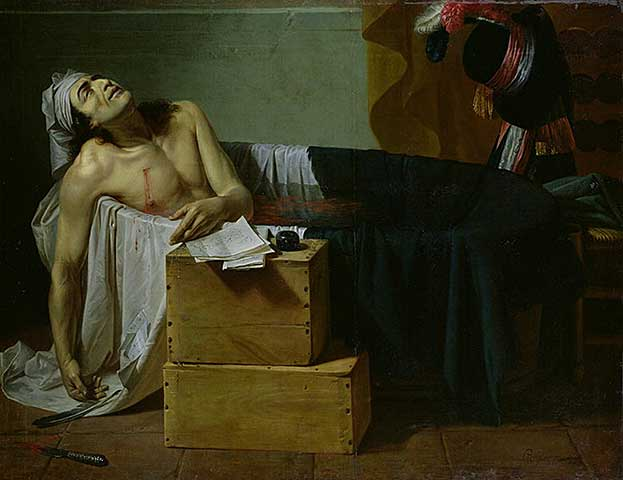
The Death of Marat by Guillaume-Joseph Roques (1793); a knife lies on the floor at lower left in the paintings by Roques and David

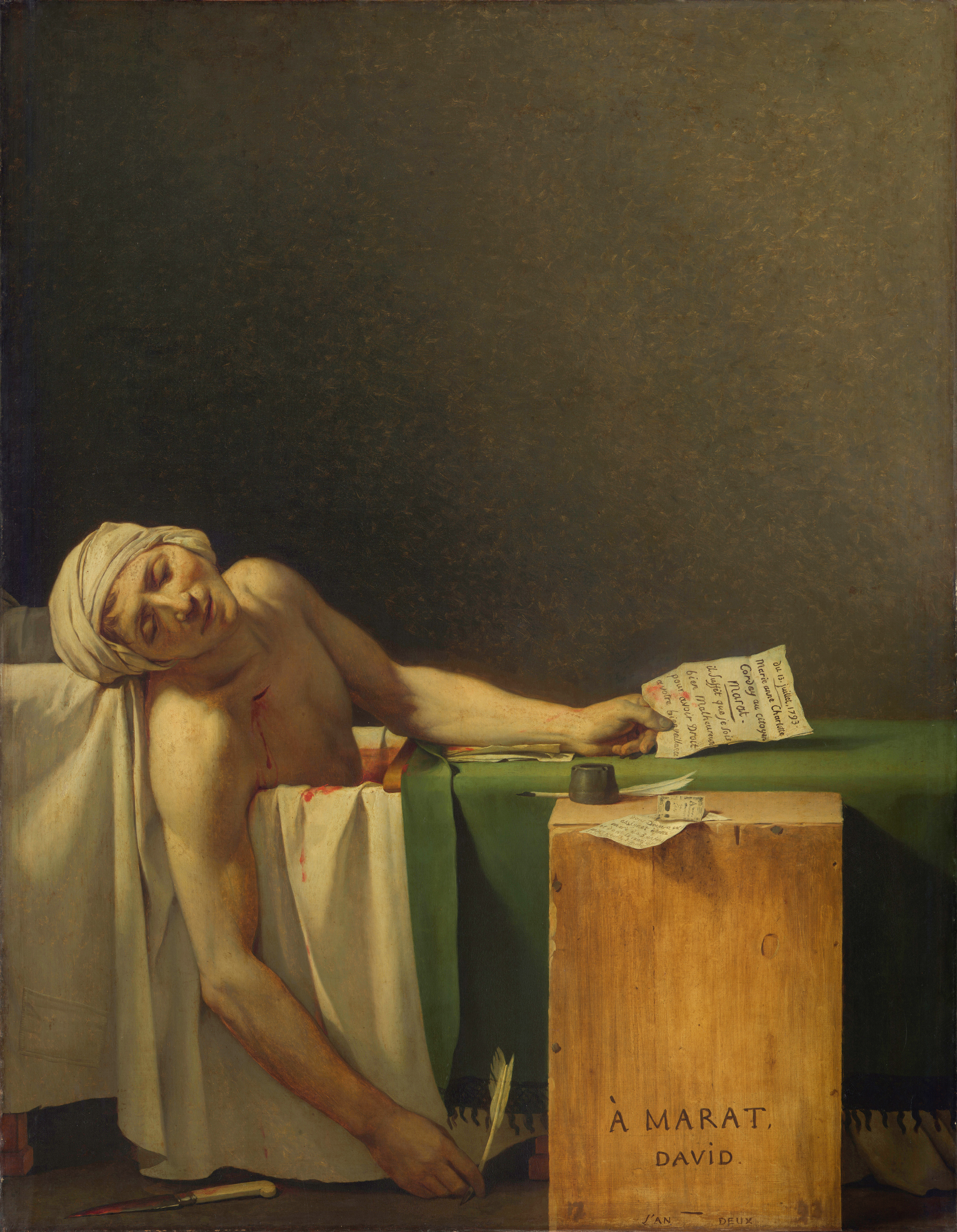
The Death of Marat by Jacques-Louis David (1793)

Alfred Dehodencq Étude pour l'Arrestation de Charlotte Corday (1853)

Jean-Paul Marat was a member of the radical Jacobin faction that had a leading role during the Reign of Terror. As a journalist, he exerted power and influence through his newspaper, L'Ami du peuple ("The Friend of the People"). She believed that Marat was threatening the republic and that his death would end violence throughout the country.

On 9 July 1793 Corday left her aunt, carrying a copy of Plutarch's Parallel Lives, and went to Paris where she took a room at the Hôtel de Providence. She bought a kitchen knife with a 5-inch (13 cm) blade. During the next few days, she wrote her Adresse aux Français amis des lois et de la paix ("Address to the French, friends of Law and Peace") to explain her motives for assassinating Marat. Corday initially planned to assassinate Marat in front of the entire National Convention. She intended to make an example of him, but upon arriving in Paris she discovered that Marat no longer attended meetings because his health was deteriorating from a skin disorder (perhaps dermatitis herpetiformis). She was then forced to change her plan. She went to Marat's home before noon on 13 July, claiming to have knowledge of a planned Girondist uprising in Caen; she was turned away by Catherine Evrard, the sister of Marat's fiancée Simonne.

She returned again that evening, Simonne was about to turn her away again but Corday raised her voice so Marat could hear she had a list of names. It was Marat who called out "let her in". At the time, he conducted most of his affairs from a bathtub because of his skin condition. Marat wrote down the names of the Girondins that she gave to him; she then pulled out the knife and plunged it into his chest. He called out: Aidez-moi, ma chère amie! ("Help me, my dear friend!"), and then died.

In response to Marat's dying shout, Evrard rushed into the room. She was joined by a distributor of Marat's newspaper, who seized Corday. Two neighbours (a military surgeon and a dentist) attempted to revive Marat. Republican officials arrived to interrogate Corday and to calm an angry crowd that appeared ready to lynch her.

== Trial ==
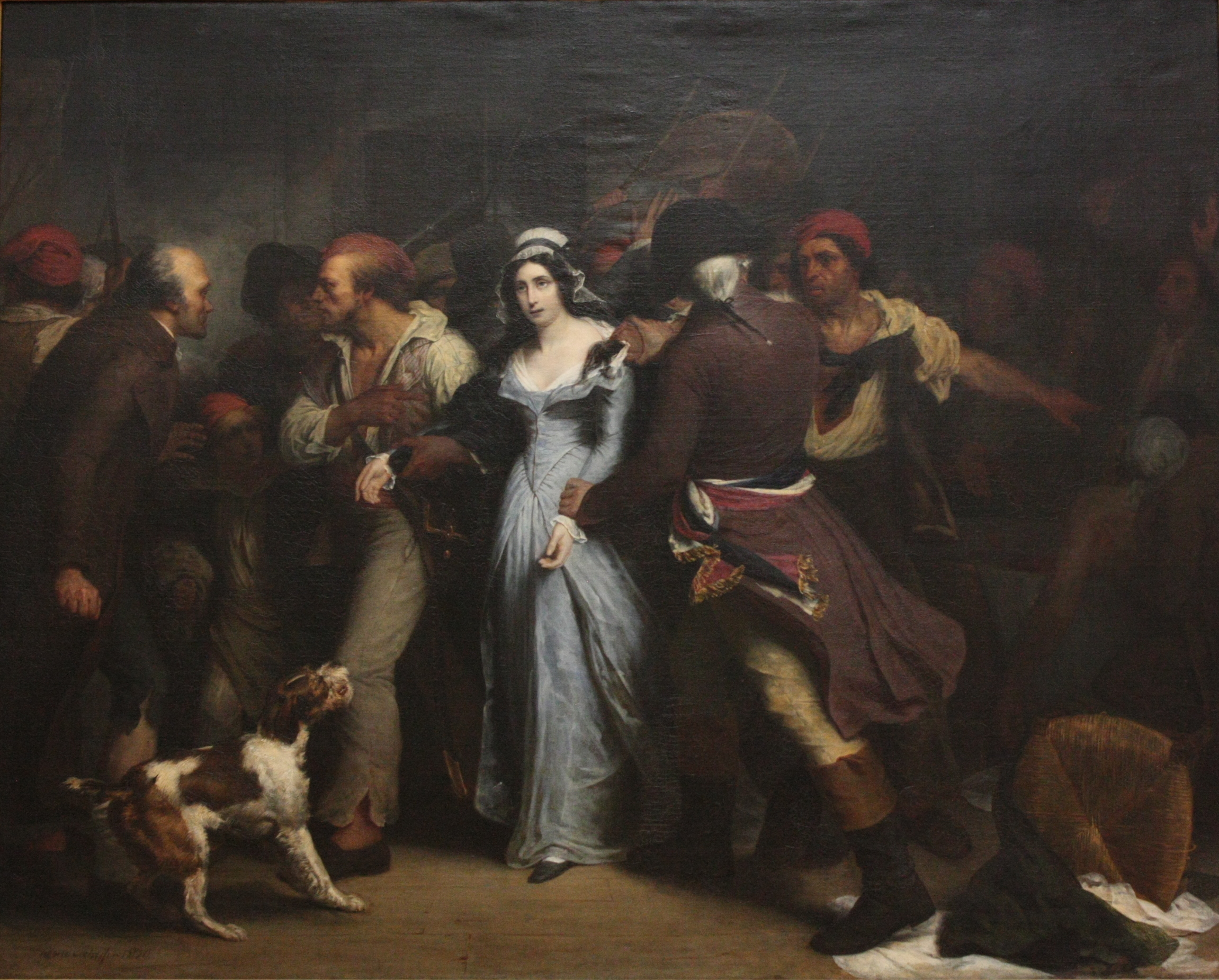
The Arrest of Charlotte Corday by Hendrik Scheffer, 1830

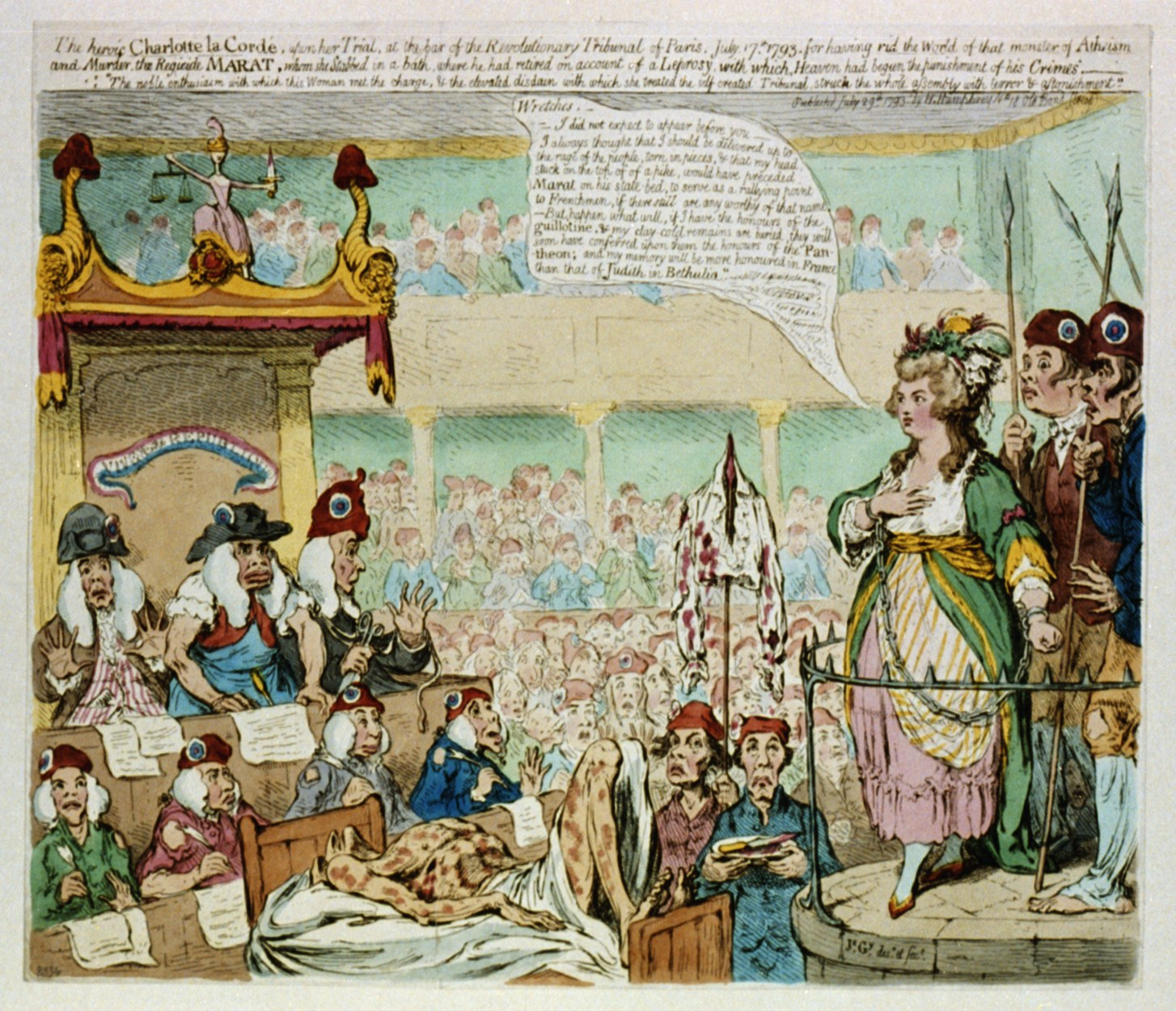
Caricature of Corday's trial by James Gillray, 1793

Corday sent the following farewell letter to her father which was intercepted and read during the trial, the letter helping to establish that Marat's murder was premeditated:

Forgive me, my dear papa, for having disposed of my existence without your permission. I have avenged many innocent victims, I have prevented many other disasters. The people, one day disillusioned, will rejoice in being delivered from a tyrant. If I tried to persuade you that I was passing through England, it was because I hoped to keep it incognito, but I recognized the impossibility. I hope you will not be tormented. In any case, I believe that you would have defenders in Caen. I took Gustave Doulcet as a defender: such an attack allows no defense, it's for the form. Goodbye, my dear papa, please forget me, or rather rejoice in my fate, the cause is good. I kiss my sister whom I love with all my heart, as well as all my parents. Do not forget this verse by [Pierre] Corneille:

Crime is shame, not the scaffold!
It is tomorrow at eight o'clock that I am judged. This 16 July.

Corday underwent three separate cross-examinations by senior revolutionary judicial officials, including the president of the Revolutionary Tribunal and the chief prosecutor. She stressed that she was a republican and had been so even before the revolution, citing the values of ancient Rome as an ideal model. The focus of the questioning was to establish whether she had been part of a wider Girondist conspiracy. Her interrogators were not willing to believe that a woman had done such a high profile crime alone. In fact they went as far to say during the trial "it did not seem natural that she had conceived this execrable plan of her own volition" (translated from its original French). Despite this pusback Corday remained constant in insisting that "I alone conceived the plan and executed it." She referred to Marat as a "hoarder" and a "monster" who was respected only in Paris. She credited her fatal knifing of Marat with one blow not to practising in advance but to luck.

Corday asked for Gustave le Doulcet, an old acquaintance, to defend her, but he did not receive the letter she wrote to him in time, so Claude François Chauveau-Lagarde was appointed instead to assist her during the trial. It is believed that Antoine Quentin Fouquier-Tinville deliberately delayed the letter; it is said that Corday thought that le Doulcet refused to defend her and sent to him a last letter of reproach just before going to the scaffold.

== Execution ==
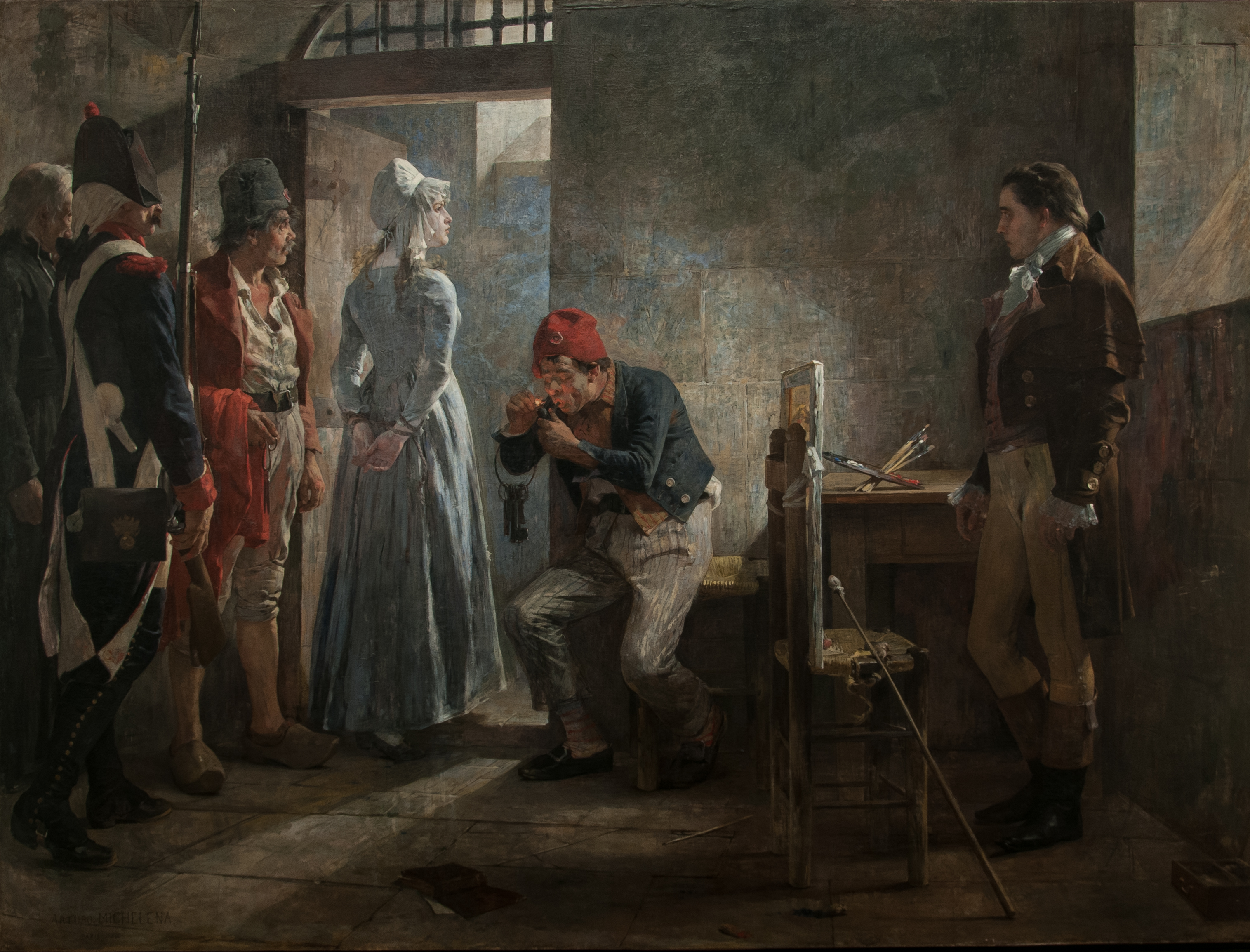
Charlotte Corday being conducted to her execution, by Arturo Michelena (1889). The warden carries the red blouse worn by Corday and the painter Hauer stands at the right.

Following her sentencing Corday asked the court if her portrait could be painted, purportedly to record her true self. She made her request pleading, "Since I still have a few moments to live, might I hope, citizens, that you will allow me to have myself painted." Given permission, she selected as the artist a National Guard officer, Jean-Jacques Hauer, who had already begun sketching her from the gallery of the courtroom. Hauer's likeness was completed shortly before Corday was summoned to the tumbril, after she had viewed it and suggested a few changes.

Since her execution, many authors have written describing Corday as a natural blonde, primarily ascribed from the portrait by Hauer. Possibly to give the idea that she had taken the time to make herself presentable and powder her hair before murdering Marat, Hauer painted Corday's hair a very light shade. Despite the fame of this portrait, many other paintings (done both in life and posthumously) show Corday in her true brunette form, and her passport describes her hair as "chestnut" (châtains), refuting the idea that Corday had fair hair. Throughout her trial and after her death a lot of weight was placed on Corday's appearance. One popular French newspaper described her as "not at all pretty; she was a virago, brawny rather than fresh, without grace, untidy.” The author of this article used this to justify her murder of Marat, stating that "it follows that this woman had thrown herself absolutely outside of her sex.

On 17 July 1793, four days after Marat was killed, Corday was executed by the guillotine in the Place de Grève wearing the red overblouse denoting a condemned traitor who had assassinated a representative of the people. Standing alone in the tumbril amid a large and curious crowd she remained calm, although drenched by a sudden summer rainfall. Her body was buried in the Madeleine Cemetery. Her skull was said to have been removed from her grave and passed from person to person in later years.

== Aftermath ==
After Corday's decapitation, a man named Legros lifted her head from the basket and slapped it on the cheek. Charles-Henri Sanson, the executioner, indignantly rejected published reports that Legros was one of his assistants. Sanson stated in his diary that Legros was in fact a carpenter who had been hired to make repairs to the guillotine. Witnesses report an expression of "unequivocal indignation" on her face when her cheek was slapped. The oft-repeated anecdote has served to suggest that victims of the guillotine may in fact retain consciousness for a short while, including by Albert Camus in his Reflections on the Guillotine ("Charlotte Corday's severed head blushed, it is said, under the executioner's slap"). This offence against a woman who had been executed just moments before was considered unacceptable, and Legros was imprisoned for three months because of his outburst.

Jacobin leaders had her body autopsied immediately after her death to see if she was a virgin. They believed there was a man sharing her bed and the assassination plans. To their dismay, a non-scientific virginity test persuaded them that she was a virgin.

Corday's action aided in restructuring the private versus public role of the woman in society at the time. The idea of women as second class or less was challenged, and Corday was considered a heroine to those who were against the teachings of Marat. There have been suggestions that her act incited the banning of women's political clubs and the executions of female activists such as the Girondin Madame Roland. Corday's act transformed the idea of what a woman was capable of, and to those who did not shun her for her act she was a heroine. André Chénier, for example, wrote a poem in honour of Corday. This highlighted the "masculinity" possessed by Corday during the revolution.

French (original)

La vertu seule est libre. Honneur de notre histoire,
Notre immortel opprobre y vit avec ta gloire,
Seule tu fus un homme, et vengeas les humains.
Et nous, eunuques vils, troupeau lâche sans âme,
Nous savons répéter quelques plaintes de femme,
Mais le fer pèserait à nos débiles mains.

Translation:
English (translation)

Virtue alone is free. Honor of our history,
Our immortal opprobrium lives there with your glory,
Only you were a man, and avenged the humans.
And we, vile eunuchs, a cowardly herd without a soul,
We know how to repeat a few complaints from a woman,
But the iron would be heavy in our feeble hands.

Corday's killing of Marat was considered vile, an "arch-typically masculine statement", which reaction showed that whether or not one approved of what she did, it is clear that the murder of Marat changed the political role and position of women during the French Revolution. Corday was surprised by the reaction of revolutionary women, stating, "As I was truly calm I suffered from the shouts of a few women. But to save your country means not noticing what it costs."

== Legacy ==
Corday's likeness as well as the assassination have been reproduced by several artists, such as Jacques-Louis David's 1793 painting The Death of Marat; Paul-Jacques-Aimé Baudry's 1860 painting Charlotte Corday. Alphonse de Lamartine devoted to her a book of his Histoire des Girondins series (1847), in which he gave her this now-famous nickname: "l'ange de l'assassinat" (the angel of assassination).

Several streets in France bear her name, including Rue Charlotte Corday in Argentan, Verson, and Vimoutiers; Avenue Charlotte Corday in Caen; and Square Charlotte Corday in Émerainville, an eastern suburb of Paris.

=== Media ===
- American dramatist Sarah Pogson Smith memorialised Corday in her 1807 verse drama The Female Enthusiast: A Tragedy in Five Acts.
- French dramatist François Ponsard wrote a play, Charlotte Corday, that was premièred at the Théâtre-Français in 1850.
- In 1894, Kyrle Bellew penned a play in four acts detailing the assassination entitled Charlotte Corday, taking the role of Marat, while his acting partner Cora Urquhart Brown-Potter played as Charlotte Corday.
- The 1919 German silent film Charlotte Corday stars Lya Mara in the title role.
- In 1939, Drieu La Rochelle wrote a play in three acts called Charlotte Corday.
- In Peter Weiss's 1963 Marat/Sade, the assassination of Marat is presented as a play, written by the Marquis de Sade, to be performed for the public by inmates of the asylum at Charenton.
- Italian composer Lorenzo Ferrero composed an opera in three acts, Charlotte Corday, for the 200th anniversary of the French Revolution which was commemorated in 1989.
- Agatha Christie referred to Charlotte Corday in her 1948 novel Crooked House. It was spelt "Charlot Korday" in the book to stay within the context of the story, as it was part of a diary entry in the "little black book" of a young girl.
- American playwright Lauren Gunderson made Charlotte Corday a character in her 2016 play "The Revolutionists"

== Gallery ==
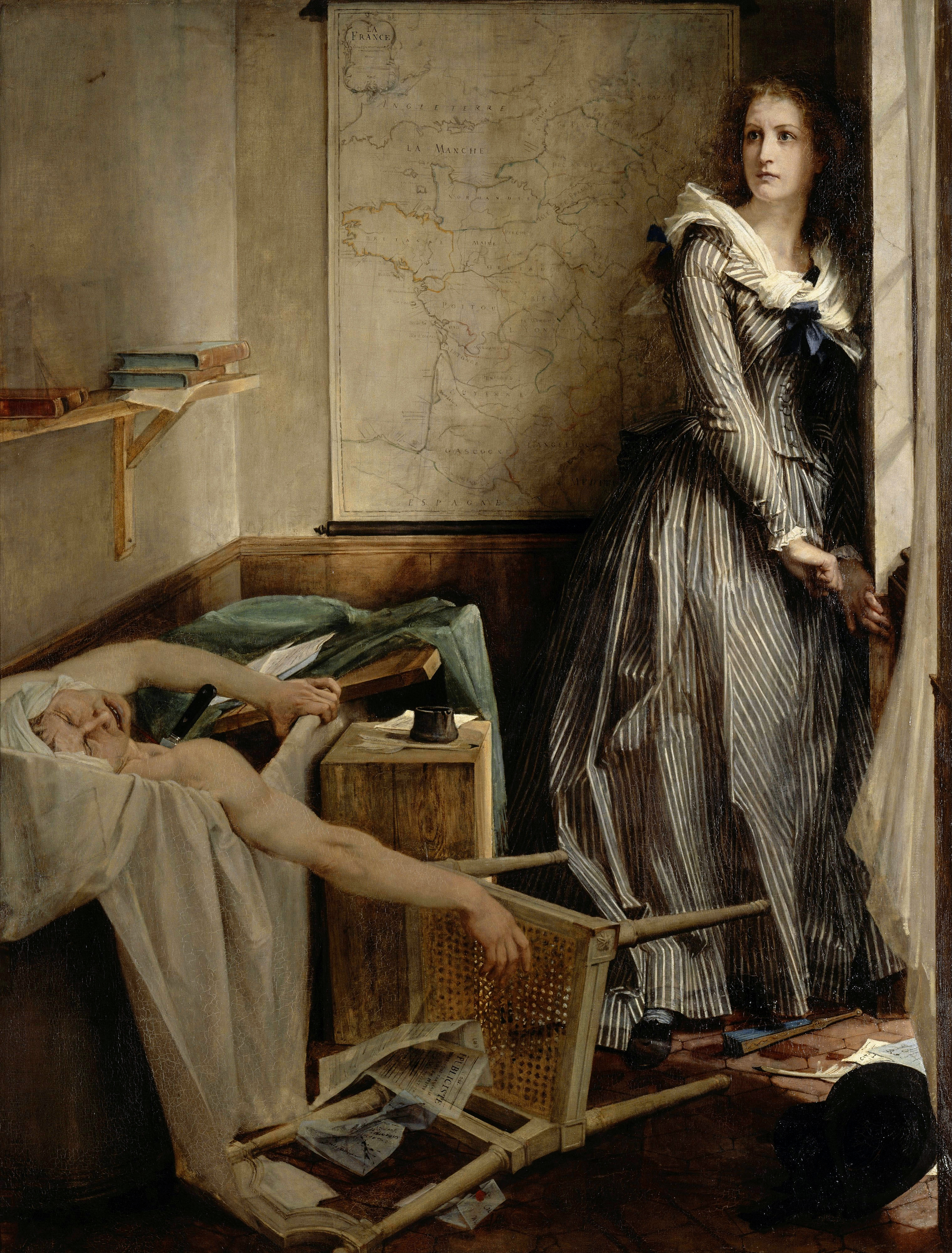
Charlotte Corday by Paul-Jacques-Aimé Baudry (c. 1860)

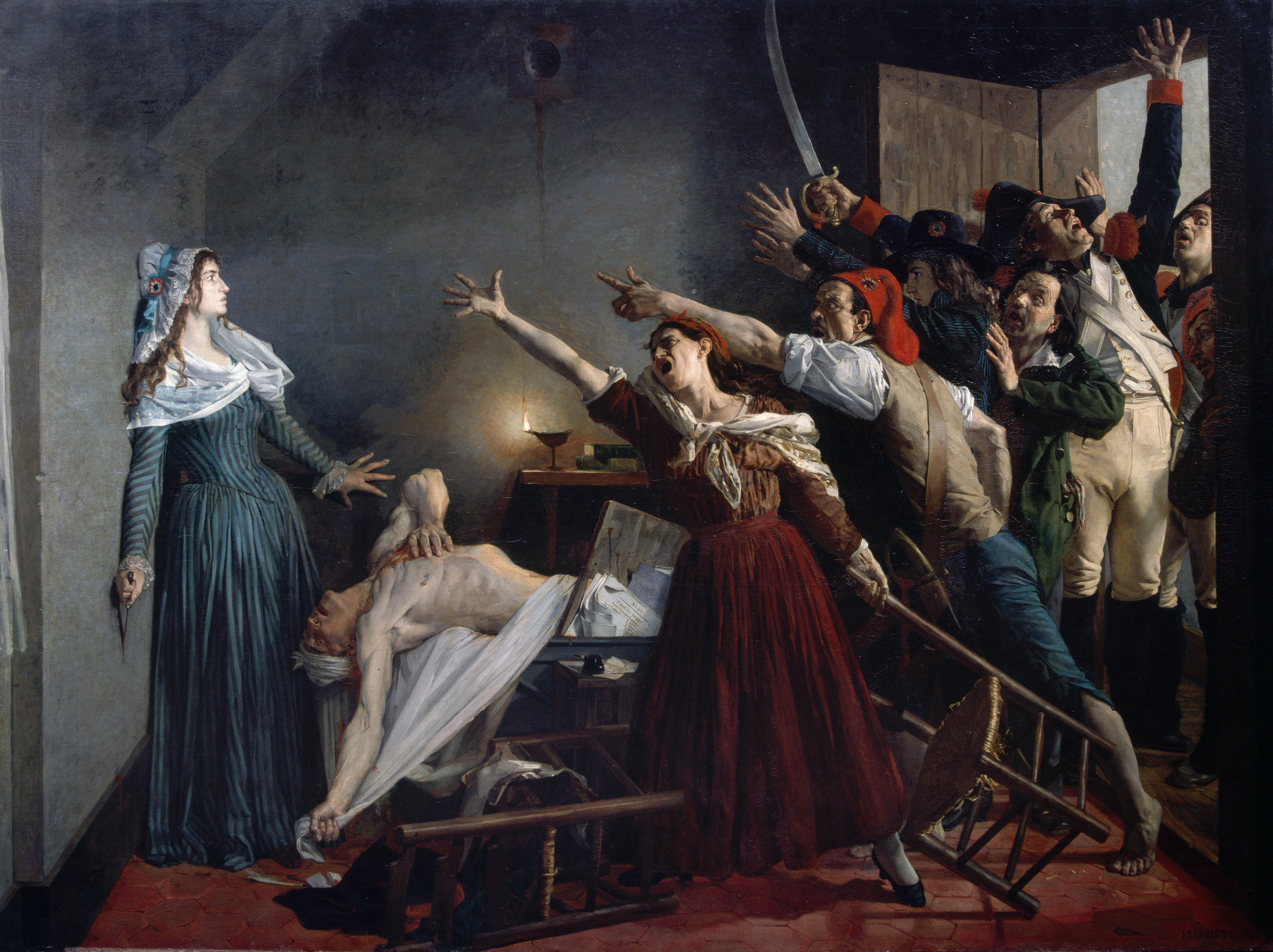
The Assassination of Marat by Jean-Joseph Weerts (1880)

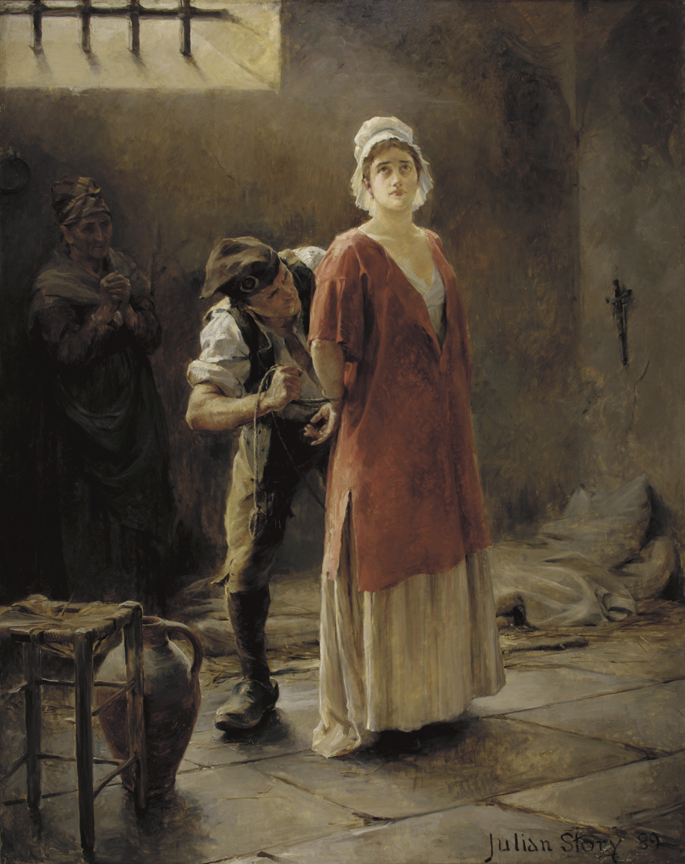
Painting of Charlotte Corday by Julian Story (1889)

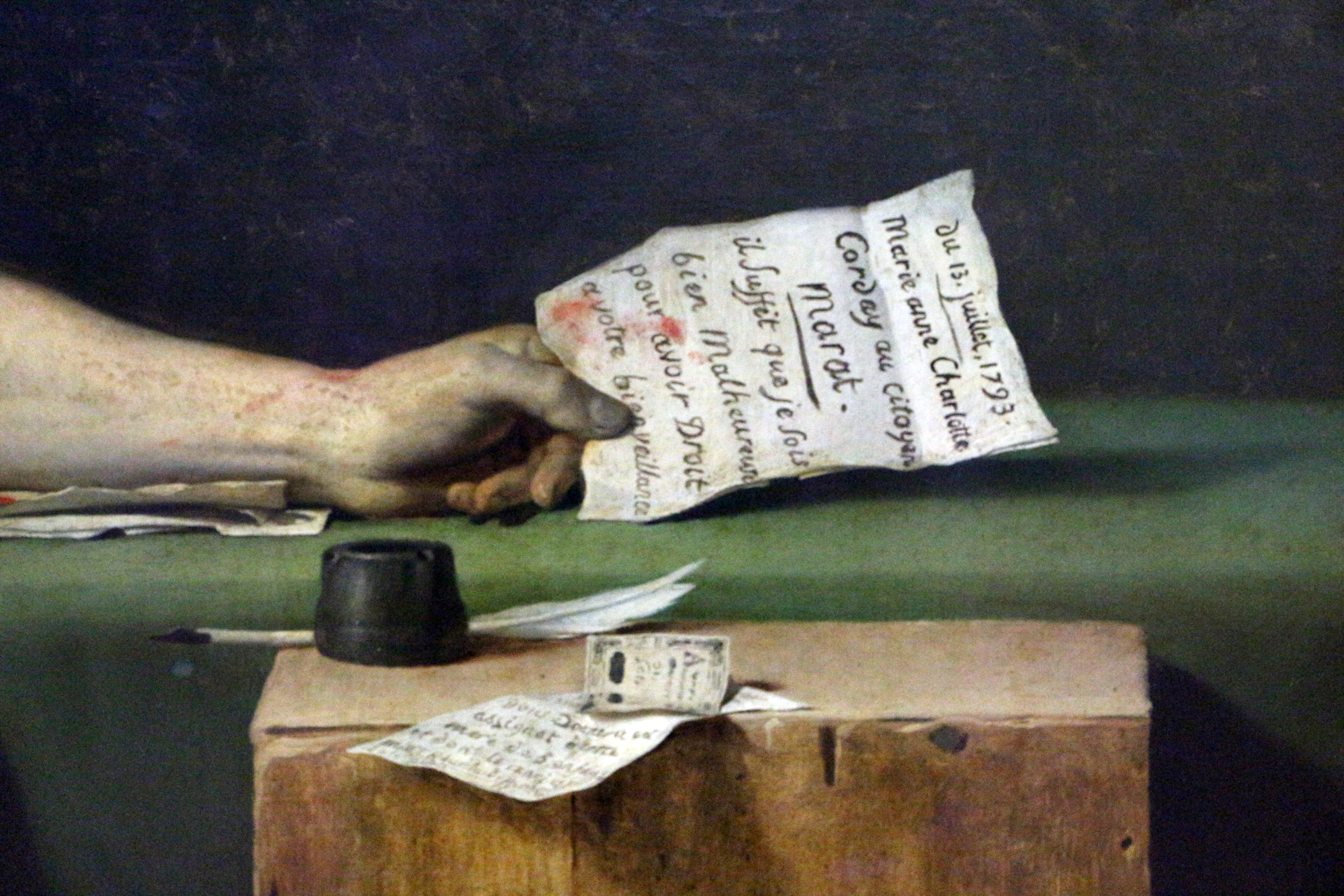
Detail from The Death of Marat by Jacques-Louis David. Marat's dead hand grips a piece of bloody paper which reads, "July 13, 1793. Marie Anne Charlotte Corday to Citizen Marat. Suffice it to say that I am very unhappy to be entitled to your benevolence."

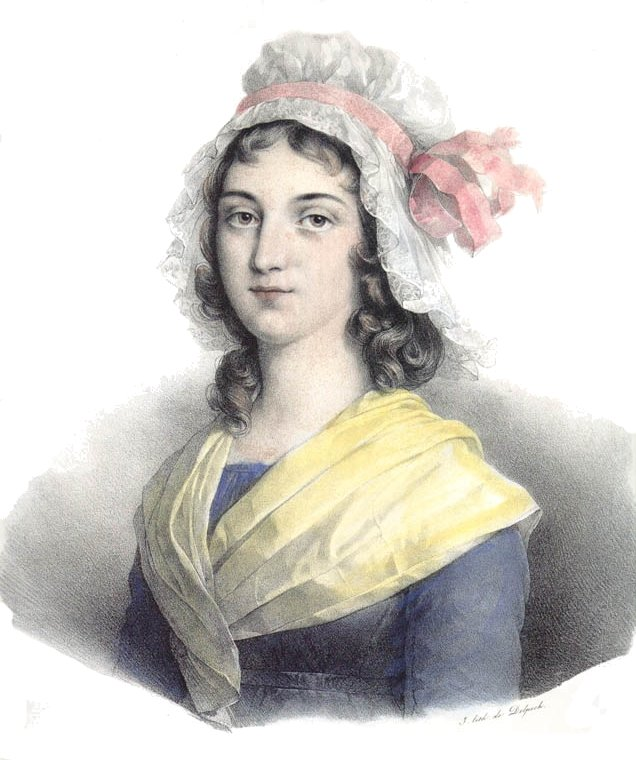
Charlotte Corday by François-Séraphin Delpech
