= Emma Appleton =

English actress and model

- Born: Emma Jill Appleton; 11 December 1991 (age 34); Witney, Oxfordshire, England
- Occupations: Actress; model
- Years active: 2015–present

Emma Jill Appleton (born 11 December 1991) is an English actress and model. She starred in the Channel 4 spy thriller Traitors (2019) and the BBC adaptation of Everything I Know About Love (2022). Her films include LOLA (2022). She also appeared in the BBC Three thriller Clique (2017), the Netflix fantasy series The Witcher (2019), and the Hulu miniseries Pistol (2022).

== Early life and education ==
Emma Jill Appleton was born and raised in Witney, Oxfordshire. She attended West Witney Primary School and then Wood Green School. She was a contemporary of Dan Tomlinson. Appleton was interested in drama from an early age and participated in it at school.

== Career ==
Appleton began her career in modelling as a teenager, appearing at events for Victoria Beckham, The Kooples, Margaret Howell and DAKS, and advertising brands such as Fred Perry, Toni & Guy, Rimmel and Converse.

Appleton went into acting in 2016 when she appeared as Pixie in the short film Dreamlands. This was followed by her television debut with a recurring role as Fay Brookstone in the first series of the BBC Three thriller Clique. She also made guest appearances in the first series of the Channel 4 comedy-drama The End of the F***ing World and an episode of the ITV detective drama Grantchester.

In 2018, she appeared in two episodes of the National Geographic anthology Genius, about Picasso, who was played by Antonio Banderas.

In 2019, Appleton was cast in her first lead role as Feef Symonds in the Channel 4 spy thriller Traitors. Later that year, Appleton played Princess Renfri in the first season of the Netflix fantasy series The Witcher. Appleton made her feature film debut in the 2021 romantic drama The Last Letter from Your Lover, also on Netflix. She guest starred as Mya Miller in two episodes of the Sky One science fiction series Intergalactic.

In 2022, Appleton portrayed Nancy Spungen in the Hulu biographical miniseries Pistol and starred alongside Bel Powley in the BBC adaptation of Dolly Alderton's Everything I Know About Love. The same year, Appleton had her first lead film role as Thomasina in LOLA along with Stefanie Martini.

Appleton has a starring role in the 2023 Paramount+ legal thriller The Killing Kind, opposite Colin Morgan.

== Personal life ==
In 2022, Appleton spoke of her partner Alex, a personal trainer she met through modelling.

== Filmography ==
=== Film ===
Year	Title	Role	Notes
2016	Dreamlands	Pixie	Short film
2017	The Nun	Elena	Uncredited role
2019	The Drink	Zoe	Short film
2021	The Last Letter from Your Lover	Hannah	
2022	LOLA	Thomasina Hanbury	
2025	Kotti	Katya	Short film
2025	The Severed Sun	Magpie	

=== Television ===
Year	Title	Role	Notes
2017	The End of the F***ing World	Kelly	1 episode: #1.1
2017	Grantchester	Sally	1 episode: #3.6
2017	Clique	Fay Brookstone	Recurring role; 6 episodes
2018	Genius	Germaine	2 episodes: "Picasso: Chapters Two and Three"
2019	Traitors	Feef Symonds	Main role; 6 episodes
2019	The Witcher	Renfri	2 episodes: "The End's Beginning" and "Much More"
2021	Intergalactic	Mya Miller	2 episodes: #1.7 and #1.8
2021	Pistol	Nancy Spungen	Mini-series; 2 episodes
2022	Everything I Know About Love	Maggie	Main role; 7 episodes
2023	The Killing Kind	Ingrid Lewis	Main role; 6 episodes
2024	The Road Trip	Addie	Main role; 6 episodes
2026	Gone	Alana Polly	Main role; 6 episodes
2026	Bytet (A Couple of Lies)	Scarlett Harris	Main role; 4 episodes
