= LOLA (film) =

2022 Irish film by Andrew Legge

- Directed by: Andrew Legge
- Written by: Andrew Legge; Angeli Macfarlane
- Produced by: Alan Maher; John Wallace
- Starring: Emma Appleton; Stefanie Martini
- Cinematography: Oona Menges
- Edited by: Colin Campbell
- Music by: Neil Hannon
- Production company: Cowtown Pictures
- Release date: 5 August 2022 (Locarno Film Festival)
- Running time: 79 minutes
- Countries: Ireland; United Kingdom
- Language: English

LOLA is a 2022 found footage science fiction film directed by Andrew Legge, starring Emma Appleton and Stefanie Martini. The film is Legge's feature directorial debut. It received the Méliès d'Or for Best European Fantastic Film.

== Plot ==
Two sisters, Thomasina (Thom) and Martha (Mars) Hanbury, grew up in isolation as orphans in an isolated house in the English countryside. Thomasina is a talented inventor, creating a machine called LOLA, named after their late mother, which has the capability to tap into radio and television signals from the future. The sisters use Lola primarily to listen to music from the future, until the Second World War breaks out. During the Blitz the women begin listening to news bulletins from the future and broadcasting clandestine radio messages to warn civilians to take cover from impending German air raids, saving many lives.

Lt. Sebastian Holloway of the Royal Corps of Signals attempts to locate the source of the broadcasts, eventually identifying the women. Holloway brings his superior officer Cobcroft to view the machine, suggesting that the women be allowed to listen to military radio frequencies. Cobcroft is sceptical, but agrees that Holloway remain at the house to authenticate and coordinate the messages. Using messages obtained from Lola, the Royal Air Force is able to destroy a significant number of German bombers, forcing the Luftwaffe to cancel further raids over Britain.

Mars and Holloway begin a romantic relationship. Thom becomes increasingly seduced by Lola's power, often banishing Mars and Holloway from the house so she can work undisturbed. The women start to see signs that their work with Lola is changing the course of the future. Mars becomes upset when she tries to tune in to a TV appearance by David Bowie from 1973, only to find that he has been replaced by a musician named Reginald Watson whose music has distinctly fascist themes. Thom orchestrates a trap for German U-boats in the Battle of the Atlantic. However, the operation resulted in the Germans sinking the American ship SS Abraham Lincoln, killing 2,000 people, and when word leaks that the British knew in advance that the Abraham Lincoln would be attacked, it leads to a decisive turning of American support away from Britain and the United States fails to enter the war against Germany.

With the United States declining to enter the war, the Germans attempt a second invasion of Britain. Thom hears signals indicating an invasion force would land the next day at Southampton. However, the following day the real invasion force lands at Dover, revealing that the signals heard the previous day must have been a German deception operation. Now suspecting that the women are double agents, Cobcroft has them arrested, tried, and sentenced to death.

As Thom and Mars are being led out of the courtroom, they are interrupted by a German attack on London. Holloway and Mars use the chaos to escape to Cornwall, while Thom is freed by the Germans and becomes a collaborator with the new fascist government led by Oswald Mosley and Edward VIII. Thom becomes a famous scientist, believing her research will help to create a perfect society. On a visit to Britain, Adolf Hitler visits her house. A bomb explodes, planted by Mars who is immediately captured and hanged on a tree in the front yard by the Germans. As she is hanging from the noose, Mars pulls out a gun and shoots several of the German soldiers. Thom successfully rescues Mars, but is shot by one of the Germans and dies. Mars concludes the film by saying that she made the movie in hopes that it will be broadcast and will be seen by past Thom, dissuading her from further work on Lola.

A title card at the end says that no trace of Lola has ever been found, and that the only known trace of the Hanbury sisters is a newspaper photograph in which they can be seen among a large crowd of people celebrating V-E Day. Mars is smiling and jubilant, while Thom is stony faced.

== Cast ==
- Emma Appleton as Thomasina "Thom" Hanbury
- Stefanie Martini as Martha "Mars" Hanbury (Martine)
- Rory Fleck Byrne as Lieutenant Sebastian Holloway
- Aaron Monaghan as Cobcroft
- Shaun Boylan as Reginald Watson
- Ayvianna Snow as Rebecca Cavendish

== Production ==
LOLA was shot in Ireland during lockdown. The scenes between the sisters in their house were shot on 16 mm Bolex and Arriflex cameras with period lenses, the newsreel scenes were shot on a 1930s Newman Sinclair 35 mm wind up camera on Kodak Double X film. The actresses were trained in how to use the cameras with Stefanie Martini operating the shots which her character is shooting. Much of the film was home processed using a Soviet era 16 mm developing tank. Neil Hannon of The Divine Comedy wrote the soundtrack which also features "Space Oddity" by David Bowie, a rearranged version of "You Really Got Me" by the Kinks and music by Elgar.

== Release ==
The film premiered at the Locarno Film Festival on 5 August 2022.

== Reception ==
On the review aggregation website Rotten Tomatoes the film has a 100% approval score based on 21 reviews and an average rating of 7.6/10. The site's consensus states: "LOLA stylishly fuses time-travel and found footage elements to craft a clever what-if story that buzzes with timeless ingenuity." David Ehrlich of IndieWire gave the film a rating of "B", writing that "The genius of Legge's design, and why his debut works as more than just a cute little curio despite its thinness, is that it mines a sneaky emotionality from the bedrock of the film-within-a-film structure." Jennie Kermode of Eye For Film gave the film four and a half stars, writing "Beautifully drawn characters lend a lot of heart to a story which might easily have been told in a more mechanical way, and keep the human factor prominent. Legge doesn't rely on the changing of the future to shock an audience which has heard that tale many times before, but weaves a more complex story, very neatly tied together and, in its totality, addressing one of science fiction's trickier big questions." She also praised the soundtrack, "Rounding out all this, and coming into full bloom as we begin to see more of the reshaped future, is some brilliantly rewritten music, exploring how key songs and movements might have turned out in a different cultural context. This provides a strange form of delight as the story grows increasingly dark." Kim Newman also praised the soundtrack "whose sinister dystopian glam rock is horribly convincing" and concluded "this is an ingenious, exhilarating film: it demands rewatches, revels in time-twisting inventiveness and has a lot to say about the actual present day as it contemplates how good intentions might muck up the past".

Fionnuala Halligan of Screen Daily wrote that it is "conceptually sharp, with wonderful period sound work". Alistair Harkness of The Scotsman rated the film three stars out of five, writing that "it's neatly done, even if the apparent ubiquity of film stock in 1940s Britain isn't quite as easily explained away as Thom and Martha's possession of a light-weight, hand-held, sound-recording camera." Kaleem Aftab of Time Out rated the film two stars out of five, writing that "There's much to admire here, but with Legge's keen eye for the technical side of cinema stronger than his narrative impulses, LOLA ultimately has to go down as an ambitious failure." Matthew Turner of Nerdly wrote "LOLA's use of archive footage is consistently inventive and largely flawless, to the point where you can't be sure if you're watching actual footage or something created especially for the movie (at least until Hitler shows up). Similarly, the script uses both real and imagined events of WWII to pose some intriguing questions about sacrifice and whether the ends justify the means, giving the film a strong present-day resonance in the process. On top of that, the use of music is equally inspired, whether it's Martha performing a rocking 1940s version of The Kinks' Girl, You Really Got Me Going (it's possible to see the implied effect on The Kinks' career as clever foreshadowing) or a vision of a dystopian future, where all pop music is fascist in tone (written by Hannon) and the biggest pop star in the world is 'Reginald Fucking Watson' (Shaun Boylan)." Starburst also praised the performances and soundtrack writing "Beautifully soundtracked and well shot (using, in part, period accurate cameras), Lola is a clever and charming sci-fi comedy. Appleton and Martini both impress as the sisters, drawing a believable portrait of sisterly love, camaraderie and vastly different expressions of what Doing The Right Thing looks like. Offbeat as it may be, the stakes are real, and Lola conjures a number of classic time travel dilemmas and paradoxes, ultimately tying into the found footage form itself. Offbeat and unexpected, a truly unique utilisation of medium and, uh, Neil Hannon from The Divine Comedy." Dallas King of FlickFeast also praised the originality of the film writing "Deftly combining multiple well-worn genres into something new and fresh, LOLA is one of the most original and compelling science fiction films of recent years." Wendy Ide of the Observer gave the film four out of five stars writing, "shot on film, using vintage equipment, the picture has a scrappy, tactile quality, its ghostly black-and-white images scratched and scorched. Meanwhile, Neil Hannon's smartly used score envisages a chilling authoritarian future for pop music.
