= Traitors (TV series) =

British television drama miniseries

- Genre: Drama
- Created by: Bathsheba Doran
- Starring: Emma Appleton; Luke Treadaway; Michael Stuhlbarg; Keeley Hawes
- Country of origin: United Kingdom
- Original language: English
- No. of series: 1
- No. of episodes: 6

Production
- Running time: 52 minutes
- Production companies: 42; Twenty Twenty Television

Original release
- Network: Channel 4
- Release: 17 February – 24 March 2019

Traitors is a British television drama miniseries created by Bathsheba Doran and broadcast by Channel 4 and Netflix in 2019. Set in 1945 London after the end of World War Two, Traitors follows a young woman recruited by the American Office of Strategic Services to identify a Soviet spy in the Cabinet Office.

== Cast and characters ==
- Emma Appleton as Feef Symonds, a young, naive and intelligent upper-class civil servant in the Cabinet Office, recruited as an agent by the United States Office of Strategic Services (OSS)
- Luke Treadaway as Hugh Fenton, a Labour Party Member of Parliament for a constituency in Derbyshire, and Royal Tank Regiment veteran
- Michael Stuhlbarg as Thomas Rowe, a senior American agent handler of the OSS
- Keeley Hawes as Priscilla Garrick, a senior civil servant of the Cabinet Office
- Brandon P. Bell as Jackson Cole, an American army driver and Rowe's assistant at the OSS
- Matt Lauria as Peter McCormick, an American army soldier and a staff of the OSS
- Greg McHugh as David Hennessey, a civil servant in the Ministry of Housing
- Jamie Blackley as Freddie Symonds, Feef's brother, a closeted gay man, and an unsuccessful Conservative Party parliamentary candidate
- Danny Sapani as Richard, an American communist living in London
- Bijan Daneshmand as Abu Selim, Minister from the Arab League addressing the Cabinet Office

== Music ==
The series begins and each episode ends, with a recording of the Pete Seeger song "There Is Mean Things Happening in This Land", recorded for the purpose by Graham Coxon.

== Episodes ==
No. in series	Title	Directed by	Written by	Original release date	UK viewers (millions)
1	"Feef"	Dearbhla Walsh	Bathsheba Doran	17 February 2019	N/A
In 1945 London, Feef, a vibrant English twenty-something is seduced by an American agent into spying on her own country. Her task is to find a Soviet mole leaking secrets from the heart of government.
2	"Hugh"	Dearbhla Walsh	Bathsheba Doran	24 February 2019	N/A
Feef's lover goes missing, just as things begin to heat up in her hunt for the Soviet mole. And she commits her first personal betrayal when she's instructed to spy on the MP who is falling for her.
3	"Priscilla"	Dearbhla Walsh	Bathsheba Doran	3 March 2019	N/A
The truth about Jarvis is revealed. And the Soviet mole begins to notice Feef's mission. The game of cat and mouse is on and the stakes are deadly.
4	"Rae"	Alex Winckler	Emily Ballou	10 March 2019	N/A
Feef makes an enemy of her handler when she threatens to quit and reveal all - just as a trap is laid for her by the Soviet mole, who will kill the unknowing Feef if she makes the wrong move.
5	"Jackson"	Alex Winckler	Tracey Scott Wilson	17 March 2019	N/A
Feef finds out what happened to her missing lover and who the mole is. She kills one enemy but makes a deadlier one. Time is running out, her life is at risk and she doesn't have any allies left.
6	"It's Me"	Alex Winckler	Bathsheba Doran	24 March 2019	N/A
With no one left to protect her, Feef is forced into the mole's path when she is asked to try to 'turn' them and escape a dangerous, new enemy. Hugh gives her an ultimatum.
