= French history in the English-speaking theatre =

French history has been the basis of plays in the English-speaking theatre since the English Renaissance theatre.

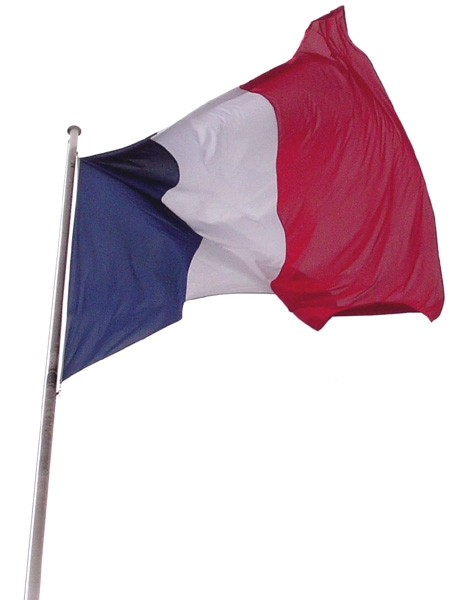

== 16th century ==
=== Charles IX ===
Christopher Marlowe wrote The Massacre at Paris (1593), based on events during the reign of Charles IX of France, king from 1560 to 1574 and of Henry III of France, king from 1574 to 1589. In the first scene, a marriage is celebrated between Marguerite of Valois, sister to Charles IX, and Henry of Navarre, king of Navarre, future Henry IV of France. Soon after, Gaspard de Coligny, leader of the Calvinist French Huguenot faction, is shot to death by a man in the hire of Henry I, Duke of Guise, leader of the Catholic League, an event which precipitates the St Bartholomew's Day Massacre in August 1572.

=== Philip II ===
William Shakespeare wrote The Life and Death of King John (1596), Henry V (1599), Henry VI, part 1 (1592), Henry VI, part 2 (1591), and Henry VI, part 3 (1591), based on events during the reigns of John of England, king from 1199 to 1216, Henry V of England, king from 1413 to 1422, Henry VI of England, king from 1422 to 1461 and from 1470 to 1471, Philip II of France, king from 1180 to 1223, Charles VI of France, king from 1380 to 1422, and Charles VII of France, king from 1422 to 1461.

In the first scene of King John, John of England receives a message from Philip II of France, demanding that he abdicate his throne to his nephew, Arthur I of Brittany, believed to be the rightful heir. When John refuses, war is declared. But to obtain a stronger claim to his throne and to appease the French (act 2, scene 1), John agrees to a marriage contract between Blanche of Castile, his niece, and Louis the Lion, Philip's son (1200). In 1203, John captures Arthur, who eventually dies (act 4, scene 3).

=== Charles VI ===
In the first scene of Henry V, Henry V of England asks noblemen and clergy whether he is entitled to the crown of France, who answer affirmatively, based on French Salic law. As a part of the Hundred Years' War, 1337–1453, the English forces invade France, besieging Harfleur (1415), act 3, scene 1, and defeat the French at the Battle of Agincourt (1415). In the final scene, the king marries Catherine of Valois (1420), daughter to King Charles VI.

=== Charles VII ===
In the first scene of Henry VI part 1 during the funeral procession of Henry V (1422), the duke of Bedford and other noblemen learn of military disasters at the hands of the French, led by the dauphin Charles, future King Charles VII, who successfully recapture several cities on French soil. In act 1 scene 8, the siege of Orleans is lifted (1429) by Charles with the help of Joan of Arc (1412–1431). In act 4, scene 1, during the coronation of Henry VI (1429), the Yorkists wear white roses on their hats, while the Lancastrians wear red roses, prefiguring the Wars of the Roses (1455–1485). In act 5 scene 6, Joan of Arc is condemned to be burnt alive, but no mention is made of her trial (1431). In the first scene of Henry VI part 2, King Henry VI of England marries Margaret of Anjou in 1445, of the House of Valois, niece to King Charles VII, arranged by the marquis of Suffolk, William de la Pole, 1st Duke of Suffolk as a way to influence the young king through her. In the marriage contract, the English lose the duchy of Anjou and the county of Maine and no dowry is given (Treaty of Tours, 1445). In the final scene, the Yorkists are victorious after the First Battle of St Albans (1455) during the Wars of the Roses. In the first scene of Henry VI part 3, the Yorkists confront the supporters of Henry VI, who discuss whether the king should accept the issue of the duke of York as king. Queen Margaret refuses to accept that her son, Edward, be disinherited. With her principal commander, Henry Beaufort, 3rd Duke of Somerset, she fights successfully for a while the Yorkists but is eventually defeated by them, whereby the son of Richard Plantagenet, 3rd Duke of York, is proclaimed King Edward IV of England and she sent away to France (1461).

== 17th century ==
=== Bussy d'Amboise ===
George Chapman wrote Bussy D'Ambois (1603), The Conspiracy and Tragedy of Charles, Duke of Byron (1608) and The Revenge of Bussy D'Ambois (1613), then with John Fletcher, Philip Massinger, and Ben Jonson, Rollo Duke of Normandy(1633), and with James Shirley The Tragedy of Chabot, Admiral of France (1639), based on events concerning Louis de Bussy d'Amboise (1549–1579) during the reign of Henry III of France, Charles de Gontaut, duc de Biron (1562–1602) during the reign of Henry IV of France, Rollo (c.846-c.931), Norse nobleman and first ruler of the Viking principality which became Normandy, and Philippe de Chabot (1492–1543) during the reign of Francis I of France.

In Bussy d'Ambois, one of the duels between Bussy and courtiers, eventually pardoned by Henry III, is mentioned. He seduces the wife of Montsoreau, and the husband traps and kills him (1579) in the final scene. In The revenge of Bussy D'Ambois, King Henry's guards assassinate Henry I, Duke of Guise (1588) (act 5, scene 4).

=== Biron ===
In The conspiracy of Byron, the duke's embassies on behalf of King Henry IV (Act 1) followed by his conspiracy with the duke of Savoy (starting with Act 2) are the main subject of the play. In The tragedy of Byron, for his conspiracy with the duke of Savoy, Byron is arrested (Act 4, scene 2), arraigned (Act 5, scene 1), sentenced to death (Act 5, scene 2), and his head is cut off at the prison of Bastille (1602) (Act 5, scene 4, final).

=== Chabot ===
In The Tragedy of Chabot, Admiral of France, Act 3, scene 2, Chabot is arraigned before a court of justice and condemned (1541). In the final scene, he sickens from being suspected and dies (1543).

=== Charles VIII ===
John Crowne wrote The History of Charles the Eighth of France, or The Invasion of Naples by the French (1672), based on events during the reign of Charles VIII of France, king from 1483 to 1498.

=== Duke of Guise ===
John Dryden and Nathaniel Lee wrote The Duke of Guise (1683), based on events during the reign of Henry III of France.

== 18th century ==
=== Charlotte Corday ===
Edmund John Eyre wrote The Maid of Normandy; or, the Death of the Queen of France (1794) concerning Charlotte Corday's murder of Jean-Paul Marat (1793) during the Reign of Terror.

=== Joan of Arc ===
Tom Taylor wrote Jeanne d'Arc (1871), based on the life of Joan of Arc (1412–1431).

=== Robespierre ===
Samuel Taylor Coleridge and Robert Southey wrote The fall of Robespierre (1794), based on events during the French Revolution, when Maximilien Robespierre led the Committee of Public Safety and was instrumental in combating the return of the old regime. In acts 2 and 3, together with Georges Couthon, Louis de Saint-Just, and his brother Augustin Robespierre, he is denounced as a tyrant and traitor by Jean-Lambert Tallien and others during the convention. He is overthrown and arrested (1794).

== 19th century ==
=== Francis I of France ===
Fanny Kemble wrote Francis the First (play) based on the life of Francis I of France (1494–1547).

=== Marat ===
Sarah Pogson Smith wrote another play on Charlotte Corday's murder of Jean-Paul Marat (1793) during the Reign of Terror, entitled The Female Enthusiast (1807).

=== Louis XI ===
Dion Boucicault wrote Louis XI (1855), an adaptation of a French play of the same title (1832) by Casimir Delavigne, based on events during the reign of Louis XI of France (1461–1483).

=== Richelieu ===
Edward Bulwer-Lytton wrote Richelieu (1839) based on the cardinal of the same name who dominated political events during the reign of Louis XIII of France (1601–1643).

=== Marie Antoinette ===
Harry Forrest and Paolo Giacometti wrote Marie Antoinette(1890), based on the life of Marie Antoinette.

=== Napoleon ===
George Bernard Shaw wrote The Man of Destiny (1897), based on events during the reign of Emperor Napoleon I of France (1769–1821). In the one-act play, General Napoleon Bonaparte has beaten the Austrians during the First Italian campaign at the Battle of Lodi (1796). Having recently married Joséphine de Beauharnais, he intercepts a letter meant to betray his wife's attachment to his friend, Paul François Jean Nicolas, vicomte de Barras (1755–1829), main executive leader of the Directory regime (1795–1799).

Another play on Bonaparte includes Richmond Sheffield Dement's Napoleon (1893).

== 20th century ==
=== Napoleon ===
Herbert Trench wrote his own Napoleon (1919).

=== Joan of Arc ===
Percy MacKaye wrote Jeanne d'Arc (1906), based on the life of Joan of Arc.

George Bernard Shaw also wrote on the life of Joan of Arc: Saint Joan (1923). In the first scene, Joan, with support from Jean de Metz and Bertrand de Poulengy, successfully petitions the garrison commander at Vaucouleurs, Robert de Baudricourt, for permission to visit the French royal court at Chinon (1429). During scene 4, mention is made of Joan's raising the siege of Orléans (1429) with Jean de Dunois, John of Orléans. Joan's trial at Rouen occurs in scene 6, with Pierre Cauchon, bishop of Beauvais as the main interrogator, where she is condemned to be burnt alive for heresy (1431).

Another play on Joan of Arc includes Joan la Romée (1926) by Frank Harris. There is also Joan of Lorraine (1946) by Maxwell Anderson. In a play-within-a-play framework, an acting company stage a dramatisation of the story of Joan of Arc.

=== Henry IV ===
William Devereux wrote Henry of Navarre (1909), based on the life of the eventual King Henry IV of France.

=== Madame du Barry ===
Madame du Barry, mistress of King Louis XV, is the subject of a 1901 play named after her by David Belasco.

=== Marquis de Sade ===
Doug Wright wrote Quills (1996), based on the life of the Marquis de Sade in the years of his imprisonment at Charenton, starting in 1803. The director of the institution, Abbé de Coulmier, seeks to prevent the marquis from communicating his writings, such as his novel, Justine. The relations between the marquis and Madeleine Leclerc, daughter of an employee at Charenton, are described.

== 21st century ==
=== Marie Antoinette ===
Marie Antoinette: the color of flesh (2007) by Joel Gross depicts the times of the young French queen while exploited by her portrait-painter, Élisabeth-Louise Vigée-Le Brun.

=== Henry III ===
In Henry III of France (2010), King Henry III of France struggles against the influence of Henry I, Duke of Guise (1588) during the French wars of religion, both killed, the latter by the king (1588, act 4, scene 4), the former by Jacques Clément, disguised as a priest (1589, act 5, scene 7, final scene).
