= The Experiment (upcoming film) =

- Directed by: Chee Keong Cheung
- Written by: Alistair Cave; Matthew Thomas Edwards; Oliver Morran
- Story by: Chee Keong Cheung
- Produced by: Chee Keong Cheung; Ioanna Karavela; Andreas Roald
- Starring: Rhona Mitra; Famke Janssen; Stefanie Martini; Roxanne McKee; Simon Dutton; Razaaq Adoti; Dominic Weatherill
- Cinematography: Derek Rogers
- Music by: Joseph Murray; Lodewijk Vos
- Production company: Action Xtreme
- Country: United Kingdom
- Language: English

The Experiment is an upcoming British science fiction action horror film directed by Chee Keong Cheung, and starring Rhona Mitra, Famke Janssen, Stefanie Martini, Roxanne McKee, Simon Dutton, Razaaq Adoti and Dominic Weatherill

== Premise ==
In the year 2080, in a world recovering from catastrophic nuclear war, an elite Spec-Ops team is sent on a rescue mission into a top-secret military research facility after a rogue employee takes a group of scientists hostage.

== Cast ==
- Rhona Mitra as Captain Ava Stone
- Famke Janssen as Doctor Rachel McVeigh
- Stefanie Martini as Kara Stone
- Roxanne McKee as Lincoln Jones
- Simon Dutton as John Orwell
- Razaaq Adoti as Dalton 'Mac' Maclean
- Dominic Weatherill as Lieutenant Stanton

== Production ==
In August 2022, it was reported that a science fiction action horror film directed by Chee Keong Cheung was in development. Principal photography began the next month at Rebellion Film Studios in Oxfordshire, with Rhona Mitra, Famke Janssen, Stefanie Martini, Roxanne McKee, Simon Dutton, and Razaaq Adoti joining the cast.
