= Crooked House (film) =

- Theatrical release poster
- Directed by: Gilles Paquet-Brenner
- Screenplay by: Julian Fellowes; Tim Rose Price; Gilles Paquet-Brenner
- Based on: Crooked House by Agatha Christie
- Produced by: James Spring; Sally Wood; Joseph Abrams
- Starring: Glenn Close; Terence Stamp; Max Irons; Stefanie Martini; Julian Sands; Gillian Anderson; Christina Hendricks; Roger Ashton-Griffiths
- Cinematography: Sebastian Winterø
- Edited by: Peter Christelis
- Music by: Hugo de Chaire
- Production companies: Brilliant Films; Metro International Entertainment; Fred Films
- Distributed by: Vertical (United States); Stage 6 Films (International)
- Release date: 31 October 2017 (Italy)
- Running time: 115 minutes
- Countries: United Kingdom; United States
- Language: English
- Budget: $10 million

Crooked House is a 2017 mystery film directed by Gilles Paquet-Brenner, based on Agatha Christie’s 1949 novel of the same name. A British-American coproduction, the film stars Max Irons, Terence Stamp, Glenn Close, Gillian Anderson, and Stefanie Martini. Principal photography began in September 2016, and the film aired in the UK on Channel 5 on 17 December 2017.

== Plot ==
In mid-1950s London, Sophia Leonides, granddaughter of the late Greek-born business tycoon Aristide Leonides, visits private investigator Charles Hayward. She asks Charles to investigate Aristide's death, suspecting that he has been murdered. Charles agrees reluctantly, feeling conflicted due to an earlier love affair with Sophia in Cairo. Charles seeks the consent of Chief Inspector Taverner of Scotland Yard to look into the case.

Aristide had been the bullying and manipulative patriarch of the large and idiosyncratic Leonides family who all lived together on the family estate. He had died from a heart attack after his regular insulin injection – given by his wife Brenda – had been laced with eserine from his eye drops. Brenda is Aristide's second wife, a former casino dancer who is much younger than her husband.

Lady Edith de Haviland is the sister of Aristide's late first wife, fond of stalking the grounds and blasting moles in the lawn with a shotgun. She despised her brother-in-law.

Aristide's elder son, Philip, hated his father for passing him over as successor to the family business, and for refusing to fund production of a screenplay he wrote for his wife, Magda, a fading theatre actress. Their children (Aristide's grandchildren) are Sophia, Eustace, a cynical rock'n'roll-loving teenager affected by polio, and Josephine, a clever 12-year-old who knows everyone's business.

The younger son, Roger, is managing director of a major family business, but is a failure who has required multiple bailouts. His domineering wife Clemency is a plant biologist with extensive knowledge of poisons.

Laurence Brown, a private tutor, has been having an affair with Brenda. He is spied upon by his pupil Josephine from her tree house hideout.

Charles interviews the family and is met with hostility. All of the family members have motives for the killing: all resented Aristide's bullying and manipulative ways, and are now expecting a sizeable bequest. Most suspect Brenda, as the outsider who had administered the fatal injection. Their suspicions are strengthened when it transpires that Aristide's will was unsigned, resulting in Brenda inheriting his entire estate under the intestacy rules.

Josephine hints that she has found clues, but will not disclose them. The ladder to Josephine's tree house is sabotaged, and she falls and is knocked unconscious. Suspicion switches to Sophia after another, properly signed, will is discovered, leaving the whole estate to her.

Taverner arrives to take over the case; he feels Charles's history with Sophia compromises him. The discovery of love letters between Brenda and Laurence gives Taverner enough evidence to arrest them for Aristide's murder and the attempt on Josephine's life.

Charles, however, remains unconvinced. Josephine is angry that her private notebook has disappeared. Her nanny prepares hot chocolate for her. Josephine refuses the drink, and her nanny dies after drinking it herself. Charles implores Josephine to name the killer. Again, Josephine refuses, even when Charles warns her that she is in danger. Edith is diagnosed with a fatal illness, and is told she has only months to live.

The coroner finds that the nanny had died of cyanide poisoning. Charles suspects Edith, who used cyanide to kill moles. He searches Edith's garden shed and finds a bottle of cyanide, as well as Josephine's missing notebook, buried in quicklime. Edith takes Josephine into the countryside for a drive. She leaves a note confessing to the murders. Charles and Sophia chase them in another car.

As they drive, Sophia reads from Josephine's notebook and discovers the truth: that Josephine had murdered Aristide for having stopped her ballet lessons. She had also staged her fall from the tree house, poisoned the nanny (who had begun to suspect her), and forged Brenda's love letters. Edith had realised that Josephine was the killer and falsely confessed to exonerate Brenda and Laurence, and to spare Josephine a life in psychiatric institutions. As Charles and Sophia catch up, Edith drives off the edge of a quarry, and both she and Josephine are killed.

== Cast ==
- Glenn Close as Lady Edith de Haviland
- Terence Stamp as Chief Inspector Taverner
- Max Irons as Charles Hayward
- Stefanie Martini as Sophia de Haviland
- Julian Sands as Philip Leonides
- Honor Kneafsey as Josephine Leonides
- Christian McKay as Roger Leonides
- Amanda Abbington as Clemency Leonides
- Gillian Anderson as Magda Leonides
- Christina Hendricks as Brenda Leonides
- Roger Ashton-Griffiths as Mr. Gaitskill
- Preston Nyman as Eustace Leonides
- John Heffernan as Mr. Brown
- Jenny Galloway as Nanny
- Jacob Fortune-Lloyd as Brent

== Production ==
In 2011, US filmmaker Neil La Bute announced that he would be directing a feature film version, for 2012, of the novel with a script by Julian Fellowes. On 15 May 2011, Gemma Arterton, Matthew Goode, Gabriel Byrne and Dame Julie Andrews were announced to lead the cast. In a report issued on 10 June 2012, Sony Pictures Worldwide Acquisitions acquired all rights in the US, Canada and internationally for the film, which could help secure it a lucrative release, though the cast and creative team had changed.

Principal photography began in September 2016. Part of the filming was done at King's College London's Maughan Library.

Minley Manor near Fleet, Hampshire, was used as the location for the external shots of Three Gables aka the titular Crooked House. The interiors were shot at four different locations, including Hughenden Manor, West Wycombe House and Tyntesfield, near Bristol. The production designer was Simon Bowles. The film's original score is by Hugo de Chaire.

== Reception ==
On the review aggregator website Rotten Tomatoes, 57% of 30 critics' reviews are positive, with an average rating of 5.2/10. The website's consensus reads: "Agatha Christie fans may find enough intrigue to hold their attention while a capable cast gives their all, but there's no escaping the gaudy pitfalls of this Crooked House." On Metacritic, the film has a weighted average score of 59 out of 100, based on 8 critics, indicating "mixed or average reviews".
