= Prime Suspect 1973 =

2017 detective television series

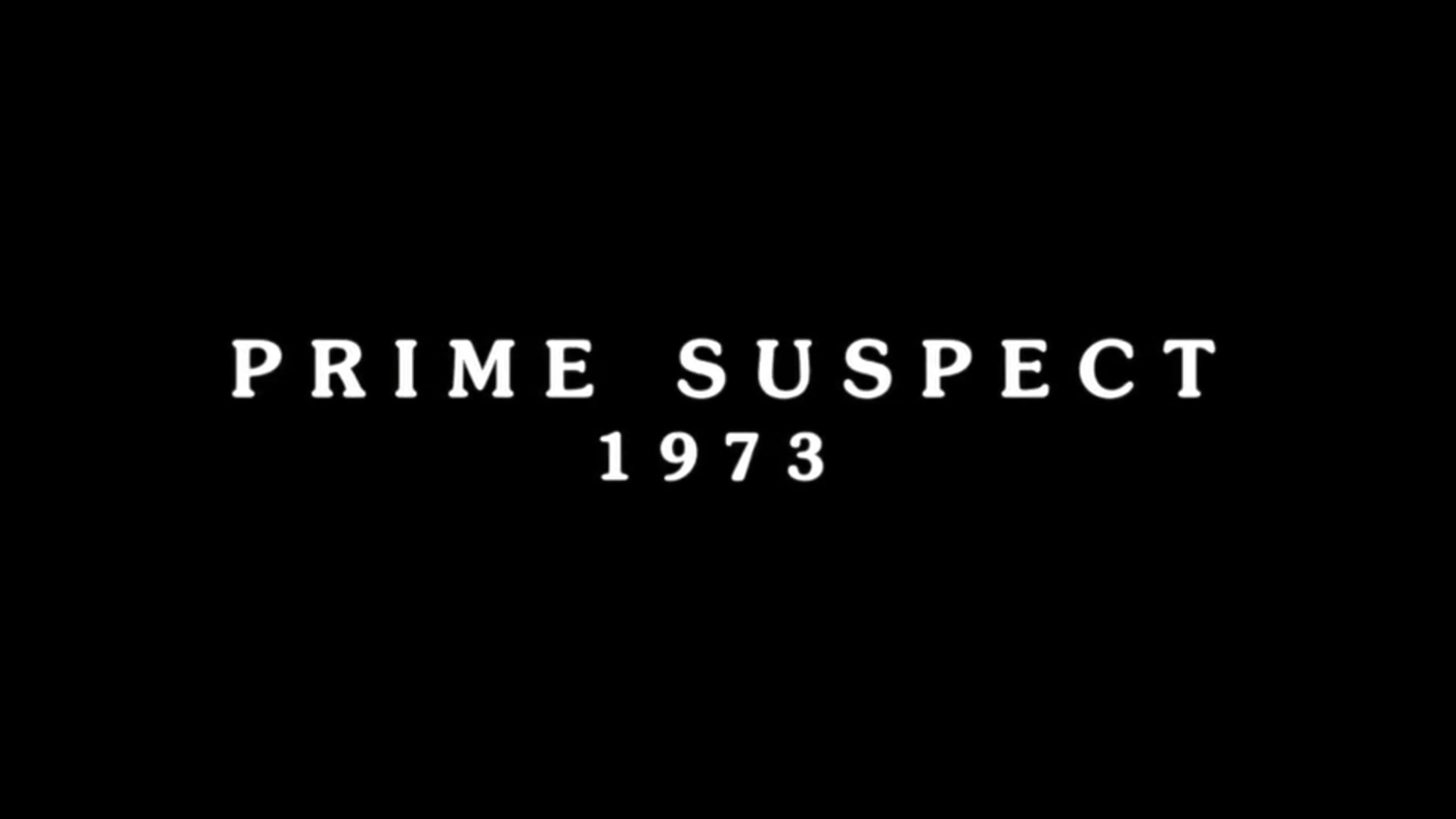
- Also known as: Prime Suspect: Tennison (US)
- Genre: Crime drama
- Based on: Tennison by Lynda La Plante
- Written by: Glen Laker
- Directed by: David Caffrey
- Starring: Stefanie Martini; Sam Reid; Blake Harrison; Alun Armstrong; Ruth Sheen; Jessica Gunning; Andrew Brooke
- Composer: Carly Paradis
- Country of origin: United Kingdom
- Original language: English
- No. of series: 1
- No. of episodes: 6

Production
- Executive producers: Camilla Campbell; Robert Wulff-Cochrane; Rebecca Eaton
- Producer: Rhonda Smith
- Production locations: Hackney, Inner London, England
- Editor: Stuart Gazzard
- Running time: 45 minutes
- Production companies: ITV Studios; Noho Film and Television; Masterpiece

Original release
- Network: ITV
- Release: 2 March – 6 April 2017

Prime Suspect 1973 (also known as Prime Suspect: Tennison) is a British television detective drama series starring Stefanie Martini as the young Jane Tennison. It is a prequel to the long-running Prime Suspect series that had starred Helen Mirren.

The series debuted on ITV in the UK on 2 March 2017, comprising six episodes. On 21 June 2017, it was confirmed there would be no second series.

== Synopsis ==
Set in Hackney, the series depicts 22-year-old Jane Tennison (Stefanie Martini) as she begins her career as a woman police constable (WPC) in 1973 with the Metropolitan Police Service. At a time when women were beginning to be gradually integrated into the police force, Tennison has to deal with sexism, as well as difficulties in her home life, as her family disapprove of her career choice.

Under the guidance of DI Len Bradfield (Sam Reid), the naive and inexperienced Tennison assists in investigating the murder of a young runaway, Julie-Ann Collins. Meanwhile, criminal Clifford Bentley (Alun Armstrong) is released from prison and, along with other members of his family, is planning a bank heist. Links to Collins's murder threaten to expose the Bentley family's plans.

== Cast ==
=== Main cast ===
- Stefanie Martini as WPC Jane Tennison
- Sam Reid as DI Len Bradfield
- Blake Harrison as DS Spencer Gibbs
- Alun Armstrong as Clifford Bentley
- Ruth Sheen as Renee Bentley
- Jessica Gunning as WPC Kath Morgan
- Andrew Brooke as Sergeant Jim Harris

=== Supporting cast ===
- Nick Sidi as Andrew Tennison
- Geraldine Somerville as Joyce Tennison
- Geoffrey Streatfeild as George Collins
- Nancy Carroll as Mary Collins
- Rosie Day as Pam Tennison
- Lex Shrapnel as John Bentley
- Jay Taylor as David Bentley
- Jacob James Beswick as Eddie Philips
- Joshua Hill as DC Edwards
- Daniel Ezra as DC Ashton
- Anthony Skordi as Silas Manatos
- Tommy McDonnell as DC Hudson
- Jordan Long as DS Lawrence

== Episodes ==
| No. | Title | Directed by | Written by | Original release date | UK viewers (millions) |
|---|---|---|---|---|---|
| 1 | "Episode 1" | David Caffrey | Glen Laker | 2 March 2017 | 7.64 |
A young prostitute, Julie-Ann Collins, is found murdered in an underpass on a busy London estate. New recruit WPC Jane Tennison is drawn into the investigation, led by DI Len Bradfield, as the search for Julie-Ann's killer gets underway. Suspicion initially falls on her boyfriend, Eddie Phillips, who has no alibi for the time of the murder. Meanwhile, career criminal Clifford Bentley is planning a bank robbery from within prison, with help from his sons, John and David.
| 2 | "Episode 2" | David Caffrey | Glen Laker | 9 March 2017 | 6.64 |
The search for Julie-Ann's killer continues, as the team try to track her movements from the day she left hospital until the day she was found dead. Tennison uncovers a vital clue which suggests that despite her parents' claims that they had not seen or spoken to Julie-Ann for several months, she contacted them shortly before she was murdered. Tennison also finds the vehicle matching an eye-witness description in the Collins' garage.
| 3 | "Episode 3" | David Caffrey | Glen Laker | 16 March 2017 | 5.90 |
Evidence discovered in the basement of the Collins' house suggests that Julie-Ann was beaten by one of her parents. The search for the mysterious 'Oz' continues, until Tennison's perseverance results in a major breakthrough. Meanwhile, Clifford Bentley is out of jail and determined to carry out his final heist. Bradfield, however, warns him that he is keeping a close eye. The brewing sexual spark between Tennison and Bradfield becomes talk of the station.
| 4 | "Episode 4" | David Caffrey | Glen Laker | 23 March 2017 | 6.02 |
Following the arrest of the mysterious 'Oz', the investigation takes an unexpected twist. The Bentleys' plans are nearly blown out of the water by a visit from the police. Tennison gets a new lead that could bring the Bentleys into the murder investigation.
| 5 | "Episode 5" | David Caffrey | Glen Laker | 30 March 2017 | 5.62 |
Tennison plays the radio recordings to Bradfield who, sensing a chance to get his revenge on Clifford, diverts the team to carry out surveillance of the Bentleys, despite orders from his superior officer to stay focused on the murder case.
| 6 | "Episode 6" | David Caffrey | Glen Laker | 6 April 2017 | 5.72 |
In the aftermath of the explosion at the bank vault, the police operation descends into pandemonium and panic. As Tennison arrives at the scene, she is met with the news that Bradfield is dead from the explosion. At a search of the Bentley lock-up, Tennison uncovers evidence that it was where Julie-Ann was killed. The Bentleys' van is searched and a small silk bow is discovered which matches Julie-Ann’s bra. The police manhunt ramps up, with David Bentley now as their prime suspect. Tennison gets to the truth of what really happened.

== Production ==
=== Development ===
The series is produced for ITV by Noho Film and Television, and was adapted by Glen Laker from the novel Tennison, written by original series creator Lynda La Plante. Commissioned by ITV in June 2015 under the working title Tennison, the series was set to be penned by LaPlante, who had also written the original Prime Suspect novels, and contributed to episodes of the long-running television series of the same name.

The announcement of Martini as Jane Tennison, as well as further casting was announced in July 2016. In early 2016, La Plante pulled out of the project. Vera and Home Fires writer Glen Laker was drafted in to write the series.

=== Filming ===
Filming began in July 2016 in London.

=== Cancellation ===
In June 2017, ITV confirmed that the series had not been recommissioned, despite high ratings for the first series. The cause is reported to be creative differences between author Lynda LaPlante and ITV.

== Broadcast ==
Prime Suspect 1973 first aired on 2 March 2017 on ITV. Internationally, broadcast under the title Prime Suspect: Tennison, the series premiered in South Africa on 6 April 2017 on ITV Choice. The series premiered in the United States on 25 June 2017 on Masterpiece Mystery on PBS, airing over three 90-minute instalments.

== Reception ==
The series received mixed reviews from critics, achieving a 50% approval rating based on 12 reviews as aggregated on Rotten Tomatoes. Critics praised Stefanie Martini's performance and the period detail, in particular. Upon its broadcast in the United States, the Washington Post recommended it as "one of the best shows you’ll find on TV this summer", while the Los Angeles Times said that "Tennison does not quite measure up to Prime Suspect." In contrast, Salon considered it fortunate that the series was forced into early retirement, and noted that this Tennison prequel failed to focus on Tennison's character development with the same intensity as the "provocative... classic" original did with Helen Mirren's character.
