= Jean-Jacques Hauer =

German painter (1751–1829)

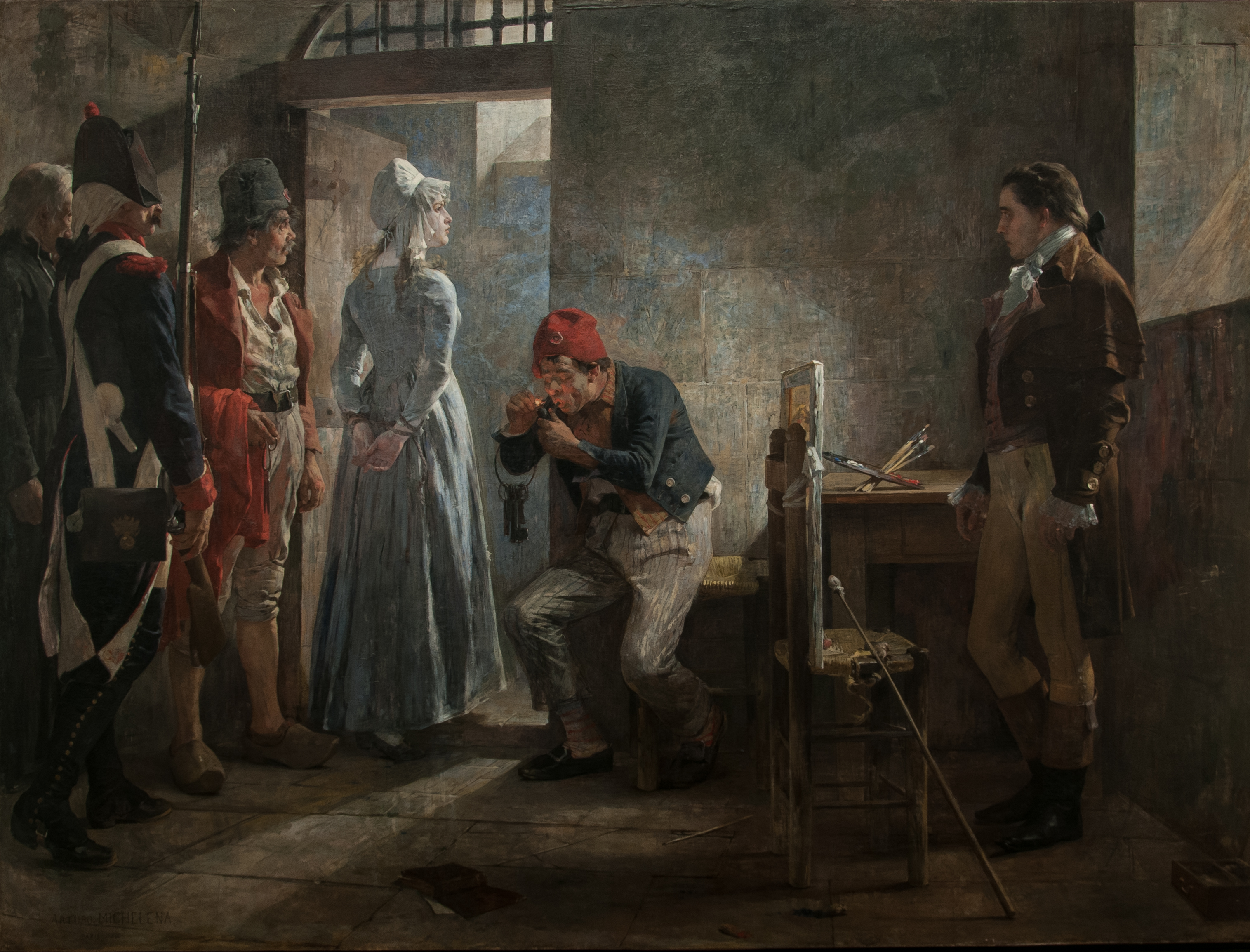
- Charlotte Corday being conducted to her execution. By Arturo Michelena, 1889. The painter Hauer stands at the right
- Born: 10 March 1751; Gau-Algesheim, Electorate of Mainz
- Died: 3 June 1829 (aged 78); Blois, France
- Notable work: Portrait of Charlotte Corday

Jean-Jacques Hauer or Johann Jakob Hauer (10 March 1751 – 3 June 1829) was a German painter active in France. Hauer is known to have painted the portrait of Charlotte Corday before her execution.

The artist who drafted the portrait of Charlotte Corday in the tribunal was M. Hauer, painter and National Guard officer for the Theatre Francais. [B]ack in her cell, she asked the janitor to [let] him ... enter to finish his work. M. Hauer was let in. Charlotte thanked him [for] the interest he took [in] her fate and posed [for] him with serenity

— Lamartine

== Selected works ==
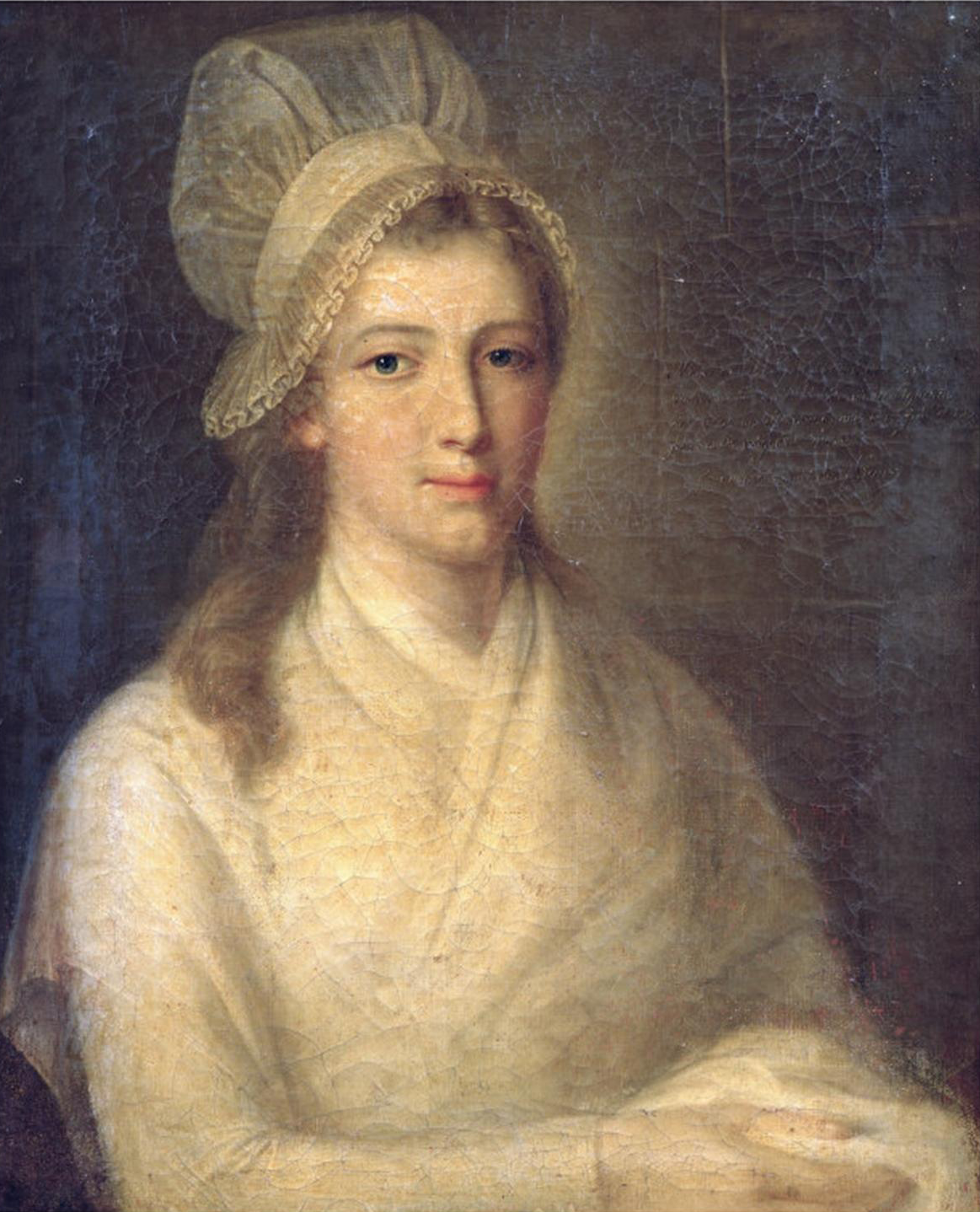
Portrait of Charlotte Corday

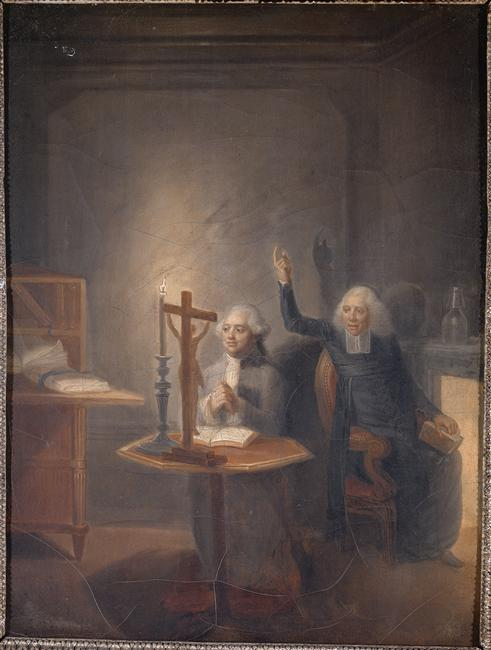
La confession de Louis XVI par l'abbé Edgeworth

- Oil painting, ex-voto, Blois, Blois Cathedral.
- Oil painting, Portrait du préfet du Loir-et-Cher Louis Chicoilet de Corbigny, 1829, Blois, Château de Blois
- Pastel, Charlotte Corday, 17 July 1793, Versailles, musée Lambinet
- Oil painting, Charlotte Corday, 1793, Versailles, musée Lambinet
- Oil painting, La mort de Marat, 1794, Versailles, musée Lambinet.
- Oil painting, La confession de Louis XVI par l'abbé Edgeworth, Versailles, musée Lambinet
- Oil painting, Les adieux de Louis XVI à sa famille, 20 January 1793, Paris, Carnavalet Museum
