= The Killing Kind (TV series) =

British Television series

- Based on: The Killing Kind by Jane Casey
- Screenplay by: Zara Hayes; Jonathan A.H. Stewart
- Starring: Emma Appleton; Colin Morgan; Elliot Barnes-Worrell; Olivia D'Lima; Kerr Logan; Sara Powell; Nicholas Rowe; Sophie Stanton
- Country of origin: United Kingdom
- Original language: English
- No. of series: 1
- No. of episodes: 6

Production
- Executive producers: Jane Casey; Paula Cuddy; Jill Green; Eve Gutierrez; Zara Hayes; Jonathan A.H. Stewart
- Running time: 44–48 minutes
- Production companies: Eleventh Hour Films; Sony Pictures Television

Original release
- Network: Paramount+
- Release: 7 September 2023

The Killing Kind is a British legal thriller television series based on the novel of the same name by Jane Casey, adapted by Jonathan H. A. Stewart and Zara Hayes and developed by Eleventh Hour Films for Paramount+. The series premiered on 7 September 2023.

== Synopsis ==
Ingrid (Appleton) is a barrister trying to rebuild her life after getting too close to a dangerous former client (Morgan), when suddenly he reappears in her life.

== Cast ==
=== Main ===
- Emma Appleton as Ingrid Lewis
- Colin Morgan as John Webster
- Elliot Barnes-Worrell as Mark Orpen
- Olivia D'Lima as Suzanne
- Kerr Logan as DS Luke Nash
- Sara Powell as Belinda Grey
- Nicholas Rowe as Angus Grey
- Sophie Stanton as DI Jill Winstanley

=== Recurring ===
- Rob Jarvis as Tom Martins
- Bethany Muir as Emma Seaton
- Richard Dixon as Judge Peter Stuart
- Charles Furness as Jake Seaton
- Stuart Fox as Daniel Pole
- Niamh Gaia as Flora Pole

== Episodes ==
No.	Title	Directed by	Written by	Original release date
1	"Episode 1"	Zara Hayes	Zara Hayes and Jonathan Stewart	7 September 2023
2	"Episode 2"	Zara Hayes	Zara Hayes and Jonathan Stewart	7 September 2023
3	"Episode 3"	Zara Hayes	Zara Hayes and Jonathan Stewart	7 September 2023
4	"Episode 4"	Chanya Button	Zara Hayes and Jonathan Stewart	7 September 2023
5	"Episode 5"	Chanya Button	Zara Hayes and Jonathan Stewart	7 September 2023
6	"Episode 6"	Chanya Button	Zara Hayes and Jonathan Stewart	7 September 2023

== Production ==
Eleventh Hour Films optioned the rights to adapt Jane Casey's book The Killing Kind in May 2021, the same month the book was released. It was announced in December 2022 that Paramount+ had greenlit the six-part adaptation of Casey's novel with Sony Pictures Television attached as a distributor. Casey was to be involved in the adaptation with Eleventh Hour Films, director Zara Hayes and co-screenplay writer Jonathan A.H. Stewart. Casey herself would executive produce the series with Paula Cuddy, Jill Green and Eva Gutierrez, with Andy Litvin as producer.

=== Casting ===
The cast were announced at the end of January 2023, with Colin Morgan and Emma Appleton set to lead the series. Also joining the cast were Elliot Barnes-Worrell, Rob Jarvis, and Kerr Logan.

=== Filming ===
Principal photography began at The Bottle Yard Studios in Bristol and on location in and around Bristol, with filming locations including the College Green, Avon Street, and outside Bristol Cathedral. Filming also took place in Kingsdown and Bedminster, Bristol. In February 2023, location shooting took place on the seafront at Brean in Somerset. Filming also taking place in March in and around the Westgate Hotel in Newport. Filming is also scheduled for London. Filming was also taking place on Clevedon pier on the 6th April 2023.

== Release ==
Initially expected to stream on Paramount+ in 2024, the series was moved up to be released on 7 September 2023.

ITV made the series available for streaming on its ITVX service on 12 September 2024, as well as airing it on ITV1 from 14 September to 12 October.
