= Stefanie Martini =

British actress (born 1990)

- Born: Stefanie Louise Martini; 6 October 1990 (age 36); Bristol, England
- Education: Churchill Academy and Sixth Form (2002–2009)
- Alma mater: Made in Bristol programme; Royal Academy of Dramatic Art (RADA)
- Occupation: Actress
- Years active: 2016–present

Stefanie Martini (born 6 October 1990) is an English actress, known for her leading role in ITV's 2017 production Prime Suspect 1973. She also starred in Doctor Thorne (2016), Emerald City (2017), the 2017 film Crooked House, and the TV series The Last Kingdom.

== Early life and education ==
Born in Bristol, Martini was raised in villages in North Somerset by her parents. She completed her secondary education locally. Martini starred in local youth plays with Winscombe Youth Theatre. She studied for her A-levels at Churchill Academy and Sixth Form. She undertook a two-week induction at the National Youth Theatre, with an interest in illustration before beginning an arts foundation course. However, a teacher suggested that, if she was interested in acting, she should try it.

After failing to get into RADA (The Royal Academy of Dramatic Art) on her first attempt, Martini joined a one-year programme at the Bristol Old Vic Theatre School, where the company wrote their own plays that they produced in local schools. She was accepted into RADA the following year.

== Career ==
During Martini's third year at RADA, she played the supporting role of a suspect in an episode of the TV series Endeavour. In 2016, she starred as Mary Thorne in Doctor Thorne, and Princess Langwidere in NBC's Emerald City. Martini portrayed the lead role of Jane Tennison in ITV's 2017 production Prime Suspect 1973, a prequel to the TV series Prime Suspect which had starred Helen Mirren. She also played Sophia de Haviland in the 2017 film Crooked House, an adaptation of the Agatha Christie novel of the same name.

From 2020 to 2022, Martini portrayed Eadith in the Netflix series The Last Kingdom for seasons four and five. She starred in the World War II science fiction drama Lola, released in August 2022.

== Personal life ==
On 26 June 2021, Martini came out as bisexual in an Instagram post. Since late 2021, Martini has been in a relationship with English intimacy coordinator and model El Wood, which she announced publicly on social media on 1 January 2022.

== Filmography ==
=== Film ===
	Title	Role	Notes
2017	Crooked House	Sophia de Haviland	Main role
2018	Tracks	Dilly	Short film
2018	Hurricane (Mission of Honor in the U.S.)	Phyllis Lambert	Main role
2019	Make Up	Jade	Main role
2022	LOLA	Martha Hanbury	Main role
2026	Christmas & Chaos	TBA	Post-production
TBA	The Experiment	Kara Stone	Post-production

=== Television ===
Year	Title	Role	Notes
2016	Endeavour	Georgina Mortmaigne	Episode: "Prey"
2016	Doctor Thorne	Mary Thorne	Main role
2016	Emerald City	Princess Langwidere	Recurring role
2017	Prime Suspect 1973	Jane Tennison	Main role
2020–2022	The Last Kingdom	Eadith	Main role; seasons 4–5
2023	The Gold	Marnie Palmer	6-part drama
2025–present	Maigret	Madame Louise Maigret	Main role; 6 episodes

=== Stage ===
Year	Title	Roles	Notes
2022	Patriots	Marina Litvinenko/Nina Berezovsky	Noël Coward Theatre
2025	Private View	Unnamed	Soho Theatre

== Video games ==
Year	Title	Role	Notes
2024	Elden Ring Shadow of the Erdtree	Redmane Freyja	

== Awards and nominations ==
Year	Award	Category	Work	Result	Ref
2018	International Achievement Recognition Awards (IARA)	Best Young Actress	Prime Suspect 1973	Nominated	
