= Crooked House =

1949 mystery novel by Agatha Christie

- Dust-jacket illustration of the UK first edition.
- Author: Agatha Christie
- Language: English
- Genre: Crime novel
- Publisher: Dodd, Mead and Company
- Publication date: March 1949
- Publication place: United Kingdom
- Media type: Print (hardback & paperback)
- Pages: 211 pp (first edition, hardback)
- ISBN: 978-0-00-713686-5
- Preceded by: The Rose and the Yew Tree
- Followed by: A Murder Is Announced

Crooked House is a mystery novel by Agatha Christie first published in the US by Dodd, Mead and Company in March 1949 and in the UK by the Collins Crime Club on 23 May of the same year.

The action takes place in and near London in the autumn of 1947. Christie said the titles of this novel and Ordeal by Innocence were her favourites amongst her own works.

== Title meaning ==
The title refers to a nursery rhyme ("There Was a Crooked Man"), a common theme of the author. Narrator Charles's fiancée Sophia says it refers not to dishonesty, but rather "we hadn't been able to grow up independent... twisted and twining", meaning unhealthily interdependent on the intensely strong personality of the family patriarch, Aristide Leonides.

== Plot introduction ==
Three generations of the Leonides family live together under wealthy patriarch Aristide. His first wife Marcia died; her sister Edith has cared for the household since then. His second wife is the indolent Brenda, decades his junior, suspected of having a clandestine love affair with Laurence, the grandchildren's tutor. After Aristide is poisoned by his own eye medicine (eserine), his granddaughter Sophia tells narrator and fiancé Charles Hayward that they cannot marry until the killer is apprehended. Charles's father, "The Old Man", is Assistant Commissioner of Scotland Yard, so Charles investigates from the inside along with assigned detective Chief Inspector Taverner.

== Plot summary ==
Towards the end of the Second World War, Charles Hayward is in Cairo and falls in love with Sophia Leonides, a clever, successful Englishwoman who works for the Foreign Office. They put off getting engaged until the end of the war when they will be reunited in England.

Hayward returns home and reads a death notice in The Times: Sophia's grandfather, the wealthy entrepreneur Aristide Leonides, has died, aged 87. Due to the war, the whole family has been living with him in a sumptuous but ill-proportioned house called "Three Gables", the crooked house of the title. The autopsy reveals that Leonides was poisoned with his own eserine-based eye medicine via an insulin injection. Sophia tells Charles that she can't marry him until the matter is cleared up.

The obvious suspects are Brenda Leonides, Aristide's much younger second wife, and Laurence Brown, a conscientious objector who has been living in the house as private tutor to Sophia's younger brother and sister, Eustace and Josephine. They are rumoured to have been carrying on an illicit love affair under old Leonides's nose. The family members hope these two prove to be the murderers because they despise Brenda as a gold digger and also hope to escape the scandal that a different outcome would bring. Charles agrees to help his father, an assistant commissioner of Scotland Yard, to investigate the crime. He becomes a house guest at Three Gables, hoping that someone might reveal a clue at an unguarded moment.

All the family members had motive and opportunity, none has an alibi; and each of them knew that Aristide's eye medicine was poisonous as he had told all the family after being asked by Josephine. According to the will, they all stand to gain a healthy bequest from the old man's estate. The servants do not get bequests but would lose their (increasing) annual wages or bonuses, so are not suspects. Aside from this, the family members have little in common. Edith de Haviland, Aristide's unmarried sister-in-law, is a brusque woman in her 70s who came to stay with him after his first wife's death to supervise his children's upbringing. Roger, the eldest son and Aristide's favourite, is a failure as a businessman. He has steered the catering business bestowed to him by his father to the brink of bankruptcy and he longs to live a simple life somewhere far away. Roger's wife Clemency, a scientist with austere and unsentimental tastes, has never been able to enjoy the wealth offered by her husband's family. Roger's younger brother, Philip, has suffered under his father's preference for Roger, and retreated into a distant world of books and bygone historical epochs, spending all his waking hours in the library. Philip's wife Magda is an only moderately successful actress to whom everything, even a family murder, is a stage show in which she wants to play a leading part. Sixteen-year-old Eustace has polio. He is handsome and intelligent, yet embittered by his disability. His twelve-year-old sister Josephine, on the other hand, is ugly, precociously intelligent, and obsessed with detective stories. She spies continually on the rest of the household, letting everyone know that she is writing down her observations in a secret notebook.

Leonides had secretly personally rewritten (to the surprise of his lawyer Mr Gaitskill) his will to leave everything to Philip's daughter Sophia. He believed that she alone had the strength of character to assume his place as the head of the family. Josephine, who had been bragging that she knows the killer's identity, is found lying unconscious in the yard from a blow to the head from a marble doorstop. Charles discovers a cache of incriminating love letters from Brenda to Laurence, and the two are arrested. While they are in custody, the children's nanny dies after drinking a digitalis-laced cup of cocoa that had apparently been intended for Josephine. The family realises that the killer is still among them.

Charles, afraid for Josephine's life, tries in vain to induce her to disclose the murderer's name. Edith de Haviland invites Josephine to come out with her in the car for an ice cream soda. The car drives over a cliff and both are killed. Back at Three Gables, Charles finds two letters from Miss de Haviland. One is a suicide note for Chief Inspector Taverner taking responsibility, although not explicitly confessing, to the murders of Aristide and Nanny. The second letter, intended for Sophia and Charles only, reveals the truth of the matter: Josephine was the murderer. As proof, de Haviland has enclosed the child's secret notebook, the first line of which reads "Today I killed grandfather."

Josephine killed her grandfather because he wouldn't pay for her ballet lessons; she then revelled in all the attention she received afterwards and planned her own assault with the marble doorstop as a way of diverting attention. She poisoned Nanny for encouraging Magda to send her to Switzerland, and also because Nanny called her a "silly little girl". She also included threats against Magda if her mother seriously considered sending her away. Miss de Haviland had discovered Josephine's notebook hidden in a dog kennel, and committed the murder-suicide car crash as she did not want Josephine to suffer in a prison or asylum if and when the police learned she was the murderer.

== Characters ==
- Charles Hayward, fiancé to Sophia Leonides, narrator
- Sophia Leonides, daughter of Magda and Philip Leonides, granddaughter of Aristide
- Brenda Leonides, spoiled much younger widow of Aristide Leonides, married at 24 and now aged 34 years
- Magda West, a flamboyant stage actress
- Edith de Haviland, Sophia's elderly spinster great-aunt, sister of Aristide Leonides' first wife, Marcia de Haviland
- Roger Leonides, son of Aristide Leonides
- Clemency Leonides, his wife, a scientist
- Philip Leonides, Magda's husband and Roger's brother
- Laurence Brown, tutor to Josephine and Eustace; in love with Brenda. Aged about 30
- Josephine Leonides, Magda's 12-year-old daughter
- Eustace Leonides, Magda's 16-year-old son; brother of Sophia and Josephine
- Janet Rowe, nanny to the Leonides children
- Chief Inspector Taverner, Scotland Yard inspector assigned
- "The Old Man", Sir Arthur Hayward, Assistant Commissioner of Scotland Yard, father of Charles Hayward
- Aristide Leonides, the man who was murdered; born in Smyrna, Turkey, he arrived in London in 1884 when he was 24
- Mr Gaitskill, his family (but not always business) solicitor for 43½ years

== Reception ==
Maurice Richardson, in the 29 May 1949 issue of The Observer, gave a positive review in comparison to his opinion of Taken at the Flood the previous year: "Her forty-ninth book and one of her best seven. Poisoning of aged iniquitous anglicised Levantine millionaire. Nicely characterised family of suspects. Delicious red herrings. Infinite suspense and shocking surprise finish make up for slight looseness of texture."

An unnamed reviewer in the Toronto Daily Star of 12 March 1949 wrote: "Chief Inspector Taverner of Scotland Yard was as brilliant as usual but barking up the wrong tree – as Agatha Christie demonstrates in a surprise ending which introduces a novel idea in murder mystery."

Robert Barnard: "'Pure pleasure' was how the author described the writing of this, which was long planned, and remained one of her favourites. As the title implies, this is a family murder – and a very odd family indeed. The solution, one of the classic ones, was anticipated (but much less effectively) in Margery Allingham's 'prentice work The White Cottage Mystery."

In the "Binge!" article of Entertainment Weekly Issue #1343-44 (26 December 2014–3 January 2015), the writers picked Crooked House as an "EW favorite" on the list of the "Nine Great Christie Novels".

== Film, TV or theatrical adaptations ==
The novel was adapted for BBC Radio 4 in four weekly 30-minute episodes which began broadcasting on 29 February 2008. It starred Rory Kinnear (Charles Hayward), Anna Maxwell Martin (Sophia Leonides), and Phil Davis (Chief Insp. Taverner). The radio play was dramatised by Joy Wilkinson and directed by Sam Hoyle. It was subsequently issued on CD. This version removed the character of Eustace.

In 2011, US filmmaker Neil LaBute announced that he would be directing a feature film version, for 2012, of the novel with a script by Julian Fellowes. On 15 May 2011, Gemma Arterton, Matthew Goode, Gabriel Byrne and Dame Julie Andrews were announced to lead the cast. In a report issued on 10 June 2012, Sony Pictures Worldwide Acquisitions acquired all rights in the US, Canada and internationally for the film, which could help secure it a lucrative release, though the cast and creative team had changed.

The film, directed by Gilles Paquet-Brenner and starring Christina Hendricks, Gillian Anderson, Max Irons, Glenn Close, Julian Sands, Terence Stamp, Stefanie Martini and Christian McKay, was released digitally on 21 November 2017 and first broadcast on Channel 5 on 17 December 2017. On 22 December 2017, it received a modest (16 theatres) theatrical release in the U.S. via Vertical Entertainment.

== Publication history ==
- 1949, Dodd Mead and Company (New York), March 1949, Hardback, 211 pp
- 1949, Collins Crime Club (London), 23 May 1949, Hardback, 192 pp
- 1951, Pocket Books (New York), Paperback, (Pocket #753), 200 pp
- 1953, Penguin Books, Paperback, (Penguin #925), 191 pp
- 1959, Fontana Books (Imprint of HarperCollins), Paperback, 191 pp
- 1967, Greenway collected works (William Collins), Hardcover, 223 pp
- 1967, Greenway collected works (Dodd Mead), Hardcover, 223 pp
- 1978 Omniprose collected works with Passenger to Frankfurt, Hardcover, 472 pp, ISBN 0921111096
- 1991, Ulverscroft Large-print Edition, Hardcover, ISBN 0-7089-2419-0

A condensed version of the novel was first published in the US in Cosmopolitan magazine in the issue for October 1948 (Volume 125, Number 4) with an illustration by Grushkin.

In the UK the novel was first serialised in the weekly magazine John Bull in seven abridged instalments from 23 April (Volume 85, Number 2234) to 4 June 1949 (Volume 85, Number 2240) with illustrations by Alfred Sindall.
