= Jane Casey =

Irish crime novelist

Jane Casey is an Irish-born author of crime novels. She was born in Dublin in 1977 and grew up in Castleknock, 8 km (5 mi) west of the centre of Dublin. She studied English at Jesus College, Oxford. For a period she worked as an editor for a children's book publisher.

Her first book, The Missing, was published by Ebury Press in February 2010. It was shortlisted for the Ireland AM Crime Fiction Award. She then began a series of novels featuring Detective Constable Maeve Kerrigan: The Burning, The Reckoning, The Last Girl, The Stranger You Know and The Kill (which was shortlisted for the Ireland AM Crime Fiction Award 2014).

In 2023, a television adaptation of Casey's standalone novel The Killing Kind was released by Paramount+.

Her 2024 novel A Stranger in the Family won the Crime Fiction Book of the Year at the Irish Book Awards.

She has also begun a series of novels for young adults, featuring her character Jess Tennant: How to Fall, Bet Your Life and Hide and Seek.

== Personal life ==
Casey is a cousin of broadcaster Pat Kenny. She lives in London with her two sons and husband.

== Publications ==
=== Standalone Novels ===
- Casey, Jane (February 2010). The Missing. Ebury Press. ISBN 978-0091935993.
- Casey, Jane (May 2021). The Killing Kind. HarperCollins. ISBN 978-0008404925.

=== Jess Tennant series ===
- Casey, Jane (January 2013). How To Fall. Ebury Press. ISBN 978-0552566032.
- Casey, Jane (February 2014). Bet Your Life. Corgi Childrens. ISBN 978-0552566049.
- Casey, Jane (August 2015). Hide and Seek. Griffin St. Martin's. ISBN 9781250040671.

=== Maeve Kerrigan series ===
- Casey, Jane (November 2010). The Burning. Ebury Press. ISBN 978-0091936006.
- Casey, Jane (July 2011). The Reckoning. Ebury Press. ISBN 978-0091941208.
- Casey, Jane (May 2012). The Last Girl. Ebury Press. ISBN 978-0091941215.
- Casey, Jane (July 2013). Left For Dead. Ebury Press. ISBN 9781448177974. short story
- Casey, Jane (July 2013). The Stranger You Know. Ebury Press. ISBN 978-0091948368.
- Casey, Jane (June 2014). The Kill. Ebury Press. ISBN 978-0091949686.
- Casey, Jane (June 2015). After the Fire. Ebury Press. ISBN 978-0091949693.
- Casey, Jane (March 2017). Let The Dead Speak. Harper Collins. ISBN 978-0008148980.
- Casey, Jane (February 2019). One in Custody. Harper Collins. ISBN 9780008275037. short story
- Casey, Jane (April 2019). Cruel Acts. Harper Collins. ISBN 9780008149031.
- Casey, Jane (June 2019). Love Lies Bleeding. Harper Collins. ISBN 9780008149147. short story
- Casey, Jane (April 2020). The Cutting Place. Harper Collins. ISBN 9780008149086.
- Casey, Jane (August 2020). Silent Kill. Harper Collins. ISBN 9780008149154. short story
- Casey, Jane (March 2023). The Close. Harper Collins. ISBN 9780008404970.
- Casey, Jane (March 2024). A Stranger in the Family. Harper Collins. ISBN 9780008405021.
- Casey, Jane (April 2025). The Secret Room. Harper Collins. ISBN 9780008702298.
