= List of 2005 films based on actual events =

This is a list of films and miniseries that are based on actual events. All films on this list are from American production unless indicated otherwise.

== 2005 ==
- 1 Litre of Tears (Japanese: 1リットルの涙) (2005) – Japanese medical drama miniseries based on the story of Aya Kitō, who suffered from a degenerative disease and died at the age of 25
- The 9th Company (Russian: 9 рота) (2005) – Russian war film loosely based on a real-life battle that took place at Hill 3234 in early 1988, during Operation Magistral, the last large-scale Soviet military operation in Afghanistan
- 14 Hours (2005) – medical drama television film based on true-life events surrounding Tropical Storm Allison in 2001
- The Adventures of Greyfriars Bobby (2005) – British family adventure film loosely based on a real dog known as Greyfriars Bobby
- Ambulance Girl (2005) – medical drama television film based on the memoir by Jane Stern, Ambulance Girl: How I Saved Myself by Becoming an EMT
- An American Haunting (2005) – British-Canadian-Romanian-American supernatural horror film based on the legend of the Bell Witch
- Aurore (2005) – Canadian French-language biographical drama film based on the true story of Aurore Gagnon, one of Quebec's best-known victims of child abuse
- Bhagmati (Hindi: भैगमाती) (2005) – Indian Hindi-language biographical film based on the love story between Prince Mohammad Quli Qutb Shah of Hyderabad and Bhagmati
- Blue Swallow (Korean: 청연) (2005) – South Korean biographical adventure film based on the true story of Park Kyung-won, an early Korean female pilot
- Cafundó (2005) – Brazilian historical drama film based on miracle worker preto velho João de Camargo of Sorocaba
- Camarón: When Flamenco Became Legend (Spanish: Camarón: la película) (2005) – Spanish biographical drama film portraying a fictionalised version of the life of flamenco singer José Monge Cruz, aka "Camarón de la Isla", depicting his artistic rise and early physical decline
- Capote (2005) – biographical drama film about American novelist Truman Capote
- Casanova (2005) – British comedy drama miniseries telling the story of the life of 18th century Italian adventurer Giacomo Casanova, based on his own twelve-volume memoirs
- Casanova (2005) – romantic drama film loosely based on the life of Giacomo Casanova
- Cinderella Man (2005) – biographical sport drama film telling the story of heavyweight boxing champion James J. Braddock, who was dubbed "The Cinderella Man" by journalist Damon Runyon
- Coach Carter (2005) – biographical sport drama film based on the true story of Richmond High School basketball coach Ken Carter, who made headlines in 1999 for suspending his undefeated high school basketball team due to poor academic results
- Code Breakers (2005) – sport drama television film chronicling the real-life 1951 cheating scandal at the United States Military Academy, and the impact on its football team
- Colour Me Kubrick (2005) – British-French comedy drama film about Alan Conway, a British con-man who had been impersonating director Stanley Kubrick since the early 1990s - drawing its inspiration from actual events
- Dalida (2005) – French-Italian biographical drama miniseries about the life of Italian-French singer and actress Dalida
- Dark Night: October 17, 1961 (French: Nuit noire 17 octobre 1961) (2005) – French historical television film about the Paris massacre of 1961
- David & Layla (2005) – romantic comedy drama film inspired by a true story about a Jewish man and a Muslim woman who fall in love in New York City
- Dawn Anna (2005) – drama television film based upon real events surrounding the Columbine High School massacre
- Deadly Soma (Kannada: ಮಾರಣಾಂತಿಕ ಸೋಮ) (2005) – Indian Kannada-language biographical crime film based on the real life incidents of an infamous underworld don, Deadly Soma
- Destined for Blues (Polish: Skazany na bluesa) (2005) – Polish biographical film depicting the story of Ryszard "Rysiek" Riedel, leader of Polish blues rock band Dżem
- Devaki (Hindi: देवकी) (2005) – Indian Hindi-language drama film derived from a real-life incident where a tribal woman named Devakibai was sold in an open auction in Pandhana, a sub-division of Khandwa district in Madhya Pradesh, in January 2003
- Domino (2005) – French-American-British action crime film inspired by Domino Harvey, the English daughter of stage and screen actor Laurence Harvey, who became a Los Angeles bounty hunter
- Dr. B. R. Ambedkar (Kannada: ಡಾ.ಬಿ.ಆರ್.ಅಂಬೇಡ್ಕರ್) (2005) – Indian Kannada-language biographical film based on the life of Indian social reformer, jurist, academic-politician, B. R. Ambedkar
- Dreamer (2005) – sport drama film inspired by the true story of an injured Thoroughbred racehorse named Mariah's Storm
- Duma (2005) – American-South African-Batswana-Namibian family adventure film telling the true story of the young boy's friendship with an orphaned cheetah on the family's game ranch in Kenya
- Dynasty: The Making of a Guilty Pleasure (2005) – biographical drama television film based on the creation and behind the scenes production of the 1980s prime time soap opera Dynasty
- Efunsetan Aniwura (2005) – Nigerian historical drama film covering the life of Yoruba heroine, Efunsetan Aniwura
- Egypt (2005) – British historical drama miniseries portraying events in the history of Egyptology from the 18th through early 20th centuries
- Elizabeth I (2005) – British-American historical drama miniseries covering the last 24 years of Elizabeth I of England's nearly 45-year reign, focusing on the final years of her relationship with the Earl of Leicester and her subsequent relationship with the Earl of Essex
- Elvis (2005) – biographical drama miniseries chronicling the rise of American music icon Elvis Presley from his high school years to his international superstardom
- Empire (2005) – American-Canadian historical miniseries set in 44 BC Rome and covering the struggle of a young Octavius, the nephew and heir of Julius Caesar, to become the first emperor of Rome
- End of the Spear (2005) – biographical adventure drama film recounting the story of Operation Auca, in which five American Christian missionaries attempted to evangelize the Waodani people of the tropical rain forest of Eastern Ecuador
- The Exonerated (2005) – crime drama television film telling the stories of six wrongfully convicted inmates: Delbert Tibbs, Kerry Max Cook, Gary Gauger, David Keaton, Robert Earl Hayes and Sunny Jacobs, and their paths to freedom
- The Exorcism of Emily Rose (2005) – supernatural horror legal drama film telling the story of Anneliese Michel and follows a self-proclaimed agnostic who acts as defense counsel representing a parish priest, accused by the state of negligent homicide after he performed an exorcism
- Express Kidnapping (Spanish: Secuestro Express) (2005) – Venezuelan crime drama film based on director Jonathan Jakubowicz's own experience of being kidnapped
- Faith of My Fathers (2005) – biographical drama television film based on the story of Lieutenant Commander John McCain's experiences as a prisoner of war in North Vietnam for five and a half years during the Vietnam War, interleaved with his memories of growing up in a heritage rich with military service
- Fateless (Hungarian: Sorstalanság) (2005) – Hungarian romantic war drama film telling the story of a teenage boy who is sent to Auschwitz and Buchenwald, based on the semi-autobiographical novel Fatelessness by the Nobel Prize-winner Imre Kertész
- Fighting the Odds: The Marilyn Gambrell Story (2005) – biographical drama television film depicting the true story of a former parole officer named Marilyn Gambrell, who helped a group of students at M. B. Smiley High School in Houston, Texas
- Firecracker (2005) – crime thriller film based on a real-life murder that occurred in Wamego in the 1950s, three blocks from the house where director Steve Balderson grew up
- The Flight That Fought Back (2005) – biographical drama film about United Airlines Flight 93
- Forest of the Gods (Lithuanian: Dievų miškas) (2005) – Lithuanian-British war drama film based on Balys Sruoga's experiences in the Nazi Stutthof concentration camp
- A Friend of the Family (2005) – Canadian drama television film depicting the true story of David Snow (the "Cottage Killer")
- The Game of Their Lives (2005) – biographical sport drama film based on the true story of the 1950 U.S. soccer team which, against all odds, beat England 1–0 in the city of Belo Horizonte, Brazil during the 1950 FIFA World Cup
- Get Rich or Die Tryin' (2005) – crime drama film loosely inspired by the life of 50 Cent
- Gie (2005) – Indonesian biographical drama film telling the story of Soe Hok Gie, a graduate from University of Indonesia who is known as an activist and nature lover
- Good Night, and Good Luck (2005) – American-French-British-Japanese historical drama film about American television news, portraying the conflict between veteran journalist Edward R. Murrow and U.S. Senator Joseph McCarthy of Wisconsin
- The Government Inspector (2005) – British biographical drama television film based on the life of David Kelly and the lead-up to the Iraq War in the United Kingdom
- The Great Raid (2005) – American-Australian war drama film about the Raid at Cabanatuan on the island of Luzon, Philippines during World War II
- The Greatest Game Ever Played (2005) – biographical sport drama film based on the early life of amateur golf champion Francis Ouimet and his surprise winning of the 1913 U.S. Open
- Have No Fear: The Life of Pope John Paul II (2005) – biographical drama television film centring on the life of Pope John Paul II
- The Heart in the Pit (Italian: Il Cuore nel Pozzo) (2005) – Italian biographical war television film focusing on the escape of a group of children from Tito's partisans in the aftermath of World War II, as they start an ethnic cleansing of all Italians from Istria and the Julian March
- Heart of the Beholder (2005) – drama film based on Ken Tipton's own experience as the owner of a chain of videocassette rental stores in the 1980s
- Hello, Brother (Korean: 안녕, 형아) (2005) – South Korean drama film portraying a mischievous young boy's reaction to his older brother's battle with childhood cancer – based on the true story of siblings Seol-hwi and Chang-hwi
- The Hunt for the BTK Killer (2005) – biographical horror television film based on the true story of Dennis Rader, the notorious "BTK Killer" who murdered 10 people from 1974 to 1991
- I Am a Sex Addict (2005) – biographical comedy film chronicling Caveh Zahedi's sex addiction and its impact on his life, relationships, and film making
- Imperium: Saint Peter (2005) – Italian Christian drama film about the life and work of Saint Peter
- Jarhead (2005) – biographical war drama film recounting Anthony Swofford's enlistment and service in the United States Marine Corps during the Persian Gulf War, in which he served as a Scout Sniper Trainee with the Surveillance and Target Acquisition (STA) Platoon of 2nd Battalion, 7th Marines
- Joseph Smith: The Prophet of the Restoration (2005) – Christian biographical film focusing on some of the events during the life of Joseph Smith, founder of the Latter Day Saint movement, which was both filmed and distributed by the Church of Jesus Christ of Latter-day Saints
- Joyeux Noël (2005) – international co-production war drama film based on the Christmas truce of December 1914, depicted through the eyes of French, British, and German soldiers
- Karol: A Man Who Became Pope (Italian: Karol, un uomo diventato Papa) (2005) – Italian biographical miniseries about Karol Wojtyła, later known as Pope John Paul II, beginning in 1939 when Karol was only 19 years old and ending at the 1978 papal election that made him Pope
- The King and the Clown (Korean: 왕의 남자) (2005) – South Korean historical drama film about Yeonsangun of Joseon, a Joseon dynasty king and a court clown who mocks him
- Kingdom of Heaven (2005) – British-German-American epic historical drama film depicting a heavily fictionalised portrayal of the events leading to the Third Crusade, focusing mainly on Balian of Ibelin who fights to defend the Crusader Kingdom of Jerusalem from the Ayyubid Sultan Saladin
- Kinky Boots (2005) – British comedy drama film about a drag queen who comes to the rescue of a man who, after inheriting his father's shoe factory, needs to diversify his product if he wants to keep the business afloat – based on a true story
- Knights of the South Bronx (2005) – drama television film based on the true story of David MacEnulty, who taught schoolchildren of the Bronx Community Elementary School to play chess at competition level, eventually winning New York City and the New York State Chess Championships
- Kyan Sit Min (Burmese: ကျန်စစ်မင်း) (2005) – Burmese historical drama film following the story of King Kyansittha of Bagan Dynasty
- The Laserman (Swedish: Lasermannen) (2005) – Swedish crime drama miniseries based on the Lasermannen events
- Last Days (2005) – biographical drama film loosely based the last days of Kurt Cobain
- The Last Mitterrand (French: Le Promeneur du Champ de Mars) (2005) – French biographical film depicting the final period in the life of François Mitterrand
- Lies My Mother Told Me (2005) – Canadian crime drama television film loosely based on the true story of the murder of Larry McNabney by his wife, Elisa McNabney, with the help of college student Sarah Dutra
- Loggerheads (2005) – drama film telling the story of an adoption "triad"—birth mother, child, and adoptive parents—each in three interwoven stories in the days leading up to Mother's Day, and each in one of the three distinctive geographical regions of North Carolina: Appalachian Mountains, Piedmont (a broad, gently hilly plateau) and Atlantic Coastal Plain – inspired by true events
- Lord of War (2005) – crime drama film inspired by five criminal arms dealer, with some focusing on the Russian arms dealer Viktor Bout
- Lords of Dogtown (2005) – biographical drama film based on the true story of the Zephyr Skate Team, a young group of surfers-turned-skateboarders from 1970s Venice Beach, California that revolutionized the sport of skateboarding
- Mangal Pandey: The Rising (Hindi: मंगल पांडे: द राइजिंग) (2005) – Indian Hindi-language historical drama film based on the life of Mangal Pandey, an Indian soldier known for helping to spark the Indian Rebellion of 1857
- Marathon (Korean: 말아톤) (2005) – South Korean drama film based on the true story of Bae Hyeong-jin, an autistic marathon runner
- Marian, Again (2005) – British psychological thriller miniseries based upon the real-life kidnapping of Colleen Stan in the United States
- Martha: Behind Bars (2005) – biographical prison television film chronicling domestic diva Martha Stewart's court case regarding ImClone stocks, and subsequent time behind bars
- Melissa P. (2005) – Italian-Spanish erotic drama film based on the 2003 semi-autobiographical novel 100 colpi di spazzola prima di andare a dormire (One Hundred Strokes of the Brush Before Bed) by Melissa Panarello
- Mozart and the Whale (2005) – romantic comedy drama film loosely based on the lives of Jerry and Mary Newport
- Mrs. Harris (2005) – American-British drama television film focusing on the tempestuous relationship between Herman Tarnower, noted cardiologist and author of the New York Times bestseller The Complete Scarsdale Medical Diet, and headmistress Jean Harris
- Mrs Henderson Presents (2005) – British-American biographical musical comedy drama film telling the true story of Laura Henderson, an eccentric British socialite who opened the Windmill Theatre in London in 1931
- Munich (2005) – American-Canadian epic historical drama film depicting an account of Mossad assassinations following the Munich massacre
- Murder in the Hamptons (2005) – Canadian crime drama television film based on the events leading to the murder of multi-millionaire Ted Ammon and the conviction of Ted's estranged wife's lover Daniel Pelosi
- Murder Unveiled (2005) – Canadian crime drama television film based on the true story of the Jaswinder Kaur Sidhu murder
- My Family and Other Animals (2005) – British comedy drama television film based on the 1956 autobiographical book of the same title written by Gerald Durrell, in which he describes a series of anecdotes relating to his family's stay on Corfu from 1935 to 1939, when he was aged 10–14
- The New World (2005) – British-American historical romantic drama film depicting the founding of the Jamestown, Virginia, settlement and inspired by the historical figures Captain John Smith, Pocahontas of the Powhatan tribe, and Englishman John Rolfe
- Nomad (Kazakh: Көшпенділер) (2005) – Kazakh epic historical film depicting a fictionalized account of the youth and coming-of-age of Ablai Khan, a Khan of the Kazakh Horde, as he grows and fights to defend the fortress at Hazrat-e Turkestan from Dzungar invaders during the Kazakh-Dzungar Wars
- North Country (2005) – legal drama film chronicling the case of Jenson v. Eveleth Taconite Company and USW Local 2705 which supported the employers efforts through the horrific events and ensuing legal battles
- The Notorious Bettie Page (2005) – biographical drama film focusing on 1950s pinup and bondage model Bettie Page
- On the Mountain of Tai Hang (Mandarin: 太行山上) (2005) – Chinese historical film about the newly formed Eighth Route Army, led by general commander Zhu De, marching east cross the Yellow River to form Mount Tai Hang military region during the Second Sino-Japanese War
- Our Fathers (2005) – crime drama television film depicting a dramatized account of the hidden sexual abuse and scandal that shook the foundation of the Catholic Church
- Pierrepoint (2005) – British biographical drama film about the life of British executioner Albert Pierrepoint
- Plague City: SARS in Toronto (2005) – Canadian medical thriller television film revolving around the 2003 outbreak of severe acute respiratory syndrome (SARS) in Toronto
- Pope John Paul II (2005) – biographical miniseries dramatizing the life of Pope John Paul II from his early adult years in Poland to his death at age 84
- The President's Last Bang (Korean: 그때 그사람들) (2005) – South Korean biographical black comedy film about the events leading to and the aftermath of the assassination of Park Chung Hee, then the South Korean President, by his close friend and Korean Intelligence Agency director Kim Jae-kyu
- The Prize Winner of Defiance, Ohio (2005) – biographical drama film based on the true story of housewife Evelyn Ryan, who helped support her husband, Kelly, and their 10 children by winning jingle-writing contests
- The Queen's Sister (2005) – British biographical television film depicting an account of the life of Princess Margaret, the younger sister of Queen Elizabeth II, from 1952 until the mid-1970s
- Red Like the Sky (Italian: Rosso come il cielo) (2005) – Italian coming-of-age drama film based on the childhood experiences of sound editor Mirco Mencacci
- The Rocket (2005) – Canadian biographical sport drama film about the ice hockey player Maurice "The Rocket" Richard
- Romanzo Criminale (2005) – Italian crime drama film inspired by the true story of the Banda della Magliana
- See Arnold Run (2005) – biographical drama television film covering Arnold Schwarzenegger's early years in bodybuilding and his successful run for Governor of California
- Sehar (Hindi: सहर) (2005) – Indian Hindi-language crime drama film loosely based on the encounter of Shri Prakash Shukla, who was eliminated by the newly formed Special Task Force of the Uttar Pradesh Police
- Self Medicated (2005) – biographical drama film about a troubled teenager whose mother has him kidnapped at age 17 by a private company and forcibly committed to a locked-down psychiatric institute, based on a real events
- Shadowless Sword (Korean: 무영검) (2005) – South Korean epic historical film following the exploits of Dae Jeong-hyun, the last prince of the Balhae Kingdom, who hides his identity in a small village until he is called to battle invaders from Khitan
- Shania: A Life in Eight Albums (2005) – Canadian biographical drama film about Canadian country star Shania Twain
- Shooting Dogs (2005) – British-German biographical drama film based on the experiences of BBC news producer David Belton, who worked in Rwanda during the Rwandan genocide
- Sins (2005) – Indian English-language drama film based on a news story that director Vinod Pande read in 1988 about a Kerala priest sentenced to death on sexual harassment and murder charges
- Sometimes in April (2005) – Rwandan-French-American historical drama film about the 1994 Rwandan genocide
- Sophie Scholl – The Final Days (German: Sophie Scholl – Die letzten Tage) (2005) – German historical drama film about the last days in the life of Sophie Scholl, a 21-year-old member of the anti-Nazi non-violent student resistance group the White Rose, part of the German Resistance movement
- Space Race (2005) British biographical drama miniseries chronicling the major events and characters in the American/Soviet space race up to the first landing of a man on the Moon
- Speer and Hitler: The Devil's Architect (German: Speer und Er) (2005) – German biographical drama miniseries about the role Albert Speer in the Third Reich
- Spirit Bear: The Simon Jackson Story (2005) – Canadian family biographical drama film based on the real life campaign by Spirit Bear Youth Coalition founder Simon Jackson to save the habitat of the Kermode bear
- Stoned (2005) – British biographical film about Brian Jones, one of the founding members of The Rolling Stones
- The Strait Story (Mandarin: 南方紀事之浮世光影) (2005) – Taiwanese biographical film about the young but noteworthy Taiwanese sculptor and painter, Huang Ching-cheng
- The Sun (Russian: Сóлнце) (2005) – Russian biographical drama film depicting Japanese Emperor Shōwa (Hirohito) during the final days of World War II
- Syriana (2005) – epic political thriller film about the state of the oil industry in the hands of those personally involved in and affected by it, loosely based on Robert Baer's 2003 memoir See No Evil
- Taj Mahal: An Eternal Love Story (Hindi: ताज महल एक शाश्वत प्रेम कहानी) (2005) – Indian Hindi-language historical drama film about Shah Jahan, who commissioned the built of the Taj Mahal in 1632 for his wife Mumtaz Mahal's tomb
- Terry (2005) – Canadian biographical sport drama film about Canadian amputee athlete Terry Fox, dramatizing his national Marathon of Hope run across Canada to raise money for cancer research
- The Tin Mine (Thai: มหา’ลัย เหมืองแร่) (2005) – Thai biographical drama film depicting a semi-autobiographical account of growing up in a mining camp in Kapong District of Phang Nga Province from 1949 to 1953
- Trump Unauthorized (2005) – biographical drama television film about businessman and future President of the United States Donald Trump
- Two Sons of Francisco (Portuguese: Dois Filhos de Francisco) (2005) – Brazilian biographical drama film about the lives of the musicians Zezé Di Camargo & Luciano
- The Virgin Queen (2005) – British historical drama miniseries based upon the life of Queen Elizabeth I
- Walk the Line (2005) – biographical drama film following Johnny Cash's early life, his romance with the singer June Carter, his ascent in the country music scene, and his drug addiction
- Wallis & Edward (2005) – British historical drama television film dramatizing the events of the Edward VIII abdication crisis
- Warm Springs (2005) – biographical drama television film concerning U.S. President Franklin D. Roosevelt's 1921 illness, diagnosed at the time as polio, his struggle to overcome paralysis, his discovery of the Warm Springs resort, his work to turn it into a center for the rehabilitation of polio victims, and his resumption of his political career
- The White Masai (German: Die weiße Massai) (2005) – German romantic drama film a woman who falls in love in Kenya with a Maasai man – based on an autobiographical novel of the same name by the German born writer Corinne Hofmann
- Wolf Creek (2005) – Australian crime horror film inspired by the real-life murders of backpackers by Ivan Milat in the 1990s
- The World's Fastest Indian (2005) – New Zealander biographical sport drama film based on the Invercargill, New Zealand speed bike racer Burt Munro and his highly modified 1920 Indian Scout motorcycle
- Yamato (Japanese: 男たちの大和) (2005) – Japanese war drama film telling the story of the crew of the World War II Japanese battleship Yamato, concentrating on the ship's demise during Operation Ten-Go
- Young Andersen (Danish: Unge Andersen) (2005) – Danish biographical miniseries chronicling the formative boarding school years of fairy tale writer Hans Christian Andersen and his subsequent arrival at Copenhagen where he struggles for success and recognition
- The Zodiac (2005) – crime psychological thriller film based on the true events associated with the Zodiac: a serial killer who was active in and around northern California in the 1960s and 1970s
