= Witness to Innocence =

US non-profit organization

Witness to Innocence (WTI) is a non-profit organization based out of Philadelphia, Pennsylvania, dedicated to the effort of abolishing the death penalty in the United States. WTI began as a project of The Moratorium Campaign, led by Jené O'Keefe. Kurt Rosenberg took over in 2005 with sponsorship from Sister Helen Prejean, Witness to Innocence is the only nationwide organization composed of exonerated former death row prisoners, men who were sentenced to death only to later have their innocence revealed. WTI supports these exonerated death row survivors through semi-annual retreats and by running a speakers' bureau.

== Mission statement ==
Witness to Innocence works to end the death penalty by highlighting wrongful convictions in death sentencing in the United States. It also provides organizational and peer-to-peer support to exonerated former death row prisoners and their loved ones. Composed of exonerated former death row prisoners and their families, the organization collaborates with national, state, and local anti-death penalty groups to educate citizens and promote political action against the death penalty through personal stories of death row survivors. Witness to Innocence's priorities include ending the death penalty by coordinating educational and political activities featuring those most impacted by capital punishment and assisting individuals and their loved ones in their transition to life after exoneration.

== History ==
WTI began as a project of The Moratorium Campaign founded by Sister Helen Prejean and led by Jené O'Keefe. In 2005, WTI became its own organization and was founded as the only national organization led by and composed of exonerated ex-death row prisoners and their loved ones. It held its first national gathering in Orlando, Florida, for training, outreach, organizing, leadership, and speaking (TOOLS). The organization has since hosted similar gatherings in Wisconsin, North Carolina, Texas, Pennsylvania, and Alabama. The gatherings consist of organizational development, training workshops, educational activities, peer support sessions, and public anti-death penalty actions. Witness to Innocence also launched its Speakers' Bureau in 2005, providing a platform of empowerment for its membership of exonerated death row survivors to share their stories with audiences around the country. Since its foundation, the WTI speakers' bureau has reached over 25,000 people at nearly 500 events in 37 states.

Witness to Innocence has also played a collaborative role in the abolition of the New Jersey death penalty in 2007, the successful campaign against reinstating the death penalty in Wisconsin, and – most recently – the repeal of New Mexico's death penalty in 2009.

== Membership ==
Witness to Innocence utilizes the innocence list compiled by the Death Penalty Information Center (DPIC) of people exonerated from death row. The criteria for inclusion on the DPIC innocence list states that, "Defendants must have been convicted, sentenced to death and subsequently either a) their conviction was overturned AND i) they were acquitted at re-trial or ii) all charges were dropped b) they were given an absolute pardon by the governor based on new evidence of innocence."

Proponents of the death penalty cast doubt on the validity of this list, partially because not all of the exonerated former prisoners were on death row at the time of exoneration. All of the 138 people currently on the DPIC list were at some time sentenced to death and were exonerated by the aforementioned legal standards.

=== News, books, and media ===
Witness to Innocence and its members have been featured in numerous publications and news articles, including Parade magazine, the Tucson Weekly, the Austin American-Statesman, the Fort Worth Star-Telegram, The Litchfield County Times, Westport News, and the North Carolina Star-News.

WTI member and the 100th former death row prisoner to be exonerated, Ray Krone, was also featured on Good Morning America and an episode of Extreme Makeover in its third season. The play and made-for-cable television film, The Exonerated, features Witness to Innocence members Delbert Tibbs (played by Delroy Lindo) and David Keaton (played by Danny Glover) as two of its characters. Other projects that feature innocent former death row prisoners include John Grisham's first nonfiction work, The Innocent Man, Frank Baumgartner's The Decline of the Death Penalty and the Discovery of Innocence, and sociologist Stanley Cohen's The Wrong Men: America's epidemic of wrongful death row convictions.
