= The White Masai =

The White Masai may refer to:

- The White Masai (novel), an autobiographical novel by Corinne Hofmann
- The White Masai (film), a 2005 film based on the novel
