= Aidan Quinn =

Irish-American actor (born 1959)

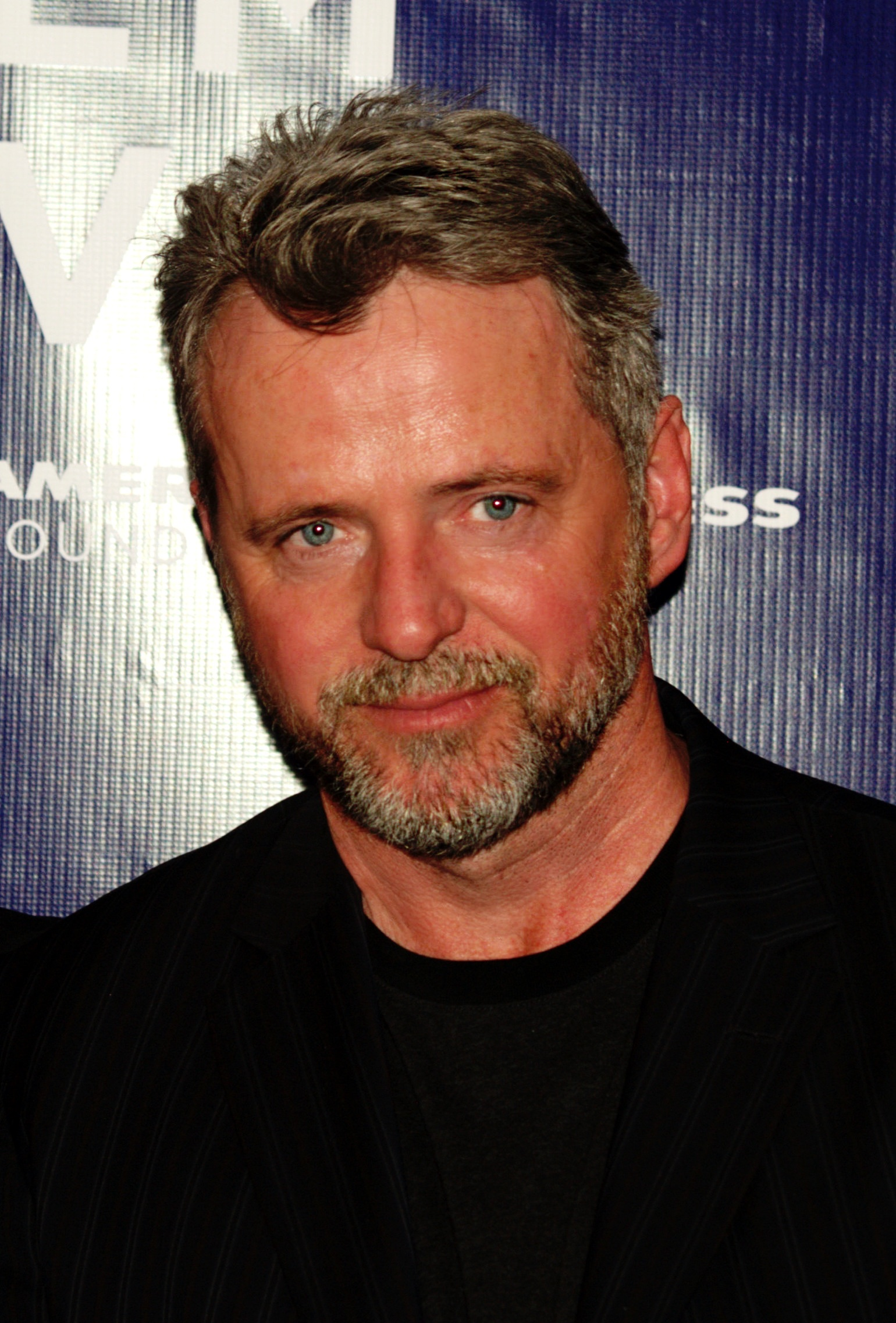
- Quinn at the premiere of Handsome Harry at the 2009 Tribeca Film Festival
- Born: March 8, 1959 (age 67); Chicago, Illinois, U.S.
- Occupation: Actor
- Years active: 1979–present
- Spouse: Elizabeth Bracco (m. 1987)
- Children: 2

Aidan Quinn (born March 8, 1959) is an American actor. He made his film debut in Reckless (1984), and has starred in over 80 feature films, including Desperately Seeking Susan (1985), The Mission (1986), Stakeout (1987), All My Sons (1987), Avalon (1990), The Handmaid's Tale (1990), Benny & Joon (1993), Legends of the Fall (1994), Mary Shelley's Frankenstein (1994), Michael Collins (1996), Practical Magic (1998), Song for a Raggy Boy (2003), Wild Child (2008) and Unknown (2011). He also played Captain Thomas "Tommy" Gregson on the CBS television series Elementary (2012–19).

Quinn has received two Primetime Emmy Award nominations for his performances in the television films An Early Frost (1985) and Bury My Heart at Wounded Knee (2007). Highly active in Irish cinema as well as in the United States, Quinn is a four-time Irish Film and Television (IFTA) Award nominee, winning Best Supporting Actor in a Film for the Conor McPherson film The Eclipse (2009).

== Early life ==
Quinn was born in Chicago, Illinois, to Irish Catholic parents. He was raised in Chicago and Rockford, Illinois, as well as in Dublin and Birr, County Offaly, Ireland. His mother, Teresa, was a homemaker, but also worked as a bookkeeper and in the travel business, and his father, Michael Quinn, was a professor of English literature at Rock Valley College. When he was nineteen and working as a roofer, Quinn realized he wanted to become an actor. He trained at the Piven Theatre Workshop.

He has three brothers and a sister. His older brother, Declan Quinn, is a cinematographer, and his younger sister, Marian, is an actress, director and writer. His brother Paul, an actor and director, died in 2015 at the age of 55.

== Career ==
His first significant film role was in Reckless, followed by a breakthrough role in Desperately Seeking Susan as the character "Dez" (the love interest of the character played by Rosanna Arquette). Quinn next starred in the controversial television film An Early Frost, about a young gay lawyer dying of AIDS (it was broadcast on NBC on November 11, 1985, and co-starred Gena Rowlands, Ben Gazzara and Sylvia Sidney). He received his first Emmy Award nomination for the role. He made a short, well received contribution as Robert De Niro's brother in The Mission. He played escaped convict Richard "Stick" Montgomery in the action comedy Stakeout opposite Richard Dreyfuss and Emilio Estevez.

In 1988, Quinn lost the role of Jesus Christ when Paramount Pictures dropped the distribution rights to the Martin Scorsese movie The Last Temptation of Christ. When Universal Pictures picked up the film, the role went to Willem Dafoe. In the meantime, Quinn starred as the protagonist in the film Crusoe, finished in 1989.

During the 1990s, he appeared in Legends of the Fall, Benny & Joon, The Handmaid's Tale, Haunted and Practical Magic. He also starred in Michael Collins, Song for a Raggy Boy, This Is My Father, and Evelyn. He had a cameo appearance as the captain of a doomed Arctic vessel in the Francis Ford Coppola-produced adaptation of Frankenstein.

In 2000, Quinn portrayed Paul McCartney in the VH1 television drama Two of Us.

Quinn played Kerry Max Cook in the 2005 movie The Exonerated, a true story about people on death row who had been freed.

Quinn played the main character on the NBC drama The Book of Daniel in 2006. After the first three weeks of its run, the show was canceled, and its last five episodes never aired. In 2007, Quinn received his second Emmy nomination for the television movie Bury My Heart at Wounded Knee.

In 2010, he played a cameo role as William Rainsferd in the French-made film Sarah's Key, set during World War II.

He starred as Dermot opposite Taylor Schilling (Abby) in the Canadian-Irish drama film Stay (2013).

Quinn co-starred in the CBS Television series Elementary.

== Personal life ==
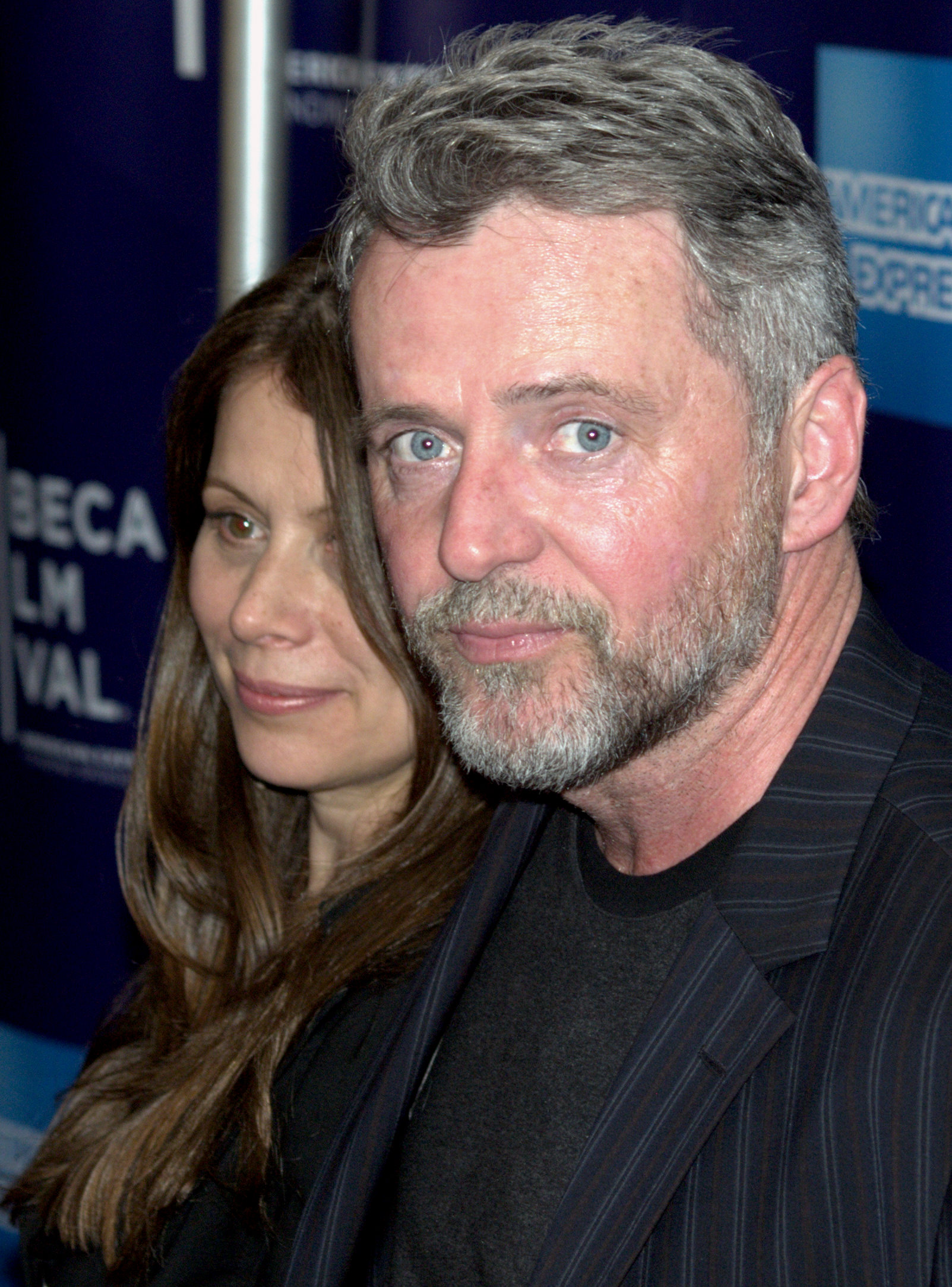
Elizabeth Bracco and Quinn, 2009

In 1987, Quinn married his Stakeout co-star Elizabeth Bracco (sister of actress Lorraine Bracco). They have two daughters: Mia (b. 1998) and Ava Eileen (b. 1989), who is autistic. Ava appeared as the baby "David" in Avalon, and Mia played a ghost in The Eclipse. He has controversially suggested that the MMR vaccine led to his daughter's autism diagnosis. Former residents of Englewood, New Jersey, Quinn and his family now live in Palisades, Rockland County, New York, and Marbletown in the Catskills / Woodstock region of Ulster County, New York.

As an avid sports fan, Quinn supports the Chicago Cubs, the Green Bay Packers, Michael Jordan, Rory McIlroy, and Roger Federer.

Quinn is also an outspoken critic of Donald Trump.

== Philanthropy ==
Quinn has participated in charity golf events for the East Lake Foundation, a community redevelopment program, and Samuel L. Jackson's "One for the Boys" campaign about testicular cancer awareness. In 2010, Quinn attended a premiere benefit screening of A Shine of Rainbows for the International Children's Media Center (ICMC) and The American Ireland Fund (AIF). In 1991, he read a segment from Franz Kafka's The Metamorphosis as part of MTV's "Books: Feed Your Head" literacy promotion PSAs.

Quinn spoke at the 2003 "Night of Too Many Stars" gala benefiting The Autism Coalition. He was an honorary board member of the National Alliance for Autism Research (NAAR), which merged with Autism Speaks.

== Filmography ==
=== Film ===
Year	Title	Role	Notes
1982	My Favorite Year behind Bologna 1/2 hour in		
1984	Reckless	Johnny Rourke	
1985	Desperately Seeking Susan	Dez	
1985	An Early Frost	Michael Pierson	
1986	The Mission	Felipe Mendoza	
1987	Stakeout	Richard 'Stick' Montgomery	
1989	Crusoe	Crusoe	
1990	The Handmaid's Tale	Nick	
1990	The Lemon Sisters	Frankie McGuinness	
1990	Avalon	Jules Kaye	
1991	At Play in the Fields of the Lord	Martin Quarrier	
1992	The Playboys	Tom Casey	
1993	Benny & Joon	Benjamin 'Benny' Pearl	
1994	Blink	Det. John Hallstrom	
1994	Mary Shelley's Frankenstein	Cpt. Robert Walton	
1994	Legends of the Fall	Alfred Ludlow	
1995	The Stars Fell on Henrietta	Don Day	
1995	Haunted	Prof. David Ash	
1995	Lumière and Company	Himself	Short film: "John Boorman"
1996	Looking for Richard	Richmond	
1996	Michael Collins	Harry Boland	
1997	Commandments	Seth Warner	
1997	The Assignment	Lt. Cmdr. Annibal Ramirez / Carlos	
1998	This Is My Father	Kieran O'Day	Also executive producer
1998	Practical Magic	Officer Gary Hallet	
1999	In Dreams	Paul Cooper	
1999	Music of the Heart	Brian Turner	
2000	Songcatcher	Tom Bledsoe	
2002	Stolen Summer	Joe O'Malley	'
2002	Evelyn	Nick Barron	
2003	Song for a Raggy Boy	William Franklin	
2004	Bobby Jones: Stroke of Genius	Harry Vardon	
2004	Shadow of Fear	Detective Scofield	
2004	Return to Sender	Frank Nitzche	
2004	Proud	Commodore Alfred Lind	
2005	Nine Lives	Henry	
2007	Dark Matter	Prof. Jacob Reiser	
2007	32A	Frank Brennan	
2008	Wild Child	Gerry Moore	
2009	A Shine of Rainbows	Alec O'Donnell	
2009	The Eclipse	Nicholas Holden	
2009	Handsome Harry	Prof. Porter	
2010	Flipped	Richard Baker	
2010	Festival of Lights	Adem	
2010	Jonah Hex	President Ulysses S. Grant	
2010	Sarah's Key	William Rainsferd	
2010	Across the Line: The Exodus of Charlie Wright	Charlie Wright	
2010	The 5th Quarter	Steven Abbate	
2010	The Pilgrims: The Journey to a New World for Autism	Himself	Documentary
2011	Unknown	Martin B.	
2011	The Stand Up	Sandy Hardwick	
2011	The Greening of Whitney Brown	Henry Brown	
2011	Muide Éire	Himself	Documentary
2012	If I Were You	Derek	
2012	Allegiance	Lieutenant Colonel Owens	
2013	The Last Keepers	John Carver	
2013	Rushlights	Cameron Brogden	
2013	Stay	Dermot Fay	
2014	Journey to Sundance	Himself	Documentary
2018	Change in the Air	Moody	
2021	Spiked	John Wilson	
2022	Blacklight	Gabriel Robinson	
2023	Daughter of the Bride	Bruce	
2026	Cry from the Sea	Father MacGabhann	

=== Television ===
Year	Title	Role	Notes
1981	American Dream	Scooter	Episode: "Casey's Romance"
1985	An Early Frost	Michael Pierson	Television movie
1987	All My Sons	Chris Keller	Television movie
1989	Perfect Witness	Sam Paxton	Television movie
1991	Lies of the Twins	James McEwen/Jonathan McEwan	Television movie
1992	A Private Matter	Bob Finkbine	Television movie
1994	Baseball	Himself/Various	2 episodes
1995	The Irish in America	Narrator	TV movie
1995	Out of Ireland: The Story of Irish Emigration to America	Narrator	TV movie
1997	Forbidden Territory: Stanley's Search for Livingstone	Henry Morton Stanley	TV movie
2000	The Prince and the Pauper	Miles Hendon	TV movie
2000	Two of Us	Paul McCartney	TV movie
2000	The Young Messiah	Narrator	Voice; TV movie
2001	Night Visions	Jeremy Bell	Episode: "The Passenger List"
2003	Benedict Arnold: A Question of Honor	Gen. Benedict Arnold	TV movie
2003	Freedom: A History of US	Mob Member/Philadelphia Press Editorial	2 episodes
2004	See You in My Dreams	Joe F. Brown	TV movie
2004	Plainsong	Tom Guthrie	TV movie
2004	Cavedweller	Clint Windsor	TV movie
2004	Miracle Run	Douglas Thomas	TV movie
2004–2005	Third Watch	Lieutenant/Captain John Miller	5 episodes
2005	The Exonerated	Kerry Max Cook	TV movie
2005	Empire Falls	David Roby	2 episodes
2005	Mayday	John Berry	TV movie
2006	The Book of Daniel	Daniel Webster	8 episodes
2007	Bury My Heart at Wounded Knee	Henry L. Dawes	TV movie
2007	Law & Order: Special Victims Unit	Ben Nicholson	Episode: "Savant"
2008	Canterbury's Law	Matthew 'Matt' Furey	5 episodes
2008	The Prince of Motor City	Charlie Hamilton	Pilot
2010	White Collar	Prof. George Oswald	Episode: "Copycat Caffrey"
2011	Weeds	Foster 'Chuck' Klein	4 episodes
2011	Prime Suspect	Lt. Kevin Sweeney	Recurring role
2012	The Horses of McBride	Matt Davidson	TV movie
2012–2019	Elementary	Captain Thomas 'Tommy' Gregson	Main role
2014	From Tee to Green: The Story of Irish Golf	Narrator	Voice; 3 episodes
2019	The American Guest	Theodore Roosevelt	Main role
2021-2022	Law & Order: Special Victims Unit	Burton Lowe	Episodes: "The Five Hundredth Episode" & "Confess Your Sins to be Free"
2024	Blue Bloods	Detective Gus Vanderlip	Episode: "The Heart of a Saturday Night"
2025	The Walsh Sisters	Jack Walsh	Upcoming comedy drama series

=== Theatre ===
Year	Production	Role	Venue
1979	The Man in 605	Jerry Green	Piven Theatre Workshop
	Scheherazade		Chicago
	The Irish Hebrew Lesson		Chicago
1984	Fool for Love	Eddie	Douglas Fairbanks Theater
1985	Hamlet	Prince Hamlet	Wisdom Bridge Theatre
1985–1986	A Lie of the Mind	Frankie	Promenade Theatre
1988	A Streetcar Named Desire	Stanley Kowalski	Circle in the Square Theatre
2003	The Exonerated	Kerry Max Cook	45 Bleecker Theater; Curran Theatre
2004	Trumbo: Red, White and Blacklisted	Dalton Trumbo	Westside Theatre
2005	The Exonerated	Kerry Max Cook	Queen's Hall
2006	The Exonerated	Kerry Max Cook	Riverside Studios; Dublin Theatre Festival
2008	Conversations in Tusculum	Brutus	The Public Theater

== Awards and nominations ==
Year	Award	Work	Result
1986	Primetime Emmy Award for Outstanding Lead Actor in a Miniseries or Special	An Early Frost	Nominated
1988	Theatre World Award	A Streetcar Named Desire	Won
1993	CableACE Award for Supporting Actor in a Movie or Miniseries	A Private Matter	Nominated
1999	Irish Film and Television Award for Best Actor in a Male Role	This Is My Father	Nominated
1999	Blockbuster Entertainment Award for Favorite Actor – Comedy / Romance	Practical Magic	Nominated
2000	Sundance Film Festival – Special Jury Prize For Ensemble Cast (shared with cast)	Songcatcher	Won
2003	Irish Film & Television Award (IFTA) for Best Actor in a Film – Public Vote	—N/a	Nominated
2003	Irish Film & Television Award (IFTA) for Best Actor in a Film – Jury Award	Song for a Raggy Boy	Nominated
2005	Irish Film & Television Award (IFTA) for Best Actor in a Feature Film	Return to Sender (aka Convicted)	Nominated
2005	Independent Spirit Award for Best Supporting Male	Cavedweller	Nominated
2005	Gotham Award for Best Ensemble Cast (shared with cast)	Nine Lives	Nominated
2007	Primetime Emmy Award for Outstanding Supporting Actor in a Miniseries or Movie	Bury My Heart at Wounded Knee	Nominated
2007	Online Film & Television Association (OFTA) Award for Best Supporting Actor in a Motion Picture or Miniseries	Bury My Heart at Wounded Knee	Nominated
2007	Satellite Award for Best Actor in a Miniseries or a Motion Picture Made for Television	Bury My Heart at Wounded Knee	Nominated
2010	Irish Film & Television Award (IFTA) for Best Actor in a Supporting Role – Film	The Eclipse	Won
