= Hermine Huntgeburth =

German film director (born 1957)

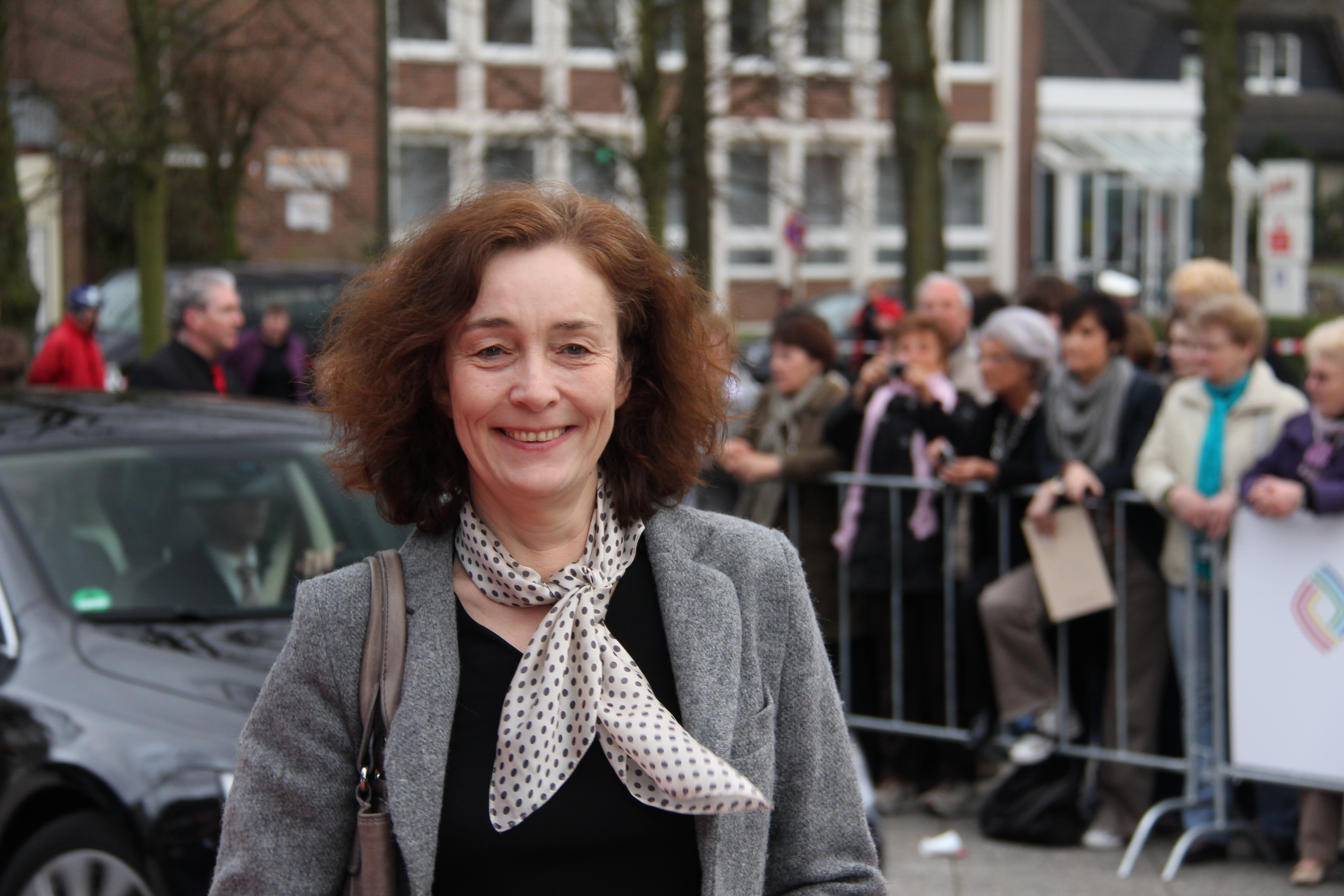
- Huntgeburth in 2011
- Born: 13 November 1957 (age 68); Paderborn, West Germany
- Occupation: Film director
- Years active: 1988-present

Hermine Huntgeburth (born 13 November 1957) is a German film director producer and university lecturer. She is best known for her 2005 film The White Masai.

== Background ==
Huntgeburth grew up in a Catholic family of doctors with nine siblings in Paderborn. In 1977, she began studying film at the University of Fine Arts of Hamburg under Rüdiger Neumann. In 1983, she was awarded a DAAD scholarship and studied film in Sydney. During her studies, she worked on various screenplays, assisted in theatre direction, worked as a cinematographer and film technician.

Her first feature film, Im Kreise der Lieben, produced for NDR, won the Federal German Film Award in Gold for Best Newcomer Director.

Hermine Huntgeburth's style is characterised by a laconic humour and the exploration of the boundaries between the everyday and the grotesque, as can be seen in the feature film Das Trio with a gay pickpocket as the main character. Many of her films depict the turning of love into hate or apathy. In the Ingrid Noll film Der Hahn ist tot, love suddenly turns to murder, brothers become enemies in Die Stunde des Wolfs. In the television film Das verflixte 17. Jahr, the married couple only discover after 17 years, when the children are already grown up, that there is nothing left of their love. Her film The White Masai, starring Nina Hoss, is an adaptation of a novel by Corinne Hofmann and shows the difficulties of love in a completely different cultural background. Her Mark Twain adaptations Tom Sawyer and The Adventures of Huck Finn were released in cinemas in 2011 and 2012. Hermine Huntgeburth is a supporter of the initiative ProQuote Regie. Huntgeburth regularly teaches at the International Film School Cologne. She was a member of the board of the German Film Academy from 2018 to 2022 and is a member of the Free Academy of the Arts in Hamburg since 2005.

== Awards ==
- 1991: Förderpreis des Landes Nordrhein-Westfalen
- 2002: Adolf-Grimme-Preis for Romeo
- 2005: Deutscher Fernsehpreis in the category Best Director für Der Boxer und die Friseuse
- 2008: Bayerischer Fernsehpreis für Teufelsbraten
- 2009: Adolf-Grimme-Preis für Teufelsbraten
- 2011: Grimme-Preis für Neue Vahr Süd
- 2011: Bayerischer Fernsehpreis für Neue Vahr Süd
- 2011: Gilde-Filmpreis, Bester Kinderfilm für Tom Sawyer
- 2014: Deutscher Regiepreis Metropolis in der Kategorie Beste Regie Fernsehfilm für Männertreu
- 2015: Grimme-Preis für Männertreu

== Selected filmography ==
- The Terrible Threesome (1991)
- Gefährliche Freundin (1996, TV film)
- The Trio (1998)
- Stunde des Wolfs (2000, TV film)
- The Coq Is Dead (2000, TV film)
- Das Verflixte 17. Jahr (2001, TV film)
- Romeo (2001, TV film)
- Bibi Blocksberg (2002)
- Der Boxer und die Friseuse (2004, TV Film)
- The White Masai (2005)
- Teufelsbraten (2008, TV Film)
- Effi Briest (2009)
- The Lost Father (2010, TV film)
- Neue Vahr Süd (2010, TV film)
- Tom Sawyer (2011)
- The Adventures of Huck Finn (2012)
- Eine Hand wäscht die andere (2012, TV film)
- A Faithful Husband (2014, TV film)
- Lindenberg! Mach dein Ding (2020)
- Die Wespe (2021, TV Mini Series)
