= International Festival of Cinema and Audiovisual of Burundi =

The International Festival of Cinema and Audiovisual of Burundi (FESTICAB) is an annual film festival held in Burundi.

FESTICAB was established by the film director Léonce Ngabo in 2009. It comprises competitions in three categories: Burundian films, East African films and international films.

At the 2011 FESTICAB the East African Film Network (EAFN) was founded. The 2015 FESTICAB was disrupted by the protests against President Nkurunziza running for a third term, and many screenings needed to be cancelled.

== FESTICAB winners ==
2010

- Best Burundian Work: Taxi-Love by Jean Marie Ndihokubwayo

2011

- Best Short Film: Mwansa the Great by Rungano Nyoni
- Special Jury Prize: Hasaki Ya Suda / Three Black Samura by Cédric Ido

2012

- Best Documentary: Justice for Sale

2014

- Best East African Short Film: Shoeshine by Amil Shivji

2016

- Best East African Feature Film: Bahati by Timothy Conrad
- Best Short Film: VIRAL by Nifasha Florian

2017

- Best Actor: Modo Emmanuel
