= The Exonerated =

- Written by: Erik Jensen; Jessica Blank
- Directed by: Bob Balaban
- Starring: David Brown Jr. Brian Dennehy; Danny Glover; Delroy Lindo; Aidan Quinn; Susan Sarandon; David Soul; Lee Tergesen
- Theme music composer: David Robbins
- Country of origin: United States
- Original language: English

Production
- Producers: Greg Schultz; Steven Tabakin; Karen Wolfe
- Editor: Andy Keir
- Running time: 95 minutes

Original release
- Network: CourtTV
- Release: January 27, 2005

The Exonerated is a made-for-cable television film that dramatizes the stories of six people, some of whom were wrongfully convicted of murder and other offenses, placed on death row, and later exonerated and freed after serving varying years in prison. It was based on a successful stage play of the same name written by Erik Jensen and Jessica Blank and first aired on the former CourtTV cable television network on January 27, 2005. It is directed by Bob Balaban and was produced by Radical Media.

Actors played the roles of the five men and one woman. It stars David Brown, Jr. (the only cast member to have appeared in the stage play - he played Robert Earl Hayes), Brian Dennehy as Gary Gauger, Danny Glover as David Keaton, Delroy Lindo as Delbert Tibbs, Aidan Quinn as Kerry Max Cook and Susan Sarandon as Sonia "Sunny" Jacobs. The script was based on the exonerees' personal experiences as well as court records and media accounts.

Jessica Blank, who is married to Erik Jensen, got the idea for the play when she moved from Minneapolis, Minnesota to New York City. She and Jensen attended a conference about the death penalty and listened to stories about wrongful convictions and confessions gained via torture, threats and deception. The couple spent the summer of 2000 interviewing exonerees throughout the United States and adapted the stories of six people into a script.

The play was first presented in New York City; the final performance was in Minneapolis in 2002. For their efforts, Jensen and Blank received the Champion of Justice Award from the National Association of Criminal Defense Lawyers.

== The exonerated ==
- Kerry Max Cook: Convicted of murdering a neighbor in Texas in 1977; exonerated in 1997.
- Gary Gauger: Convicted of murdering his mother and father in Illinois in 1993; exonerated in 1996.
- Robert Earl Hayes: African-American racetrack worker convicted of the murder of a white woman in Florida in 1990; found not guilty at retrial in 1997. In 2004, Hayes pleaded guilty to murdering a woman in New York in 1987. In 2022, DNA testing also proved his guilt of the murder in the woman in Florida, albeit he cannot be retried in that case as a result of double jeopardy.
- Sonia "Sunny" Jacobs: Convicted, along with common-law husband, Jesse Tafero, and his friend, Walter Rhodes, of murdering Philip Black, a Florida state trooper and Donald Irwin, a visiting Canadian constable in 1976; Jacobs was not exonerated. Her death sentence was overturned in 1981, and she was sentenced to life with a 25-year minimum mandatory sentence. In 1992 her case was reversed on appeal, and she pleaded guilty to second-degree murder, and was released on time served. Tafero was executed by electric chair in 1990. In 2011, she married Peter Pringle, who had himself been exonerated after being sentenced to death in Ireland for the murder of two officers of the Garda Síochána, the Irish police force, Henry Byrne and John Morley. The officers were shot while chasing three armed masked men who had robbed a bank and were fleeing the crime scene. Their car collided with the getaway vehicle and the robbers opened fire. In Ireland, the murders caused national outrage. A former IRA volunteer, Pringle was in the area and came under suspicion. In 2025 Jacobs died in a house fire in Ireland.
- David Keaton: convicted of murdering a Florida police officer in 1971; exonerated in 1973.
- Delbert Tibbs: African-American Florida man convicted of murdering a white man and raping his girlfriend in 1974; exonerated in 1977.

At the end of the movie, each actor is voiced over by the real life exonerees and then fades to show them as their current selves at the time of filming.

Aidan Quinn reprised his role as Kerry Max Cook in the staging of The Exonerated at the Dublin Theatre Festival in Dublin, Ireland, in October 2006 as well as the stage version in New York City. David Soul took over the role of Gary Gauger for several of the Dublin performances.

== See also ==
- List of exonerated death row inmates
- List of wrongful convictions in the United States
