= Hasaki Ya Suda =

- Directed by: Cédric Ido
- Screenplay by: Cédric Ido
- Produced by: DACP Films I Do Films
- Starring: Kylian Amable; Jacky Ido; Cédric Ido; Minman Ma; Ralph Amoussou
- Cinematography: Thomas Garret
- Edited by: Samuel Danesi
- Music by: Nicola Tescari David Chalmin
- Release date: 2011
- Running time: 24 minutes
- Countries: Burkina Faso; France
- Language: Lingala

Hasaki Ya Suda is a 2011 film.

== Synopsis ==
The year is 2100. The global warming has caused massive droughts that have led to conflicts and famines. The first victims of the global warming are the Southern populations, forced to leave their lands to immigrate to the North. A massive exodus that makes chaos out of the known world order. Now, the earth is reduced to one giant no man's land. Lost and defenseless, the survivors have no choice but to return to ancestral rites. All over the world, clans form and fight for the last natural resources and fertile lands.

== Awards ==
- Festival International du Cinéma et de l'Audiovisuel du Burundi (FESTICAB) 2011
- Prix qualité CNC 2012
