= Effi Briest (2009 film) =

- Directed by: Hermine Huntgeburth
- Starring: Julia Jentsch; Sebastian Koch
- Release date: 12 February 2009 (BIFF)
- Running time: 1h 58min
- Country: Germany
- Language: German

Effi Briest is a 2009 German drama film directed by Hermine Huntgeburth. It is based on the 1895 novel Effi Briest by Theodor Fontane.

== Cast ==
- Julia Jentsch as Effi von Briest
- Sebastian Koch as Geert von Instetten
- Mišel Matičević as Major Crampas
- Margarita Broich as Roswitha
- Barbara Auer as Johanna
- Juliane Köhler as Luise von Briest
- Thomas Thieme as Herr von Briest
- Rüdiger Vogler as Gieshübler
- Ludwig Blochberger as Nienkerken
