= Taxi Brooklyn =

- Genre: Action comedy; Comedy drama; Police procedural
- Based on: Taxi by Luc Besson
- Developed by: Gary Scott Thompson; Stephen Tolkin; Franck Ollivier
- Starring: Chyler Leigh; Jacky Ido; James Colby; José Zúñiga; Jennifer Esposito; Bill Heck; Ally Walker; Raul Casso
- Composer: Nathaniel Méchaly
- Countries of origin: France; United States
- Original language: English
- No. of seasons: 1
- No. of episodes: 12

Production
- Executive producers: Edouard de Vesinne; Gary Scott Thompson; Thomas Anargyros; Olivier Megaton
- Production location: New York City
- Running time: 43 minutes
- Production companies: EuropaCorp Television; Gary Scott Thompson Productions

Original release
- Network: NBC (United States); TF1 (France)
- Release: April 14 – May 12, 2014

Taxi Brooklyn is an action comedy police procedural television series, produced by EuropaCorp Television. The series stars Chyler Leigh and Jacky Ido, and is based upon the film Taxi written by Luc Besson. On March 6, 2015, NBC canceled the series in the United States.

== Synopsis ==
Caitlin "Cat" Sullivan is an NYPD detective working in Brooklyn. After her driving privileges are suspended, she relies on Leo Romba, a Brooklyn cab driver from France. Leo becomes Cat's driver and a de facto consultant on her cases. While solving crimes with Leo, Cat is also running her own unauthorized investigation into the death of her father, an NYPD detective thought to have been killed by the Capella crime family. In doing so, she clashes with her boss, Captain Baker, and her ex-husband Gregg, who has picked up the case for the FBI.

== Cast ==
=== Main ===
- Chyler Leigh as Detective Caitlin Mary Darcy "Cat" Sullivan, a second-generation, Irish-American detective with the fictional 125th Precinct (in reality, the precinct that serves the Prospect Park area is the 78th Precinct). She achieved some level of notoriety after capturing the "Prospect Park Stalker". After her driving privileges are suspended, she commandeers Leo Romba, a French taxi driver, to become her personal valet. She is recently divorced from FBI Special Agent Gregg James. She attended Catholic school, where she was starting point guard during her senior year on both her school's All-City and All-State teams, but is now a lapsed Catholic. Growing up, she was best friends with Annabella Capella (Justine Cotsonas), the granddaughter of the head of the Capella crime family who has since taken over the family business. She is highly uncomfortable with her mother's affair with the police captain. Her late father was a dirty cop on the Capella family's payroll, who murdered Annabella's grandfather to escape an Internal Affairs investigation, and was killed in revenge.
- Jacky Ido as Leo Romba, a Brooklyn cab driver from Marseille, France, who becomes Cat's driver and a consultant for the 125th Precinct. He spent four years in a French prison for serving as a getaway driver; he testified against the robbers and spent two years in solitary confinement. As a result, Leo has developed claustrophobia. He has a son, Nico, that he loves very much, and an ex-wife, Aimee, who has since remarried. He considers Frankie (Cat's mother) a close friend. In "Revenge", it is revealed that Aimee is separated from her new husband; she and Nico are kidnapped immediately after their arrival in New York by Leo's former partner-in-crime, Henry.
- James Colby as Captain John Baker, the commander of the 125th Precinct. He is Cat's godfather, and recently he has begun an affair with her mother.
- José Zúñiga as Detective Eddie Esposito, Cat's co-worker and rival at the 125th Precinct.
- Jennifer Esposito as Dr. Monica Pena, a medical examiner with the Brooklyn Borough Office of the Chief Medical Examiner and a friend of Cat's.
- Bill Heck as Special Agent Gregg James, an FBI agent and Cat's ex-husband. In "Revenge", he is shot by a Capella family shooter.
- Ally Walker as Frankie Sullivan, Cat's widowed mother. She and Leo are good friends.
- Raul Casso as Ronnie, a fellow cab driver and a close friend of Leo's; notable for a mock-flamboyant personality.

=== Recurring ===
- Luke Roberts as Rhys
- Caterina Murino as Giada

== Episodes ==
No.	Title	Directed by	Written by	Original release date (France)	U.S. release date	French viewers (millions)	U.S. viewers (millions)
1	"Pilot"	Olivier Megaton	Teleplay by : Gary Scott Thompson	April 14, 2014	June 25, 2014	5.37	5.34
Detective Cat Sullivan's boss suspends her driving privileges after a pursuit leads to a crash and a minor injury to Esposito, her current partner. She is also removed from the bank robbery case that led to the crash and the arrest of a taxi driver named Leo, thought to be an accessory to the crimes. Her ex-husband Gregg takes over the case. Leo convinces Cat of his innocence, and offers to drive her during her suspension. The two thwart another hit by the same crew, while Cat is also able to make headway in the cold case surrounding the mysterious death of her father, a former NYPD detective.
2	"Brooklyn Heights"	Olivier Megaton	Teleplay by : Gary Scott Thompson & Stephen Tolkin	April 14, 2014	July 2, 2014	4.7	5.24
Cat and Leo try to locate Ian, the hard-partying son of wealthy handbag designer Sasha Lowenthal, when he goes missing. After Ian is found dead, several Lowenthal family secrets are uncovered. Elsewhere, Leo is found to have lied on his immigration forms. To keep him from being deported, Cat must become Leo's sponsor, and 100% responsible for keeping him out of trouble.
3	"Cherchez les femmes"	Frédéric Berthe	Story by : Franck Ollivier & Stephen Tolkin; Teleplay by : Franck Ollivier, Stephen Tolkin & Gary Scott Thompson	April 14, 2014	July 9, 2014	3.7	4.62
Josef Wiesel, a Holocaust survivor that Leo had given rides to regularly, is found dead. Cat and Leo find $10,000 cash in Josef's apartment with instructions for his burial arrangements; and further investigation incriminates the Capella crime family, responsible for the death of Cat's father. Cat visits Anabella Capella, her childhood friend and the daughter of a "good apple" in the family. While there, Cat verbally clashes with Annabella's cousin Luke. Cat meets with Gregg to see if an investigation has been opened on her father's murder. He confirms there is an investigation and that it appears Internal Affairs have made a cover-up attempt. Later, Gregg confirms that Annabella ordered the death of Cat's father.
4	"Precious Cargo"	Frédéric Berthe	Andrea Stevens	April 21, 2014	July 16, 2014	4.78	4.73
Cat, Esposito, and Pena investigate the shooting death of a foster mom, called a "saint" by her neighbors because she has taken in kids from the system that nobody else wants. The case gets complicated when the most reliable witness to the crime, a 10-year-old boy, goes missing and Cat and Leo must track him down. It turns out the mom and her husband are nothing like their outward appearances. Cat reveals to a disbelieving Captain Baker that she suspects her childhood friend Annabella is now heading up the crime family that killed her father. She also receives more mysterious texts about her life being in danger because she knows too much. When she reveals this to Gregg, he wants to put her in protective custody, which she refuses.
5	"Ambush"	Alain Tasma	Richard Sweren	April 21, 2014	July 23, 2014	4.3	5.60
While in the cab, Cat and Leo witness a prison transport van being cornered and disabled. During a shoot-out, two prisoners are killed, but four others escape after Cat takes on the attackers. Cat discovers that the only witness to her father's murder is among the escapees, so she assumes the Capella family ordered the ambush. It turns out that a Russian crime boss is after a different prisoner, but Cat must still try to locate the witness to keep her out of harm's way. Meanwhile, Cat sets up Captain Baker on a date with Frankie, but unknown to her the two had already been dating.
6	"Love Hurts"	Alain Tasma	Franck Ollivier	April 21, 2014	July 30, 2014	3.4	5.25
The wife of a stalker/killer who had once targeted Cat turns up dead. It looks like the killer's M.O., but he is in prison. Suspicion falls on the killer's brother, who had been witnessed at the wife's home several times. Cat and Leo visit the man in Sing Sing, and he insists that neither his wife nor his brother would turn on him. Cat learns from Mae, the prosecutor in the original case, that the wife had filed a lawsuit against Cat for entrapment, which means she benefits from the woman's death. Cat then tells Leo she had received regular letters from a "fan" who praised her for capturing the stalker, but she had quit reading them after a while. The two catch up on the letters and find a pattern that leads them to believe the most recent killings were done by someone who was in the courtroom during the original hearings. The latest letter suggests the fan plans to kill Cat, then kill himself/herself. The fan turns out to be Mae, who locks Cat in a cage. Mae stabs Leo as he tries to rescue Cat, then slices her own throat. Cat manages to get Leo to the hospital in time to save his life.
7	"Black Widow"	David Morley	James Kee & David Bradley Halls	April 28, 2014	August 6, 2014	5.03	5.23
After a young father-to-be named Alan dies of an apparent suicide, Monica tells Cat that suicide was not possible, but the man was instead murdered. Monica later reveals that Alan is one of three men whose recent deaths suggest homicide, and that they are all in their 20s and "gifted" anatomically. When the three are found to have all been on the same gigolo website and that an older woman named Jeanette was a common client, Leo is used as bait to entrap this apparent black widow. Later, it is found that a very much alive college student named Diego was the real client of Jeanette's, and that his roommate was mistakenly killed. Diego had started blackmailing Jeanette's billionaire defense contractor husband, and he had ordered the killings of all his wife's recent suitors, not knowing where the blackmail letters were coming from. Leo is ultimately put in danger, along with Esposito when he tries to intervene. Elsewhere, Cat has her first date with Rhys, but it ends uncomfortably.
8	"Deadline Brooklyn"	David Morley	Steve Cochrane	April 28, 2014	August 13, 2014	4.86	4.94
Following up on reports of a dead body in a dumpster, Cat and Leo investigate only to have the man spring to life, steal a car, and crash it. Before he dies, the man spews some seemingly disconnected words and phrases, which Cat and the other detectives try to make sense of. Monica reveals that the man died of a virus that must have been weaponized. Together with other clues, the team determines that the virus will be unleashed in a wide-spread area within the next 24 hours. Connecting this case to a secret wedding between an Iranian woman and a French-Jew, the team discovers at the last minute that a flower vendor is delivering the virus in a traditional bridal egg. Cat and Esposito arrive just in time to see the vendor drop the egg off a roof where the wedding ceremony is about to take place, leaving Leo to save the day. Meanwhile, Leo acts jealous upon meeting Rhys for the first time.
9	"Double Identity"	Frédéric Berthe	Robert Nathan	May 5, 2014	August 20, 2014	4.62	4.60
A woman named Fernanda Flores is shot while leaving a restaurant, just as Leo lets Frankie out of the cab nearby. Frankie recognizes Fernanda as a maid from El Salvador who works in her building. As Fernanda recovers in the hospital, Leo becomes convinced that she is involved in the drug trade. A dry cleaner who is known for laundering money is later shot by a man matching the description of the restaurant shooter. Gregg gets orders "from above" to back off the case, later telling Cat that the orders came from the CIA. The two have sex, which Cat regrets in the morning. Fernanda turns out to have been a detective in Venezuela, who legally changed her name upon coming to the U.S. Fernanda also lost her parents in a car crash. Her brother, who was also in the car, was never found. A neighbor of Fernanda's turns out to be a CIA agent who stole the boy when his wife could not have children, and his bodyguard has been doing the shootings. Fernanda is reunited with her brother for the first time in years.
10	"The Longest Night"	Frédéric Berthe	Teleplay by : Vince McKewin; Based on a teleplay by:Franck Ollivier	May 5, 2014	August 27, 2014	4.2	4.42
Cat arrests a gang member during a citywide blackout, but he manages to escape on the way to booking and shoots two officers at the precinct.
11	"Frenchmen Can't Jump"	Gérard Krawczyk	Vince McKewin	May 12, 2014	September 3, 2014	4.57	5.26
Cat and Leo investigate the murder of a motorcycle messenger, and Cat gets her driver's license back - which means she won't need Leo anymore.
12	"Revenge"	Gérard Krawczyk	Gary Scott Thompson	May 12, 2014	September 10, 2014	4.1	5.12
A mob boss plots to kidnap Leo's son and ex-wife, who are headed to New York. Meanwhile, Cat has to help Gregg prove himself innocent of a brutal crime.

== Broadcast ==
Taxi Brooklyn premiered in Belgium on March 21, 2014, on La Deux, and in France on April 14, 2014, on TF1. In the United States, the series premiered on June 25, 2014, on NBC, and in both Australia and the United Kingdom on May 25, 2015 on Netflix.

== Reception ==
On Rotten Tomatoes season 1 has an approval rating of 35% based on reviews from 6 positive and 11 negative critic reviews. The website consensus reads: "It's decent summer escapism, but Taxi Brooklyn's storylines detour too much to ring true."
