= The Exonerated (play) =

2000 play by Jessica Blank and Erik Jensen

- Written by: Jessica Blank; Erik Jensen
- Genre: Drama

Premiere
- Date: October 2000
- Place: 45 Bleecker Theater

The Exonerated is a 2000 play by Jessica Blank and Erik Jensen that debuted Off-Broadway in October 2000 at 45 Bleecker Theater and ran for over 600 performances. It won numerous awards including the Lucille Lortel Award for Unique Theatrical Experience, the Drama Desk Award for Unique Theatrical Experience, and the Outer Critics Circle Award for Outstanding Off-Broadway Play. It was adapted into a 2005 film by the same name.

== Plot ==
The work combines first-person narrative with legal records to tell the stories of six former death row inmates: Delbert Tibbs, Kerry Max Cook, Gary Gauger, David Keaton, Robert Earl Hayes and Sunny Jacobs, and their paths to freedom. Tibbs, Cook, Gauger, Keaton, and Hayes were legally exonerated, while Jacobs took an Alford plea to a lesser charge and was freed on time served. In 2004, Hayes pleaded guilty to murdering a woman in New York in 1987. In 2022, DNA testing also proved his guilt of the murder in the woman in Florida, albeit he cannot be retried in that case as a result of double jeopardy.

The production is performed as an anthology by 10 actors seated behind music stands. Their accounts of the freed convicts emphasize their lives after being sentenced to death, including much of the legal proceedings that gained their exoneration.

== Cast ==
The original cast was as follows:

- Delbert Tibbs – Charles Brown
- Robert Earl Hayes – David Brown, Jr.
- Sunny Jacobs – Jill Clayburgh
- Kerry Max Cook – Richard Dreyfuss
- Sue Gauger/Sandra – Sara Gilbert
- Male Ensemble – Bruce Kronenberg, Philip Levy
- David Keaton – Curtis McClarin
- Gary Gauger – Jay O. Sanders
- Georgia Hayes, et al. – April Yvette Thompson

== Productions ==
During the summer of 2000, Jensen and Blank traveled to interview 40 former death row inmates who had been freed by the state after having served as much as 22 years in prison. After previews beginning on October 1, the play debuted Off-Broadway on October 10, 2002, at 45 Bleecker Theater, directed by Bob Balaban. The original run lasted from October 10, 2002, to March 7, 2004.

A revival of the play ran from September 19, 2012, to December 2, 2012, at the same theater, with a rotating cast that included Brian Dennehy, Stockard Channing, Delroy Lindo, Brooke Shields, and Lyle Lovett. The play was later performed for a 16-week run at the Riverside Studios theater in London, where it was supported by death penalty opponent Amnesty International.

In December 2002, the play was performed by a cast that included Richard Dreyfuss, Danny Glover and Mike Farrell, for Illinois Governor George Ryan, other politicians, and attorneys. A group of exonerated individuals also attended.

Ryan was reviewing how to handle death row inmates in light of the publicity surrounding those who had been convicted during Chicago Police Commander Jon Burge's tenure, which ended when he was fired in 1993. He had been the subject of numerous complaints to the police board and suits against the city for abusing suspects and coercing confessions. In 2006 the results of an investigation were presented to the city of Chicago, saying there was evidence sufficient to indict Burge, but the statute of limitations for the crimes had been exceeded.

Ryan declared a moratorium on the use of the death sentence in the state in 2000. In early January 2003, shortly before he left office, he pardoned four men whom he believed to be innocent. On January 11, 2003, having lost confidence in the state's penal system, Ryan commuted the death sentences of 167 prisoners on Illinois’ death row to life imprisonment. He said that would allow them to appeal their convictions.

In 2005, the play was adapted into a film of the same name, starring Susan Sarandon, Danny Glover and Brian Dennehy. That February, Simon & Schuster published Jensen and Blank's memoir, Living Justice: Love, Freedom and the Making of The Exonerated.

In 2018 a notable revival took place at The Secret Theatre in Queens, NY, produced by Richard Mazda. It was unusual both in that the cast acted out all of scenarios as they were described, a departure from the traditional reader's theatre staging, and in that the director had a documented criminal history. The director was DeMone Seraphin (Nikkieli DeMone Lewis), assisted by Krysta Hibbard. Movement by Tamrin Goldberg and Fight Direction and Dramaturgy by Meron Langsner. The cast consisted of James Washington, Laura Lockwood, Alphonso Walker Jr., Chelsea Davis, Mark Keeton, Tommy Norton, Greg Warren, Ruby Littman, Tyler Waage, and Sean Jarrel. The final performances were attended by Kerry Max Cook.

== Awards ==
The original production, which ran for 608 performances, won the 2003 Lucille Lortel Award for Unique Theatrical Experience, the 2003 Drama Desk Award for Unique Theatrical Experience, and the 2003 Outer Critics Circle Award for Outstanding Off-Broadway Play. It has also won the National Association of Criminal Defense Lawyers' Champion of Justice Award and Court TV's Scales of Justice Award.
