= Delbert Tibbs =

American poet (1939–2013)

Delbert Lee Tibbs
- Delbert Tibbs in 2011 — Viewminder's Man of the Year
- Born: June 19, 1939; Shelby, Mississippi, U.S.
- Died: November 23, 2013 (aged 74); Chicago, Illinois, U.S.
- Education: Chicago Theological Seminary
- Occupations: Writer; anti-death penalty activist
- Known for: Accused of rape and murder
- Status: Exonerated
- Penalty: Death

Delbert Lee Tibbs (June 19, 1939 – November 23, 2013) was an American man who was wrongfully convicted of murder and rape in 1974 in Florida and sentenced to death. Later exonerated, Tibbs became a writer and anti-death penalty activist.

== Early life ==
Tibbs was born June 19, 1939, in Shelby, Mississippi; he moved with his family to Chicago at age 12, as part of the Great Migration from the South to the North. He attended the Chicago Theological Seminary from 1970 to 1972.

== Incident ==
In 1974, 27-year-old Terry Milroy and 17-year-old Cynthia Nadeau were violently attacked near Fort Myers, Florida. Milroy was murdered and Nadeau was raped. She reported that they had been picked up while hitchhiking by a black man who fatally shot her boyfriend, and then beat and raped her, leaving her unconscious by the side of the road. That night, Nadeau gave the police a detailed description of the assailant and his truck.

== Arrest, trial, and conviction ==
Several days later, Tibbs was hitchhiking in Florida about 220 miles north of the crime scene when he was stopped by a patrolman since he matched the description given by Nadeau. The photographed Tibbs and relayed the pictures to the Fort Myers police. When Nadeau examined these photos, she identified Tibbs as her attacker. A judge issued a warrant for Tibbs' arrest. He was picked up in Mississippi two weeks later and sent to Florida. Nadeau subsequently picked Tibbs out of a lineup and positively identified him at trial as the man who raped her and murdered her boyfriend.

Tibbs' attorney attempted to show that Nadeau was an unreliable witness. She admitted during cross-examination that she had tried "just about all" types of drugs and that she had smoked marihuana shortly before the crimes occurred. Id. at 526, 545–546. She also evidenced some confusion about the time of day that the assailant had offered her and Milroy a ride. Finally, counsel suggested through questions and closing argument that Nadeau's former boyfriend had killed Milroy, and that Nadeau was lying to protect her boyfriend. Nadeau flatly denied these suggestions

During the trial, the prosecution supplemented the victim's identification with testimony from a jailhouse informant, who claimed Tibbs had confessed to the crime. Tibbs claimed he had an alibi. However, the prosecution produced a card with Tibbs's signature that directly contradicted part of his alibi.

The all-white jury convicted Tibbs of murder and rape, and he was sentenced to death.

== Post-trial and appeal ==
After the trial, the informant recanted his testimony, saying he had fabricated his account hoping for leniency in his own rape case. On appeal, the Florida Supreme Court remanded the case and reversed the decision, on the grounds that there was "considerable doubt that Delbert Tibbs is the man who committed the crimes." The court ordered a retrial. Tibbs was released in January 1977. Without the informant's testimony, convicting Tibbs would be extremely difficult. Nadeau was a drug addict and the truck was never found. In 1982, the Lee County State Attorney dismissed all charges, ending the chance of a retrial. No alternate suspect was ever found.

In 2006, the prosecutor who chose not to try Tibbs told the Florida Commission on Capital Crimes that "Tibbs, in my opinion, was never an innocent man wrongfully accused. He was a lucky human being. He was guilty, he was lucky and now he is free. His 1974 conviction was not a miscarriage of justice."

== Subsequent campaigning ==
After that time Tibbs worked as an anti-death penalty activist. He also sought changes in the criminal justice system, especially limits on the use of eyewitness identifications which numerous studies have shown to be unreliable and highly flawed.

Tibbs was one of six persons featured in the play The Exonerated (2002), based on accounts from death row inmates who were exonerated. (See Legacy, below.) The authors said that he was one of the inmates who showed belief in something larger to sustain him. He had said to them, "I realized if I internalized all the pain, and all the anger, and all the hurt, I'd be dead already."

Tibbs was among the audience when Governor George Ryan of Illinois and other politicians watched a production of the play. Ryan ordered a review of use of the death penalty in Illinois. Disturbed by learning more about injustices and a high rate of exonerations, in 2003, before leaving office, Ryan commuted the death sentences of 167 inmates on death row to life imprisonment. Later Tibbs was with a group talking to Governor Quinn about injustices in the penal system.

On February 14, 2011, Tibbs, along with fellow exonerees and anti-death penalty activists, spoke with Illinois Governor Pat Quinn about repealing the death penalty in their state. A month later, on March 14, 2011, Quinn signed a bill to repeal the death penalty in Illinois.

== Writer ==
Tibbs began writing during prison, and published a book of poetry after his release entitled Poems Prayers & Logics (ENAAQ Publications, 1984). He later published Selected Poems and Other Words/Works (2007), edited by O'Modele Jeanette Rouselle and published in New York by the Manifestation-Glow Press. His poetry also appears in the chapbook anthology Beccaria (2011), edited by poet Aja Beech.

== Representation in other media ==
In November 1976, Pete Seeger wrote and recorded the anti-death penalty song "Delbert Tibbs".

Eric Jensen and Jessica Blank wrote The Exonerated, a play about Tibbs and five other people who have been freed. It premiered in 2002 Off-Broadway in New York City. The playwrights recount how each person was convicted of murder and sentenced to death, in addition to exploring their exoneration after varying years of imprisonment.

The Exonerated was adapted as a television film by the same name, which first aired on the CourtTV cable television station on January 27, 2005. Tibbs is portrayed by Delroy Lindo. At the end the film fades from the actor to Tibbs, who talks about his experience and his hopes.

== Death ==
Tibbs died of cancer on November 23, 2013. He was 74.

== See also ==
- List of wrongful convictions in the United States
