= Red Like the Sky =

- Directed by: Cristiano Bortone
- Screenplay by: Cristiano Bortone; Paolo Sassanelli; Monica Zapelli
- Cinematography: Vladan Radovic
- Music by: Ezio Bosso
- Release date: 2005
- Language: Italian

Red Like the Sky (Italian: Rosso come il cielo) is a 2005 Italian coming-of-age drama film written and directed by Cristiano Bortone and starring Luca Capriotti and Paolo Sassanelli. It is based on the childhood experiences of sound editor Mirco Mencacci.

The film won 19 critic and festival awards, including audience awards at the São Paulo International Film Festival and Sydney Film Festival. It also won a David di Donatello of the Youth from the Accademia del Cinema Italiano.

== Plot ==
In 1970, ten-year-old Tuscan boy Mirco loses his sight following an accident with his father's rifle.

The parents are forced to make him attend an institution for the blind in Genoa. There, unable to use braille, he finds an old tape recorder and manages to invent fairy tales made only of noises and narration. In the meantime, he meets Francesca, the daughter of the concierge of the house next to them, although they could not meet. Mirco will increasingly involve all the other blind children by making them understand how much they are worth and how similar they are to all the other kids.

In the end the teacher organizes a play created by the kids, and all parents are impressed by it. Mirco's parents eventually decide to bring him home for the summer holidays.

At the opening it is said that the film is based on a true story, and before the closing credits we read: "Mirco left school at 16 years old. Although he has never recovered his sight, today he is one of the most recognized sound editors of Italian cinema."

== Cast ==
- Luca Capriotti as Mirco
- Paolo Sassanelli as Don Giulio
- Marco Cocci as Ettore
- Francesca Maturanza as Francesca
- Rosanna Gentili as Mirco's mother
- Simone Colombari as Mirco's father
- Simone Gullì as Felice
- Giusi Merli as Mirco's teacher

== Awards ==
2007 - David di Donatello

- David Giovani Award

San Paolo Intl. Film Festival

- Audience Award: Best foreign film

Sydney International Film Festival

- Best Film: Youth Jury Award

International Festival of film for children and young adults (Hamedan City, Iran)

- Best Film, Best Script, CIFEJ prizes

Montreal Int. L Youth Film Festival - Fifem

- Grand Prix de Montreal, Prix Place aux Familles

European Youth Film Festival of Flanders

- Audience Award

XXXIV Premio internazionale Flaiano

- Audience Award

Schilingel children Film Festival (Germany)

- Best Film
- Young Public Award
- Best Actor

Palm Beach Film Festival

- Best film
- Best Director

Syracuse International Film Festival

- Best Feature Film Award, Best Music Award
- Best Writing Award
- Special Jury Citation for Children Acting

== See also ==
- List of Italian films of 2005
