= Gary Gauger =

American wrongfully convicted of murder

Gary Gauger (born January 21, 1952) is a formerly imprisoned convict, who was falsely accused and convicted of the murders of his parents, Morris and Ruth Gauger, and later exonerated. Following the murder on April 8, 1993, Gauger ultimately spent nearly two years in prison and 9 months on death row before being released in March 1996.

== Murder and trial ==
On April 9, 1993, Gary Gauger called the U.S. emergency number 9-1-1 after finding his 74-year-old father's body. Paramedics were summoned, as well as the McHenry County Sheriff's Department, who soon found the body of 70-year-old Ruth Gauger in a trailer on the property.

Gauger told officers he was asleep when his parents were murdered. Despite this, Gauger was interrogated for 21 hours by the police. Officers lied to Gauger and told him that they had found evidence against him. "They told me that they had found bloody clothes in my bedroom; they found a bloody knife in my pocket," he said. After showing Gauger gruesome photographs of his parents, Gauger broke down and confessed. Though Gauger had no memory of the crime, he believed what police had told him. "I thought I must have done it in a blackout," he said. Though he had given a confession, there was no physical evidence held against him in court. Gauger was found guilty of the double murder by a jury. After Gauger waived his right to have a jury determine sentencing, Judge Henry L. Cowlin sentenced Gauger to death on January 11, 1994. The decision shocked his attorneys and surprised even the prosecution since Gauger had no criminal record nor a motive to murder his parents.

Gauger's attorneys filed for a reconsideration of sentencing on the grounds that the mitigation in the case had not been properly considered. Judge Cowlin agreed to reconsider Gauger's sentence after receiving letters from his attorneys. In mitigation, he found that Gauger had no criminal record and was a heavy user of drugs and alcohol. Gauger also had no motive to murder with his parents, whom he had no motive to murder after getting divorced in 1991. Judge Cowlin said there was compelling evidence that Gauger had been under

In 1994, Gauger's sentence was reduced to life in prison since his lack of prior convictions had not been given sufficient weight as mitigation.

== Exoneration ==
On March 8, 1996, the Second District Illinois Appellate Court unanimously reversed and remanded the case for a new trial on the ground that Judge Henry L. Cowlin erred in failing to grant a motion to suppress Gary’s allegedly inculpatory statements. In an unpublished opinion written by Judge S. Louis Rathje, with Judges Robert D. McLaren and Fred A. Geiger concurring, the court held that the statements were the fruit of an arrest made without probable cause and therefore should not have been admitted at the trial.

Without the confession, McHenry County State’s Attorney Gary W. Pack had no choice but to drop the charges, and set Gary free. Pack continued to suggest publicly that Gary had in fact committed the crime and was freed only because the prosecution could not meet its burden of proof without the confession.

In 1997, federal racketeering charges were brought against 17 Wisconsin Outlaws Motorcycle Club members. Two Outlaws members, Randall E. Miller and James W. Schneider, were accused of the double-murder of Morris and Ruth Gauger. Schneider pleaded guilty in 1998. Miller was convicted in 2000 and sentenced to double life in prison.

In 2002, Gauger, who had been free for six years, was pardoned. Despite this, Pack continued to profess that Gary had committed the crime. Miller and Schneider were later charged with the murders in 2004 by Pack, who noted that the previous federal convictions had been for racketeering.

Gauger sued, alleging three McHenry County Sheriff’s detectives conspired to maliciously prosecute him for crimes he didn’t commit. Gauger was denied the right to receive compensation for his imprisonment, citing immunity to the police, detectives, and prosecutors. However, in 2004, Gauger received $61,000 in compensation.

== Post-prison life ==
Gauger gained national attention following his exoneration, and was featured on The Oprah Winfrey Show, 60 Minutes, 20/20, Connie Chung Tonight, A&E Investigative Reports, and Court TV.

Gauger is one of six people whose stories were dramatized in the acclaimed play The Exonerated, portrayed by Penn Jillette. The play, written by Eric Jensen and Jessica Blank, details how each individual was convicted of murder and sentenced to death, in addition to their exoneration after varying years of imprisonment. The Exonerated is a film adaptation, which first aired on the CourtTV cable television station on January 27, 2005. Gauger is portrayed by Brian Dennehy in the film. At the end of the film it fades from the actor to Gauger himself who talks about his wife, his work and his freedom.

Gauger's story is also featured in 'Deadline', a 2004 documentary on the death row prisoners

Gauger has since published a memoir of the ordeal entitled In Spite of the System with Julie Von Bergen.

In 2022 and 2024 Miller, serving life sentences from his 2000 federal conviction, petitioned for compassionate release from prison pursuant to the First Step Act. Both petitions were denied. Gary Gauger opposed the release, writing "He's created his world, he’s living in it," and "No, he shouldn’t be released. He says what's expedient because he wants out."

== See also ==
- List of wrongful convictions in the United States
