= Murder of Larry McNabney =

2001 murder in the U.S.

- Larry (right) and Elisa (left) McNabney
- Location: Los Angeles, California, United States
- Date: September 10, 2001
- Attack type: murder
- Victim: Larry McNabney
- Perpetrators: Elisa McNabney; Sarah Dutra

Laurence William "Larry" McNabney (December 19, 1948 – September 10, 2001) was an American attorney whose body was found buried in a vineyard on February 5, 2002. After a nationwide manhunt, his wife, Elisa McNabney, was captured in Florida and arraigned for first-degree murder. The case made national headlines when police learned that her name was in actuality Laren Renee Sims Jordan, and that she had served time in a Florida prison for fraud and identity theft. Before Elisa could stand trial however, she hanged herself in her jail cell. Elisa's friend Sarah Dutra was later convicted of voluntary manslaughter and sentenced to 11 years in prison for murdering Larry McNabney.

== Background of Elisa McNabney ==
Elisa McNabney (née Redelsperger or Barasch; January 20, 1966 – March 31, 2002) was born Laren Renee Sims to parents Jesse and Jackie Sims in Attleboro, Massachusetts, before moving to Brooksville, Florida. The Simses were a wealthy and prominent family in Brooksville, and by all accounts, Laren had a comfortable and privileged childhood. Laren was a cheerleader and fashion model, and an excellent student at Hernando High School; she had an IQ of 140. Despite her intelligence, she dropped out of high school, got married at the age of eighteen, had two children with two different fathers, and started committing crimes, managing to amass a 113-page-long rap sheet. Laren was arrested for stealing a L'Oreal hair color kit from a Woolworth's in Tampa, Florida. After being released on that charge, she violated her probation by illegally using a credit card belonging to an ex-husband of hers. In 1993, after she was arrested for attempted shoplifting in Texas, she cut off her ankle monitor and fled to Las Vegas, Nevada, with her daughter Haylei Jordan (born January 29, 1985). At the time she met Larry McNabney, Laren had already been married and divorced three times, and was known by then as Laren Jordan.

Over the years, Laren Sims had a total of 38 aliases, including:

- Melissa Godwin
- Tammy Keelin
- Elizabeth Barasch – her former cellmate at Jefferson Correctional Institution
- Eliza/Elisa Barasch – a variant of Elizabeth Barasch
- Elisa Redelsperger – the name she allegedly used when she met Larry McNabney
- Shane Ivaroni – the name she used while she was on the run
- Laren Jordan – her prior married name and the name under which she was arrested

== Marriage to Larry McNabney ==
Jordan, using the alias "Elisa Redelsperger" or "Eliza (or Elisa) Barasch" (sources vary) met Larry McNabney in 1995 when she applied for a job at his Las Vegas law office. She worked as his office manager and assisted McNabney in settling a number of large cases. Subsequently, in late 1995, Larry's law firm was investigated by the Nevada State Bar, which determined that Elisa embezzled more than $74,000 from clients. While he managed to avoid disbarment, his license to practice law in Nevada was revoked, and only if he fired Elisa and never again permitted her to work at his law firm would it be reinstated. Instead, Larry closed down his offices in Reno and Las Vegas in Nevada and moved his practice to Sacramento, California, and, despite the embezzlement, married Elisa in 1996. In an exclusive first-time interview given to 20/20 in 2022, Elisa's daughter Haylei spoke of how McNabney was an alcoholic and drug addict who'd made her feel "unsafe," and testified that she had witnessed him physically abuse her mother, and that McNabney had stalked them and threatened the both of them on numerous occasions that he would kill them both and then kill himself—or hand Elisa off to Florida authorities for her outstanding arrest warrants—if Elisa ever tried to leave him. After a particularly violent altercation between Elisa and Larry, Elisa had Haylei sent off to Maine "for her own safety." In spite of these allegations, McNabney's daughter from a previous marriage, Cristin Olson, denied any reports of physical abuse; however, prior to Elisa, McNabney had been married four times, and two of his ex-wives had restraining orders filed against him, with one claiming he had choked her and slammed her against a car. Another of McNabney's daughters, Tavia Williams, said that after he began dating Elisa, she "drove a wedge" between her and McNabney, and she effectively made McNabney cut off all contact with his children and family.

After McNabney hired Sarah Dutra to work in his Sacramento office as a legal secretary, Elisa and Dutra reportedly spent a lot of time together partying, which caused tensions in Larry and Elisa's marriage. Elisa inundated Sarah with lavish gifts, including but not limited to designer clothes, shoes, high-priced wine, VIP attendance to horse shows, and a brand new BMW—all using Larry's income. Elisa reportedly spent so much time with Sarah that Elisa's daughter, Haylei, was "jealous." Elisa concocted the existence of a boyfriend to conceal the fact that Sarah was regularly sleeping over at the McNabneys' home in Woodbridge, and the fact that she had put Sarah up in an apartment in which she cohabitated with Elisa's daughter, Haylei. Elisa also secretly rented out separate rooms on separate floors for Sarah in the same hotels that she and Larry would stay in while on husband-and-wife vacations, so that she could meet and spend time with Sarah covertly. This, along with the amount of time they were spending together, further infuriated Larry McNabney, and soon, he began to suspect that Sarah and Elisa were involved in a sexual affair.

== Murder and disappearance ==
On September 10, 2001, following a horse show, Elisa McNabney (35), and her friend and fellow employee Sarah Dutra (21), injected Larry with the horse tranquilizer drug xylazine at a Los Angeles hotel. McNabney, 52, was last seen alive being pushed in a wheelchair by Elisa and Sarah at a Los Angeles horse show September 10. A day later, authorities said, Elisa started clearing out his office and sold his $110,000 horse trailer and truck. After months went by with no signs of Larry, his children hired a private investigator to find him, to no avail, and he was ultimately reported missing by both his 25-year-old son, Joe, and a newly hired fellow secretary at his law office, Ginger Miller (25), who'd called police to express her concerns that she had never met the man under whom she was supposedly employed because she was hired the day of his disappearance—September 10—and Elisa and Sarah both had been avoiding giving sufficient explanations as to why, as well as supplying conflicting information on his whereabouts. Miller also testified that she'd witnessed Elisa and Sarah repeatedly cashing checks belonging to McNabney, and she threatened to tell Larry about it, not knowing at that time that he was, in fact, deceased. According to her later confession, Elisa drove to Yosemite National Park to bury Larry, but he was still alive and she returned with the unconscious Larry McNabney in the back seat to Sacramento. After his death the next day, September 12, from receiving the initial tranquilizer injection along with numerous later doses of other tranquilizer injections and mouth drops, it was estimated by the forensic examiners—and then later confirmed by Elisa McNabney—that Elisa and Sarah had kept McNabney's body in the refrigerator in the McNabney garage for three months. His body was later moved to the nearby winery, where it was finally discovered by San Joaquin County Sheriff's Office detectives in a shallow ditch near Linden, California, on February 5, 2002. By that time however, Elisa had liquidated the couple's assets, totaling more than $500,000, and disappeared; she'd last been seen on January 11, 2002, driving a leased red Jaguar.

== Manhunt ==
After the discovery of Larry's body, and after police learned of her true identity and prior criminal history, Elisa was the subject of a nationwide manhunt. She was going by the alias Shane Ivaroni, had already landed two jobs while running various scams, and—after traveling through multiple states including Arizona, Alabama, Louisiana, and Colorado, and even returning to her hometown of Brooksville, Florida—began hiding out in Destin with her daughter, Haylei (17). Fearful that law enforcement was closing in on her, Elisa and Haylei drove to Charleston, South Carolina, before Elisa had second thoughts and drove back to Destin. She confessed to Haylei, in the meantime, that she and Sarah Dutra had murdered Larry. On March 20, 2002, in Fort Walton Beach, Elisa dropped off Haylei—who called the police and gave a description of her mother's car and last known location out of fear that her mother was suicidal and going to harm herself—at an unknown location before ultimately turning herself into authorities.

== Confession ==
She was booked into the Hernando County jail awaiting extradition to California. While awaiting extradition, Elisa gave a full confession to law enforcement while in the custody of the Okaloosa County Sheriff. Elisa told her defense attorney that she murdered her husband because he was physically abusive, and that because of her outstanding arrest warrants in Florida, she couldn't report him to the authorities or leave him. Her 16-year-old son, Cole, visited her in jail—their first reunion in over nine years. One week later, on Easter Sunday 2002, Elisa hanged herself in her jail cell.

== Trial of Sarah Dutra ==
Sarah Dutra went on trial for the murder of Larry McNabney in 2003. She faced life imprisonment without parole if convicted of first-degree murder, but she was instead found guilty of voluntary manslaughter and being an accessory to murder. She was sentenced to the maximum of 11 years, 8 months in prison.

== Aftermath ==
In Elisa McNabney's suicide note, she asked her lawyer to sue the Hernando County Jail for not preventing her suicide. She also asked that her children receive any funds raised from the lawsuit. "This is all I can give to my children... My actions now will allow them to move into the future without this heavy burden. They won't have to watch my trial on CourtTV. It should all die with me," she wrote in the note. She also claims that she was not checked regularly in her cell, but an investigation has since disputed the charge.

Sarah Dutra was released from the Central California Women's Facility on August 26, 2011, after serving eighty-five percent of her eleven-year sentence.

This case was the basis for the made-for-TV movie Lies My Mother Told Me which aired on Lifetime in 2005. The film starred Joely Richardson as Elisa, Kailin See as Sarah, and Hayden Panettiere as Haylei. The case was featured on the television program Dateline among others. The case is also the basis for the true-crime novel, Marked for Death by Brian J. Karem. In April 2022, Haylei Jordan-Kersey, speaking for the very first time, gave an interview to 20/20 outlining details of the case, her childhood, and her mother's turbulent marriage.
