= Lies My Mother Told Me =

- Television release poster
- Genre: Drama
- Written by: Matt Dorff
- Directed by: Christian Duguay
- Starring: Joely Richardson; Hayden Panettiere; Kailin See; Tim Henry; Colm Feore
- Music by: Normand Corbeil
- Country of origin: Canada
- Original language: English

Production
- Executive producer: Randy Robinson
- Producers: Chad Oakes; Michael Trislev
- Cinematography: Christian Duguay
- Editor: Sylvain Lebel
- Running time: 99 minutes
- Production companies: Nomadic Pictures; CD Films; Randwell Productions

Original release
- Network: Lifetime
- Release: March 7, 2005

Lies My Mother Told Me is a 2005 Canadian drama television film directed by Christian Duguay, written by Matt Dorff, and starring Joely Richardson, Hayden Panettiere, Kailin See, Tim Henry and Colm Feore. The film is loosely based on the true story of the murder of Larry McNabney by his wife, Elisa McNabney, with the help of college student Sarah Dutra. Elisa fled to Florida, where she was eventually caught. Two weeks later, she hanged herself in her jail cell while awaiting extradition to California.

The film aired on Lifetime in the United States on March 7, 2005. Duguay was nominated for the Gemini Award for Best Direction in a Dramatic Program or Mini-Series.

== Plot ==
In 1992, Laren Sims is a single mother living in Destin, North Carolina with her parents and young daughter Haylei. Outgoing and free-spirited, with a reputation of being a troublemaker and having sociopathic tendencies to shamelessly lie, cheat, and steal without any guilt about her actions, Laren cannot shake off her bad reputation or break free of her quick and easy life of crime. Unable to afford Christmas presents, she buys them with a stolen credit card. She is caught and sentenced to 90 days in a maximum security prison.

Some months later, Laren continues to get off on the "rush" of stealing. During a shopping outing at a local mall, Laren steals items from a clothing store when she takes her daughter with her to show her the art of stealing. Rather than return to prison when she is found stealing a second time, she goes on the run, but decides to take her daughter with her, unable to stand being apart from her. Laren steals a car with her daughter and travels to another town in Tennessee. There she steals another car from a used car lot when she leaves a stolen credit card with the dealer while allegedly taking it for a test drive. Mother and daughter work their way across the country, supporting themselves by passing bad checks and using stolen credit cards while frequently stealing license plates from other cars in order to escape detection from the authorities.

In 1995, Laren adopts the identity of a diner waitress she meets in rural Texas by stealing her driver's license out of her locker. She and Haylei ultimately arrive in Las Vegas, where Laren applies for a job with Lucas McKenzie, a wealthy alcoholic attorney and ranch owner, under the name of Allison. The two fall into a toxic co-dependent relationship and eventually get married a year later. Laren embezzles $90,000 from her husband's business account and he is subsequently disbarred for reasons not made clear.

In 2001, in an uncharacteristic moment of honesty, Laren reveals to Lucas where she is actually from and her past problems. Lucas uses this information to find out her actual name and her sordid past. From this point on, Lucas threatens to turn her in to the authorities if she refuses to cooperate with him in helping more of his shady business ventures. In a state of fear, Laren sends Haylei away to school and hires a college student named Kristin to help her with the horses on Lucas' ranch. The two become very close (although never specified, a lesbian relationship between them is implied), to the dismay of both Lucas and Haylei. As their relationship disintegrates and the possibility of discovery grows, Laren decides to poison her spouse with Kristin's assistance.

One evening, Laren approaches Lucas in his hotel room during a conference where she poisons him. Laren and Kristin then remove the body from the hotel and bury it under a bridge spanning a shallow creek, where it is eventually found.

Laren escapes with Haylei and leaves behind Kristin to shoulder the blame. Returning to Destin, she encourages her daughter to contact her grandparents and return to them, then surrenders to the police and eventually commits suicide by hanging herself in her jail cell.

== Cast ==
- Joely Richardson as Laren Sims (based on Elisa McNabney)
- Colm Feore as Lucas Mackenzie (based on Larry McNabney)
- Hayden Panettiere as Haylei Sims
- Jasmine Berg as Young Haylei Sims
- Tim Henry as Johnny
- Judith Buchan as Jenny
- Kailin See as Kristin (based on Sarah Dutra)
- Joe Norman Shaw as Edwards Samuels
- Kira Bradley as Tammy
- Stirling Karlsen as Jodie
- Barbara Gates Wilson as Detective Rayburn
- Marty Antonini as Guy
- Rita Bozi as Carolyn
- Carrie Schiffler as Roadside Diner Waitress
- Tom Carey as Jake

== Production ==
Principal photography took place from September 27 to October 29, 2004, in Calgary.

== Differences between the film and actual events ==
In real life, when charged as an accomplice in the murder of Larry McNabney, Sarah Dutra pleaded not guilty. Prosecutors decided not to pursue the death penalty, but if found guilty of first-degree murder, she faced life in prison without parole. Her trial lasted two months, and the jury reached a verdict in March 2003. She was convicted of voluntary manslaughter and sentenced to 11 years and 8 months.

- In the film, Laren buries Lucas under a bridge. In real life, she buried him in a vineyard.
- In the film, Larry McNabney's name was changed to Lucas Mckenzie. Sarah Dutra's first name is changed to Kristin, and her surname is not mentioned. Haylei's surname was changed as well.
- In the film, Haylei is said to be an only child, but in real life, she had a brother named Cole.
