= Jacky Ido =

Burkinabé-French actor

- Born: 14 May 1977 (age 49); Ouagadougou, Upper Volta
- Occupation: Actor
- Years active: 2004–present

Jacky Ido (born 14 May 1977) is a Burkinabe-French actor. His first role was as Lemalian in the 2005 German film, The White Masai. He is best known to English-language audiences for his role as Marcel, the film projectionist in Quentin Tarantino's 2009 film, Inglourious Basterds.

== Personal life and career ==
Ido's brother Cédric Ido, who is also an actor, has directed him in the short Hasaki Ya Suda. Ido works and resides in Paris, France and, as of 2010, is working on an album of slam poetry.

In 2014, Ido starred as Leo Romba in the short lived French-American television series Taxi Brooklyn. In 2015, he was cast opposite Mireille Enos in the ABC legal thriller, The Catch produced by Shonda Rhimes.

== Filmography ==
=== Film ===
Year	Title	Role	Notes
2005	The White Masai	Lemalian Mamutelil	
2006	Les Enfants du pays	Lamine	
2008	Aide-toi, le ciel t'aidera	Fer	
2009	Inglourious Basterds	Marcel	Screen Actors Guild Award for Outstanding Performance by a Cast in a Motion Picture; Critics' Choice Movie Award for Best Acting Ensemble; San Diego Film Critics Society Award for Best Performance by an Ensemble
2010	What War May Bring	Bob	
2012	Radiostars	Léonard de Vitry	
2012	Lockout	Hock	
2012	Django Unchained	Slave (uncredited)	
2012	The Adventures of Huck Finn	Jim	
2013	Aya de Yopougon	Ignace / Hervé / Moussa	Voice
2013	West	John Bird	
2014	Salaud, on t'aime	Jacky	
2014	In the Morning	Malik	
2017	Chateau	Charles	
2019	Scappo a casa	Mugambi	

=== Television ===
Year	Title	Role	Notes
2004	Laverie de famille	Football player	Episode: "Boulet de canon"
2005	Spiral	Person	Season 1, Episode 3
2007	Tropiques amers	Koyaba	Recurring role
2007	L'Hôpital	Intern	Episode: "Fragiles"
2007	Duval et Moretti	Walli	Episode: "César à deux doigts de la mort"
2014	Taxi Brooklyn	Leo Romba	
2016	The Catch	Jules Dao	
2019	The Widow	Emmanuel Kazadi	
2022	Le Flambeau, les aventuriers de Chupacabra	Jean Guy	
2023	Pamela Rose, la série	Lord Kimba	
2026	Ride or Die	Jacques	5 Episodes
