= Greg Schultz (producer) =

American film producer

- Occupation: Producer
- Website: haymakerprojects.com

Greg Schultz is a film, television, advertising and new media producer.

He is an Emmy Award winner, having produced 10 Days That Unexpectedly Changed America (Outstanding Nonfiction Series, 2006 Primetime Emmy Awards) and the pilot episode for Mad Men (Outstanding Drama Series, 2008 Primetime Emmy Awards).

== Filmography ==
- Mad Men - 2005
- Ten Days That Unexpectedly Changed America - 2005
- Iconoclasts - 2005
- The Exonerated - 2004
- Battlegrounds: Ball or Fall - 2003
- Parking Lot - 2003
- Report from Ground Zero - 2002
- The Life - 2001
