= Cédric Ido =

Burkinabe-French actor and director (born 1980)

- Born: 22 October 1980 (age 45); Stains, Seine-Saint-Denis, Paris, France
- Occupations: Writer, Director, Actor
- Years active: 2006–present

Cédric Ido (born 22 October 1980) is a Burkinabe-French director, writer and actor. He grew up in Stains, Seine-Saint-Denis, a small suburban town near Paris and in Ouagadougou, Burkina Faso during Thomas Sankara’s revolution. His directing works have been exhibited worldwide in film festivals such as Seattle, Dubai and Venice.

In 2015 he won the Africa Movie Academy Award for best short film with Twaaga, which takes place in Burkina Faso during Thomas Sankara's revolution. He has directed his brother, actor Jacky Ido, on a number of films including Chateau, and Hasaki Ya Suda.

== Filmography ==
Year	Film	Writer	Director	Notes
2009	Un 'Stains' de musique	✓	✓	Documentary
2011	Hasaki Ya Suda	✓	✓	Short film
2013	Twaaga	✓	✓	Short film
2017	Chateau	✓	✓	Feature film
2022	Oussekine	✗	✓	TV series
2022	The Gravity (La Gravité)	✓	✓	Feature film
