= Mirco Mencacci =

Italian composer

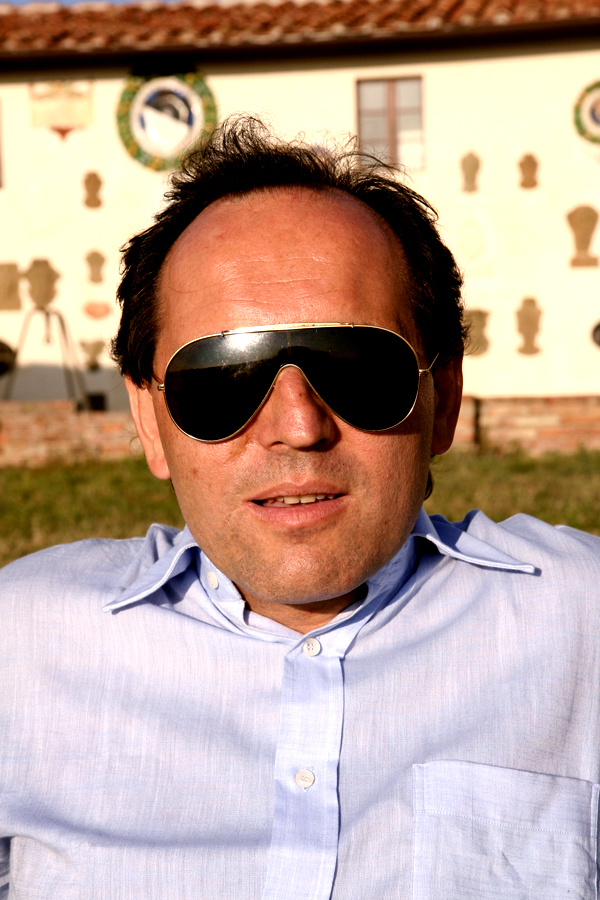
- Born: 1961 (age 64–65); Pontedera; Pisa, Tuscany, Italy
- Occupations: Sound designer; Inventor
- Years active: 1981–present
- Awards: Maxxi Award 2014; Special Jury Award at Locarno Cinema 2016
- Website: Official website

Mirco Mencacci (born 1961) is a prominent Italian sound designer who works with all aspects of sound, principally within film, art, and music.

In 1981, Mencacci founded the SAM recording-facility in Lari, Italy. The studio is also known for its independent record label, book production, film editing, and sound design. Since 2001, he has been fighting a personal battle against noise pollution, the second biggest pollutant in the world.

From 1996 to 2011, Mencacci relocated to Rome, where in 1999 he established a secondary arm of SAM studios, providing post-production services for cinema. In 2001 he also became a partner of Sound On Studios. During his time in Rome, Mencacci coordinated and supervised the post-production on over 400 films.

== Early life ==
Mencacci was born in Lari, Tuscany in Italy. At 4 years old, he was rendered blind due to a shotgun accident in his grandfather's garden. He moved in Genoa at the age of 7 to attend a school for boys who are blind or have low vision. Mencacci's story inspired the Italian autobiographical film Red like the Sky, directed Cristiano Bortone, 2002. The film illustrates the conditions in Italian schools for children with disabilities in the 1970s.

The film won 19 critic and festival awards, including audience awards at the São Paulo International Film Festival and Sydney Film Festival. It also won a David di Donatello Award from the Accademia del Cinema Italiano.

== Cinema ==
Mencacci has crafted sound design for international films that have screened in over one hundred film festivals across the world. His work has also featured and been exhibited at the Guggenheim in New York City, MOMA, Pompidou in Paris, MAXXI Museum in Rome, and the Venice Biennale with films including Michelangelo's Eye to Eye by Michelangelo Antonioni, Puccini and the Girl by Paolo Benvenuti.

He has frequently collaborated with director Yuri Ancarani, on films including, The Challenge for which Mencacci received the special Jury Award at Locarno Cinema, San Siro which won the Maxxi Award in 2014 and the Sky Arts award in 2014. Mencacci also worked on the trilogy composed by Il Capo which in 2010 screened at the Venice Film Festival, Piattaforma Luna which premiered at the Rome Film Festival in 2011, and the film Da Vinci from the Venice Biennale in 2013.

Mencacci has worked prolifically on films that have screened internationally at film festivals such as the Venice Film Festival, the San Francisco International Film Festival, Eye Honors New York, the Milwaukee Film Festival, and the Hamburg International Short Film Festival.

Mencacci is the inventor of the Spherical Sound System, which he uses in his cinematographic works. In 2016 he was invited by Dolby to the Casa del Cinema in Rome in to demonstrate his system to audiences and how it applied to the newly launched Dolby Atmos system.

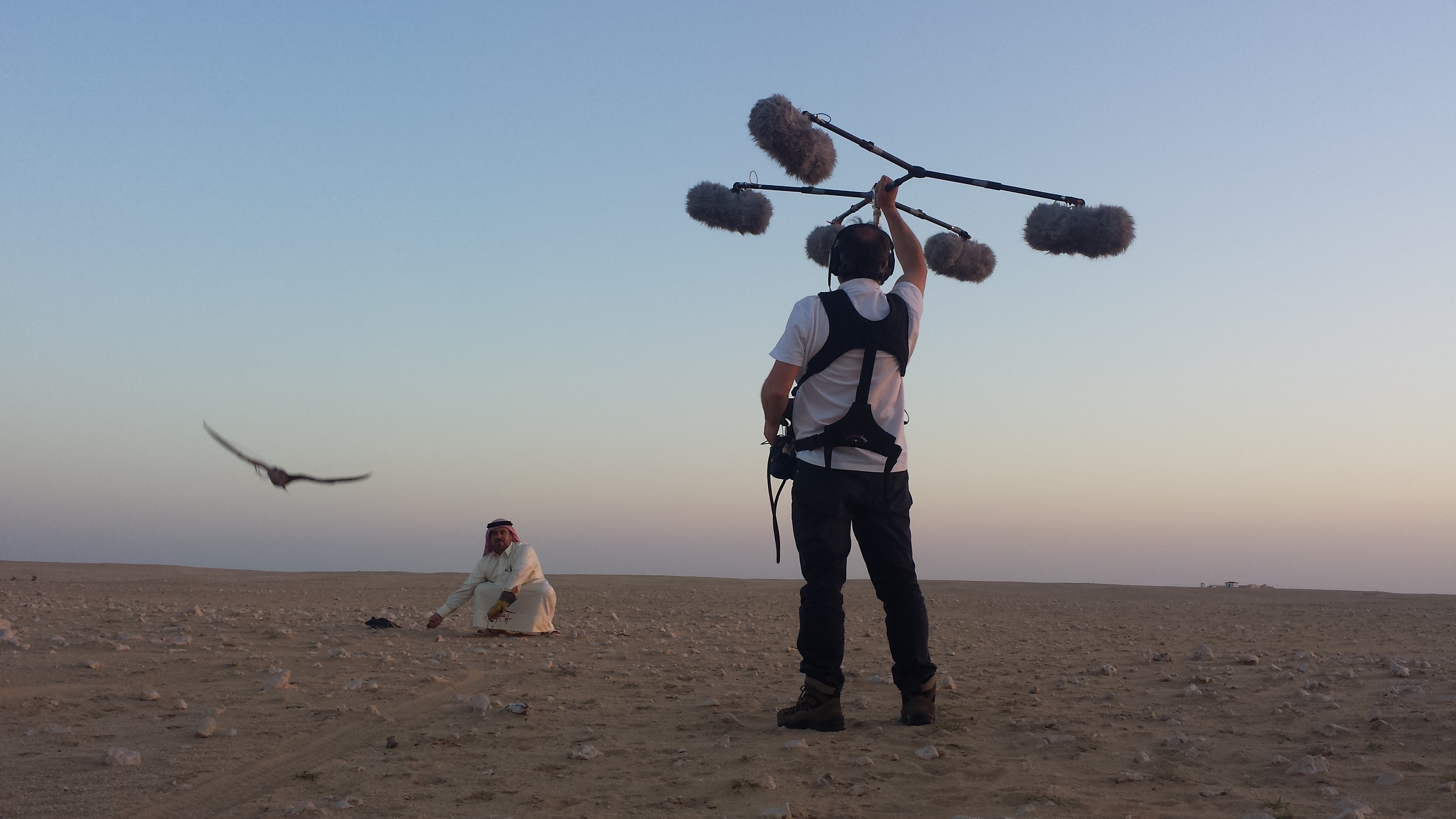
Mirco Mencacci during the shooting of the film The Challenge in Qatar

== Filmography ==
Year	Title	Role	Director
2001	The Ignorant Fairies	Sound Supervisor	Ferzan Özpetek
2002	The Embalmer	Sound Supervisor	Matteo Garrone
2003	The Best of Youth	Sound Supervisor	Marco Tullio Giordana
2004	Michelangelo Eye to Eye	Sound Designer	Michelangelo Antonioni
2004	First Love	Sound Supervisor	Matteo Garrone
2006	Fascists on Mars	Sound Designer	Corrado Guzzanti
2008	Puccini and the Girl	Sound Designer	Paolo Benvenuti
2010	Il Capo	Sound Designer	Yuri Ancarani
2011	Piattaforma Luna	Sound Designer	Yuri Ancarani
2013	Da Vinci	Sound Designer	Yuri Ancarani
2013	Nato prematuro	Sound Designer	Enzo Cei
2014	San Siro	Sound Designer	Yuri Ancarani
2014	Séance	Sound Designer	Yuri Ancarani
2015	Il Rifugio	Sound Designer	Guy Masseaux
2015	The Colour of Grass	Sound Designer	Juliane Biasi
2016	The Challenge	Sound Designer	Yuri Ancarani
2015	The Sounds of Massimo Bottura’s Lasagna	Co-director & Sound Designer	Yuri Ancarani & Mirco Mencacci
2017	Whipping Zombie	Sound Designer	Yuri Ancarani
2018	The Dark Wood	Sound Designer	Guy Masseaux
2018	San Vittore	Sound Designer	Yuri Ancarani

== Music ==
Mencacci is a prolific music producer and recording engineer across multi genres and international artists. He has been involved in the recording of jazz, classical, pop and experimental music from artists including Benson Taylor, Blonde Redhead, Playing for Change, Luke Winslow-King, Niia, Stefano Bollani, Anthony Sidney, Mauro Refosco, Tony Scott, Sportfreunde Stiller, Irio de Paula, Nguyên Lê, Kazu Makino, Ornella Vanoni, Nada Marina Rei, Il Teatro degli Orrori, Paolo Fresu, Enrico Rava, Bruno Tommaso, Nada, Stewart Copeland, Giovanni Caccamo, Riki (Riccardo Marcuzzo), Zen Circus, Bandabardò, One Dimensional Man, Tooth, Emma Morton, Thegiornalisti, Mauro Ermanno Giovanardi, and many others.

== Career ==
Mencacci regularly hold master classes on sound in cinema across Europe and at international educational institutions including universities & film festivals. In 2009 he travelled to the United States to provide a lectures in sound design for cinema at Syracuse University.

He participated as a speaker on the experimentation of Spherical Sound, and the system of sound recording at Artevisione with Sky and Careof in Milan in 2016, Centro Professione Musica at CPM in Milan, and the Cinekid festival in Amsterdam in 2016, Festival du film de Beauvais in Paris in 2012, Ear to the Earth in New York City in 2006. In 2006, he was a member of the Grand Jury for the Festival International du Film d'Aubagne.

Mencacci has given many interviews and special appearance talks throughout his career, including being the special guest of RAI Uno TG1 news, La vita in diretta, in 2016, an interview for TG1 Persone by Angelo Angelastro in 2014, and many others. He participated in the 90th anniversary celebrations of the Italian Blind Union as a blind person who is distinguished in prestigious activities.
