= The White Masai (film) =

- The German theatrical poster
- Directed by: Hermine Huntgeburth
- Written by: Johannes W. Betz; Hermine Huntgeburth (adaptation); Günter Rohrbach (adaptation); Ruth Toma (narrator's script)
- Based on: The White Masai by Corinne Hofmann
- Produced by: Günter Rohrbach
- Starring: Nina Hoss; Jacky Ido
- Cinematography: Martin Langer
- Edited by: Eva Schnare
- Music by: Niki Reiser
- Distributed by: Constantin Film
- Release dates: September 14, 2005 (TIFF); September 15, 2005 (Germany)
- Running time: 131 minutes
- Country: Germany
- Languages: English; German; Swahili; Maa

The White Masai (German: Die weiße Massai) is a 2005 film directed by Hermine Huntgeburth and starring Nina Hoss and Jacky Ido. The screenplay concerns Carola, a woman who falls in love in Kenya with Maasai Lemalian. The film is based on an autobiographical novel of the same name by the German born writer Corinne Hofmann. In the film version, names have been changed from those in the novel.

== Plot ==
Carola (Hoss), a German woman living in Switzerland, is on holiday with her boyfriend in Kenya. She falls in love with Maasai warrior Lemalian (Ido), who is visiting dressed in the clothing of his area. At the airport on the way home she decides to stay. It turns out that Lemalian has gone to his home village in the Samburu District. Carola travels to the area, and stays at the house of another German woman who married a Kenyan man. Lemalian hears about her stay and comes to meet her. Eventually they start living together.

She travels to Switzerland to sell her shop there, promising Lemalian to come back to him. She does, and they marry and have a daughter named Sarai. Carola buys a car and starts a shop. They lose money on the shop because Lemalian gives too much credit to friends and neighbors, and because they have to pay bribes to the mini-chief. Lemalian argues that this is no problem because she has more money in Switzerland.

The mini-chief demands that Carola hires his teenage nephew as a shop assistant. She has to accept this although she does not need him and he does not work hard. After some time, when he is just drinking beer and not working, she fires him. Later he returns and attacks her. A local judge rules that she has to pay two goats for firing him, but the boy's family has to pay her five goats to compensate for the attack.

Carola is frustrated by the female circumcision being practiced in the village. She wants to stop it, but it is a long tradition that is not easily changed.

When Carola helps a pregnant woman in labour with a breech birth, Lemalian refuses to assist because the woman is supposedly bewitched.

Lemalian does not want Carola to be friendly with other men, even if she is just serving a customer in a friendly way. He is very jealous and suspicious of Carola having a boyfriend. He even wants to kill a man he suspects.

Carola wants to return to Switzerland with Sarai, stating she needs a two-week holiday. After some hesitation, Lemalian signs a form giving Carola consent to take the girl out of Kenya, although he suspects that she will not return.
