= The White Masai (novel) =

1998 memoir by Corinne Hofmann

- Cover of the book
- Author: Corinne Hofmann
- Original title: Die weiße Massai
- Translator: Peter Millar
- Language: English
- Set in: Kenya
- Publisher: HarperCollins
- Publication date: 1998
- Publication place: Switzerland
- English publication date: 2005
- Pages: 307
- ISBN: 9780061131523

The White Masai (originally published in German as Die weiße Massai) is a memoir by Corinne Hofmann about the years she spent in Kenya. It was published in German in 1998 and translated into English in 2005. A film adaptation was released in 2005.

In 2013, the book was being translated into Chinese.

== Plot ==
The memoir tells the story of Corinne's trip from her home country of Switzerland to Kenya, as a tourist in the company of her fiancé Marco. While at the ferry, she sees and falls in love with Lketinga, a Maasai warrior. Before their vacation is over she makes a decision that she would go to Switzerland, sell her dressmaking business and get back to Kenya to live with her "new found love". This is in spite of the fact that she has not told Lketinga of her plans. She breaks up with Marco and once they get back to Switzerland, she moves out of the apartment she had been sharing with her fiancé as she prepares to get back to Kenya.

Over the course of the book, she travels around Kenya, as well as back to Switzerland. In Kenya, she suffered hardships like poor living conditions, tropical diseases, and nearly losing her pregnancy, but persisted. She marries Lketinga amidst many challenges and they have a child and they name her Napirai.

Their marriage is a rocky one. Increasingly paranoid jealousy from her husband, possibly a side effect of his addiction to the drug khat (miraa), severely damaged her relationship. She sets up a shop in Barsaloi, but it fails. She then sets up a tourist shop in Ukunda which becomes a success. Her husband's fits of jealousy make her feel insecure, and eventually she flees Kenya with her daughter and returns to Switzerland.
