= Kerry Max Cook =

American former Death Row inmate

Kerry Max Cook (born 1956) is an American former death row inmate who was wrongfully convicted and sentenced to death for the rape and murder of 21-year-old Linda Jo Edwards in 1977. On June 19, 2024, the Texas Criminal Court of Appeals determined that he was actually innocent, citing a litany of prosecutorial misconduct and errors.

== Biography ==
Kerry Max Cook was born in Stuttgart, West Germany, and moved to Texas with his family in 1972. He served over 20 years in a Texas prison on death row. Since his release, he has become an activist against the death penalty, speaking across the United States and in Europe.

Cook wrote Chasing Justice, which was published by HarperCollins in 2008, that details his conviction, the widespread prosecutorial abuses which led to it, and the battle to prove his innocence. Chasing Justice was nominated for the Edgar Award by Mystery Writers of America. He was awarded a Soros Justice Fellowship to write the book. In an advance blurb for the memoir, former FBI Director and Federal Judge William S. Sessions noted, "Kerry Max Cook has written a brutal but compelling account of his 22 years on Texas’s death row for a murder he did not commit. The book depicts his struggles against all odds to free himself from an inept justice system that would not let go, despite mounting and eventually overwhelming evidence of his innocence. What is perhaps most amazing is the grace with which he now lives his life as a free man, determined to prevent others from suffering the horrors he endured."

Cook is one of six people whose stories were dramatized in the play The Exonerated by Eric Jensen and Jessica Blank. This details how each individual was convicted of murder and sentenced to death, in addition to their exoneration after varying years of imprisonment. Cook often personally participates in the play. The Exonerated has been made into a film, which first aired on the CourtTV cable television station on January 27, 2005. Kerry Cook is portrayed by Aidan Quinn in the film. At the end the film fades from the actor to Cook himself who talks about his experience, his family and his book writing.

Cook and his lawyer Marc McPeak filed a motion to perform DNA tests on physical evidence found at the murder scene. McPeak also filed a motion to recuse Judge Jack Skeen, the former district attorney who prosecuted Cook's first two trials, as Skeen would be the one to hear the DNA-testing motion. On April 9, 2012, Administrative Judge John Ovard of Dallas granted Cook's request for DNA testing but denied his plea to move the case out of Smith County, where prosecutors who originally tried his case were found by the Texas Court of Criminal Appeals to have committed "egregious prosecutorial misconduct." Cook's battle to clear his name has been taken up by the online petition site Change.org.

On June 6, 2016, prosecutors agreed to drop the charges against Kerry Max Cook; this was motivated in part by James Mayfield's admission that he had lied about not having sex with the victim for weeks.

A hearing on whether Cook was actually innocent was scheduled for July 1, 2016.

On June 7, 2016, Cook fired the lawyers who had gotten the charges dropped. On June 19, 2016, he found a new lawyer, Mark Bennett, from Houston. Twelve days later, in the actual-innocence hearing before Judge Jack Carter, Bennett argued that there was clear evidence that Mayfield had committed the murder.

On July 25, 2016, Judge Carter made findings of fact, concluding "that a reasonable jury would not necessarily acquit Cook after hearing both new exculpatory evidence and the previous evidence of guilt." On June 19, 2024, Cook was officially declared innocent by the Texas Court of Criminal Appeals, 46 years after his journey through the Texas justice system began.

On November 14, 2024, Cook filed a lawsuit against the City of Tyler, Smith County, and multiple current and former law enforcement officials over "violations of due process, malicious prosecution, destruction of evidence, and conspiracy" relating to his conviction

== See also ==
- List of wrongful convictions in the United States
