= Corinne Hofmann =

Swiss author (born 1960)

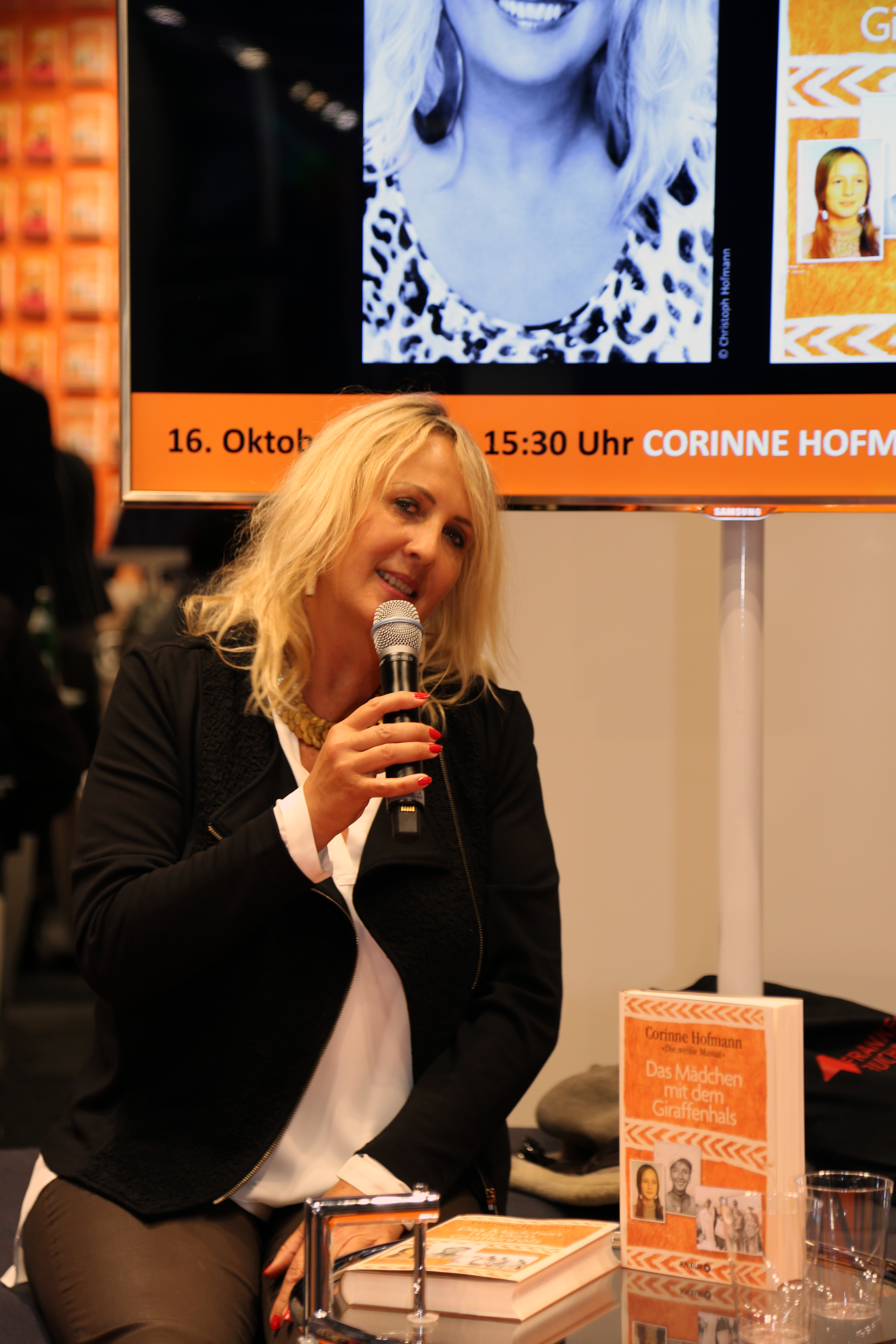
Hofmann in 2015

Corinne Hofmann (born 4 June 1960) is a German born author living in Switzerland, most famous for her multi-million selling memoir Die weisse Massai (The White Masai).

== Biography ==
Born on 4 June 1960 to a German father and a French mother, Corinne studied in the canton of Glarus and eventually went into the retail trade. At the age of twenty-one, she opened her own clothing store.

In 1986, Hofmann and her boyfriend Marco made a trip to Kenya. There, she met a Samburu warrior named Lketinga Leparmorijo and instantly found him irresistible. She left Marco, went back to Switzerland to sell her possessions, and, in 1987, returned to Kenya, determined to find Lketinga, which she eventually did. The couple moved in together, married, and had a daughter. The Samburu are a pastoralist people related to the Maasai, and live in small villages in an arid area of central Kenya. Hofmann moved into her mother-in-law's manyatta (compound) and learned to live as a Samburu woman, fetching wood and water. She opened a small shop in the village, to sell basic goods.

Hofmann suffered several hardships, including diseases (mainly malaria) and marital problems. Increasingly paranoid jealousy from her husband, possibly a side effect of his addiction to the drug khat (miraa), severely damaged her relationship, and in 1990 she decided to return to Switzerland for good, taking their daughter with her. Later on, she wrote a book about her experiences. The book, titled Die weisse Massai, became a phenomenal success. It has been translated into several languages, and in 2005, made into an eponymous movie starring Nina Hoss and Jacky Ido.

Hofmann has since written four other books, three of which, Zurück aus Afrika (Back from Africa), Wiedersehen in Barsaloi (Reunion in Barsaloi) and Afrika, meine Passion (Africa, my passion), are sequels to the first book. She returned to visit her Samburu family for the first time in 2004. Another visit followed, this time in the company of the daughter she had with Lketinga. The reunion is described in Afrika, meine Passion.

Her most recent book, "Das Mädchen mit dem Giraffenhals" is the story of her childhood in the Swiss province and how she became the woman that she is today, or was at the time she first went to Kenya.

== See also ==
- The White Masai, the film

== Bibliography ==
- The White Masai (Die weiße Massai, 1998).
- Back from Africa (Zurück aus Afrika, 2003).
- Reunion in Barsaloi (Wiedersehen in Barsaloi, 2005).
- Africa, my passion (Afrika, meine Passion, 2011).
