= Quincy Five =

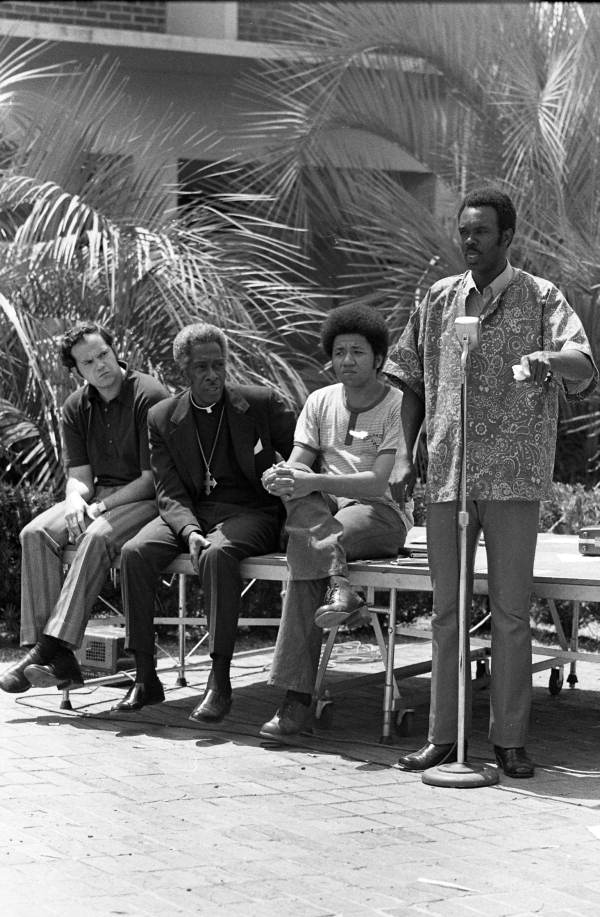
Rally in defense of the Quincy Five. Seated (L–R): ?, Father David Brooks, Charles Steele – son of Rev. C. K. Steele and organizer of the Defense of the Quincy Five

The Quincy Five were a group of five young African American men from Quincy, Florida who were charged with the 1970 murder of a Leon County deputy sheriff. The men – Johnny Lee Burns, Alphonso Figgers, Johnny Frederick, Dave Roby Keaton Jr. and David Charles Smith Jr. – were convicted on May 6, 1971. All were sentenced to death or given life sentences. They were exonerated and pardoned in 1972 after many months of deliberation.

1974 saw the publication of the book David Charles: The Story of the Quincy Five, authored by Jeffrey Lickson. It included extensive material based on prison interviews with Smith, which focused on his upbringing and experiences as a musician and as a soldier in the Vietnam War. At the time, Smith was serving a Florida prison sentence for setting a bomb at an electrical station in North Florida. He was subsequently sentenced on Federal gun charges and released from Federal Prison on May 28, 1992.

Quincy takes time during their Juneteenth celebration to recognize the Quincy 5. Shortly after sentencing, three men from Jacksonville were arrested and convicted of the murder. In 2003 Keaton created a group called "Witnesses to Innocence". This group went around and spoke out against the death penalty. Now thanks in part to the contributions made by these members, over 154 wrongly accused death row inmates have been pardoned. Some time after being exonerated, Dave Keaton died in 2015. Johnny Burns made headlines by remarking on the city's tragic loss of their Family Dollar store which, after standing over 50 years, burned in an accidental fire in 2016. Local hero Jill President was praised for saving 6 kids during the fire. Neither the store nor the funcade next door were restored. Alphonso Figgers, cousin of Keaton who was a star athlete at the time of convictions, died in 2017. The story of the Quincy Five is also preserved at the local library

== See also ==
- List of wrongful convictions in the United States
