= List of Italian films of 1994 =

A list of films produced in Italy in 1994 (see 1994 in film):

Title	Director	Cast	Genre	Notes
1994
Barnabo of the Mountains	Mario Brenta	Marco Pauletti	drama	Entered into the 1994 Cannes Film Festival
La bella vita	Paolo Virzì	Claudio Bigagli, Sabrina Ferilli, Massimo Ghini	comedy	Entered into the 51st Venice International Film Festival
Belle al Bar	Alessandro Benvenuti	Alessandro Benvenuti, Eva Robin's, Assumpta Serna	comedy	Nastro d'Argento for best script
Il branco	Marco Risi	Luca Zingaretti, Ricky Memphis, Giorgio Tirabassi	crime-drama	Entered into the 51st Venice International Film Festival
The Butterfly's Dream	Marco Bellocchio	Simona Cavallari	drama	Screened at the 1994 Cannes Film Festival
Cemetery Man (Dellamorte Dellamore)	Michele Soavi	Rupert Everett, Anna Falchi	horror	
Con gli occhi chiusi	Francesca Archibugi	Debora Caprioglio, Marco Messeri, Stefania Sandrelli	drama	
Dear Goddamned Friends	Mario Monicelli	Paolo Villaggio, Antonella Ponziani, Massimo Ceccherini	comedy	Entered into the 44th Berlin International Film Festival
Delitto passionale	Flavio Mogherini	Serena Grandi, Fabio Testi, Florinda Bolkan	thriller	
Dichiarazioni d'amore	Pupi Avati	Carlo Delle Piane, Delia Boccardo	drama	
Farinelli	Gérard Corbiau	Stefano Dionisi, Enrico Lo Verso	Biopic	
Father and Son	Pasquale Pozzessere	Michele Placido, Stefano Dionisi	drama	
Genesis: The Creation and the Flood	Ermanno Olmi	Omero Antonutti	religious	TV-movie
Lamerica	Gianni Amelio	Enrico Lo Verso, Michele Placido	Drama	European Film Awards. 3 David di Donatello. 2 Nastro d'Argento. Venice Awards. Goya Awards
Law of Courage	Alessandro Di Robilant	Giulio Scarpati, Sabrina Ferilli, Leopoldo Trieste	crime-drama	Entered into the 44th Berlin International Film Festival
Like Two Crocodiles (Come due coccodrilli)	Giacomo Campiotti	Fabrizio Bentivoglio, Giancarlo Giannini, Valeria Golino	Drama	Golden Globe Nominee.
Love Burns	Davide Ferrario	Giuseppe Cederna, Elena Sofia Ricci	Comedy	
Maniaci sentimentali	Simona Izzo	Ricky Tognazzi, Barbara De Rossi, Alessandro Benvenuti	Comedy	
The Monster	Roberto Benigni	Roberto Benigni, Nicoletta Braschi, Michel Blanc	Comedy	Blockbuster
Nefertiti, figlia del sole	Guy Gilles	Michela Rocco di Torrepadula, Ben Gazzara	drama	
No Skin (Senza pelle)	Alessandro D'Alatri	Kim Rossi Stuart, Anna Galiena, Massimo Ghini	Drama	
Oasi	Cristiano Bortone	Henry Arnold, Valentina Cervi	romance	
Once a Year, Every Year	Gianfrancesco Lazotti	Giorgio Albertazzi, Lando Buzzanca, Vittorio Gassman, Giovanna Ralli	comedy	
Il Postino	Michael Radford	Massimo Troisi, Philippe Noiret, Maria Grazia Cucinotta	Drama	5 Academy Award nominations
A Pure Formality	Giuseppe Tornatore	Gérard Depardieu, Roman Polanski, Sergio Rubini	thriller	Entered into the 1994 Cannes Film Festival
Seven Sundays	Jean-Charles Tacchella	Thierry Lhermitte, Maurizio Nichetti, Rod Steiger, Molly Ringwald	Comedy	
The Silence of the Hams	Ezio Greggio	Ezio Greggio, Dom DeLuise, Billy Zane	Comedy	
S.P.Q.R.: 2,000 and a Half Years Ago	Carlo Vanzina	Christian De Sica, Massimo Boldi	Comedy	
Take Me Away	Gianluca Maria Tavarelli	Stefania Orsola Garello	romance	
Il toro	Carlo Mazzacurati	Diego Abatantuono, Marco Messeri, Roberto Citran	comedy-drama	Volpi Cup at the 51st Venice International Film Festival
The True Life of Antonio H.	Enzo Monteleone	Alessandro Haber, Giuliana De Sio, Bernardo Bertolucci	mockumentary	
The Voyeur	Tinto Brass	Katarzyna Kozaczyk	erotic	
The Whores	Aurelio Grimaldi	Ida Di Benedetto	drama	Entered into the 1994 Cannes Film Festival

== See also ==
- 1994 in Italian television
