= 51st Venice International Film Festival =

Italian film festival in 1994

- Festival poster
- Location: Venice, Italy
- Founded: 1932
- Awards: Golden Lion: Before the Rain; Vive L'Amour
- Festival date: 1 – 12 September 1994
- Website: Website

Venice Film Festival chronology
- 52nd 50th

The 51st annual Venice International Film Festival was held on 1 September to 12 September, 1994.

American filmmaker David Lynch was the Jury President of the main competition. The Golden Lion winners were Before the Rain directed by Milcho Manchevski and Vive L'Amour directed by Tsai Ming-liang.

== Jury ==
=== Main Competition ===
The following people comprised the 1994 jury:

- David Lynch, American filmmaker, actor, music and visual artist
- Olivier Assayas, French filmmaker and film critic
- Margherita Buy, Italian actress
- Gaston Kaboré, Burkinabé filmmaker
- Mario Vargas Llosa, Peruvian writer
- Nagisa Oshima, Japanese filmmaker
- David Stratton, English-Australian film critic
- Uma Thurman, American actress
- Carlo Verdone, Italian actor and filmmaker

== Official Sections ==
The following films were selected to be screened:

=== In Competition ===
| English title | Original title | Director(s) | Production country |
|---|---|---|---|
| 6 Days, 6 Nights | À la folie | Diane Kurys | France |
| Ashes of Time | 東邪西毒 | Wong Kar-Wai | Hong Kong, China |
| Before the Rain | Пред дождот | Milcho Manchevski | Macedonia. France, United Kingdom |
| The Bull | Il toro | Carlo Mazzacurati | Italy |
| The Heart's Cry | Le cri du coeur | Idrissa Ouedraogo | Burkina Faso, France |
| Heavenly Creatures | | Peter Jackson | New Zealand |
| In the Heat of the Sun | 陽光燦爛的日子 | Jiang Wen | China |
| Lamerica | | Gianni Amelio | Italy, France, Switzerland, Austria |
| Life and Extraordinary Adventures of Private Ivan Chonkin | Жизнь и необыча́йные приключе́ния солда́та Ива́на Чо́нкина | Jiří Menzel | Russia, Czech Republic, France, United Kingdom, Italy |
| Little Odessa | | James Gray | United States |
| Magic Hunter | Büvös vadász | Ildikó Enyedi | Hungary, France, Switzerland |
| Natural Born Killers | | Oliver Stone | United States |
| Il branco | | Marco Risi | Italy |
| Pigalle | | Karim Dridi | France |
| A Shadow You Soon Will Be | Una sombra ya pronto serás | Héctor Olivera | Argentina |
| Somebody to Love | | Alexandre Rockwell | United States |
| The Tit and the Moon | La Teta y la luna | Bigas Luna | Spain |
| Two Brothers, My Sister | Três Irmãos | Teresa Villaverde | Portugal |
| Vive L'Amour | 愛情萬歲 | Tsai Ming-liang | Taiwan |

=== Out of competition ===
| English title | Original title | Director(s) | Production country |
|---|---|---|---|
| Bullets Over Broadway | | Woody Allen | United States |
| Declarations of Love | Dichiarazioni d'amore | Pupi Avati | Italy |
| Genesis: The Creation and the Flood | Genesi: La creazione e il diluvio | Ermanno Olmi | Italy, Germany |
| Oasi | | Cristiano Bortone | Italy |
| Il Postino: The Postman | Il postino | Michael Radford | Italy, France |
| Staggered | | Martin Clunes | United Kingdom |
| Tom & Viv | | Brian Gilbert | United Kingdom |

=== Special events ===
| English title | Original title | Director(s) | Production country |
|---|---|---|---|
| Amnesia | | Gonzalo Justiniano | Chile |
| Eagles Don't Hunt Flies | Águilas no cazan moscas | Sergio Cabrera | Colombia |
| Jason's Lyric | | Doug McHenry | United States |
| Motel Eden | El jardín del edén | María Novaro | Mexico |
| The Peacocks | I pavoni | Luciano Manuzzi | Italy |
| Rio's Love Song | Veja Esta Canção | Carlos Diegues | Brazil |
| You Drive Me Crazy | Du bringst mich noch um | Wolfram Paulus | Austria |
| Words Upon the Window Pane | | Mary McGuckian | Ireland |
Tribute to Jacques Doillon
| Du fond du coeur | | Jacques Doillon | France |

=== Window on Images ===
| English title | Original title | Director(s) | Production country |
|---|---|---|---|
| Die Stimme des Igels | | Jochen Kuhn | Germany |
| Enastros tholos | | Kostas Aristopoulos | Greece |
| Everynight ... Everynight | | Alkinos Tsilimidos | Australia |
| The Kingdom | Riget | Lars von Trier, Morten Arnfred | Denmark |
| Limita | | Denis Evstigneev | Russia |
| Loaded | | Anna Campion | United Kingdom |
| Mil e Uma | | Suzana de Moraes | Brazil |
| Oublie-moi | | Noémie Lvovsky | France |
| S.F.W. | | Jefery Levy | United States |
| Once Were Warriors | | Lee Tamahori | New Zealand |
| Tsahal | | Claude Lanzmann | France |
| Uno a me, uno a te e uno a Raffaele | | Jon Jost | Germany |
| Vanya on 42nd Street | | Louis Malle | United States |
| Weird Tales | Strane storie | Sandro Baldoni | Italy |
Medium-length films
| Arisha, the Bear and the Stone Ring | Arisha, der Bär und der steinerne Ring | Wim Wenders | France |
| Only the Brave | | Ana Kokkinos | Australia |
| Voilà | | Bruno Podalydès | France |
| Paradjanov: A Requiem | | Ron Holloway | United States |

=== Venetian Nights ===
| English title | Original title | Director(s) | Production country |
|---|---|---|---|
| 47 Ronin | | Kon Ichikawa | Japan |
| Captives | | Angela Pope | United Kingdom |
| Clear and Present Danger | | Phillip Noyce | United States |
| Forrest Gump | | Robert Zemeckis | United States |
| Love and Human Remains | | Denys Arcand | Canada |
| Metal Skin | | Geoffrey Wright | Australia |
| The Night and the Moment | | Anna Maria Tatò | France, United Kingdom, Italy |
| The Nightmare Before Christmas | | Henry Selick | United States |
| True Lies | | James Cameron | United States |
| Wolf | | Mike Nichols | United States |
| Woodstock 25th Anniversary Director' s Cut | | Michael Wadleigh | United States |

=== Italian panorama ===
| English title | Original title | Director(s) | Production country |
|---|---|---|---|
| Anni Ribelli | | Rosalia Polizzi | Italy, Argentina |
| Da qualche parte in città | | Michele Sordillo | Italy |
| Ladri di cinema | | Piero Natoli | Italy |
| Love Burns | Anime fiammeggianti | Davide Ferrario | Italy |
| Once a Year, Every Year | Tutti gli anni una volta l'anno | Gianfrancesco Lazotti | Italy, France, Belgium |
| Take Me Away | Portami via | Gianluca Maria Tavarelli | Italy |
| The True Life of Antonio H. | La vera vita di Antonio H. | Enzo Monteleone | Italy |

== Independent Sections ==
=== Venice International Film Critics' Week ===
The following feature films were selected to be screened as In Competition for this section:

| English title | Original title | Director(s) | Production country |
|---|---|---|---|
| Accumulator 1 | Akumulátor 1 | Jan Svěrák | Czech Republic |
| Cracking Up | | Matt Mitler | United States |
| Don’t Get Me Started | | Arthur Ellis | United Kingdom |
| Frankie, Jonny & die anderen | | Hans-Erich Viet | Germany |
| Ilayum Mullum | | K.P. Sasi | India |
| Iron Horsemen | | Gilles Charmant | France |
| Passé-Composé | | Françoise Romand | France, Tunisia |
| The Road to Paradise | Doroga V Ray | Vitaly Moskalenko | Russia |
| That Eye, the Sky | | John Ruane | Australia |

== Official Awards ==
=== Main Competition ===
- Golden Lion:
  - Before the Rain by Milčo Mančevski
  - Vive L'Amour by Tsai Ming-liang
- Silver Lion:
  - Heavenly Creatures by Peter Jackson
  - Little Odessa by James Gray
  - The Bull by Carlo Mazzacurati
- Grand Special Jury Prize: Natural Born Killers by Oliver Stone
- Golden Osella:
  - Best Director: Gianni Amelio for Lamerica
  - Best Screenplay: Bigas Luna, Cuca Canals for La teta y la luna
  - Best Cinematography: Christopher Doyle for Ashes of Time
- Volpi Cup for Best Actor: Xia Yu for In the Heat of the Sun
  - Best Supporting Actor: Roberto Citran for The Bull
- Volpi Cup for Best Actress: Maria de Medeiros for Três Irmãos
  - Best Supporting Actress: Vanessa Redgrave for Little Odessa

=== Career Golden Lion ===
- Al Pacino
- Suso Cecchi d'Amico
- Ken Loach

== Independent Awards ==
=== The President of the Italian Senate's Gold Medal ===
- Život a neobyčejná dobrodružství vojáka Ivana Čonkina by Jiří Menzel

=== Golden Ciak ===
- Living It Up by Paolo Virzì

=== FIPRESCI Prize ===
- Before the Rain by Milčo Mančevski
- Vive L'Amour by Tsai Ming-liang

=== OCIC Award ===
- Lamerica by Gianni Amelio
