= Anita Kravos =

Italian actress

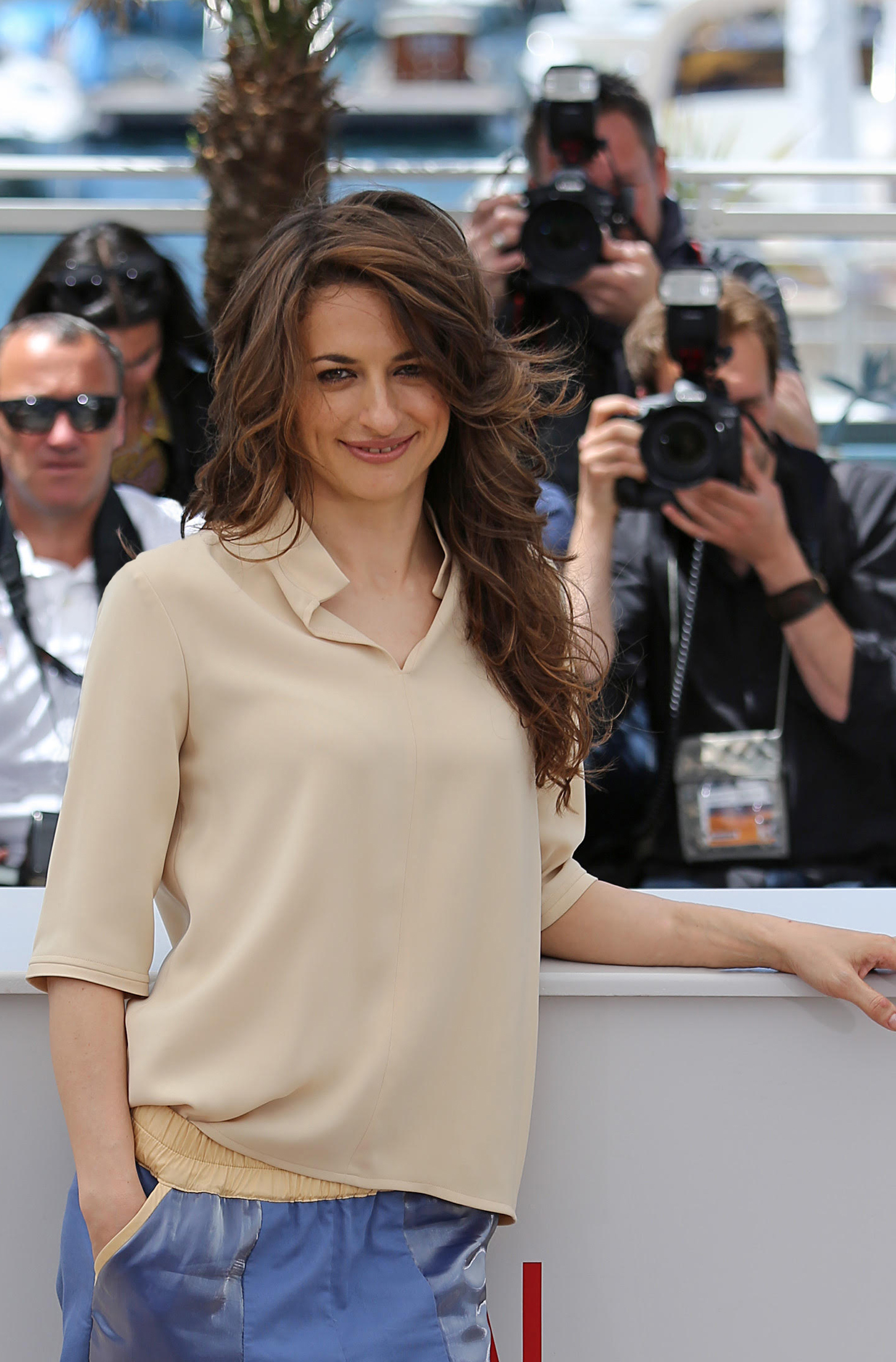
- Kravos at the 2013 Cannes Film Festival
- Born: 2 April 1974 (age 51); Trieste, Italy
- Occupation: Actress

Anita Kravos (born 2 April 1974) is an Italian actress. Her acting credits include Raise Your Head and The Great Beauty.

In 2010 she has been nominated to the David di Donatello for Best Supporting Actress thanks to her performance in Raise Your Head.

== Filmography ==
- A Woman's Name directed by Marco Tullio Giordana (2018)
- Ritratto di un imprenditore di provincia directed by Hermes Cavagnini (2015)
- Seconda primavera directed by Francesco Calogero (director) (2015)
- La accabadora directed by Enrico Pau (2015)
- La vita oscena, directed by Renato De Maria (2014)
- Fuori mira directed by Erik Bernasconi (2014)
- The Great Beauty directed by Paolo Sorrentino (2013)
- Amori elementari directed by Sergio Basso (2013)
- Se chiudo gli occhi non sono più qui directed by Vittorio Moroni (2013)
- Non scomparire! directed by Pietro Reggiani (2013)
- They Call It Summer directed by Paolo Franchi (2012)
- Italian movies directed by Matteo Pellegrini (2012)
- Ruggine directed by Daniele Gaglianone, (2011)
- Tutto bene directed by Daniele Maggioni (2011)
- I casi della vita directed by Corso Salani (2009)
- Raise Your Head directed by Alessandro Angelini (2009)
- La prima linea directed by Renato De Maria (2009)
- Mirna (film) directed by Corso Salani (2009)
- Italians directed by Giovanni Veronesi (2008)
- Segreti e sorelle directed by Francesco Jost (2008)
- Transition directed by Boris Palcic (2008)
- Lamor cortese directed by Claudio Camarca (2008)
- Principessa part time directed by Giorgio Arcelli (2008)
- Love, Soccer and Other Catastrophes directed by Luca Lucini (2007)
- La cura directed by Marco Bellocchio (2007)
- Come l'ombra directed by Marina Spada (2006)
- Manual of Love 2 directed by Giovanni Veronesi (2006)
- Saimir directed by Francesco Munzi (2005)
