= Il gioco =

Il gioco may refer to:

- Il gioco (comics), an Italian comic book series
- Il gioco (film), an Italian mystery film
