= Mehdi Dehbi =

Belgian actor and theater director

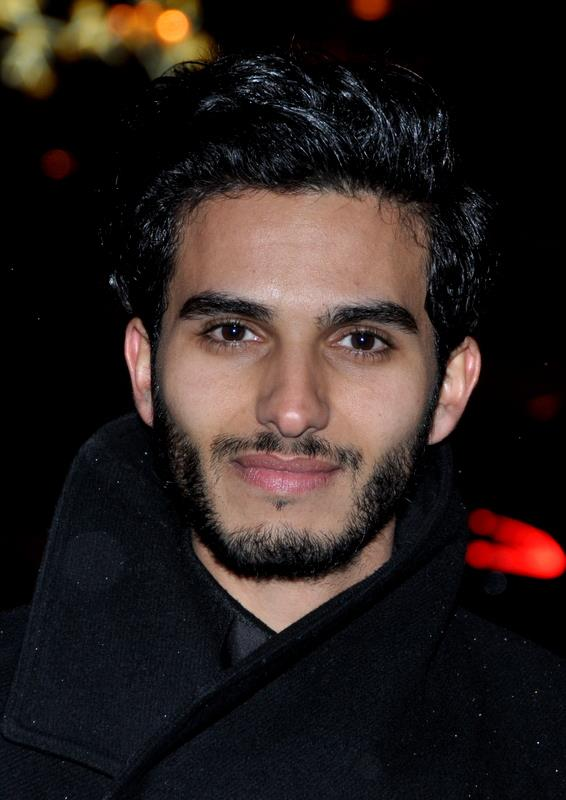
- Dehbi in 2013
- Born: December 5, 1985 (age 40); Liège, Wallonia, Belgium
- Occupations: Actor, director
- Years active: 2004 – present
- Notable work: La Folle Histoire d'amour de Simon Eskenazy (He is My Girl); Le Fils de l'Autre (The Other Son); A Most Wanted Man; Messiah

Mehdi Dehbi (born 5 December 1985) is a Belgian actor and theatre director, known for his roles in La Folle Histoire d'amour de Simon Eskenazy (2009, English title: He is My Girl), L'Infiltré (2011), Le Fils de l'Autre (2012, English title: The Other Son), Mary Queen of Scots (2013), and A Most Wanted Man (2014). In 2020, he played the title role in the Netflix series Messiah.

== Early life ==
Mehdi Dehbi was born on 5 December 1985 in the Hôpital de Bavière in Liège, to a family of Tunisian origin. From the age of ten, Dehbi attended the Académie Grétry theater and music school, which had been established in the hospital building where he had been born.

At the age of sixteen his first lead role in a feature film was in The Assassinated Sun, directed by Abdelkrim Bahloul and produced by the Dardenne brothers, for which he was nominated as Best Actor at the Joseph Plateau Awards.

After studying drama and music at the Royal Conservatory of Brussels, then at the CNSAD in Paris, and finally at the London Academy of Music and Dramatic Art, he pursued his career in film and theater.

In 2012 Mehdi directed his first play, Les Justes by Albert Camus at the Théâtre de Liège. The show toured in France and Germany in 2013 and in 2014 Mehdi Dehbi was nominated for the Découverte (Discovery) Prize at the 2014 Prix de la critique awards as a director.

== Film ==
Year	Title	Role	Director	Notes
2004	The Assassinated Sun	Hamid	Abdelkrim Bahloul	Nominated – Joseph Plateau Award for Best Belgian Actor
2006	Bourreau	Le Suicidé	Frédérick Vin	Short
2009	La Folle Histoire d'amour de Simon Eskenazy	Naïm	Jean-Jacques Zilbermann	
2010	Sweet Valentine	Pierre	Emma Luchini	
2011	Looking for Simon	Jalil	Jan Krüger	
2012	The Other Son	Yacine Al Bezaaz	Lorraine Lévy	International Film Festival of Boulogne-Billancourt - Best Actor
2013	Le sac de farine	Nari	Kadija Leclere	Nominated – Magritte Award for Most Promising Actor
2013	Je ne suis pas mort	Yacine	Mehdi Ben Attia	
2014	Lili Rose	Samir	Bruno Ballouard	
2014	A Most Wanted Man	Jamal Abdullah	Anton Corbijn	
2014	Mary Queen of Scots	David Rizzio	Thomas Imbach	
2015	Another South	Khaleed	Gianluca Maria Tavarelli	
2016	London Has Fallen	Sultan Mansoor	Babak Najafi	
2018	Mescaline	Mehdi	Clarisse Hahn	Short
2022	Boy from Heaven	Zizo	Tarik Saleh	Nominated - Magritte Award for Best Supporting Actor
2023	Animalia	Amine	Sofia Alaoui	
2025	Ambleside	Krishna	Mitch Jenkins	
TBA	Baron Day Barracks	Muhammad	Joah Jordan	Filming

== Television ==
Year	Title	Role	Director	Notes
2007	Septième Ciel Belgique	Guillaume	Luc Boland, André Chandelle, ...	TV series (10 episodes)
2011	L'Infiltré	Issam Mourad	Giacomo Battiato	TV Movie; Biarritz Film Festival - Golden Fipa for Best Actor
2014-15	Tyrant	Abdul	Gwyneth Horder-Payton, Michael Lehmann, ...	TV series (11 episodes)
2020	Messiah	Al-Masih	James McTeigue & Kate Woods	TV series (10 episodes)

== Theatre ==
Year	Title	Author	Director
2007	Romeo and Juliet	William Shakespeare	John Baxter
2009	Terre Sainte	Mohamed Kacimi	Sophie Akrich
2009-10	Baïbars le mamelouk qui devint sultan	Marcel Bozonnet	Marcel Bozonnet
2010	Splendid's	Jean Genet	Cristèle Alves Meira
2011	Gare de l'Est	Sophie Akrich	Sophie Akrich
2012	Romeo and Juliet	William Shakespeare	David Bobée

== Theatre directing ==
Year	Title	Author	Notes
2012-14	Les Justes	Albert Camus	Théâtre de Liège, Théâtre des Tanneurs (Brussels), Théâtre du Jeu de Paume (Aix-en-Provence), Fast Forward Theater Festival (Braunschweig); Nominated for the Découverte Prize at the 2014 Prix de la critique awards
