= Alessandra Acciai =

Italian actress (born 1965)

- Born: December 12, 1965 (age 60); Rome, Italy
- Occupation: Actress

Alessandra Acciai (born December 12, 1965, in Rome) is an Italian film, television and stage actress, whose career spanned over 30 years.

== Biography ==
Born in Rome, Acciai made her film debut in 1987, while still a student at the Accademia Nazionale di Arte Drammatica Silvio D'Amico. Since the late 1980s she specialized in comedy films.

In 1994 Acciai was awarded revelation actress of the year at Grolle d'oro for her performances in Enzo Monteleone's The True Life of Antonio H. and Rosalía Polizzi's Anni Ribelli. She later participated in works by young directors such as Claudia Florio, Marco Filiberti and Eugenio Cappuccio.

Acciai made her television debut in 1989 playing the leading role in the television film Il gioko, a thriller directed by Lamberto Bava, and is best known for the role of Cora in the series Incantesimo, in which she appeared for two consecutive seasons. Starting from the 1990s, she was also active on stage, working among others with Memè Perlini, Giulio Base, Sibilla Barbieri, Gigio Alberti, and Rosalinda Celentano.

== Filmography ==
=== Cinema ===
- Casa mia, casa mia..., directed by Neri Parenti (1988)
- Supysaua, directed by Enrico Coletti (1988)
- Nulla ci può fermare, directed by Antonello Grimaldi (1989)
- Ferdinando uomo d'amore, directed by Memè Perlini (1990)
- Una fredda mattina di maggio, directed by Vittorio Sindoni (1990)
- Venus Fear, directed by Hirtia Solaro (1991)
- Le donne non vogliono più, directed by Pino Quartullo (1993)
- Il giorno del giudizio (The Day of Judgment), directed by Nello Rossati (1993)
- La vera vita di Antonio H. (The True Life of Antonio H.), directed by Enzo Monteleone (1994)
- Anni ribelli (Rebel Years), directed by Rosalía Polizzi (1994)
- Albergo Roma, directed by Ugo Chiti (1996)
- Uomini senza donne (Men without women), directed by Angelo Longoni (1996)
- Profili (Profiles), various directors (1996)
- La lettera (The letter), directed by Dario Migliardi (1997) - short film
- La terza luna (the third moon), directed by Matteo Bellinelli (1997)
- La classe non è acqua (Class is not water), directed by Cecilia Calvi (1997)
- Oltre la giustizia (Beyond Justice), directed by Juan José Jusid (1997)
- Il gioco (The Game), directed by Claudia Florio (1999)
- Princesa, directed by Henrique Goldman (2001)
- Poco più di un anno fa - Diario di un pornodivo (A little over a year ago - Diary of a porn star), directed by Marco Filiberti (2003)
- Come mosche (Like flies), directed by Eugenio Cappuccio (2005)
- Il grande sogno (The Big Dream), directed by Michele Placido (2008)
- Il figlio più piccolo (The youngest son), directed by Pupi Avati (2010)
- Amici miei – Come tutto ebbe inizio (My friends - How it all began), directed by Neri Parenti (2011)
- La mia ombra è tua (My shadow is yours), directed by Eugenio Cappuccio (2022)

== Television ==
- Il gioko (The game, directed by Lamberto Bava - TV movie (1989)
- ...e se poi se ne vanno? (...and then if they leave?), directed by Giorgio Capitani - TV miniseries (1989)
- Scoop, directed by José María Sánchez - TV movie (1991)
- Morte di una strega (Death of a witch), directed by Cinzia TH Torrini - TV miniseries (1996)
- Teo, directed by Cinzia TH Torrini - TV movie (1997)
- Due donne contro, directed by Luciano Odorisio (1997)
- Una donna per amico – TV series (1998)
- Il maresciallo Rocca – TV series, episode 2x02 (1998)
- Mai con i quadri, directed by Mario Caiano – TV miniseries (1999)
- Incantesimo 3 – soap opera (2000)
- Lupo mannaro, directed by Antonio Tibaldi — TV film (2000)
- Qualcuno da amare, directed by Giuliana Gamba – TV film (2000)
- Incantesimo 4 – soap opera (2001)
- Un papà quasi perfetto, directed by Maurizio Dell'Orso – TV miniseries (2003)
- Don Matteo – serie TV, TV series, episode 5x12 (2006)
- Cuore di ghiaccio, directed by Matteo Bellinelli – TV film (2006)
- Vivi e lascia vivere – TV series (2020)

== Screenplay ==
- Rex – Tv series 1x03, Episode 1x07 (2008)
