= Edgar Çani =

Albanian footballer (born 1989)

Personal information
- Date of birth: 22 July 1989 (age 37)
- Place of birth: Tirana, Albania
- Height: 1.92 m (6 ft 4 in)
- Position: Forward

Team information
- Current team: MCC Montegranaro

Youth career
- 2004–2007: Pescara

Senior career*
Years	Team	Apps	(Gls)
2007–2008	Pescara	11	(3)
2008–2011	Palermo	1	(0)
2008–2009	→ Ascoli (loan)	24	(4)
2009	→ Padova (loan)	19	(2)
2010	→ Piacenza (loan)	14	(4)
2010–2011	→ Modena (loan)	34	(5)
2011–2013	Polonia Warsaw	31	(11)
2013–2015	Catania	19	(3)
2013	→ Carpi (loan)	14	(1)
2014	→ Bari (loan)	14	(3)
2015	→ Leeds United (loan)	4	(0)
2015–2017	Pisa	59	(7)
2017–2018	Partizani Tirana	11	(1)
2018–2020	Vibonese	22	(2)
2022	Torres	3	(0)
2022	Aprilia	7	(1)
2022–2023	Legnano	14	(1)
2023–2024	Crema	15	(0)
2025	United Riccione	7	(0)
2025–2026	Vogherese	6	(2)
2026–	MCC Montegranaro	0	(0)

International career^{‡}
2012–2016	Albania	16	(4)
- * Club domestic league appearances and goals as of 14 December 2025 ‡ National team caps and goals as of 12 November 2016

Edgar Çani (born 22 July 1989) is an Albanian professional footballer who plays as a striker for Italian Eccellenza club MCC Montegranaro.

== Club career ==
=== Early career ===
Çani was born in Tirana, Albania but grew up in Città della Pieve in the Perugia central Italy, after his family emigrated to Italy in the famous exodus of the Vlora ship on 8 August 1991. He was first spotted by a Pescara scout in 2004 and started his youth career at the time. He signed his first professional contract with the biancazzurri in 2007. He played for Pescara in Serie C1 in the first half of the 2007–08 season overall 11 matches, 7 as a starter and 4 as a substitute, scoring 3 goals.

=== Palermo ===
On 31 January 2008 Serie A side Palermo confirmed to have signed Cani, along with Luca Di Matteo, for a reported €600,000 and €500,000 fee respectively. In their June 2008 accounts Palermo showed the signings as being for €450,000 each.

Çani made his Serie A debut on 27 April 2008 in a 0–0 home tie against Atalanta coming on as a substitute in the 73rd minute in place of Edinson Cavani.

==== Loan at Ascoli ====
In July 2008, Ascoli confirmed they had signed Çani on loan for the 2008–09 Serie B season. He scored 4 goals in 24 appearances, most of them as a starter. Ascoli finished the season in 16th.

==== Loan at Padova ====
On 20 August 2009 Çani was signed with fellow Serie B team Padova on loan. He made his competitive debut one day later in the opening league matchday against Modena by playing the last 17 minutes of a 1–0 home win. His first score-sheet contributions came in his second ever appearance for the club one week later, scoring the equaliser in an eventual 1–1 draw at Reggina. During the first half of the 2009–10 season, Çani was below expectations, netting only twice in 19 appearances.

==== Loan at Piacenza ====
He left Padova in January 2010 to be loaned out to another Serie B team, Piacenza, for the rest of the season. He made his debut for Piacenza by scoring two goals in a 3–1 win over Triestina. He finished his loan spell with a respectable number of 6 goals in 14 appearances.

==== Loan at Modena ====
After his loan move to Piacenza expired at the end of the season, Çani was sent out on loan again to Modena, another Serie B club, in July 2010. His debut occurred on 22 August 2010 in the matchday 1 against his former side Piacenza which finished in a 1–0 home win. Çani scored his first two goals with the team later on 13 November in the matchday 15 against Vicenza, leading the team into a 2–1 home win. This was followed by another goal one week later, but this time in a 3–2 away defeat to Torino. Çani was used mostly as a starter during the 2010–11 season, appearing in 34 league matches, including 22 as starter, collecting 1983 minutes. He also made 2 Coppa Italia appearances, scoring once in a 4–1 home win over Sorrento.

=== Polonia Warsaw ===
The following year he was sold to Polonia Warsaw. He soon got into a conflict with the club's owner, coach and team and started to look for a new team, however he decided to stay with Polonia. In the Summer of 2012 he refused to return to Poland and missed the teams pre-season training camps. After finally returning he found his opportunities limited and, after an argument with the team coach, found himself training with the youth academy team.

In total he scored 11 league goals for Polonia, with 16 of his 31 league appearances coming as a substitute. His move to Serie A side Catania was considered controversial, by the Polish media, as he was considered to be still technically a Polonia Warsaw player until 2015.

=== Catania ===
Çani made his return to Serie A, signing on 22 January 2013 for Catania on a 3-year contract. He made his debut on 3 March 2013 in a 3–2 loss against Inter, coming on as a substitute in place of Gonzalo Bergessio in the 85th minute, he was booked just a minute after coming on.

==== Loan at Carpi ====
He was loaned to Serie B side Carpi on 23 July 2013. He made his debut on 11 August 2013 in a Coppa Italia - 2nd round match against Reggina, playing the full 90 minutes match in a 1–0 loss. His league debut came on 24 August 2013 in the 2013–14 Serie B opening match against Ternana, finished in the 1–0 loss with Çani playing the full 90-minutes. He scored his first goal for Carpi on 21 September 2013 against Cesena, where he came in as a 77th-minute substitute for Alessandro Sgrigna and scoring 10 minutes later. The match ended in a 4–1 defeat.

==== Loan at Bari ====
In January 2014 he was loaned to Bari until 30 June 2014. He made his debut in a 2–1 loss against Brescia on 1 February, coming on as an 84th-minute substitute for Stefano Sabelli. His first start came in a 0–0 draw against Crotone on 22 March, Çani played the full 90-minutes. /his second start came on 26 April 2014 against Padova, the game finished in a 2–1 victory but Cani was taken off in the 62nd minute for João Silva. Çani scored his first goal for Bari on 13 May 2014, scoring in the 2nd minute of a 2–1 win against previous club Carpi. On 30 May 2014 Çani scored twice in a 4–1 victory against Novara in the closing match of the regular season 2013–14 Serie B. Cani scored an equalizer in the 62nd minute, only 6 minutes after coming on as a substitute, and a second in the 74th minute. Bari finished the regular season in 7th place to qualify for the play-off promotions to Serie A where they shorted to play against Crotone for the quarter-finals.

Bari played Crotone on 3 June 2014 and won 3–0 result, with Çani playing the full 90-minutes. With this victory Bari advanced to the semi-finals, where they faced Latina in a two-legged tie. Çani scored in the first leg, a 2–2 draw played on 8 June 2014. The second-leg was played on 12 June 2014 and again resulted in a 2–2, Cani playing the full 90-minutes. With the aggregate score at 4–4 Latina advanced to the final as the higher placed team of the regular season, as they finished in 3rd place and Bari in 7th place.

==== Return to Catania ====
Çani returned to Catania ahead of 2014–15 season. He wasn't included to the team for the opening match against Virtus Lanciano, but made his first appearance of the season on 7 September by starting in the 3–2 away defeat to Pro Vercelli. He then was sent off in the matchday 7 against Frosinone on 4 October 2014. receiving a red card five minutes after coming in. Çani's first score-sheet contributions of the season came later on 25 October, where he scored the opener in the 3–1 rout against Vicenza. On 6 December 2014, he scored a goal, and provided an assist, in a 2–2 draw away at Bologna. He scored the third of the campaign two weeks later, a 6th-minute header, in a 2–2 draw against Brescia.

==== Loan at Leeds United ====
On 2 February 2015, Çani joined Leeds United on loan for the remainder of the 2014–15 season, the deal includes an option to buy. Granddi N'Goyi's number was then changed to number six with Football League approval, with Çani taking the number 10 shirt.

He made his debut, as an 85th-minute substitute, against Brentford on 7 February 2015. He was an unused substitute in the next game, against Reading.

On 18 April 2015, Cani was one of six Massimo Cellino signings (along with Mirco Antenucci, Giuseppe Bellusci, Souleymane Doukara, Dario Del Fabro, Marco Silvestri) who controversially pulled out of the squad with an 'injury' the day before a 2–1 loss against Charlton Athletic.

=== Pisa ===
On 31 August 2015, Çani confirmed his agreement with his new club Pisa of Lega Pro by signing a two-year contract. He was presented and was given squad number 9, stating that he was happy that the agreement came up after some negotiations and he will play alongside to a great coach as Gattuso.

Çani scored his first goal of the 2016–17 season in his 22nd game on 4 February 2017 against Virtus Entella as he came in as a substitute in the 68th minute for fellow Albania national team's striker Rey Manaj to score the equalizer 10 minutes later and to give his team an important 1–1 draw.

=== Partizani Tirana ===
On 4 August 2017, Çani joined Albanian Superliga side Partizani Tirana by penning a two-year contract. The transfer made him the highest paid player in Albania, with an estimated monthly fee of €20,000. He was presented three days later and was given squad number 9, last worn by Mathew Boniface, stating: I'm here to win the championship."

Çani missed the opening league match against Laçi, lost 0–2, due to knee injury, but returned on 13 September in the first round of 2017–18 Albanian Cup first round against Naftëtari Kuçovë, scoring a goal in a 6–2 away win. However, his knee injury reappeared at the end of the month, which forced the striker to travel to Italy for further examinations. In December 2017, Çani underwent knee surgery again after originally going in May of the same year. He returned on training in February of the following year, and made his first appearance in over six-month by entering in the last minutes of a 3–0 home win versus Luftëtari Gjirokastër on 10 March.

Çani scored his first Albanian Superliga goal for the team nine days later, netting with a header in the second half against Flamurtari Vlorë to seal a 1–0 win at home. Later in May, he was involved in a physical confrontation with team manager Klevis Dalipi during a training session. Partizani Tirana finished 5th in league which initially left them without European football, but following Skënderbeu Korçë exclusion by UEFA and later Court of Arbitration for Sport due to match-fixing, the team was given a spot for the 2018–19 UEFA Europa League first qualifying round.

Following the end of the season, Çani's monthly wage was decreased down to €6,000 after a failed first season. On 7 July, he was excluded from the UEFA Europa League team, with the manager describing it as a "tactical choice". Later on 31 July, Çani begun training with the B squad after refusing to terminate the contract by mutual consent.

=== Vibonese ===
On 27 August 2018, he returned to Italy, signing with Serie C club Vibonese. His contract with Vibonese was terminated by mutual consent on 21 January 2020, he has not appeared for the club since April 2019.

=== Later years in Serie D ===
In 2022 he moved to Sassari Torres, the main club in the city of Sassari in Sardinia, playing Serie D at the time. After having been unattached for the beginning of the 2022–23 season, on 27 October he signed for Aprilia, another Serie D club. He however left Aprilia soon afterwards, then joining Legnano, another Serie D club, on 28 December 2022.

== International career ==
In February 2011 Çani told the Albanian media that it was his dream to be part of the Albania national football team. He was called up at Albania by new appointed coach Gianni De Biasi for the match against Georgia on 29 February 2012. He debuted for Albania in this match as a starter and scored his first international goal as well, only two minutes after the kick-off and the match finished as a 2–1 loss.

=== 2014 FIFA World Cup qualification ===
In the opening match of the 2014 FIFA World Cup qualifiers against Cyprus, Çani came on as an 81st-minute substitute for Hamdi Salihi and scored in the 84th minute after a cross from Jahmir Hyka to put Albania ahead 2–1 in a game which eventually ended in a 3–1 win for Albania. In the 3rd match of the qualifiers, against Iceland, he scored after an assist by Alban Meha, but his goal wasn't enough as Iceland went on to win 2–1.

On 26 March 2013 he scored in a 4–1 win against Lithuania in a friendly match.

Çani was left out of the squads for the final two qualifying matches, against Switzerland and Cyprus on 11 and 15 October 2013.

=== 2018 FIFA World Cup qualification ===
Following the absence of fellow strikers Armando Sadiku & Rey Manaj which were injured and unable to recover in time for the 2018 FIFA World Cup qualification matches against Liechtenstein on 6 October 2016 and against Spain on 9 October 2016, coach Gianni De Biasi decided to return Çani to the national team after 3 years as a replacement. He was an unused substitute for both matches. He was called up also for the next 2018 FIFA World Cup qualification match against Israel on 12 November 2016 as Armando Sadiku wasn't recovered yet. He played against Israel coming on as a substitute in the 79th minute in place of Elseid Hysaj playing in the front line among Bekim Balaj & Rey Manaj as Albania were down by 9 men and in 0–2 disadvantage looking to score. The match however ended in a 0–3 loss.

== Style of play ==
Due to his height, Çani is renowned as a target man centre forward, with his strengths being his heading ability and ability to hold the ball up to bring his teammates into the game.

== Career statistics ==
=== Club ===
As of match played 14 December 2025

Club statistics
Club	Season	League			Cup		Europe (Note: Including continental competitions, such as UEFA Champions League and UEFA Europa League)		Other		Total	
Club	Season	Division	Apps	Goals	Apps	Goals	Apps	Goals	Apps	Goals	Apps	Goals
Pescara	2007–08	Serie C1	11	3	—		—		—		11	3
Palermo	2007–08	Serie A	1	0	—		—		—		1	0
Ascoli (loan)	2008–09	Serie B	24	4	1	0	—		—		25	4
Padova (loan)	2009–10	Serie B	19	2	—		—		—		19	2
Piacenza (loan)	2009–10	Serie B	14	4	—		—		—		14	4
Modena (loan)	2010–11	Serie B	34	5	2	1	—		—		36	6
Polonia Warsaw	2011–12	Ekstraklasa	26	11	2	2	—		—		28	13
Polonia Warsaw	2012–13	Ekstraklasa	5	0	1	0	—		—		6	0
Polonia Warsaw	Total		31	11	3	2	—		—		34	13
Catania	2012–13	Serie A	4	0	—		—		—		4	0
Catania	2014–15	Serie B	15	3	—		—		—		15	3
Catania	Total		19	3	—		—		—		19	3
Carpi (loan)	2013–14	Serie B	14	1	1	0	—		—		15	1
Bari (loan)	2013–14	Serie B	14	3	—		—		3	1	17	4
Leeds United	2014–15	Championship	4	0	—		—		—		4	0
Pisa	2015–16	Lega Pro	26	5	1	0	—		5	1	32	6
Pisa	2016–17	Serie B	33	2	1	0	—		—		34	2
Pisa	Total		59	7	2	0	—		5	1	66	8
Partizani Tirana	2017–18	Kategoria Superiore	2	0	1	1	—		—		3	1
Vibonese	2018–19	Serie C	22	2	—		—		—		22	2
Vibonese	2019–20	Serie C	—		—		—		—		0	0
Sassari Torres	2021–22	Serie D	3	0	—		—		—		3	0
Aprilia	2022–23	Serie D	7	1	—		—		—		7	1
Legnano	2022–23	Serie D	14	1	—		—		—		14	1
Crema	2023–24	Serie D	15	0	—		—		—		15	0
United Riccione	2024–25	Serie D	7	0	—		—		—		7	0
Vogherese	2025–26	Serie D	3	1	—		—		—		3	1
Career total			317	48	10	4	—		8	2	335	54

=== International ===
As of match played 12 November 2016

National team	Year	Apps	Goals
Albania	2012	9	3
Albania	2013	6	1
Albania	2016	1	0
Total		16	4

==== International goals ====
As of 26 March 2013. Albania score listed first, score column indicates score after each Çani's goal.

International goals by date, venue, cap, opponent, score, result and competition
No.	Date	Venue	Cap	Opponent	Score	Result	Competition
1	29 February 2012	Mikheil Meskhi Stadium, Tbilisi	1	Georgia	1–0	1–2	Friendly
2	7 September 2012	Qemal Stafa Stadium, Tirana, Albania	5	Cyprus	2–1	3–1	2014 FIFA World Cup qualification
3	12 October 2012	Qemal Stafa Stadium, Tirana, Albania	7	Iceland	1–1	1–2	2014 FIFA World Cup qualification
4	26 March 2013	Qemal Stafa Stadium, Tirana, Albania	11	Lithuania	2–0	4–1	Friendly

== Honours ==
Pisa

- Lega Pro runner-up and play-off winner: 2015–16
