= OASI =

OASI or Oasi may refer to:

- Old-age and survivors insurance in Switzerland, abbreviated OASI in English
- Social Security Trust Fund, also known as the Old-Age and Survivors Insurance (OASI) Trust Fund
- Oasi (film), a 1994 Italian romance-drama film
