= Cristiano Bortone =

Italian film director, screenwriter and film producer

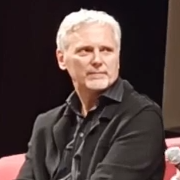
- Born: 2 July 1968 (age 58); Rome, Italy
- Occupation: Director

Cristiano Bortone (born 2 July 1968) is an Italian director, screenwriter and producer. He is Managing Director of the Sino-European Association Bridging the Dragon.

During his career he has received numerous awards, including the David Giovani Award at the David di Donatello 2007 for the film Red as the sky, the award for Best Director at the Bari international film festival 2024 for the film My Place Is Here, and as Best Italian Producer the Nomination for the Nastri d'argento 2006 for the film Saimir and the David di Donatello 2016 for the film Coffee.

== Life and career ==
Born in Rome, Bortone graduated in Film and Television Studies in 1990 at the New York University. Starting from the same year he was active as director of commercials, documentaries and short films with his company Orisa produzioni. In the same year he became co-founder and Managing director of the Euro-Asian producers association Bridging Visions (aka Bridging the Dragon) official partner of European Film Market, Marché du Film and several film institutions from Europe and China.

In 1994 he made his feature film debut with the romance-drama Oasi, which was screened at the 51st Venice International Film Festival. In 2000, he directed his second feature, Sono Positivo (I am positive), a black comedy on the theme of HIV with a wild score including songs from the tradition of Neapolitan trash music and 70's genre films. The movie is chosen as official film of del World Gay Pride that was held in Rome.

In 2001 he completed the feature documentary L'erba proibita (Forbidden grass) a colorful and provocative journey in the world of marijuana. Several Italian comedians and bands participated in the film, such as Dario Fo, Paolo Rossi, 99 Posse, Tiromancino, Pitura Freska, and Articolo 31.

Also an active producer of film and TV, in 2006 he was nominated at the Italian film critics award Nastri d'argento as Best producer for the film Saimir by Francesco Munzi. The film also wins, among others, the Special mention at the Venice International Film Festival and again at the Nastri d'argento as Best debut film at the David di Donatello Awards and the European Film Award.

In 2006 he directed the film Red Like the Sky (Rosso come il cielo), inspired by the life of blind sound editor Mirco Mencacci. The film premieres as Special Event at the first Rome Film Festival and won the David Giovani at the 2007 David di Donatello Awards. The film embarks its international distribution, wins more than 25 awards in international film festivals such as San Paulo International Film Festival, Sydney, Durban, Amsterdam Cinekid, Amburgo Children film fest, Montreal Children Film Festival, Isfahan (Iran), San Luis (Argentina), Palm Beach, Palm Springs and is sold in several countries worldwide. In Japan the film was adapted into a novel. In China it was released with the title 听见天堂 with a rating of 8.9 by the users of the popular film site Douban.

Bortone collaborates to the script of the miniseries Moana produced by Sky. He gets involved in more international co-productions such as Wedding Fever in Campobello starring Italian comedy legend Lino Banfi and co-produced with CWP and Constantin Film, that in Germany enjoys more than 1.5 millions admissions, or Marina by Oscar nominated Stijn Coninx inspired by the life of famous singer Rocco Granata co-produced by Eyeworks Belgium and the company of the Dardenne Brothers, that becomes one of the 10 highest-grossing films of the history of Flemish cinema.

Following the Italian trend of popular comedies, in 2012 he comes back to directing with the rom-com 10 Rules for Falling in Love. with Italian comedian Vincenzo Salemme and web star Guglielmo Scilla. The film becomes also a book and is turned into a remake in the Czech Republic 10 Rules.

The success of Red Like the Sky in China and his knowledge of Mandarin language make him become interested in the Chinese film market. He is invited as guest professor at the Beijing film academy and collaborates with festivals and institutions such as FIRST film festival of Chinese new talents. In 2014 he creates his own Chinese production company called Yiyi pictures and he starts developing content for the local market. In the same year he is co-founder and Managing director of the Sino-European producers association Bridging the dragon official partner of European Film Market, Marché du Film and several FILM institutions from Europe and China.

In 2016 he presented his film Coffee the first official co-production between Italy and China starring talents such as Ennio Fantastichini, Zhuo Tan, Koen De Bouw. The film is Special event at Giornate degli autori - Venice days and in competition at the San Paulo Film Festival, Beijing International Film Festival and Cairo Film Festival. For the film Bortone is nominated at the David di Donatello as Best producer and as Best film at the China media awards at Shanghai Film Festival.

Bortone taught at several film schools such as at the Beijing Film Academy in 2013. He held seminars such one on writing for children's films at Cinekid Festival in 2008. He was tutor for the writing development program organize by SESC Rio de Janeiro and for FIRST film festival in Xining. He was a consultant for Media - Creative Europe and speaker on Chinese film market at several workshops.

Besides film, he also collected other artistic and professional experiences. He was contributing for magazines like Panorama (Italy), Expresso (Portugal), Sopra il livello del mare, "Opening" on contemporary art, media and culture. As visual artist he exhibited in the 90's taking place at group shows like the Triennale di Termoli or Imprimatur curated by Achille Bonito Oliva. For a few years he was running the contemporary art gallery "The office" located in Rome.

In 2022 he produced the film The Italian Recipe, again a co-production between Italy and China with Chinese comedy house Kaixin Mahua Fun Age Pictures. It is a romantic comedy directed by director Zuxin Hou and starring actress Yao Huang. The film was the opening film of the Udine Far East film festival and was successfully distributed in China

In 2024 he produced the documentary film ALTRI ANIMALI directed by Guido Votano and focused on the figures of the well-known Sardinian vets Monica Pais and Paolo Briguglia and the film Una Ballena by Spanish director Pablo Hernando.
