= Mario Valdemarin =

Italian actor (1926–2023)

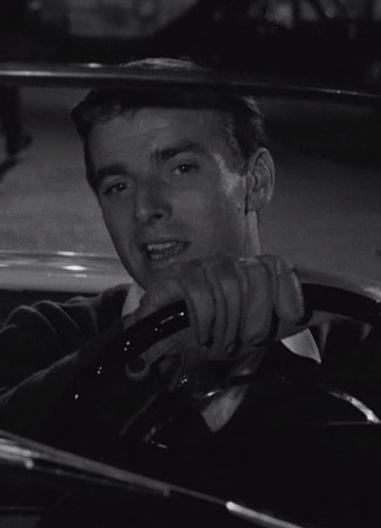
Valdemarin in 1958

Mario Valdemarin (30 December 1926 – 12 December 2023) was an Italian actor known for his roles in Hercules and the Conquest of Atlantis, Sandokan the Great and The End of the Night.

Valdemarin died from complications of COVID-19 in Rome, on 12 December 2023, at the age of 96.
