= Raise Your Head =

- Directed by: Alessandro Angelini
- Written by: Alessandro Angelini; Angelo Carbone; Francesca Marciano
- Starring: Sergio Castellitto
- Cinematography: Arnaldo Catinari
- Music by: Luca Tozzi
- Release date: 2009
- Country: Italy
- Language: Italian

Raise Your Head (Italian: Alza la testa) is a 2009 Italian drama film written and directed by Alessandro Angelini.

For her performance Anita Kravos was nominated for David di Donatello for best supporting actress, and the film also received two nominations a Nastri d'Argento Awards, for best original story and for best actor (Sergio Castellitto).

== Cast ==
- Sergio Castellitto as Mero
- Gabriele Campanelli as Lorenzo
- Giorgio Colangeli as Malagodi
- Anita Kravos as Sonia
- Duccio Camerini as Abatino
- Augusto Fornari as Brancifiore
- Gabriel Spahiu as Radu

== See also ==
- List of Italian films of 2009
