= Casa famiglia =

Italian television series

- Created by: Achille Manzotti
- Composer: Andrea Guerra
- Country of origin: Italy
- No. of seasons: 2
- No. of episodes: 20

Original release
- Release: 2001 – 2003

Casa famiglia (Family home) is an Italian television series that aired from April 20, 2001 to May 30, 2003 on Rai 1. The series, a spin-off of the series Un prete tra noi (A priest among us), follows Don Marco (Massimo Dapporto) taking over the responsibilities of his family home from his ailing father.

== Cast ==
- Massimo Dapporto: Don Marco
- Ettore Bassi: Andrea
- Arnoldo Foà: Padre Marcello
- Violante Placido: Giulia
- Massimo Poggio: Attilio
- Marco Beretta: Pietro
- Eljana Popova: Marinetta
- Remo Remotti: Luigi
- Adriano Pantaleo: Marmitta
- Ciro Esposito: Carlo
- Nina Soldano: Benedetta
- Aisha Cerami: Carmen

== See also ==
- List of Italian television series
