= The End of the Night =

- Directed by: Davide Ferrario
- Written by: Davide Ferrario
- Starring: Claudio Bigagli
- Cinematography: Roberto Schaefer
- Music by: Daniele Bacalov
- Release date: 1989
- Country: Italy
- Language: Italian

The End of the Night (Italian: La fine della notte) is a 1989 Italian crime drama film written and directed by Davide Ferrario, at his directorial debut. It was entered into the main competition at the 1989 San Sebastián International Film Festival. It is loosely based on a crime event happened in Veneto in 1986.

== Cast ==
- Claudio Bigagli as Claudio
- Dario Parisini as Vincenzo
- Alessandro Baldinotti as Beppe
- Albino Bignamini as Giovanni
- John Sayles as Wayne
- Mario Valdemarin as Meroni
- Rosanna D'Andrea as Lucia
- Massimo Mazzucco as Psychologist
- Adriano Micantoni
- Giovanni Lindo Ferretti
