= Two Brothers, My Sister =

Três Irmãos
- Directed by: Teresa Villaverde
- Starring: Maria de Medeiros
- Release date: 1994
- Country: Portugal
- Language: Portuguese

Três Irmãos; Two Brothers, My Sister is a 1994 Portuguese drama film directed by Teresa Villaverde..

== Plot ==
Twenty-year-old Maria lives with her family in Lisbon. Her two brothers, and later her mother, leave her alone with her blind father. She lives a difficult, bitter, and sometimes cruel daily life, suffering in silence. Maria loses her job, and the police are after her. One day, Maria decides to end it all and end her life.

== Cast ==
- Maria de Medeiros : Maria
- Marcello Urgeghe : Mário
- Evgeniy Sidikhin : João
- Laura del Sol : Teresa
- Mireille Perrier : the teacher
- Olimpia Carlisi : the mother

== Reception ==
Maria de Medeiros won the Volpi Cup for Best Actress at the 51st Venice International Film Festival.
