= Rhona Mitra =

English actress and singer (born 1976)

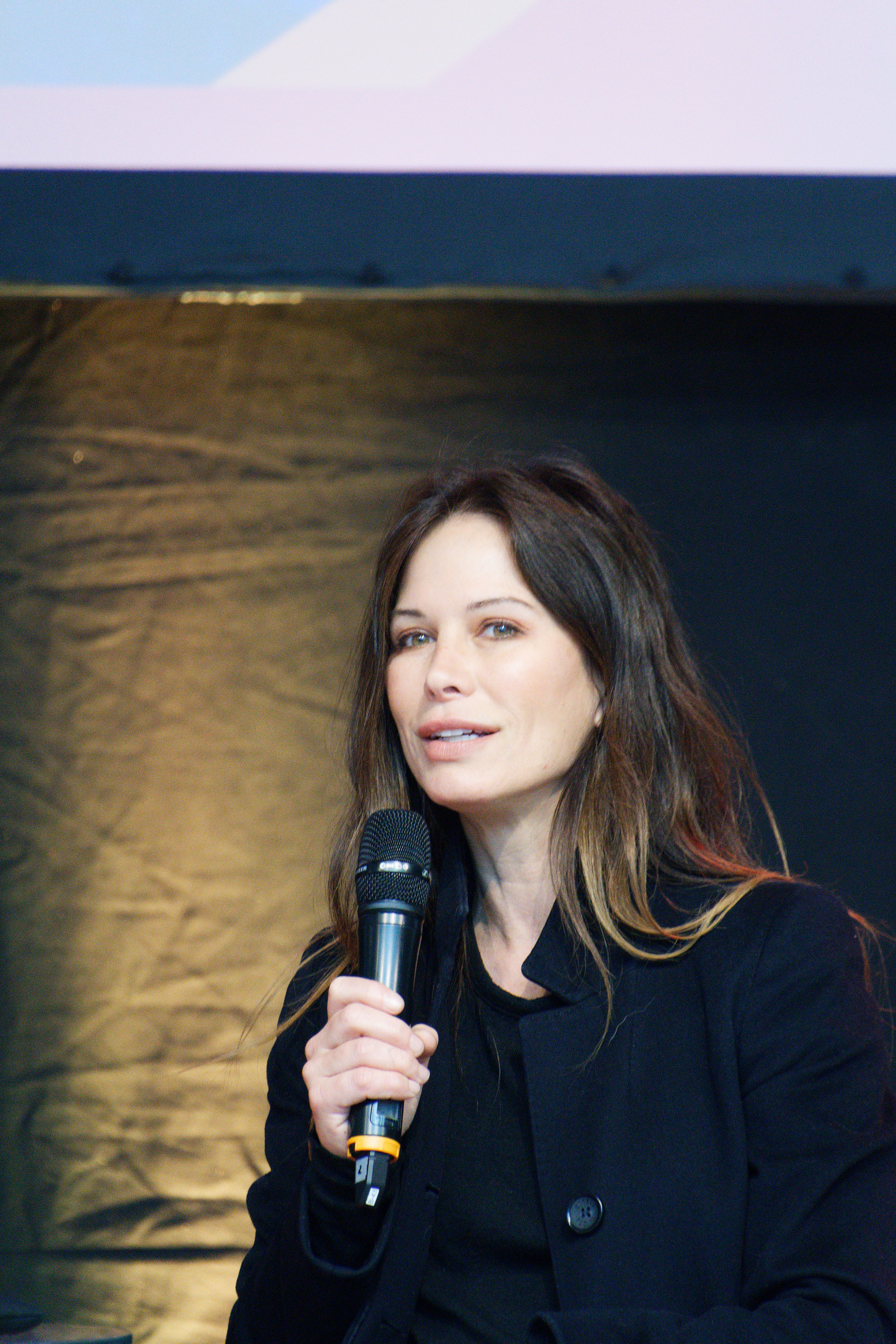
- Mitra in 2023
- Born: Rhona Natasha Mitra; 9 August 1976 (age 50); Paddington, London, England
- Occupations: Actress; singer
- Years active: 1995–present

Rhona Natasha Mitra (born 9 August 1976) is an English actress and singer.

Mitra is known for her roles as, Sonja in Underworld: Rise of the Lycans (2009); as Major Rachel Dalton in the second and third seasons of Strike Back (2012–2013); as Rachel Scott in the first two seasons of The Last Ship (2014–2015); Holly Marie Begins in the sixth season of Party of Five (1999–2000); as Kate Hedges in Ali G Indahouse (2002); as Tara Wilson in the final season of The Practice (2003–2004) and the first and second seasons of Boston Legal (2004–2005); as Detective Kit McGraw in the third season of Nip/Tuck (2005); in the lead role of the science fiction/action film Doomsday as Major Eden Sinclair (2008); as an assassin in the Netflix film Game Over, Man! (2018); and as Mercy Graves in the CW series Supergirl (2018). She was also the live-action model of the video game character Lara Croft in 1997.

== Early life ==
Rhona Natasha Mitra was born on 9 August 1976 in the Paddington area of London, the daughter of Anthony Mitra, a surgeon, and Nora Downey. Her father is of Indian descent, while her mother is Irish.

== Career ==
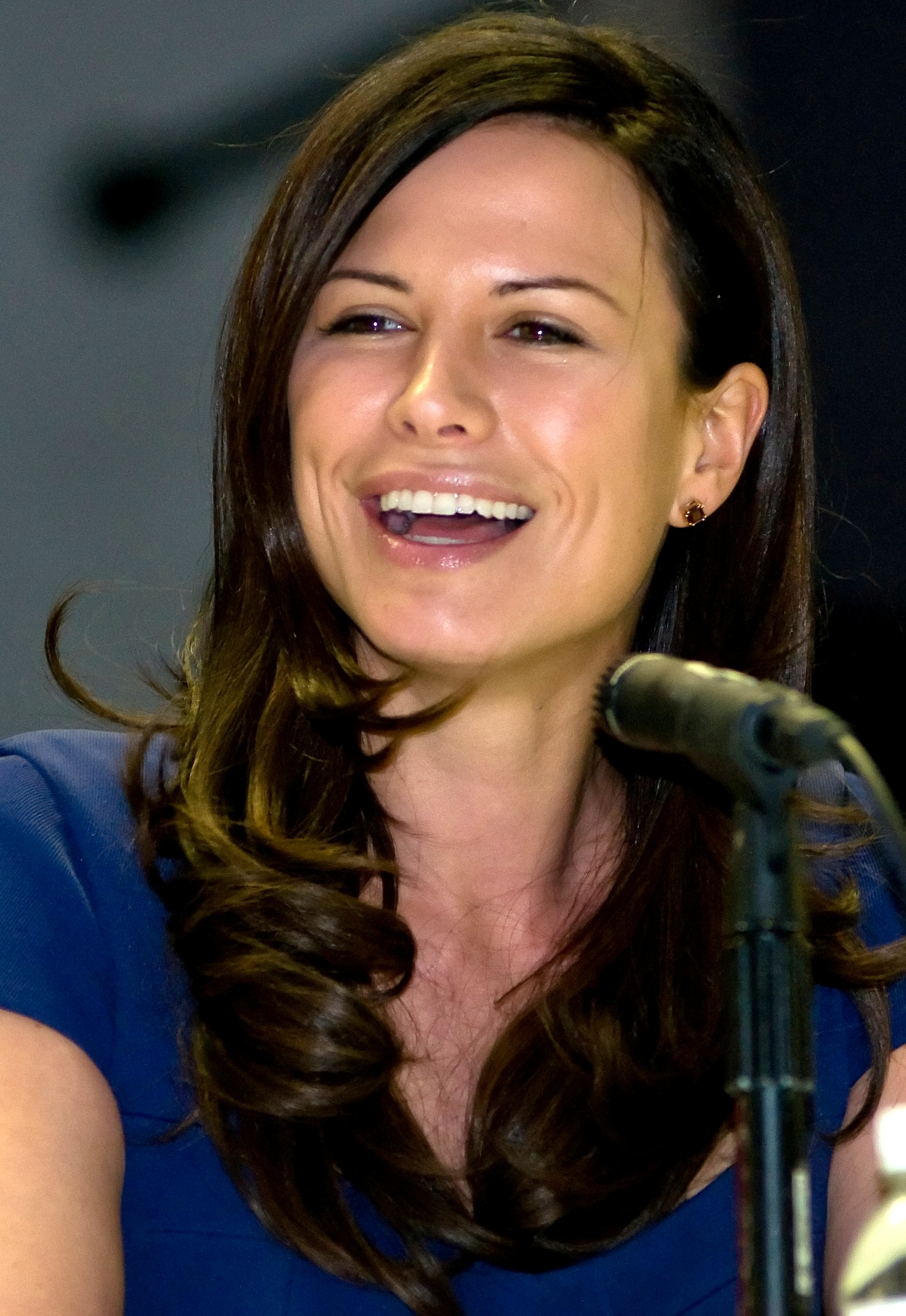
Mitra in 2009

In 1997, Mitra appeared as the live-action model for Lara Croft, the lead character in Eidos Interactive's Tomb Raider video game series, before Angelina Jolie earned the role for the two Tomb Raider films (2001–2003). She played the romantic interest of Christopher Lambert in Beowulf (1999). Her first main role came as Scott Wolf's illicit love interest on Party of Five (1999–2000). In 2000, Mitra had a small role in the film Hollow Man as a neighbour who is raped by Kevin Bacon's character. She had a main role in the medical drama Gideon's Crossing (2001), as Alejandra "Ollie" Klein. Mitra was ranked No. 46 on the Maxim Hot 100 Women of 2001. Mitra then had roles in Ali G Indahouse, Sweet Home Alabama (2002), Stuck on You, and The Life of David Gale (2003) and leading roles in Highwaymen and Spartacus (2004). Mitra appeared in the final season of The Practice (2003) as Tara Wilson, and continued that role into its spin-off Boston Legal (2004–2005) with James Spader, but left not long into the second season. In 2005, Mitra played the role of Kit McGraw during season 3 of Nip/Tuck. Mitra then went on to appear in Skinwalkers (2006), The Number 23 and Shooter (2007).

In 2008, Mitra starred in the lead role of the science fiction/action film Doomsday as Major Eden Sinclair (sometimes mistakenly named in some databases as being Caryn Peterson), and in 2009 went on to star in Underworld: Rise of the Lycans as Sonja, the daughter of the powerful vampire elder Viktor (played by Bill Nighy). While filming, she grew fond of her vampire fangs, even declining to remove them when they could not be seen. "I put those fangs on the first day and I felt they should always have been there; it's strange. So I kept them in through the entire time of shooting, throughout all my dialogue and everything." In 2009, she was nominated for Scream Awards for Best Actress for this role. She also appeared in three episodes of Stargate Universe as Commander Kiva.

She stars in the 2010 Anders Anderson thriller film Stolen, alongside Josh Lucas, Jon Hamm and James Van Der Beek. She portrayed Claire Radcliff in the 2010 ABC supernatural series The Gates. She played Major Rachel Dalton on Cinemax's series Strike Back: Vengeance and Strike Back: Shadow Warfare (2012–2013), replacing Amanda Mealing.

In 2014 and 2015, she played Rachel Scott in the first two seasons of Michael Bay's post-apocalyptic television series, The Last Ship.

In 2017, she portrayed Charlotte in the fourth season of The Strain.

In 2018, Mitra was cast as Mercy Graves in the CW television series Supergirl.

In 2020, Mitra starred in the science fiction film Archive as Simone. She also starred in the science fiction film Skylines as Dr Mal.

In 2023, she joined the film Hounds of War, alongside Frank Grillo, and historical film Prisoners of Paradise. She also stars in the lead role in science-fiction film The Experiment, alongside Famke Janssen and Stefanie Martini, where she plays Captain Ava Stone.

In 2025, she landed the female lead opposite Joel Kinnaman in the 6-hour TNT mini-series High Value Target: The Hunt for Saddam but was later replaced by Lena Góra when Mitra left the series for unknown reasons. She also joined the sword and sorcery film Red Sonja, alongside Matilda Lutz.

== Personal life ==
In 2016, she moved to Uruguay. Her life in Uruguay rescuing horses has been featured in 2023 on the Channel 5 TV show Ben Fogle: New Lives in the Wild. She appeared on an episode of AMC's Ride with Norman Reedus, specifically the Uruguay episode (Season 4, Episode 5), where she joined Norman Reedus for horseback riding, showcasing her life in Uruguay where she cares for numerous horses and lives off the land, a major theme in her post-Hollywood life.

== Filmography ==
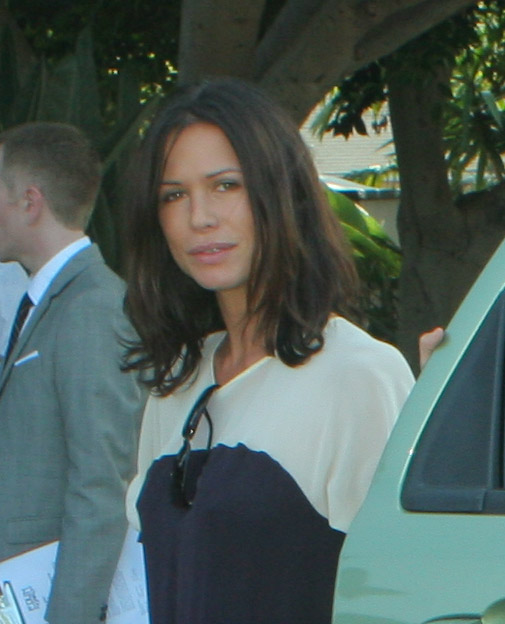
Mitra in 2007

=== Film ===
Year	Title	Role	Notes
1997	Eddie Izzard: Glorious	Groupie	Direct to video Debut
1997	A Kid in Aladdin's Palace	Sheherazade	Direct to video
1998	Croupier	Girl with Joint	
1998	Monk Dawson	Mollie Jolliffe	
1999	How to Breed Gibbons	Juliet	Short film
1999	Beowulf	Kyra	
2000	Hollow Man	Sebastian's Neighbor	
2000	Get Carter	Geraldine	
2002	Ali G Indahouse	Kate Hedges	
2002	Sweet Home Alabama	Tabatha Wadmore-Smith	
2003	The Life of David Gale	Berlin	
2003	Stuck on You	Bus Stop Bombshell	
2004	Highwaymen	Molly Poole	
2006	Skinwalkers	Rachel Talbot	
2007	The Number 23	Laura Tollins	
2007	Shooter	Alourdes Galindo	
2008	Doomsday	Eden Sinclair	
2009	Underworld: Rise of the Lycans	Sonja	Replacing Jázmin Dammak from the first film
2009	Separation City	Katrien Becker	
2009	Stolen	Barbara Adkins	
2010	Reuniting the Rubins	Andie Rubin	
2014	The Loft	Allison Vanowen	
2016	Hard Target 2	Sofia	Direct to video
2018	Game Over, Man!	Erma	
2018	The Fight	Amanda Chadwick	
2020	Archive	Simone	
2020	Skylines	Dr Mal	
2022	The Other Me	Martha	
2024	Shadow Land	Rachel Donnelly	
2024	Hounds of War	Selina	
2025	Red Sonja	Petra	
2025	Ambleside	Betty	
2026	The Experiment	Captain Ava Stone	Post-production
TBA	Mother Knows Best		Post-production

=== Television ===
Year	Title	Role	Notes
1995	The Ghostbusters of East Finchley	Cass	Episode: "1.5"
1996	The Bill	Sarah Wickes	Episode: "Outer"
1997	Lust for Glorious	La Dame Française	TV film
1997	The Man Who Made Husbands Jealous	Flora Seymour	TV miniseries
1999–2000	Party of Five	Holly Marie Beggins	Recurring role (12 episodes)
2000	Secret Agent Man	Lacey Sullivan	Episode: "Supernaked"
2000–2001	Gideon's Crossing	Dr Alejandra Ollie Klein	Main role (20 episodes)
2003–2004	The Practice	Tara Wilson	Main role (22 episodes)
2004	Spartacus	Varinia	TV miniseries
2004	Boston Legal	Tara Wilson	Main role (20 episodes)
2005	Nip/Tuck	Kit McGraw	Recurring role (5 episodes)
2010	Stargate Universe	Commander Kiva	Episodes: "Subversion", "Incursion: Parts 1 & 2"
2010	The Gates	Claire Radcliff	Main role (13 episodes)
2012	Crisis Point	Cameron Grainger	TV film
2012–2013	Strike Back	Maj. Rachel Dalton	Regular role (14 episodes)
2014–2015	The Last Ship	Dr Rachel Scott	Main role (23 episodes)
2017	The Strain	Charlotte	4 episodes
2018	Supergirl	Mercy Graves	Recurring role (4 episodes)
2023	Ben Fogle: New Lives in the Wild	Herself	

=== Video games ===
Year	Title	Role	Notes
1997	Tomb Raider II	Lara Croft	Promotional live-action model
2023	World of Warcraft: Dragonflight	Vyranoth	Voice
TBA	Squadron 42	Executive Officer Sophia Kelly	Voice

== Discography ==
Studio albums

- Come Alive (1998, produced by Dave Stewart)
- Female Icon (1999, produced by Dave Stewart)

Singles

- "Getting Naked" (1997)

Preceded by Nathalie Cook	Lara Croft model 1997–1998	Succeeded by Vanessa Demouy
