= The Assassinated Sun =

2003 film

- Directed by: Abdelkrim Bahloul
- Screenplay by: Abdelkrim Bahloul; Charlotte Guigue; Jean-Pierre Péroncel-Hugoz
- Produced by: Martine de Clermont-Tonnerre; Dardenne brothers
- Starring: Charles Berling; Mehdi Dehbi
- Cinematography: Charles Van Damme
- Edited by: Jacques Witta; Pierre Didier
- Music by: Jean-Marie Sénia
- Release date: 2003
- Language: French

The Assassinated Sun (French: Le Soleil assassiné) is a 2003 drama film co-written and directed by Abdelkrim Bahloul. A biographical portrait of the Algerian poet Jean Sénac, it premiered at the 60th edition of the Venice Film Festival, in the Upstream sidebar. It won the Sebastiane Award at the 51st San Sebastián International Film Festival.

== Cast ==
- Charles Berling as Jean Sénac
- Mehdi Dehbi as Hamid
- Alexis Loret as Belkacem
- Abbes Zahmani as Othmane
- Julia Maraval as Keltoum
- Clotilde de Bayser as Nathalie
- Lotfi Abdelli as Zine
- Ouassini Embarek as Belkacem
- Hichem Rostom as Bramsi
- Fethi Haddaoui as the interrogated man
