= Love Burns =

- Directed by: Davide Ferrario
- Written by: Davide Ferrario
- Starring: Giuseppe Cederna; Elena Sofia Ricci
- Cinematography: Gherardo Gossi
- Music by: Ivo Papasov
- Release date: 1994
- Running time: 91 minutes
- Country: Italy
- Language: Italian

Love Burns (Italian: Anime fiammeggianti) is a 1994 Italian comedy film written and directed by Davide Ferrario. It was screened at the 51st Venice International Film Festival, in the Panorama section.

== Plot ==
Rosario, a philosophy professor in crisis for the end of his marriage, begins - pushed by the Virgin Mary who appears to him constantly - to enjoy life by committing all sorts of crimes. Thanks to his personality change, Rosario will be able to reconnect with his beloved wife.

== Cast ==
- Giuseppe Cederna as Rosario
- Elena Sofia Ricci as Elena
- Alessandro Haber as Salvatore
- Monica Scattini as Virgin Mary
- Flavio Bonacci as Bussotti
- Doris von Thury as Amelia
- Raffaele Fallica as Il Preside
- Massimo Ghini as Proprietario della Mercedes
- Maria Amelia Monti as Proprietaria della Mercedes
- Roberto Citran as The Betrayed Husband
- Elisabetta Cavallotti as La ragazza scippata
- Dario Parisini as Carabiniere
- Mariella Valentini as The Woman who Spleeps

== See also ==
- List of Italian films of 1994
