= Saimir (film) =

2004 drama film

- Directed by: Francesco Munzi
- Screenplay by: Francesco Munzi; Serena Brugnolo; Dino Gentili
- Produced by: Cristiano Bortone; Daniele Mazzocca; Gianluca Arcopinto
- Cinematography: Vladan Radovic
- Edited by: Roberto Missiroli
- Music by: Giuliano Taviani
- Distributed by: Istituto Luce
- Release date: 2004
- Languages: Italian; Albanian

Saimir is a 2004 Italian drama film co-written and directed by Francesco Munzi, in his feature film debut. It premiered at the 61st Venice International Film Festival.

== Cast ==
- Mishel Manoku as Saimir
- Lavinia Guglielman as Michela
- Xhevdet Ferri as Edmond
- Anna Ferruzzo as Simona
- Anita Kravos as Mira

== Release ==
The film premiered in the Orizzonti section at the 61st edition of the Venice Film Festival, in which it received a Lion of the Future special mention.

== Reception ==
Variety's critic Jay Weissberg praised the film, describing it as an "engrossing character study of a teen struggling to find the proper path [that] doesn't wipe away stereotypes so much as plumbs them for the truths beyond the archetype, though occasionally hampered by commonplace dialogue".

For this film Munzi won a Nastro d'Argento Award for Best New Director and received a David di Donatello nomination in the same category and a European Film Award nomination as European Discovery of the Year.
