= Elisabetta Cavallotti =

Italian actress

Elisabetta Cavallotti (born 1 July 1967 in Bologna, Italy) is an Italian actress.

== Career ==
After her theatre debut in 1982 in Luigi Pirandello's La Patente (The License), Cavallotti worked mainly in cinema. She acted in Graduates (1995), Guardami (1999), and Bad Inclinations (2003). She appeared in TV series such as Don Matteo, Un Posto Al Sole (the first soap opera filmed in Italy) and Capri. In 1999, in Guardami, directed by Davide Ferrario, some scenes of non-simulated sex struck public opinion and critics. The actress termed "the star of the day at the Venice Film Festival" declared her discomfort in filming them: "It's not fun to film porn, but it was a challenge." "However, I don't have the feeling that my film was used for commercial purposes." Guardami was presented in competition at the David di Donatello. In 2021 she appeared in Si Vive Una Volta Sola.

In September2020, she won the Reggio Calabria Film Fest as best leading actress for La Guerra a Cuba. The film was presented at festivals and reviews, including the Los Angeles Italia Film Festival. She is a descendant of politician and poet Felice Cavallotti.
