= This Is Not Paradise =

- Directed by: Gianluca Maria Tavarelli
- Written by: Gianluca Maria Tavarelli; Leonardo Fasoli
- Produced by: Maurizio Pastrovich
- Starring: Fabrizio Gifuni
- Cinematography: Pietro Sciortino
- Edited by: Marco Spoletini
- Music by: Ezio Bosso
- Release date: 2000
- Running time: 92 minutes
- Country: Italy
- Language: Italian

This Is Not Paradise (Italian: Qui non è il paradiso) is a 2000 Italian neo-noir film written and directed by Gianluca Maria Tavarelli and starring Fabrizio Gifuni. It is loosely based on actual events happened in Turin in 1996.

It was nominated for two Silver Ribbons, for best screenplay and best original story.

== Plot ==
Renato and his best friend Walter live two unsatisfied lives. The two decide that the only way they can ever change for the better is by robbing a postal van and escape to Costa Rica. Their plan would be perfect were it not for an especially determined police commissioner called Lucidi. Lucidi retraces Renato and Walter's steps and reconstructs Renato's miserable life bit by bit.

== Cast ==
- Fabrizio Gifuni as Renato Sapienza
- Valerio Binasco as Wallter Taranto
- Antonio Catania as Commissioner Lucidi
- Erika Bernardi as Claudia
- Riccardo Zinna as Inspector Esposito
- Ugo Conti as Enzo Pace
- Adriano Pappalardo as Michele Manzo
- Riccardo Montanaro as Donato Catena
- Franco Neri as Vito Vitale

== See also ==
- List of Italian films of 2000
