= Highwaymen (film) =

2004 action thriller film

- Theatrical release poster
- Directed by: Robert Harmon
- Written by: Craig Mitchell; Hans Bauer
- Produced by: Mike Marcus; Carroll Kemp; Bradley Jenkel; Avi Lerner
- Starring: Jim Caviezel; Rhona Mitra; Colm Feore; Andrea Roth; Frankie Faison
- Cinematography: Rene Ohashi
- Edited by: Chris Pepper
- Music by: Mark Isham
- Production companies: New Line Cinema; Millennium Films; Cornice Entertainment
- Distributed by: New Line Cinema
- Release date: February 13, 2004
- Running time: 80 minutes
- Countries: Canada; United States
- Language: English
- Box office: $2.3 million

Highwaymen is a 2004 action thriller film directed by Robert Harmon. An American-Canadian production, it stars Jim Caviezel, Rhona Mitra, Frankie Faison, and Colm Feore. The score was composed by Mark Isham. The film was released on 13 February 2004.

== Plot ==
A man named Rennie Cray is motivated by revenge to track down and kill the man who ran over his wife, a serial killer immobilized by the man himself. The killer uses a wheelchair. He drives a 1972 Cadillac Eldorado to stalk and kill his victims in car accidents. When the serial killer makes a young woman his next target, the man has to stop the killer once and for all.

== Cast ==
- Jim Caviezel as Renford James "Rennie" Cray
- Rhona Mitra as Molly Poole
- Colm Feore as Fargo
- Gordon Currie as Ray Boone
- Frankie Faison as Will Macklin
- Andrea Roth as Alexandra Alex Farrow
- Noam Jenkins as Kelt

== Reception ==
On Rotten Tomatoes, the film holds an approval rating of 13% based on 15 reviews, with a weighted average rating of 3.2/10.

Anna Smith from Empire gave the film 2/5 stars, writing, "Both the well-choreographed crash scenes and the gritty cinematography hint at a better film. Shame no-one took the time to make it." Jamie Russell from BBC awarded the film 1/5 stars, calling it "a five-lane pileup on the freeway to hell". Mark Savlov from Austin Chronicle gave the film 2/5 stars, stating that the film "lacks the sprawling, Westernized mythos of The Hitcher and feels, in the end, like a previously owned nightmare sorely in need of a new universal hell joint."
