= Another South =

- Film poster
- Directed by: Gianluca Maria Tavarelli
- Written by: Gianluca Maria Tavarelli; Leonardo Fasoli; Angelo Carbone
- Produced by: Carlo Degli Esposti; Nicola Serra
- Starring: Isabella Ragonese; Francesco Scianna; Mehdi Dehbi
- Cinematography: Marco Pieroni
- Music by: Pietro Leveratto
- Release date: August 24, 2014
- Running time: 109 minutes
- Language: Italian

Another South (Italian: Una storia sbagliata) is a 2014 Italian romance-drama film written and directed by Gianluca Maria Tavarelli and starring Isabella Ragonese. It was the first film in Italy to be simultaneously released through the streaming services and in theaters.

== Cast ==
- Isabella Ragonese as Stefania
- Francesco Scianna as Roberto
- Mehdi Dehbi as Khaleed
- Stefania Orsola Garello
- Nello Mascia
- Pietro De Silva
- Yessmine Ouni
- Salima Al Wadi

== See also ==
- List of Italian films of 2014
