= Prisoners of Paradise =

British romantic drama film

- Directed by: Mitch Jenkins
- Screenplay by: Mitch Jenkins; Jason Wingard; Alan Govinden
- Based on: Prisoner of Paradise by Romesh Gunsekara
- Produced by: Alan Govinden; Maria Govinden; Paula Crickard
- Starring: Ellie Bamber; Rhona Mitra; Rupert Penry-Jones; Mehdi Dehbi
- Production companies: AMG International Film; Atelier 11
- Release date: 2025
- Country: United Kingdom
- Language: English

Prisoners of Paradise is a 2026 British period drama romance film directed by Mitch Jenkins and starring Ellie Bamber. It is adapted from the novel Prisoner of Paradise by Romesh Gunsekara. It was previously known as Ambleside.

== Premise ==
A young woman in 1925 is sent to Mauritius to be under the guardianship of her uncle, and begins a forbidden love affair with a local plantation worker.

== Cast ==
- Ellie Bamber as Lucy Gladwell
- Rhona Mitra as Betty
- Rupert Penry-Jones as George Huyton
- Mehdi Dehbi as Krishna
- Edward Akrout as Antoine
- JJ Feild
- Amy Beth Hayes as Mina

== Production ==
The film is produced by AMG International Film and Atelier 11. It is directed by Mitch Jenkins. Jenkins co-wrote the script with Jason Wingard and Alan Govinden, adapted from the Romesh Gunsekara novel Prisoner of Paradise (2012). It is produced by Alan Govinden, Paula Crickard and Maria Govinden. In 2025, Signature Entertainment bought distribution rights in the United Kingdom and Ireland.

The cast is led by Ellie Bamber with Rhona Mitra, Rupert Penry-Jones and Mehdi Dehbi with Edward Akrout, JJ Feild and Amy Beth Hayes.

Principal photography took place on location in Mauritius.

== Release ==
The film has its world premiere at the Boston Film Festival on 22 September 2025.
