= Guardami =

- Directed by: Davide Ferrario
- Written by: Davide Ferrario
- Cinematography: Giovanni Cavallini
- Music by: Giorgio Canali
- Release dates: September 7, 1999 (VFF); September 10, 1999 (Italy)
- Country: Italy
- Language: Italian

Guardami is a 1999 Italian film written and directed by Davide Ferrario.

The film premiered at the 56th Venice International Film Festival. It is loosely based on the life of Moana Pozzi. Guardami features some explicit sex scenes that caused a slight controversy at the time.

== Cast ==
- Elisabetta Cavallotti as Nina
- Stefania Orsola Garello as Cristiana
- Flavio Insinna as Flavio
- Gianluca Gobbi as Dario
- Claudio Spadaro as Baroni
- Luigi Diberti as Castellani
- Angelica Ippolito as Nina's mother
- Yorgo Voyagis as Nina's father
- Antonello Grimaldi as Joe
- Luis Molteni as Max
- Luca Damiano as himself
- Vladimir Luxuria as presenter

== Production ==
Cavallotti chose the actor to shoot the unsimulated fellatio scene. "I chose Alex Mantegna because he wasn't too endowed. He was kind, but when I explained why I wanted him, he was offended", she said.

The scene in which Cavallotti performs on stage was not shot in the studio but directly during an erotic event called Mi Sex. The audience and the guys who takes the stage are not extras but normal people who were there for the event. They did not know that a movie was being made and Cavallotti behaved like one of the many performers who went up on stage to perform.

Cavallotti said she thought that if she had a boyfriend, she wouldn't have done the movie, because "I wouldn't be able to go back to him after having been naked among the naked bodies of men and women, after having taken strangers' dicks in my mouth, having had who knows how many hands on me."
