= Massimo Dapporto =

Italian actor and voice actor (born 1945)

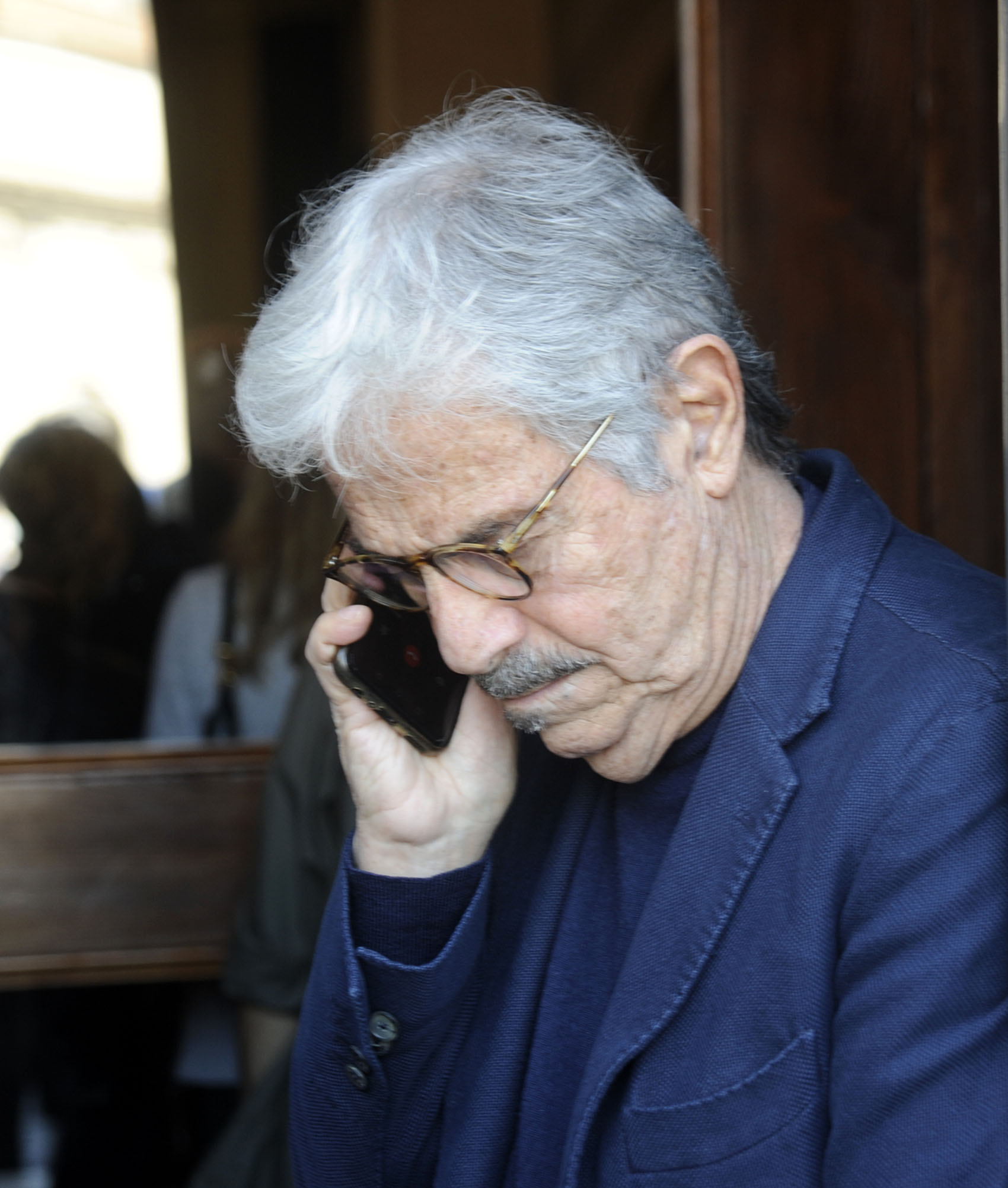
- Dapporto in 2024
- Born: 8 August 1945 (age 80); Milan, Italy
- Occupations: Actor; voice actor; dialogue writer
- Years active: 1973–present
- Spouse: Stefania Longo (m. 1971)
- Children: Davide Dapporto
- Father: Carlo Dapporto

Massimo Dapporto (born 8 August 1945) is an Italian actor and voice actor.

== Biography ==
Born in Milan, the son of the actor and comedian Carlo Dapporto, he studied acting at the Silvio D'Amico National Academy of Dramatic Arts. Dapporto began his career in the 1970s and found professional opportunities in the small screen, where he starred in TV-series and mini-series of great success, notably the medical drama Amico mio and he even played the role of Emperor Claudius in the Imperium movie Nero.

In 1989, he won a David di Donatello for best supporting actor for his performance in Francesca Archibugi's Mignon Has Come to Stay.

In his profession as a voice actor, Dapporto dubbed characters into the Italian language. He served as the Italian voice of Buzz Lightyear in the Toy Story films as well as dubbing Tim Curry, Michael Keaton, John Goodman, Pierre Arditi, Patrick Stewart, Joe Mantegna and Cheech Marin in some of their movies.

=== Personal life ===
Dapporto is the father of director Davide Dapporto. He has also been married to Stefania Longo since 1971. He considers himself Catholic but he believes in reincarnation.

== Filmography ==
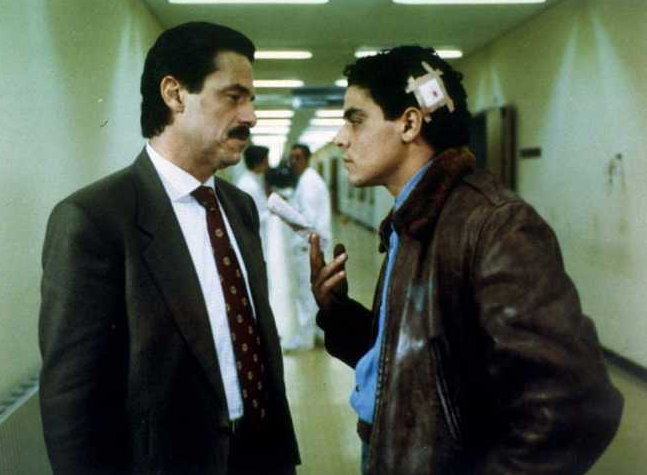
Dapporto (left) and Francesco Benigno in The Last Breath (1992)

=== Cinema ===
- Il trafficone (1974)
- Goodnight, Ladies and Gentlemen (1976)
- Nerone (1976)
- Hunted City (1979)
- Soldati - 365 all'alba (1987)
- Il mistero del panino assassino (1987)
- Tenerezza (1987)
- The Family (1987)
- Mignon Has Come to Stay (1988)
- Disamistade (1989)
- Rouge Venise (1989)
- Tre colonne in cronaca (1990)
- L'alba (1990)
- Traces of an Amorous Life (1990)
- Ma non per sempre (1991)
- A Simple Story (1991)
- Ultimo respiro (1992)
- Per non dimenticare (1992)
- State Secret (1995)
- Marching in Darkness (1996)
- Celluloide (1996)
- Anni Ribelli (1996)
- Con rabbia e con amore (1997)
- L'apparenza (2003)
- Nicola, lì dove sorge il sole (2006)

=== Television ===
- All'ultimo minuto (1973)
- Nucleo centrale investigativo (1974)
- Sarti Antonio brigadiere (1978)
- Il mercante di Venezia (1979)
- Anna Kuliscioff (1981)
- Storia d'amore e d'amicizia (1982)
- Uno + uno (1983)
- Mussolini and I (1985)
- Il boss (1986)
- Diventerò padre (1987)
- Come una mamma (1990)
- Non siamo soli (1991)
- Una madre come tu (1993)
- Amico mio (1993–1998)
- Una bambina di troppo (1995)
- Mio padre è innocente (1997)
- Un prete tra noi (1997–1999)
- Mio figlio ha 70 anni (1999)
- Ciao professore (1999)
- Per amore per vendetta (2001)
- Casa famiglia (2001–2003)
- Il commissario (2002)
- Nero (2004)
- Giovanni Falcone - L'uomo che sfidò Cosa Nostra (2006)
- Distretto di Polizia (2007)
- Il generale dei briganti (2012)
- Mister Ignis - L'operaio che fondò un impero (2013)
- Luisa Spagnoli (2016)

== Voice work ==
- The Prince of Dinosaurs (Italian: Il principe dei dinosauri) - Animated film (2003) - Braveheart
- Fukushima: A Nuclear Story - Documentary (2016) - Narrator

=== Dubbing roles ===
==== Animation ====
- Buzz Lightyear in Toy Story, Buzz Lightyear / Utility Belt Buzz in Toy Story 2, Lightyear in Toy Story 3, Toy Story 4, Buzz Lightyear of Star Command: The Adventure Begins, Toy Story of Terror!, Hawaiian Vacation, Small Fry, Buzz Light Car in Cars
- Shaggy Rogers in Scooby-Doo (2nd voice)
- Warren T. Rat in An American Tail
- Heathcliff in Heathcliff

==== Live action ====
- Mr. Hector in Home Alone 2: Lost in New York
- Walter Garfield in The Monuments Men
- Bill Blazejowski in Night Shift
- Stan Starkey in Maid to Order
- Cheech Marin in Cheech and Chong's Next Movie
- Jean Passepartout in Around the World in 80 Days
- Maitre d' at L'Idiot in L.A. Story
- Quon in One of Our Dinosaurs Is Missing
- Joe Gipp in Adventures in Babysitting
