= Declarations of Love =

- Directed by: Pupi Avati
- Written by: Pupi Avati
- Cinematography: Cesare Bastelli
- Edited by: Amedeo Salfa
- Music by: Stefano Caprioli
- Release date: 1994
- Language: Italian

Declarations of Love (Italian: Dichiarazioni d'amore) is a 1994 Italian drama film written and directed by Pupi Avati. The film premiered out of competition at the 51st Venice International Film Festival.

== Cast ==
- Alessio Modica as Dado
- Carlotta Miti as Sandra
- Antonella Attili as Gaby
- Delia Boccardo as Adult Sandra
- Carlo Delle Piane as the Superintendent
- Valeria Fabrizi as Piera
- Ivano Marescotti as Professor Colli
