= Deceit (1999 film) =

- Directed by: Claudia Florio
- Written by: David Ambrose; Roger Deutsch; Claudia Florio
- Produced by: Sergio Castellani; Carlos Pasini Hansen
- Starring: Jonathan Pryce; Susan Lynch; Claudia Gerini
- Cinematography: Luciano Tovoli
- Edited by: Claudio M. Cutry
- Music by: Luis Bacalov
- Production company: Cinecitta
- Distributed by: Adriana Chiesa Enterprises
- Release date: September 1, 1999
- Running time: 90 min.
- Country: Italy
- Language: English/Italian

Deceit (Italian: Il gioco) is a 1999 English-Italian mystery film.

== Production ==
The working title was Commedia.

== Cast ==
- Jonathan Pryce as Mark
- Susan Lynch as Corinna
- Claudia Gerini as Michela
- Enrico Silvestrin as Tino
- Alessandra Acciai as Fiammetta
- Brian Protheroe
- Dario Bergesio as Ragazzo Galleria
- Fionnula Flanagan
