= Stefania Orsola Garello =

Italian actress

- Born: 31 December 1963 (age 62); Arcisate, Varese, Italy
- Occupation: Actress

Stefania Orsola Garello (born 31 December 1963) is an Italian stage, television and film actress.

== Life and career ==
Born in Arcisate, Italy, ito a family of Piedmontese origins, Garello spent a large part of her adolescence in the United States.

Returned to Italy, she graduated from the Alberto Blandi drama school under Massimo Scaglione, and made her professional debut in 1985. She was mainly active on stage and on television, in TV-movies and series. Her film career mainly consists of art films and independent productions.

== Filmography ==
Year	Title	Role	Notes
1989	The Story of Boys & Girls	Antonia	
1992	Prima le donne e i bambini		
1994	Take Me Away	Cinzia	
1996	A forma di cuore		
1997	The Chambermaid on the Titanic	Mimi	
1997	Cosa c'entra con l'amore	Laura	
1998	Vite in sospeso		
1998	Interferenze	Stella	
1999	Guardami	Cristiana	
2000	Nora	Signorina Canarutto	
2000	Due come noi, non dei migliori	Ivana	
2002	Heaven	Vendice's Secretary	
2002	Quello che cerchi	Rosa	
2002	Bimba - È clonata una stella	Addetta alle pubbliche relazioni	
2003	Tre punto sei	Nanà	
2003	At the End of the Night		
2004	King Arthur	Fulcinia	
2006	Bye Bye Berlusconi!	Pietros Frau	
2007	Scrivilo sui muri	Madre Bronks	
2014	Another South		
2017	The Music of Silence	Maestro's Wife	
