= Vlora (ship) =

Albanian cargo ship involved in 1991 refugee crisis

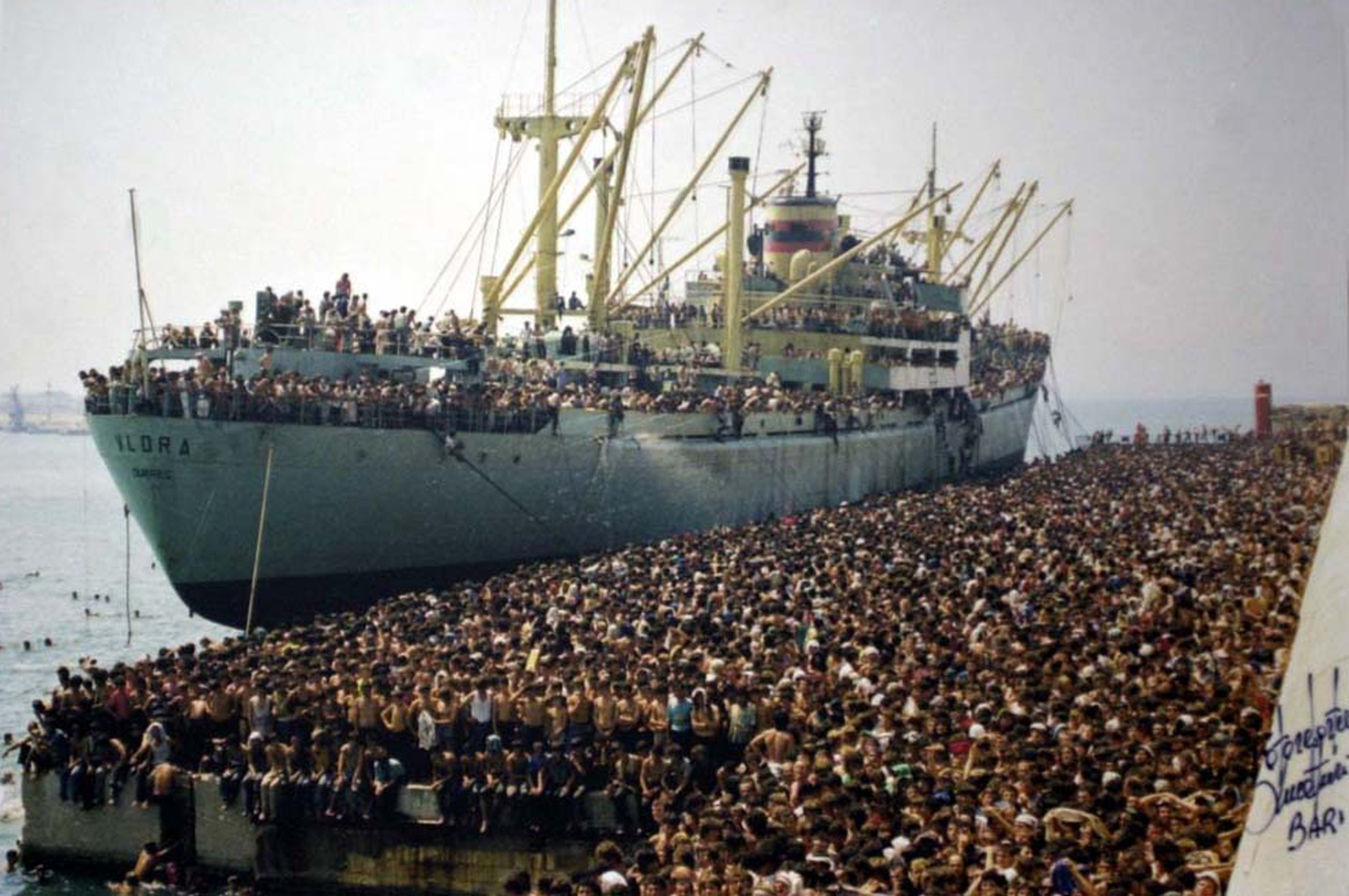
- Refugees from the Vlora (background) in Bari's port (Italy) on 8 August 1991

History

Albania
- Name: Vlora
- Namesake: Vlorë
- Owner: DrejtFlot (Albanian State Shipping Enterprise)
- Port of registry: Durrës, Albania
- Builder: Cantieri Navali Riuniti, Ancona
- Laid down: 10 August 1959
- Launched: 4 May 1960
- Out of service: 17 August 1997
- Identification: Radio call sign "ZADV"
- Fate: Scrapped 1996

General characteristics
- Class & type: General Cargo: single-decker
- Tonnage: 8,649 GRT
- Displacement: 5,162 tons
- Length: 147.7 m (485 ft)
- Beam: 19.15 m (62.8 ft)
- Installed power: 7500 hp
- Speed: 17 kn (31 km/h; 20 mph)

The Vlora was a cargo ship built in 1960 in Ancona (Italy) that sailed under the Albanian flag until 1996. It is most famous for carrying tens of thousands of Albanian refugees to the Italian port of Bari on 8 August 1991, an unprecedented mass arrival that caught Italian authorities unaware.

== History ==
=== Construction ===
The ship was built in the Cantieri Navali Riuniti of Ancona in Italy by the Società Ligure di Armamento (based in Genoa). Originally bearing the name Ilice, it was a sister ship to the Ninny Figari, the Sunpalermo and the Fineo. Launched on 4 May 1960 and placed into service on 16 June of the same year, it was sold in 1961 to the government controlled Joint Sino-Albanian Shipping Company, who based it in Durrës under Albanian flag and renamed it the Vlora.

=== Voyage to Bari (1991) ===
==== Background ====
The fall of communism in Albania in the early 1990s gave way to a major economic collapse (with severe food shortages) amid widespread political and social unrest in the country. This incited many Albanians to try and leave the previously isolated nation. Many Albanians fled to Greece in the south, while some ethnic Slavs tried to cross into northern neighbour Yugoslavia. In Tirana foreign embassies were stormed (mainly unsuccessfully) after rumours spread of visas being handed out. Up to 3,000 Albanians managed to enter the compound of the German embassy while some successfully entered the Czechoslovak embassy grounds. The ones in the German embassy were eventually allowed to leave to Germany via Italy.

Many of the emigrants decided on Italy, less than a hundred miles away across the Strait of Otranto. Exaggerated portrayals of wealth in Italian television adverts that Albanians had access to partly motivated this choice. Earlier in 1991 a number of crossings were attempted by hundreds or thousands of Albanian refugees who forcefully commandeered different vessels, from Romanian freighters to Albanian navy tugboats. The overrun harbor security forces in Durrës or Vlora could only look on helplessly. One such crossing on 7 March had seen around 20,000 immigrants land in Brindisi on a number of small vessels. The city of only 80,000 had found itself struggling to cope with such an influx, yet the inhabitants generously provided food and shelter and the immigrants were generally well received.

==== Boarding the ship (7 August) ====
The Vlora had returned from Cuba with a load of sugar, its main engines were out of use and it docked in Durrës to unload its cargo and go through repairs. Meanwhile, throngs of people had gathered in the port from around the country in the hope of boarding any ship and sail to Italy. Without anyone to stop them, thousands of them (between 10,000 and over 20,000 according to reports) boarded the Vlora on 7 August 1991. They jumped in the sea and climbed aboard on ropes, filling virtually every inch of the ship (some hanging from ladders for most of the voyage). The captain, Halim Milaqi, was unable to reason the stowaways—some of whom were armed—out of their plan. He decided to sail the overcrowded boat for Italy, fearful of what could happen if amateurs were to commandeer the ship.

==== Crossing into Italy (8 August) ====
Sailing with only its auxiliary motors, without a radar (due to passenger presence) and with excess weight, the ship also lost its cooling tubes after passengers cut them open to try and hydrate themselves, with the captain then using seawater to avoid melting the motor. They benefited from calm weather and arrived on Italian shores in the early hours of 8 August. Approaching Brindisi's port at around 4 a.m., the captain was advised against docking in the city by the police's vice-prefect. The city was still coming to terms with the thousands of Albanians who had arrived in March or in between and didn't have the capacity to absorb more.

The ship's captain then changed course to Bari, only 55 miles away, which the incapacitated ship took seven hours to reach. During that time, little had been done by the Italian authorities to prepare for this mass arrival. Both the police prefect and the superintendent were on holiday while the mayor's office was only notified when the ship was already in the port. An attempt was made to blockade the port's entrance using small ships and the navy frigate Euro to try and constrain the captain to return to Albania. Citing the worsening conditions on board the ship, after passengers had spent 36 hours with virtually no food or water in stifling heat, Milaqi refused to back down. He entered the port, communicating that he had injured people aboard and he could not mechanically turn around. The Vlora was made to dock at the quay furthest away from the city centre usually reserved for coal unloading. Whilst in the port scores of its passengers jumped into the water and swam to the shore or climbed down ropes while it was mooring, with many disappearing into the city.

==== Stadium confinement and clashes (8 August) ====
The Italian government's hard-line policy, expressed by Interior Minister Vincenzo Scotti, was to stop refugee ships from landing on Italian shores and otherwise deporting immigrants straight away. As such, the Vlora's passengers did not disembark to a warm welcome. Orders from Rome called for them to be kept in the port, with little to no material help, and ferried back to Albania within days if not hours. When the improbability of such a plan emerged, other measures were haphazardly put in place, some of the injured (a few caused by the unrelenting sun) were taken by ambulance to hospital, as were a number of heavily pregnant women, the mayor Enrico Dalfino and vice-prefect Giuseppe Cisternino organised the distribution of water.

Despite doubts expressed by Dalfino, the authorities started busing the immigrants from around midday to the Stadio della Vittoria, an out of use stadium, where they would be kept until their deportation. By the afternoon the Albanians had understood that they were ultimately to be sent home, groups of them tried to force their way through the police cordon surrounding the stadium. With many managing to escape, the authorities then decided to stop bringing anyone to the stadium and close the gates, locking them inside. The situation spun further out of control, the stadium's groundsman was effectively held hostage until the intervention of the mayor, personnel supervising the fair handling out of food were assaulted and the police then evacuated the stadium. It became a lawless zone controlled by the most violent elements (some armed with firearms). Food and water was literally thrown over the wall by the authorities using a fire truck crane, which meant it was mostly appropriated by the before-mentioned thugs.

The night saw the tension flare up even more, with clashes between the police and Albanians trying (and succeeding for some) to break through the cordon. The police, who had a number of projectiles thrown at them, opened fire, some Albanians were treated for gunshot wounds. According to the police—who themselves had members injured by projectiles—these wounds were caused by prior infighting in the stadium.

After a brief respite, the cat and mouse game between the Albanians trying to escape and the authorities started anew on Friday morning. Some 3,000 Albanians managed to bust the gates open and make a rush for it, with over 200 resulting injuries, including around 20 policemen. Whilst hundreds of refugees managed to escape—some hiding in the Fiera del Levante exhibition pavilions—around 2,000 were surrounded by police outside the stadium. They progressively transferred the escapees to the port in spite of their sometimes violent resistance.

The situation inside the stadium neared boiling point, with some Albanians reportedly looting vehicles before driving them recklessly inside the stadium, panicking their compatriots. A small group also set fire to a Red Cross office and a garage at the stadium causing material damage according to Red Cross officials.

==== Deportation through all means (9–16 August) ====
Meanwhile, the Italian authorities had finally been able to organise their response to the refugee crisis. They requisitioned private ferries to transport them back to Albania, where they also sent two navy ships to help with disembarkation. The first—the Tiziano—arrived on the 9th. Some of the most refractive elements were taken to the airport and flown back to Albania with military C-130's in groups of around 60 (escorted by as many policemen). By mid-afternoon, around 3,000 had been repatriated, some left voluntarily as the hostile reception and poor conditions had left them disillusioned about life in Italy. To ease the evacuation, most were told lies, with the ships and planes supposed to take them to other Italian cities.

The outgoing flow of refugees hastened with the arrival of two other ferries, the Espresso Grecia and the Malta, two days later. By the 11th, around 3,000 Albanians still remained in Bari's stadium, mostly the hard-line faction who refused to be convinced by the authorities say-so. The police chief Vincenzo Parisi convinced a number to leave with the offer of new clothes and 50,000 lire (a considerable sum in Albania at the time). After three days, the remaining hold-backs were told they had won the right to stay in Italy. However, as soon as they exited the stadium they were put into buses and taken to the airport, from where they were flown directly to Tirana. This led the press to title that the "Albanian invasion" had been ended on 16 August.

==== Reactions ====
Visiting the port and stadium on 10 August, Bishop Antonio Bello was scandalised by the dire conditions he found the Albanians in. It prompted him to write an article in Avvenire denouncing the authorities, chief of which the minister of interior and the head of the Protezione civile, for treating them like animals.

==== Outcome ====
With the media attention highlighting the dire situation in Albania, that country's authorities, pressured by Italy, put its ports under military control and halted all passenger trains to stem flow of emigrants. At the same time the Italian government offered to help the country financially (to the tune of $9 million in food) if Albania helped rein in and take back the immigrants leaving for Italy.

Though undocumented immigration from Albania continued thereafter, it lessened in scale and was mostly organised by criminal gangs. They used fast motorboats to cross the strait at night and leave their paying passengers to swim to the shore.

=== Later service ===
According to Milaqi's account, the ship stayed in Bari's port for 45 days before his crew and himself managed to take it back to Albania (it is possible it was towed due to the heavy damage it had sustained). He reportedly continued captaining the cargo ship until December 1994 and the ship was also in operation through 1995. The Vlora was finally de-registered in 1996 and scrapped on 17 August of the same year at a scrapyard in the Turkish port of Aliağa.

== In popular culture ==
- Lamerica (1994) by Gianni Amelio, inspired by this event
- La Nave Dolce (2012) by Daniele Vicari (documentary)
- Crossing (2016), a novel by Pajtin Statovci; English translation by David Hackston (2019)

== Fake news ==
During the European migrant crisis of 2015, a still image of the crowded Vlora was attached to various fake news hoaxes purportedly of contemporary ("Muslim", "Syrian", "terrorist") refugee populations. The image was shared on Belgium's Mouvement Réformateur official Facebook page, and later by conservative U.S. politician Steve King. The same image was circulated purporting to show Europeans fleeing to Africa during World War II.

== See also ==
- Tragedy of Otranto

== Bibliography ==
- Maurizio Albahari: Crimes of Peace: Mediterranean Migrations at the World's Deadliest Border. University of Pennsylvania Press 2015, ISBN 978-0-8122-4747-3.
