= Lamerica =

- Directed by: Gianni Amelio
- Written by: Gianni Amelio, Andrea Porporati, Alessandro Sermoneta
- Produced by: Mario Cecchi Gori
- Starring: Enrico Lo Verso; Michele Placido; Piro Milkani; Carmelo Di Mazzarelli; Elida Janushi; Sefer Pema; Idajet Sejdia; Marieta Ljarja
- Edited by: Simona Paggi
- Music by: Franco Piersanti
- Distributed by: New Yorker Films
- Release date: 9 September 1994
- Running time: 116 minutes
- Countries: Italy; France; Switzerland; Austria
- Languages: Italian; Albanian; English

Lamerica is a 1994 Italian drama film directed by Gianni Amelio. It entered the competition at the 51st Venice International Film Festival, in which Amelio won the Golden Osella for Best Director. The film was selected as the Italian entry for the Best Foreign Language Film at the 67th Academy Awards, but was not accepted as a nominee.

== Plot ==
Italian scam artists Gino and Fiore go to Durrës in post-communist Albania in order to open a shell corporation and pocket state contributions. After discovering that the Albanian figurehead for the corporation is a relative of their go-between, they replace her with Spiro Tozai, an old man taken from a hospice. It is later discovered that Tozai is in reality Michele Talarico, a former Italian soldier who has been in hiding since the Second World War. In his senile state, he is convinced that he is still a 20-year-old recruit and longs to see his son, whom he still thinks is a child.

Talarico wanders off, followed by Gino, who is eventually arrested in Tirana after the shell corporation is exposed. Gino is released, but with his passport confiscated, forcing him to board a ship bound for Italy overflowing with Albanian refugees. He finds Talarico there who, in a state of dementia, believes the ship is heading to America.

== Reception ==
Lamerica has an approval rating of 91% on review aggregator website Rotten Tomatoes, based on 11 reviews, and an average rating of 8/10.

TV Guide gives the film four stars, finding it "A boldly chilling portrait of post-Communist Europe in moral eclipse, directed with passion and singular grace by Italian Gianni Amelio...". Janet Maslin, writing for The New York Times, finds that "The film's synthesis of fact and fiction is gracefully achieved," and expressed hope that after the screening of Lamerica at the 1995 New York Film Festival, Amelio would "emerge ... much more widely known."

The film was heavily criticised by Albanian writer Ismail Kadare for what he perceived as the whitewashing of Italian colonialism, and accused the film of promoting the idea that Albanians dreamed of living under Italian domination.

=== Awards ===
- 1994 European Film Awards – "Best Film"
- 1994 Venice Film Festival – 4 Awards including "Best Director"
- 1995 São Paulo International Film Festival – "Critics Award"
- 1995 David di Donatello: Best Cinematography, Best Score, Best Sound
- 1995 Nastro d'Argento: Best Director, Best Cinematography
- 1995 Goya Awards – Best European Film

== See also ==
- Tirana Year Zero
- Vlora (ship)
- Albanians in Italy
- Movies about immigration to Italy
- List of submissions to the 67th Academy Awards for Best Foreign Language Film
- List of Italian submissions for the Academy Award for Best Foreign Language Film

Awards
Preceded by Urga (Close to Eden)	European Film Award for Best European Film; 1994	Succeeded by Land and Freedom
