= Anni Ribelli =

- Directed by: Rosalia Polizzi
- Written by: Rosalia Polizzi, Mario Prosperi
- Starring: Leticia Brédice, Massimo Dapporto, Esther Goris
- Cinematography: Juan Carlos Lenardi
- Music by: Luis Bacalov
- Release date: 5 December 1996
- Running time: 109 minutes
- Country: Argentina
- Language: Spanish

Anni Ribelli is a 1996 Italian Argentine romantic drama film directed and written by Rosalia Polizzi. The film starred Leticia Brédice, Massimo Dapporto, Esther Goris and Alessandra Acciai. Actress Leticia Brédice won a Silver Condor Award for best actress in 1997 for her performance.

== Synopsis ==
In the 1950s, a teenage girl from Buenos Aires discovers her first love and navigates conflicts with her father, a Sicilian tailor with revolutionary ideas.

== Cast ==
- Massimo Dapporto as Francesco Loiacono
- Leticia Brédice as Laura
- Inda Ledesma as Aunt Francesca
- Esther Goris
- Juan Cruz Bordeu
- Alessandra Acciai as Dora Dalmonte
- Eva Burgos
- Daniel Tedeschi
- Adelaide Alessi as Grandmother
- Vera Czemerinski as Alumna ejemplar
- Vanina Fabiak
- Jorge García Marino
- Esther Gross as Giulietta
- Pablo Patlis as Mimi
- Alexis Puig as Militar
- Adriana Russo

== Release ==
The film premiered in Argentina on 6 September 1996.
