= Take Me Away (film) =

- Directed by: Gianluca Maria Tavarelli
- Written by: Gianluca Maria Tavarelli; Leonardo Fasoli
- Produced by: Gianluca Arcopinto
- Starring: Stefania Orsola Garello
- Cinematography: Pietro Sciortino
- Edited by: Marco Spoletini
- Music by: Paolo Lasazio
- Release date: 1994
- Running time: 97 minutes
- Country: Italy
- Language: Italian

Take Me Away (Italian: Portami via) is a 1994 Italian romance-drama film written and directed by Gianluca Maria Tavarelli, at his directorial debut.

== Cast ==
- Stefania Orsola Garello as Cinzia
- France Demoulin as Cristina
- Michele Di Mauro as Luigi
- Fabrizio Monetti as Paolo
- Sergio Troiano as Alberto

== See also ==
- List of Italian films of 1994
