= Davide Ferrario =

Italian actor, film director, screenwriter and writer

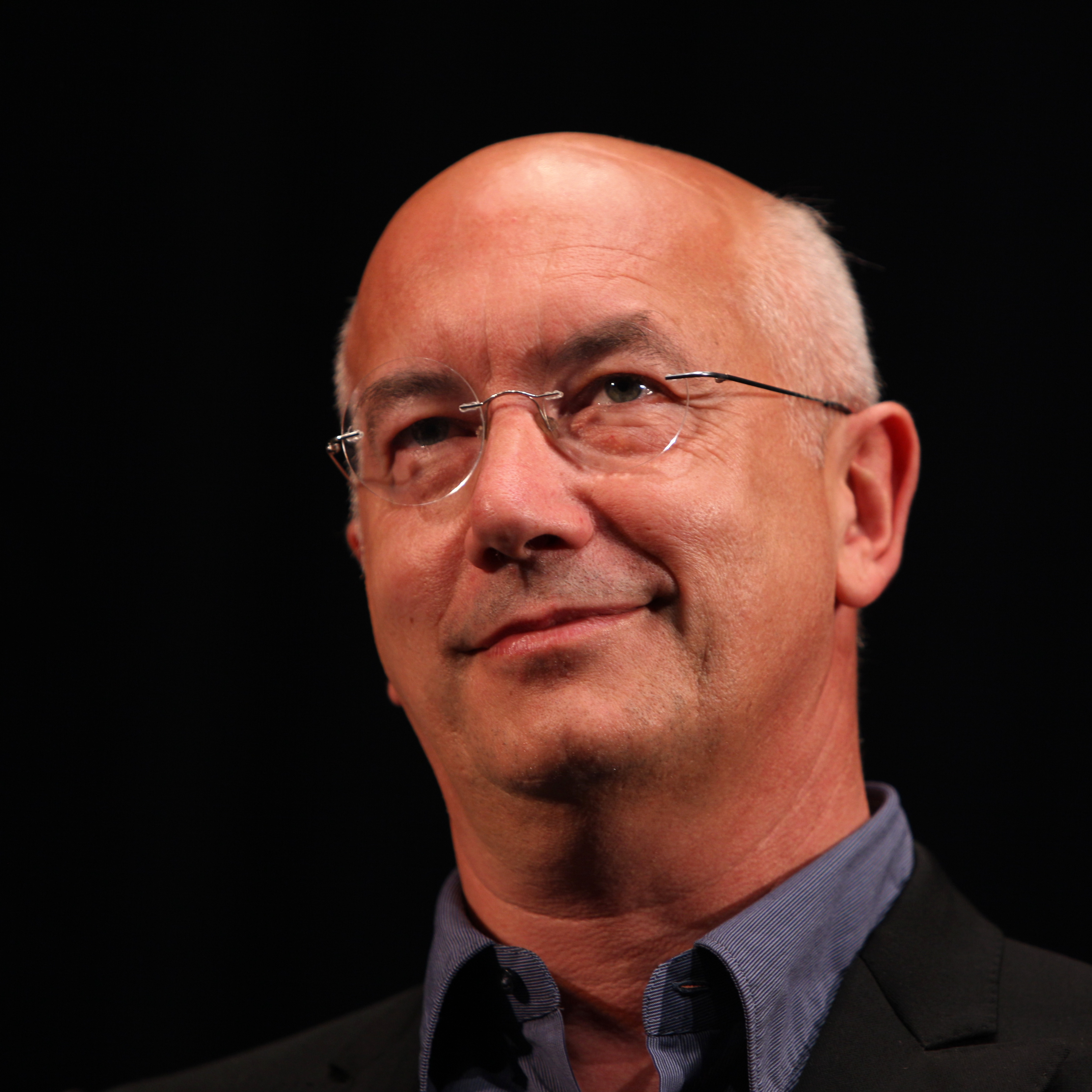
- Born: 26 June 1956 (age 70); Casalmaggiore, Cremona, Italy
- Occupations: Italian film director, screenwriter and author

Davide Ferrario (born 26 June 1956) is an Italian film director, screenwriter and author.

== Life and career ==
Born in Casalmaggiore, Cremona, Ferrario graduated in Anglo-American literature, then he began to work in film distribution, and he contributed to import in Italy many indie films by John Sayles, Jim Jarmusch, Susan Seidelman, Godfrey Reggio. He also collaborated as a film critic with the cinema magazine Cineforum, and he wrote a monograph about Rainer Werner Fassbinder.

After collaborating on several screenplays, Ferrario made his directorial debut in 1987 with the short film Non date da mangiare agli animali, and in 1989 he directed his first feature film, the neo-noir The End of the Night. His 2004 film After Midnight entered the Forum section at the 54th Berlin International Film Festival, in which Ferrario won the Caligari Film Prize and the Don Quixote Award. Also a novelist, his 1995 debut novel Dissolvenza al nero was later adapted into a film, Fade to Black by Oliver Parker.

== Selected filmography ==
- The End of the Night (1989)
- Love Burns (1994)
- We All Fall Down (1997)
- Children of Hannibal (1998)
- Guardami (1999)
- After Midnight (2004)
- Tutta colpa di Giuda (2009)
- Blood on the Crown (2021)
- Umberto Eco - La biblioteca del mondo (2022)
