= The True Life of Antonio H. =

- Directed by: Enzo Monteleone
- Written by: Enzo Monteleone
- Starring: Alessandro Haber
- Cinematography: Arnaldo Catinari
- Edited by: Cecilia Zanuso
- Music by: Mimmo Locasciulli
- Release date: 1994
- Country: Italy
- Language: Italian

La vera vita di Antonio H. (internationally released as The True Life of Antonio H.) is a 1994 Italian mockumentary film directed by Enzo Monteleone and loosely inspired to real life events of Alessandro Haber. For this film Haber won the Silver Ribbon for best actor.

== Cast ==
- Alessandro Haber: Antonio Hutter
- Bernardo Bertolucci: himself
- Giuliana De Sio: herself
- Ennio Fantastichini: himself
- Massimo Ghini: himself
- Nanni Loy: himself
- Marcello Mastroianni: himself
- Mario Monicelli: himself
- Maria Amelia Monti: herself
- Michele Placido: himself
- Gabriele Salvatores: himself
- Paolo Taviani: himself
- Vittorio Taviani: himself
- Adriana Innocenti: Antonio's Mother

== See also ==
- List of Italian films of 1994
