= Oasi (film) =

- Directed by: Cristiano Bortone
- Written by: Cristiano Bortone; Valentina Pascarelli
- Starring: Henry Arnold; Valentina Cervi
- Cinematography: Giovanni Mammolotti
- Music by: Alessandro Molinari
- Release date: 1994
- Country: Italy
- Language: Italian

Oasi (also known as Oasis) is a 1994 Italian romance-drama film written and directed by Cristiano Bortone.

The film was screened out of competition at the 51st edition of the Venice Film Festival.

== Cast ==
- Henry Arnold as Simone
- Valentina Cervi as Claudia
- Francesca Nunzi as Angela
- Valentino Macchi as The Father-in-law
- Alfredo Pea as The Dustman
