= Francesco Munzi =

Italian film director and writer (born 1969)

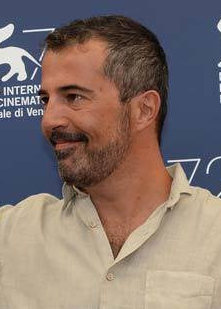
- Munzi in 2016
- Born: 1 September 1969 (age 56); Rome, Italy
- Occupation(s): Film director, screenwriter

Francesco Munzi (born 1 September 1969 in Rome) is an Italian film director and writer. His first film Saimir won as Best debut film at Nastri d'argento, at the Venice International Film Festival and was nominated at the European Film Award and at the David di Donatello. He is best known for the 2014 film Black Souls, which won several awards at the Venice Film Festival and the Best Film, Best Director and Best Script awards at the 60th David di Donatello Awards.
