= Gianluca Maria Tavarelli =

Italian director and screenwriter (born 1964)

- Born: 27 September 1964 (age 61); Turin, Italy
- Occupations: Director; screenwriter

Gianluca Maria Tavarelli (born 27 September 1964) is an Italian director and screenwriter.

== Life and career ==
Born in Turin, Tavarelli was self-taught, initially producing several Super 8 and 16 mm short films. After directing several commercials, shorts and television documentaries, he made his feature film debut in 1994 with Take Me Away, which premiered at the Venice Film Festival and won the Grand Prix at the Annecy Film Festival. In 2001 he received two Nastro d'Argento nominations for the film This Is Not Paradise, for best screenplay and best original story. He has a daughter named Zoe who is an actress.

== Selected filmography ==
- Take Me Away (1994)
- A Love (1999)
- This Is Not Paradise (2000)
- Break Free (2003)
- Don't Make Any Plans for Tonight (2006)
- Another South (2014)
