= Taken (franchise) =

Series of action films

- The DVD cover for the 3-film box set
- Directed by: Pierre Morel (1); Olivier Megaton (2–3)
- Screenplay by: Luc Besson; Robert Mark Kamen
- Produced by: Luc Besson
- Starring: Liam Neeson; Maggie Grace; Famke Janssen; Leland Orser; Jon Gries; David Warshofsky
- Cinematography: Michel Abramowicz (1); Romain Lacourbas (2); Eric Kress (3)
- Edited by: Frédéric Thoraval (1); Camille Delamarre (2); Vincent Tabaillon (2); Audrey Simonaud (3); Nicolas Trembasiewicz (3)
- Music by: Nathaniel Méchaly
- Production companies: Canal+; M6 Films; EuropaCorp
- Distributed by: 20th Century Studios (select territories); EuropaCorp (worldwide)
- Running time: 294 minutes
- Country: France
- Language: English
- Budget: $118,000,000
- Box office: $929,451,015

Taken is a series of English-language French action films, beginning with Taken in 2008, created by producer Luc Besson and American screenwriter Robert Mark Kamen. The dialogue of all three films is primarily English, and all three feature Liam Neeson as Bryan Mills. The first film received mixed reviews from critics but a positive response from audiences with commercial success. The series grossed a combined $929,451,015 worldwide.

The series has also experienced diminishing critical reception with each successive film.

A prequel television series based on a similar storyline and starring Clive Standen and Jennifer Beals premiered in February 2017.

== Films ==
Film	U.S. release date	Directors	Screenwriters	Producer(s)
Taken	January 30, 2009	Pierre Morel	Luc Besson & Robert Mark Kamen	Luc Besson
Taken 2	October 5, 2012	Olivier Megaton	Luc Besson & Robert Mark Kamen	Luc Besson
Taken 3	January 9, 2015	Olivier Megaton	Luc Besson & Robert Mark Kamen	Luc Besson

=== Taken (2008) ===
A retired CIA operative named Bryan Mills crosses the globe to rescue his 17-year-old daughter after she is kidnapped by a group of Albanian smugglers while traveling in France.

=== Taken 2 (2012) ===
Mafia boss and terrorist Murad Hoxha, the father of Marko Hoxha, whom Bryan had killed by electrocution in the first film of the trilogy, plans to capture Bryan, who is vacationing with his family in Istanbul, and avenge his son's death.

=== Taken 3 (2015) ===
Bryan has been framed for the murder of his ex-wife, Lenore. He then sets out to clear his name by going after the real killers, while also eluding capture from U.S. authorities for whom he formerly worked.

== Television ==
=== Taken (2017–2018) ===
In September 2015, NBC ordered a Taken television series depicting a young Bryan Mills. In February 2016, Vikings actor Clive Standen was announced to play the young Bryan Mills, with Alex Carey as the showrunner.

== Cast and crew ==
=== Cast ===
Characters	Films			Television series	
Characters	Taken	Taken 2	Taken 3	Taken	
Characters	Taken	Taken 2	Taken 3	Season 1	Season 2
Characters	2008	2012	2014	2017	2018
Bryan Mills	Liam Neeson	Liam Neeson	Liam Neeson	Clive Standen^{M}	Clive Standen^{M}
Kimberly "Kim" Mills	Maggie Grace	Maggie Grace	Maggie Grace		
Lenore "Lenny" Mills-St. John	Famke Janssen	Famke Janssen	Famke Janssen		
Sam "Scott" Gilroy	Leland Orser	Leland Orser	Leland Orser	Michael Irby	
Mark Rem Casey	Jon Gries	Jon Gries	Jon Gries	James Landry Hébert	
Bernie Dave Harris	David Warshofsky	D. B. Sweeney	David Warshofsky	Jose Pablo Cantillo	
Jean-Claude Pitrel	Olivier Rabourdin	Olivier Rabourdin			
Marko Hoxha	Arben Bajraktaraj	Arben Bajraktaraj^{A}^{P}			
Stuart St. John	Xander Berkeley	Mentioned	Dougray Scott		
Sheerah	Holly Valance				
Amanda	Katie Cassidy				
Patrice Saint-Clair	Gérard Watkins				
Murad Hoxha		Rade Šerbedžija			
Jamie Conrad		Luke Grimes			
Inspector Durmaz		Kevork Malikyan			
Inspector Franck Dotzler			Forest Whitaker		
Oleg Malankov			Sam Spruell		
Jimmy			Jonny Weston		
Detective Smith			Dylan Bruno		
Detective Garcia			Don Harvey		
Detective Johnson			Al Sapienza		
Christina Hart				Jennifer Beals^{M}	Jennifer Beals^{M}
Asha Flynn				Brooklyn Sudano^{M}	
John				Gaius Charles^{M}	
Becca Vlasik				Monique Gabriela Curnen^{M}	
Cali Mills				Celeste Desjardins^{R}	Celeste Desjardins^{P}
Harry Ward				Dominic Fumusa^{R}	
Riley				Jennifer Marsala^{R}	
Faaron				Simu Liu^{R}	
Marzoki				Ali Kazmi^{R}	
Elena Morales				Layla Alizada^{R}	
Harden Kilroy					Adam Goldberg^{M}
Santana					Jessica Camacho^{M}
James Casey					Peter Outerbridge^{R}
Krystiyan					Christian Bako^{R}

== Reception ==
=== Box office performance ===
Film	Release date	Box office gross			Box office ranking		Budget	Reference(s)
Film	United States	North America	Other territories	Worldwide	All time North America	All time worldwide	Budget	Reference(s)
Taken (2008)	January 30, 2009	$145,000,989	$81,829,579	$226,830,568	#292	#500	$25,000,000	
Taken 2 (2012)	October 5, 2012	$139,854,287	$236,287,019	$376,141,306	#318	#219	$45,000,000	
Taken 3 (2014)	January 9, 2015	$89,256,424	$237,222,717	$326,479,141	#697	#357	$48,000,000	
Total		$374,111,700	$555,339,315	$929,451,015			$118,000,000	

=== Critical and public response ===
Film	Rotten Tomatoes	Metacritic	CinemaScore
Taken (2008)	60% (178 reviews)	51 (32 reviews)	A−
Taken 2 (2012)	22% (173 reviews)	45 (35 reviews)	B+
Taken 3 (2014)	13% (124 reviews)	26 (30 reviews)	B+

== In popular culture ==
- On January 15, 2015, to promote the American release of Taken 3, Liam Neeson starred in a short film on the show entitled Taken 4: A-Paco-Lypse on American talk show Jimmy Kimmel Live!; the short revolved around Bryan Mills helping his old friend Guillermo rescue his kidnapped dog, Paco from "Kimmel".
- In 2017, Bryan Mills was featured in the fifth season of the web television series The Most Popular Girls in School, in which he is searching France for his daughter Kim, after she was kidnapped by a rival group of French models while representing the United States as a model herself. Liam Neeson reprises his role as Mills.
