= Taken (film) =

2008 film by Pierre Morel

- Theatrical release poster
- Directed by: Pierre Morel
- Written by: Luc Besson; Robert Mark Kamen
- Produced by: Luc Besson
- Starring: Liam Neeson; Maggie Grace; Leland Orser; Jon Gries; David Warshofsky; Katie Cassidy; Holly Valance; Famke Janssen
- Cinematography: Michel Abramowicz
- Edited by: Frédéric Thoraval
- Music by: Nathaniel Méchaly
- Production companies: EuropaCorp; Grive Productions; Canal+; TPS Star; M6 Films
- Distributed by: EuropaCorp Distribution (France)
- Release date: 27 February 2008 (France)
- Running time: 94 minutes
- Country: France
- Language: English
- Budget: $25 million
- Box office: $226.8 million

Taken is a 2008 English-language French action-thriller film directed by Pierre Morel and written by Luc Besson and Robert Mark Kamen. It stars Liam Neeson, Maggie Grace, Leland Orser, Jon Gries, David Warshofsky, Katie Cassidy, Holly Valance and Famke Janssen. In the film, Bryan Mills, an ex-CIA officer, sets out to track down his teenage daughter Kim and her best friend Amanda after they are kidnapped by Albanian sex traffickers while on vacation in France.

Taken was released in France on February 27, 2008. The film received mixed reviews from critics, and was a financial success, grossing $226 million against a $25 million budget. Numerous media outlets cited the film as a turning point in Neeson's career that redefined him as an action star. It also launched a franchise, consisting of two sequels and a television series.

== Plot ==
Former Green Beret and retired CIA officer Bryan Mills attempts to build a closer relationship with his 17-year-old daughter, Kim, who lives with her mother, Lenore, and her wealthy step-father, Stuart. While overseeing security at a concert for pop star Sheerah, Bryan saves her from a knife-wielding attacker. Sheerah gratefully offers to have her vocal coach assess Kim, an aspiring singer. Meanwhile, Kim asks Bryan for permission to visit Paris with her friend, Amanda. Though concerned about Kim's safety, Bryan, pressured by Lenore, reluctantly agrees. At the airport, Bryan learns that Kim and Amanda are actually planning to follow U2 during their European tour.

Upon arriving at Charles de Gaulle Airport, Kim and Amanda meet Peter, who drives them to Amanda's cousins' apartment. There, Amanda tells Peter that her cousins are in Madrid and that they are staying there alone, a fact she hid from Kim. After they part, Peter then makes a phone call, passing along information about the girls. While talking with Bryan on her cell phone, Kim sees men entering the apartment and abducting Amanda. Upon instructions from her father, Kim yells out her captor's descriptions as she is taken. Bryan tells the kidnappers that he will avoid pursuing them if they release Kim, but threatens them with death if they fail to comply. The listener only replies, "good luck", and terminates the call. Bryan's former colleague, Sam, deduces the kidnappers belong to an Albanian sex trafficking ring, and identifies the recorded voice as its boss Marko Hoxha. Based on previous abductions, if Kim is not found within 96 hours, it is not likely Bryan will find her again.

Bryan flies to Paris. At the apartment, he finds Kim's broken phone and using its memory card, checks the photos. He identifies Peter in one of them, revealing him to be a scout for the ring. Bryan locates and apprehends Peter at the airport attempting to lure another victim, but Peter escapes after one of his associates attacks Bryan. In the ensuing pursuit, Peter is fatally run over by an oncoming truck. With his only lead dead, Bryan contacts Jean-Claude Pitrel, an ex-DGSE agent turned National Police officer. Jean-Claude informs him about the local red-light district where the Albanians operate but warns Bryan to avoid getting involved. Bryan plants a listening device on an Albanian pimp, and with help from a hired translator, is led to a makeshift brothel in a construction yard. He rescues a drugged young woman who has Kim's jacket, causing a violent gunfight that kills several sex traffickers. Bryan takes the woman to a hotel and improvises her detoxification.

The next morning, the woman informs Bryan about a safehouse where she and Kim were kept. Posing as Jean-Claude, Bryan infiltrates under the pretence of renegotiating the police protection rate. When Bryan identifies Marko by his voice, the meeting erupts into a fight, which results in several terrorists being killed. Searching the house, Bryan finds Amanda, dead from an overdose. Bryan tortures Marko with electricity into revealing that virgins like Kim are sold on the black market, identifying her buyer as crime syndicate terrorist Patrice Saint-Clair. Bryan then leaves Marko to die from continuous electrocution.

After a vicious confrontation with Jean-Claude over his corruption in order to disclose Saint-Clair's location, Bryan infiltrates a clandestine sex slave auction occurring beneath Saint-Clair's mansion. Witnessing Kim as the last sale, Bryan forces an Arab bidder to purchase her but is subsequently caught and subdued. Saint-Clair orders him killed, but Bryan breaks loose and eliminates all the henchmen; a mortally wounded Saint-Clair reveals Kim was brought to a nearby yacht before Bryan murders him.

Boarding the vessel, Bryan eliminates the bodyguards one by one and breaks into a bedroom, where he kills a sheikh holding Kim at knifepoint. He rescues Kim and upon returning to the US, they reunite with Lenore and Stuart. Bryan surprises Kim by taking her to visit Sheerah.

== Cast ==
- Liam Neeson as Bryan Mills, an ex-Green Beret and CIA officer seeking to rescue his daughter from sex traffickers
- Maggie Grace as Kimberly "Kim" Mills, Bryan's daughter
- Famke Janssen as Lenore "Lenny" Mills-St John, Bryan's former wife
- Leland Orser as Sam Gilroy, a former colleague of Bryan who helps track down Kim's abductors
- Jon Gries as Mark Casey
- David Warshofsky as Bernie Harris
- Holly Valance as Sheerah, a pop star Bryan is hired to protect
- Katie Cassidy as Amanda, Kim's friend
- Xander Berkeley as Stuart St. John, Lenore's husband and Kim's stepdad
- Olivier Rabourdin as Jean-Claude Pitrel, an ex-DGSE agent now National Police officer and old acquaintance to Bryan
- Gérard Watkins as Patrice Saint-Clair, a black market sex trafficking auctioneer and terrorist leader
- Arben Bajraktaraj as Marko Hoxha, terrorist leader of a sex trafficking ring responsible for Kim's abduction
- Camille Japy as Isabelle
- Nicolas Giraud as Peter, a small-time criminal serving as a scout for a terrorist sex trafficking ring
- Goran Kostić as Gregor, an Albanian University professor who Bryan hired to translate for him
- Nabil Massad as Raman, the Sheikh, and a customer to Pitrel
- Jalil Naciri as Ali, one of Sheikh Raman's personal bodyguards

== Production ==
The film was produced by Luc Besson's EuropaCorp. Pierre Morel had previously worked as a director of photography for Besson, and they had also collaborated on Morel's directorial debut, District 13. Besson pitched the idea of Taken one night over dinner and Morel immediately became attached to the idea of a father fighting to protect his daughter. Jeff Bridges was first cast as Bryan Mills, but after he dropped out of the project, Liam Neeson accepted the part, desiring to play a more physically demanding role than he was used to. Neeson at first thought the film to be no more than a "little side road" for his career, expecting it to be released directly to video. Instead, the film went on to define Neeson's career and establish him as an action star.

== Music ==
The score of the film was composed by Nathaniel Méchaly and released on 27 January 2009.

=== Soundtrack ===
All songs written and composed by Nathaniel Méchaly except where noted.

Taken (Original Motion Picture Soundtrack)
No.	Title	Length
1.	"Opening"	0:52
2.	"Change" (Written and performed by Joy Denalane featuring Lupe Fiasco)	4:12
3.	"Permission to Go to Paris"	1:11
4.	"Heading Off"	1:10
5.	"The Concert"	0:53
6.	"There's Somebody Here"	3:22
7.	"Pursuit at Roissy"	1:07
8.	"On the Rooftop"	1:40
9.	"Ninety Six Hours"	6:01
10.	"The Construction Site"	2:04
11.	"Pursuit at the Construction Site"	1:25
12.	"Saving Alex"	1:14
13.	"Escape From St Clair"	1:38
14.	"Tick Tick, Boom" (Written and performed by The Hives)	3:24
15.	"Hotel Camelia"	1:38
16.	"The Auction"	1:38
17.	"Pursuit by the"	3:15
18.	"On the Boat"	1:05
19.	"The Last Fight"	1:52
20.	"The Dragster Wave" (Written and performed by Ghinzu)	6:09
Total length:		45:50

== Release ==
Taken was released in France on February 27, 2008, by EuropaCorp and was released in other territories by 20th Century Fox.

The film was edited by 3 minutes to secure a PG-13 rating in the United States.

== Reception and legacy ==
=== Box office ===
Taken grossed $145 million in North America and $81.8 million in other territories, for a worldwide total of $226.8 million, against a production budget of $25 million.

On its opening day in North America, the film grossed $9.4 million, scoring the best opening day ever for Super Bowl weekend. It went on to make $24.7 million during its opening weekend playing in 3,183 theaters, with a $7,765 per-theatre average and ranking #1, which was the second highest Super Bowl opening weekend, at the time, behind Hannah Montana and Miley Cyrus: Best of Both Worlds Concert ($31.1 million). The film is also the highest grossing among the Taken films in North America.

The biggest markets in other territories were South Korea, UK, France, Australia and Spain: the film grossed $15.47 million, $11.27 million, $9.43 million, $6.28 million, and $5.46 million respectively.

=== Critical response ===
On Rotten Tomatoes, the film has a rating of 60%, based on 178 reviews, with an average rating of 5.80/10. The site's critical consensus reads, "Taken is undeniably fun with slick action, but is largely a brainless exercise." On Metacritic, the film has a score of 50 out of 100, based on 32 critics, indicating "mixed or average reviews". Audiences polled by CinemaScore gave the film an average grade of "A−" on an A+ to F scale.

Roger Ebert of the Chicago Sun-Times gave the film two and a half stars out of four, writing, "It's always a puzzle to review a movie like this. On the one hand, it's preposterous. But who expects a 'Bourne'-type city-wrecking operative to be plausible? On the other hand, it's very well made. Liam Neeson brings the character a hard-edged, mercilessly focused anger, and director Pierre Morel hurtles through action sequences at a breathless velocity." Richard Corliss of Time said the film "has nothing more on its mind than dozens of bad guys getting beat up and another one turned into instant roadkill." The Washington Post described the film as "a satisfying little thriller as grimly professional as its efficient hero" and likened the action to the Bourne film series. Derek Elley of Variety described the film as a "kick ass, pedal-to-the-metal actioner [...] that wisely doesn't give the viewer any time to ponder the string of unlikely coincidences [...] the film has the forward, devil-may-care momentum of a Bond film on steroids."

Kenneth Turan of the Los Angeles Times described the film's premise as "unintentionally silly at times [...] Obviously, 'Taken' is not the kind of action film to spend much time worrying about its pedestrian script or largely indifferent acting, so it's fortunate to have Neeson in the starring role." Bryan Mills is characterized as a "relentless attack machine who is impervious to fists, bullets and fast-moving cars, [who] uses a variety of martial arts skills to knock out more opponents than Mike Tyson and casually kill those he doesn't KO".

=== Later events ===
In 2011, a self-proclaimed counter-terrorism expert was convicted of wire fraud after claiming the film was based on a real-life incident in which his daughter was killed. William G. Hillar, who pretended to be a retired Green Beret colonel, claimed to have spent more than 12 years lecturing US government agencies such as the Federal Bureau of Investigation on security issues. However, records revealed he had actually been a radar operator in the Coast Guard Reserve between 1962 and 1970, and had never been in the U.S. Army. Nevertheless, his website claimed Taken was based on events involving him and his family. Hillar, who admitted the charges, was sentenced to 500 hours of community service at Maryland State Veteran Cemeteries. He also agreed to repay $171,000 in speaking fees that he had received from various organizations to which he had presented himself as an expert in terrorism and human trafficking.

In 2019, in an attempt to promote tourism and counter the negative perception of Albanians in the Western media, the Albanian government, together with foreign donors, produced a tourism advertisement entitled "Be Taken by Albania", where Liam Neeson is asked to visit Albania and explore the country's cultural, culinary and tourism hotspots.

=== Legacy ===
After the film was released, the "Taken Speech" that Neeson's character gave while talking on the phone with his daughter's kidnappers became a joke, including being used as a series of internet memes. One such notable parody was in the Family Guy season ten episode "Leggo My Meg-O", in a scene where Peter Griffin informs his daughter Meg while being kidnapped in Paris to "panic," and then informs one of the kidnappers (revealing his name as "Drakkar Noir") that he has no intelligent skills. Neeson described the scene as "corny. It was a cornball. I really did feel that."

== Awards ==
Award	Category	Subject	Result
Broadcast Music, Inc.	BMI Film Music Award	Nathaniel Méchaly	Won
Golden Schmoes Awards	Best Line	Liam Neeson	Won
Golden Schmoes Awards	Biggest Surprise of the Year	Taken	2nd place
Saturn Award	Best International Film	Taken	Nominated

== Home media ==
Taken was released as "Taken (Single-Disc Extended Edition)" on DVDs on 12 May 2009 and on Blu-ray on 9 December 2014. The film also saw release of "Taken (Two-Disc Extended Edition)" on DVDs and Blu-ray Discs on 12 May 2009. As of 5 February 2015, the film has sold 5,388,963 DVDs and 607,073 Blu-ray Discs and grossing $79,798,171 and $10,069,116 respectively totaling $89,867,287 in North America.

== Sequels ==
In November 2010, Fox announced that EuropaCorp would produce a sequel directed by Olivier Megaton. Taken 2 was subsequently released in France on 3 October 2012, with Neeson, Janssen, Grace, Gries, Rabourdin and Orser reprising their roles from the first film. A third Taken film was released 16 December 2014.

== Television series ==
In September 2015, NBC greenlit a TV series depicting a younger Bryan Mills with Clive Standen portraying Mills, Gaius Charles, Monique Gabriela Curnen, James Landry Hébert, Michael Irby, Jose Pablo Cantillo, Jennifer Marsala and Simu Liu are cast as John, Vlasik, Casey, Scott, Dave, Riley and Faaron, members of OPCON. Brooklyn Sudano is cast as Asha, an attractive, well-educated young student from an upper-middle-class family who is furthering her education when she first meets Bryan, and Jennifer Beals is cast as Christina Hart, the Special Deputy Director of National Intelligence who has taken Mills under her wing. Alexander Cary is a writer, executive producer and showrunner for the series and Alex Graves directed the pilot. The show lasted two seasons, beginning in February 2017 and ending in June the following year.

== See also ==
- Agent Kim Reactivated, has a similar premise about tracking down a kidnapped daughter – 2026 South Korean television series
