= EuropaCorp =

French film production company

EuropaCorp S.A.
- Formerly: Leeloo Productions (1992-1999)
- Type: Public
- Traded as: Euronext Paris: ALECP; Euronext Growth
- Industry: Motion picture
- Founded: 1992; 34 years ago
- Founders: Luc Besson; Pierre-Ange Le Pogam
- Headquarters: Saint-Denis, Île-de-France, France
- Number of locations: 2 (2016)
- Key people: Luc Besson (chairman); Jean-Marc Lacarrère (CEO)
- Revenue: ▲€35.3 million (2021)
- Net income: €16.7 million (2021)
- Owners: Vine Alternative Investments (59.65%); Frontline (12.67%)
- Divisions: Roissy Films; EuropaCorp Television; EuropaCorp Animation; EuropaCorp Japan; EuropaCorp Films USA; RED (Relativity EuropaCorp Distribution) (joint venture with Relativity Media)
- Website: www.europacorp.com

EuropaCorp S.A. (stylised in opening logo as EUROPA CORP. until 2022) is a French motion picture company headquartered in Saint-Denis, a northern suburb of Paris, and one of a few full-service independent studios that both produce and distribute feature films. It specializes in production, distribution, home entertainment, VOD, sales, partnerships and licenses, recording, publishing and exhibition. EuropaCorp's integrated financial model generates revenues from a wide range of sources, with films from many genres and a strong presence in the international markets. The company's name and logo are an homage to the Greek myth of Europa, a sea nymph spirit.

Over 14 years, EuropaCorp has produced and co-produced over 80 films and is now distributing over 500 titles after the integration of the RoissyFilms Catalogue. The studio is mainly known for its expertise in the production of English-language films. It developed and produced the successful Taken trilogy and the Transporter series. It began producing TV series in 2010 through EuropaCorp Television which had already adapted EuropaCorp's popular Taxi film franchise.

== History ==
The company was created by Luc Besson in 1992 under the name Leeloo Productions, but it only fully began producing and co-producing feature films many years later, with the release of Taxi and The Dancer. The company was renamed EuropaCorp in 2000. Besson had also created a smaller production company called Les Films du Dauphin in 1990 that has existed outside of Leeloo Productions / EuropaCorp. Pierre-Ange Le Pogam, an old associate of Besson from Gaumont, the production company behind many earlier Besson's directed films, joined EuropaCorp in 2000. He had worked with Besson since 1985, first as a Distribution Director and from 1997 as a Deputy Chief Executive Officer at Gaumont. He became known as the right-hand man of Besson at EuropaCorp. He left the company in 2011 over disagreements with Besson.

In July 2007, EuropaCorp successfully managed its IPO on Euronext Paris. In May 2008, the CSA, French authority for media regulation, selected the EuropaCorp TV project in its invitation to apply for a mobile TV channel in France. In 2013, Lisa Ellzey, hitherto producer for Lionsgate and 20th Century Fox, was appointed as executive vice president of U.S. Motion Picture Production of EuropaCorp.

In 2018, Besson was accused of rape by an actress who wishes to remain anonymous. EuropaCorp stocks dropped 17% to just €2.31 ($2.70) after the rape allegation. Later in the same year, EuropaCorp sold its French television division to Mediawan and renamed into Storia Television. EuropaCorp also agreed to sell the Roissy Films library to Gaumont. The rape accusation resulted in a final dismissal by the Court of Cassation in 2023.

In May 2019, EuropaCorp was granted a six-month debt waiver from a French commercial court and placed under court protection. A week later the studio filed for bankruptcy protection in the United States. Its stock value had fallen to €0.67. It had no films in production by that time. In December 2019, the company was $182 million in debt and it had been in long bailout negotiations with the American investment fund Vine Alternative Investments.

In February 2020, Vine Alternative Investments acquired 60.15% of EuropaCorp with another American investment fund, Falcon Strategic Partners IV, acquired 6.25%.

In 2025 (and 2026 for the United States), EuropaCorp released Besson's Dracula, which became the company's biggest box office success since 2017. With over $40 million, it is the highest-grossing French film of 2025.

== Structure ==
In 2007, EuropaCorp was owned at 62% by Besson through his company Frontline and at 8.06% by Le Pogam; 23% was public.

Besson was appointed as the chairman of EuropaCorp's board of directors. Jean-Julien Baronnet was the CEO of EuropaCorp until November 2008. Christophe Lambert was CEO from 2010 to 2016 and then Marc Shmuger replaced him in 2016. In February 2024, the company named Jean-Marc Lacarrère as the new CEO which took office in March of 2024.

Digital Factory is related to EuropaCorp via Besson. The handling of post-production sound is performed chiefly at its Normandy site, while the visual effects are done in Paris. In September 2022, EuropaCorp sold Digital Factory to Groupe Atlantis.

In September 2016, it was announced that Chinese film company Fundamental Films had acquired a stake of 27.9% in EuropaCorp, becoming the second-largest shareholder in the company.

In June 2017, EuropaCorp signed a music publishing deal with Sony Music Publishing. Later that month, the studio posted a loss of 120 million euros (US$135 million).

== International dimension ==
EuropaCorp has produced the world box-office hits like Taken ($224 million at world box-office), Transporter 3 ($113 million), Arthur and the Minimoys ($107 million) and Hitman ($100 million). Two EuropaCorp productions have been topping the US box-office: Transporter 2 by summer 2005 and Taken at spring 2009.

Many international film stars have appeared in EuropaCorp productions: Jim Carrey, Penélope Cruz, Robert De Niro, David Duchovny, Morgan Freeman, Salma Hayek, Tommy Lee Jones, Jet Li, John Malkovich, Jason Statham, Brittany Murphy, Liam Neeson, Madonna, Freddie Highmore, Ewan McGregor, Lou Reed, Mia Farrow, Kevin Costner, Bob Hoskins, Hailee Steinfeld, Paul Walker, Clive Owen, Ethan Hawke, Rihanna, Helen Mirren, Selena Gomez, Scarlett Johansson, Jimmy Fallon, Marion Cotillard, Cillian Murphy, and others. Consequently, the films are usually shot in English.

EuropaCorp founded EuropaCorp Japan, a subsidiary of EuropaCorp based in Tokyo, with its core business distribution of feature films in Japan. It is a joint-venture with three Japanese companies: Asmik Ace, Sumitomo Corporation and Kadokawa Shoten.

Fox Pathé Europa (a joint venture between 20th Century Home Entertainment, Pathé and EuropaCorp) formerly distributed EuropaCorp's titles on home media in France until 2020, when ESC Distribution took over.

In 2012, EuropaCorp struck a three-year output deal with Chinese film distributor Fundamental Films for 15 feature films. Fundamental Films agreed to co-produce three of these films.

In 2014, the company signed a North American distribution deal with Relativity Media, where EuropaCorp arranged to have its movies distributed in North America by Relativity under the brand Relativity EuropaCorp Distribution. When Relativity hit financial trouble, the company signed a North American distribution deal with STX Entertainment for STX to distribute EuropaCorp's movies in North America in 2017.

In May 2015, the company announced an output deal with Polish film distributor Kino Świat.

== "Cité du Cinéma", French movie studios ==
EuropaCorp relocated to the Cité du Cinéma in 2012. This movie studio complex, located in Saint-Denis in the close outskirts of Paris, at build out will have a total of nine film stages, with another 12,000 square metres of space devoted to technical units and 2200 square metres for screening and reception rooms.

The cinema, photography and sound engineering school ENS Louis-Lumière was relocated to the complex in 2012.

EuropaCorp signed a lease with the Nef Lumière, owner of the tertiary complex, for space for its permanent staff and the film crews, with extra space for potential new activities. This tertiary complex is financed by both the Caisse des Dépôt and Vinci.

EuropaCorp is a minority shareholder in the company operating the studios, joining Euro Media Group, Quinta Communications and Frontline. The Euro Media Group, which owns several film studios throughout Europe, will provide management of daily operations of these studios.

== Film ==
Year	Film	Director	Language	Reception	
Year	Film	Director	Language	Rotten Tomatoes	Metacritic
1997	Nil by Mouth	Gary Oldman	English	65%	
2000	Taxi 2	Gérard Krawczyk	French		
2000	The Dancer	Frédéric Garson	English		
2000	Exit	Olivier Megaton	French		
2000	Bang Rajan	Tanit Jitnukul	Thai		
2001	Yamakasi	Ariel Zeitoun; Julien Seri	French		
2001	15 août	Patrick Alessandrin	French		
2001	Kiss of the Dragon	Chris Nahon	English		
2001	Wasabi	Gérard Krawczyk	French	43%	53
2002	Blanche	Bernie Bonvoisin	French		
2002	Once Upon an Angel	Vincent Perez	French		
2002	The Transporter	Louis Leterrier; Corey Yuen	English	53%	
2002	Chaos and Desire	Manon Briand	French		
2003	Laughter and Punishment	Isabelle Doval	French		
2003	Taxi 3	Gérard Krawczyk	French		
2003	I, Cesar	Richard Berry	French		
2003	Tristan	Philippe Harel	French		
2003	Fanfan la Tulipe	Gérard Krawczyk	French		
2003	Les Côtelettes	Bertrand Blier	French		
2003	High Tension	Alexandre Aja	French	41%	42
2003	Happiness Costs Nothing	Mimmo Calopresti	Italian		
2003	Michel Vaillant	Louis-Pascal Couvelaire	French		
2003	Together	Chen Kaige	Chinese (Mandarin)		
2003	Ong-Bak	Prachya Pinkaew	Thai	86%	
2004	Crimson Rivers II: Angels of the Apocalypse	Olivier Dahan	French		
2004	The Story of My Life	Laurent Tirard	French		
2004	À ton image	Aruna Villiers	French		
2004	Taxi	Tim Story	English	10%	
2004	District 13	Pierre Morel	French	80%	
2005	Unleashed	Louis Leterrier	English	65%	58
2005	Ze Film	Guy Jacques	French		
2005	The Prompter	Guillaume Pixie	French		
2005	Pale Eyes	Jérome Bonnell	French		
2005	Imposture	Patrick Bouchitey	French		
2005	Next!	Jeanne Biras	French		
2005	Transporter 2	Louis Leterrier	English		
2005	Revolver	Guy Ritchie	English		
2005	The Black Box	Richard Berry	French		
2005	The Three Burials of Melquiades Estrada	Tommy Lee Jones	English, Spanish	87%	
2005	Angel-A	Luc Besson	French	44%	
2006	Colour Me Kubrick	Brian W. Cook	English	50%	57
2006	Bandidas	Joachim Rønning; Espen Sandberg	English, Spanish	62%	
2006	The Chinese Botanist's Daughters	Dai Sijie	Chinese (Mandarin)		
2006	Love and Other Disasters	Alek Keshishian	English		
2006	Dikkenek	Olivier Van Hoofstadt	French		
2006	Cheeky	David Thewlis	English		
2006	When I Was a Singer	Xavier Giannoli	French		
2006	Tell No One	Guillaume Canet	French	94%	82
2006	Arthur and the Minimoys	Luc Besson	English	22%	39
2006	Adam's Apples	Anders Thomas Jensen	Danish	69%	51
2007	Taxi 4	Gérard Krawczyk	French		
2007	Michou d'Auber	Thomas Gilou	French		
2007	The Dinner Guest	Laurent Bouhnik	French		
2007	The Secret	Vincent Perez	English		
2007	Masked Mobsters	Ariel Zeitoun	French		
2007	Frontier(s)	Xavier Gens	French	55%	44
2007	Hitman	Xavier Gens	English	14%	35
2008	My Very Best Friend	Isabelle Doval	French		
2008	Taken	Pierre Morel	English	58%	50
2008	Behind the Walls	Christian Faure	French		
2008	Sagan	Diane Kurys	French		
2008	Go Fast	Olivier Van Hoofstadt	French		
2008	Being W.	Karl Zéro; Michel Royer	French		
2008	Four Minutes	Chris Kraus	German		
2008	GAL	Miguel Courtois	Spanish		
2008	Transporter 3	Olivier Megaton	English	37%	51
2008	Be Kind Rewind	Michel Gondry	English	66%	52
2008	Sarkar Raj	Ram Gopal Varma	Hindi	75	53
2009	Special Correspondents	Frédéric Auburtin	French		
2009	District 13: Ultimatum	Patrick Alessandrin	French	74%	64
2009	Villa Amalia	Benoît Jacquot	French		
2009	Hallelujah!	Roger Delattre	French		
2009	Home	Yann Arthus-Bertrand	French		
2009	Staten Island	James DeMonaco	English		
2009	Human Zoo	Rie Rasmussen	English		
2009	Fashion Victim	Gérard Jugnot	French		
2009	Le Concert	Radu Mihăileanu	Russian, French		
2009	In the Beginning	Xavier Giannoli	French		
2009	Arthur and the Revenge of Maltazard	Luc Besson	English	14%	
2010	The Whistler	Phillppe Lefebvre	French		
2010	Paris Express	Hervé Renoh	French		
2010	22 Bullets	Richard Berry	French		
2010	I Love You Phillip Morris	Glenn Ficarra; John Requa	English	72%	
2010	From Paris with Love	Pierre Morel	English	37%	
2010	The Extraordinary Adventures of Adèle Blanc-Sec	Luc Besson	French	83%	
2010	Little White Lies	Guillaume Canet	French	41%	
2010	The Big Picture	Éric Lartigau	French	88%	
2010	Arthur 3: The War of the Two Worlds	Luc Besson	English	20%	
2010	Storm	Hans-Christian Schmid	English		
2010	A View of Love	Nicole Garcia	French		
2011	Halal police d'État	Rachid Dhibou	French		
2011	Au bistro du coin	Charles Nemes	French		
2011	The Source	Radu Mihăileanu	Arabic		
2011	Un baiser papillon	Karine Silla	French		
2011	Colombiana	Olivier Megaton	English, Spanish	27%	
2011	A Monster in Paris	Bibo Bergeron	French, English	85%	
2011	La Planque	Akim Isker	French		
2011	The Lady	Luc Besson	English	34%	
2011	Love Lasts Three Years	Frédéric Beigbeder	French		
2012	Lockout	James Mather; Stephen St. Leger	English	38%	48
2012	Blind Man	Xavier Palud	French		
2012	Taken 2	Olivier Megaton	English	21%	45
2012	The Man Who Laughs	Jean-Pierre Améris	French		
2013	The Family	Luc Besson	English	29%	42
2013	The Marchers	Nabil Ben Yadir	French		
2013	For a Woman	Diane Kurys	French	89%	59
2013	The Dream Kids	Vianney Lebasque	French		
2013	Möbius	Éric Rochant	French, English, Russian		
2013	Collision	David Marconi	English		
2013	It Boy	David Moreau	French		
2013	Jack and the Cuckoo-Clock Heart	Stéphane Berla; Mathias Malzieu	French	77%	56
2013	Les Invincibles	Frédéric Berthe	French		
2013	36 heures à tuer	Tristan Aurouet			
2014	3 Days to Kill	McG	English	28%	40
2014	Brick Mansions	Camille Delamarre	English	26%	40
2014	Lucy	Luc Besson	English	67%	61
2014	The Homesman	Tommy Lee Jones	English	82%	68
2014	Never on the First Night	Melissa Drigeard	French		
2014	Fastlife	Thomas N'Gijol	French		
2014	Cartoonists - Foot Soldiers of Democracy	Stéphanie Valloatto	French		
2014	Le Jeu de la vérité	François Desagnat	French		
2014	Angélique	Ariel Zeitoun	French		
2014	Saint Laurent	Bertrand Bonello	French	52%	52
2015	Taken 3	Olivier Megaton	English	11%	26
2015	Bis	Dominique Farrugia	French		
2015	The Transporter Refueled	Camille Delamarre	English	16%	32
2015	Big Game	Jalmari Helander	English	76%	53
2016	Shut In	Farren Blackburn	English	3%	22
2016	Nine Lives	Barry Sonnenfeld	English	11%	11
2016	Miss Sloane	John Madden	English	76%	64
2016	The Warriors Gate	Matthias Hoene	English	50%	
2017	Their Finest	Lone Scherfig	English		
2017	The Circle	James Ponsoldt	English	16%	
2017	Valerian and the City of a Thousand Planets	Luc Besson	English	49%	
2017	Renegades	Steven Quale	English		
2017	Ethel & Ernest	Roger Mainwood	English	94%	
2018	Taxi 5	Franck Gastambide	French		
2018	Kursk	Thomas Vinterberg	English		
2019	Anna	Luc Besson	English		
2022	Arthur, malédiction	Barthélemy Grossmann	French		
2023	Dogman	Luc Besson	English	59%	66%
2024	Weekend in Taipei	George Huang	English		
2025	Dracula	Luc Besson	English	54%	80%
TBA	Father Joe	Barthélemy Grossmann	English		

== Television ==
Storia Television (formerly named EuropaCorp Television) is a French television production company that specialises in creating television series and films for French and international markets. It was EuropaCorp's former television division.

On April 16 2010, EuropaCorp acquired television production company Cipango.

In January 2018, Mediawan announced that it had acquired EuropaCorp Television from EuropaCorp and had renamed it into Storia Television, expanding Mediawan's drama portfolio and becoming the biggest production studio of television fiction contents and expanded their international contents. However, the American arm of EuropaCorp Television was excluded.

=== Television series ===
Title	Years	Network	Notes
Taxi Brooklyn	2014	TF1; NBC (United States)	Co-production with Gary Scott Thompson Productions; Based on the movie Taxi by Luc Besson
Arthur and the Minimoys	2017–2018	Canal J, Gulli & Tiji; OUFtivi (Belgium); Disney Channel (Germany); Radio-Canada (Canada)	Co-production with Studio 100 Animation; Based on the movie of the same name by Luc Besson
The Crimson Rivers	2018	France 2	co-production with Maze Pictures
Infidèle	2019–2020	TF1; La Une (Belgium)	Also known as Unfaithful co-production with BBC Studios France and Be-Films

- XIII: The Series (2011–2012)
- No Limit (2012–2015)
- Transporter: The Series (2012–2014)
- Flight of the Storks (2012)
- Nom de code: Rose (2012)
- Taken: The Series (2017–2018)

== Awards and nominations ==
- 2009: In the Beginning directed by Xavier Giannoli competed as France's Official Selection in the Cannes Film Festival.
- 2009: I Love You Phillip Morris, in which Glenn Ficarra and John Requa directed the film stars Jim Carrey and Ewan McGregor, competed for the Camera d’Or during the Director’s Fortnight.
- 2009: Taken, directed by Pierre Morel, was nominated at the Teen Choice Award for the Action Adventure Movie Award. The movie and its soundtrack composer Nathaniel Mechaly in particular, won the BMI Film Music Award.
- 2009: Human Zoo, directed by Rie Rasmussen, competed at the 59th Berlin Film Festival in the Panorama section, as well as at the film festivals in Copenhagen and Rio de Janeiro.
- 2007: Hitman, directed by Xavier Gens, won the Golden Trailer Award 2008 for Best Motion/Title Graphics.
- 2007: Arthur and the Invisibles, directed by Luc Besson, won the NRJ Ciné Award 2007 for Best Dubbing; the film was also nominated at the Young Artist Award for Best International Family Feature Film and Best Performance in an International Feature Film - Leading Young Actor with Freddie Highmore.
- 2006: The Chinese Botanist's Daughters, directed by Dai Sijie, won in 2006 the Best Artistic Contribution and People’s Choice Awards at the Montreal World Film Festival, and was nominated for the «Grand Prix des Amériques». The film won the Best Canadian Film or Video Award at the 2007 Toronto Inside Out Lesbian and Gay Film and Video Festival.
- 2005: The Three Burials of Melquiades Estrada, by Tommy Lee Jones, was nominated for the Palme d'Or, and Tommy Lee Jones won the Best Actor Award while Guillermo Arriaga won the Best Script Award. The movie was given a place of honor at the Satellite Awards 2005 and the Independent Spirit Awards 2005. It also won the "Grand Prix" at the Flanders International Film Festival and the Bronze Wrangler at the Western Heritage Awards.
