= Taken 2 =

2012 film by Olivier Megaton

- U.S. theatrical release poster
- Directed by: Olivier Megaton
- Written by: Luc Besson; Robert Mark Kamen
- Produced by: Luc Besson
- Starring: Liam Neeson; Maggie Grace; Famke Janssen; Rade Šerbedžija; Leland Orser; Jon Gries; D.B. Sweeney; Luke Grimes
- Cinematography: Romain Lacourbas
- Edited by: Camille Delamarre; Vincent Tabaillon
- Music by: Nathaniel Méchaly
- Production companies: EuropaCorp; M6 Films; Grive Productions; Canal+; M6; Ciné+
- Distributed by: EuropaCorp Distribution (France)
- Release dates: 7 September 2012 (Deauville Film Festival); 3 October 2012 (France)
- Running time: 91 minutes
- Country: France
- Language: English
- Budget: $45 million
- Box office: $376.1 million

Taken 2 is a 2012 English-language French action-thriller film directed by Olivier Megaton and starring Liam Neeson, Maggie Grace, Famke Janssen, Rade Šerbedžija, Leland Orser, Jon Gries, D.B. Sweeney, and Luke Grimes. It follows retired CIA officer Bryan Mills as he ends up with his family in Istanbul, where he is kidnapped, along with his ex-wife, by the father of one of the men he killed while saving his daughter two years earlier.

It is the sequel to the 2008 film Taken and the second installment in the Taken trilogy. Released on 3 October 2012 in France by EuropaCorp and 5 October 2012 in the United States by 20th Century Fox, the film grossed over $376 million at the box office, making it the highest grossing installment of the trilogy, but received negative reviews from critics. A third film, Taken 3, was released on 9 January 2015.

== Plot ==
At the funeral of his son Marko and associates in Tropojë, Albanian mafia head and freelance terrorist Murad Hoxha vows to seek vengeance on his son's killer. Traveling to Paris with his men, he interrogates and tortures ex-French DGSE agent turned corrupt National Police officer Jean-Claude Pitrel, whose business card was found at the scene of Marko's death, but finds no information. He then bribes a corrupt police official for Pitrel's files and deduces that Pitrel's old friend, Bryan Mills, is responsible and is vacationing in Istanbul.

Meanwhile, Bryan has just finished his three-day security job for a wealthy Saudi Arabian sheik in Istanbul and is surprised by his ex-wife, Lenore, and daughter, Kim, turning up to visit him. While going out for lunch with Lenore the next day, Bryan spots Murad's men following them. He tells Lenore to run and tries to outrun the Albanians but finally surrenders when they capture Lenore. Realizing that Kim is also a target, Bryan calls her at the hotel and tells her to hide in the closet to escape the kidnappers. She narrowly avoids capture when the kidnappers are forced to flee after they shoot two security guards.

Regaining consciousness, Bryan finds himself zip tied to a pipe over his head in an empty basement. He uses a miniature cellphone hidden in his sock to contact Kim and instructs her to alert the American embassy; instead, she convinces him to let her help. Opening her father's equipment case, Kim takes a grenade and detonates it on a nearby rooftop; the resulting sound allows Bryan to instruct her on triangulating his location.

The terrorists bring in Lenore, make a small incision in her neck, and hang her upside down to bleed out. As soon as they leave, Bryan frees himself and then Lenore. He next has Kim detonate two more grenades to find his location and tells her to look for some steam through a chimney to guide her to his location. Kim tosses a gun down the chimney, which Bryan uses to kill the guards holding him captive. He rescues Kim but watches Lenore get recaptured. Stealing a taxi, Bryan and Kim pursue the kidnappers' van, and an SUV driven by one of the kidnappers' henchmen arrives to distract them. A chase and shootout ensue, alerting Turkish police, and ends when Bryan manages to lure the SUV into the path of an oncoming train, taking it out.

Leaving Kim at the American embassy, Bryan uses his memory to find Murad's hideout. He rescues Lenore and pursues the surviving terrorists to a bathhouse, where he kills them. Confronting Murad, Bryan offers to let him walk if he agrees to return home and cease his desire for revenge. When Murad agrees, Bryan drops his gun and begins to leave, but Murad immediately reneges and tries to kill Bryan. To Murad's horror, however, the weapon is unloaded, as Bryan had removed the bullet, and Bryan, knowing that Murad just revealed that he will never let go of his vendetta against him, ultimately kills Murad by impaling him on a sharp towel hook.

Three weeks later, at a diner in Los Angeles, the Mills family has milkshakes to celebrate Kim passing her driving test. To Bryan's surprise, they are joined by Kim's boyfriend, Jamie, and she jokingly tells her father not to "shoot this one."

== Cast ==
- Liam Neeson as Bryan Mills
- Maggie Grace as Kimberly "Kim" Mills, Bryan and Lennie's daughter
- Famke Janssen as Lenore "Lennie" Mills-St. John, Bryan's former wife
- Rade Šerbedžija as Murad Hoxha, Marko's dad who wants to kill Bryan for his son's death
- Leland Orser as Sam Gilroy, Bryan's old friend
- Jon Gries as Mark Casey, Bryan's old friend
- D. B. Sweeney as Bernie Harris, Bryan's old friend
- Luke Grimes as Jamie Conrad, Kim's boyfriend
- Olivier Rabourdin as Jean-Claude Pitrel
- Kevork Malikyan as Inspector Durmaz
- Luenell as Kim's Driving Instructor

== Production ==
Filming took place throughout early 2012; Neeson and Grace shot their scenes in January in Los Angeles. The Istanbul scenes were shot in November 2011. Some scenes were filmed during a week at the new film studios of the Cité du Cinéma founded by Luc Besson in Saint-Denis in France.

=== Music ===
Nathaniel Méchaly composed the score for Taken 2, which was released on 1 October 2012.

=== Track listing ===
All songs written and composed by Nathaniel Méchaly except where noted.

Taken 2: (Original Motion Picture Soundtrack)
No.	Title	Length
1.	"Taken 2"	1:36
2.	"The Burial"	0:44
3.	"Too Close" (Written and performed by Alex Clare)	4:13
4.	"Kim and Jamie's Car"	1:29
5.	"Let Me" (Written and performed by Phoebe Killdeer & The Short Straws)	2:54
6.	"Back to Paris"	0:44
7.	"Bryan Waiting for Lenore"	0:28
8.	"Torture"	0:32
9.	"Bagasaz" (Written and performed by Kasbah Rockers featuring Özgür Sakar)	3:18
10.	"Kim and Bryan on the Bosphorus"	1:48
11.	"Murad Arrives"	0:26
12.	"Pursuit in the Souk"	2:52
13.	"Bryan and Lenore Are Taken"	1:36
14.	"A Real Hero" (Written and performed by College and Electric Youth)	4:26
15.	"In the Van"	2:02
16.	"Murad Faces Bryan"	2:31
17.	"Bryan Escapes"	1:19
18.	"Tick of the Clock" (Written and performed by Chromatics)	4:41
19.	"Kim Hides at the Hotel"	2:58
20.	"Bosumus" (Written and performed by Sabahat Akkiraz)	3:19
21.	"Searching for Lenore"	2:09
22.	"Fight in the Hammam"	1:33
23.	"Death of Murad"	2:46
24.	"Handyman"	2:11
Total length:		53:15

== Release ==
Taken 2 was screened on 7 September 2012 at the 38th Deauville American Film Festival. It was theatrically released in more than 25 international markets, including North America, on 5 October 2012. The film was released under the title of "Takip: İstanbul" in Turkey, "Busca Implacável 2" in Brazil, "Venganza: Conexión Estambul" in Spain, "Taken - La vendetta" in Italy and "Заложница 2" in Russia.

=== Box office ===
Taken 2 grossed $139.9 million in North America and $236.3 million in other territories, which brings the film's worldwide total to $376.1 million against a budget of $45 million.

For its opening day in North America, the film topped the box office and earned $18.4 million, $1.5 million of which came from midnight showings. In its opening weekend, Taken 2 grossed $49.5 million in North America, playing in 3,661 theaters, with a $13,525 per-theatre average and debuting in the No. 1 spot, setting a new record for the highest-ever October opening in North America of a film rated PG-13, and earned about $55 million in other markets. During its second weekend at the North American box office, the film dropped 55.8% from its first weekend and grossed $21.9 million while holding onto the No. 1 spot. The film grossed a total of $3,385,094 in the Philippines by its fifth week. The biggest foreign markets being UK, France, Australia and South Korea where the film grossed $37.8 million, $24.4 million, $20.2 million and $15.5 million.

== Reception ==
On Rotten Tomatoes, the film holds an approval rating of 22% based on 174 reviews and an average rating of 4.21/10. The site's consensus reads: "Taken 2 is largely bereft of the kinetic thrills—and surprises—that made the original a hit." On Metacritic, the film has a score of 45 out of 100, based on 35 critics, indicating "mixed or average reviews". Audiences polled by the market research firm CinemaScore gave the film a B+ grade on average, lower than the "A−" earned by its predecessor.

Roger Ebert, of the Chicago Sun-Times, gave the film 3 stars out of 4, writing:

Taken 2 is slick, professional action... The cast is uniformly capable and dead serious, and if you're buying what [co-writer and producer] Luc Besson is selling, he's not short-changing you.

Kenneth Turan of the Los Angeles Times wrote, "At a beefy 6-foot-4, Liam Neeson certainly looks physically imposing, but it was the notion of casting someone who can actually act in an action hero role that was the counter-intuitive concept that made both films—Taken 2 is more a remake than a sequel—so successful." Bernard Besserglik of The Hollywood Reporter reviewed the film after its screening at Deauville, concluding, "There's a touch of vigilante advocacy in the movie that will displease some, with Liam Neeson as a more gentlemanly version of the Charles Bronson of the Death Wish series, but clearly there's still a market for such fantasies. Moviegoers who liked Taken and want more of the same will get precisely that."

John Anderson of The Wall Street Journal wrote that there is a "blind adherence to formula evident in most of Taken 2. As they might say in the advertising department, it's an adrenaline-fuelled thrill ride. But it could have been much more." Lisa Schwarzbaum of Entertainment Weekly gave the film a C grade, writing, "You know what happens in Taken 2, don't you? The same thing that happened four years ago in Taken, but different. (But the same.)" and that Taken 2 "is simultaneously silly, nasty, a lazy festival of stereotypes, and a cleverly made piece of merchandise—i.e., it's the devil we know." Neil Genzlinger of The New York Times wrote that much of Taken 2 "seems like a nonstop car and foot chase, with Albanian after Albanian falling victim to Bryan's remarkable aim and hand-fighting skills. Foreigners bad, Americans good, box office busy."

Keith Phipps of The A.V. Club gave the film a C grade, writing, "What begins as a family outing, with a hint of rekindled romance between the parents, devolves into kidnapping (the word 'taken' gets thrown about liberally), torture, high-speed chases, and other misadventures probably not smiled upon by the Turkish Board of Tourism. None of it is particularly novel or exciting." Scott Bowles of USA Today gave the film 2 1/2 stars out of 4, writing, "The first half of Taken 2 is a serviceable action flick, but the second half descends into cliches" and "[a]t times, Taken 2 even steps from the shadows of the original with some terrifying imagery and an improved relationship between father and daughter. Alas, the movie can't help but descend into a pat part two, bereft of much suspense or tension." Peter Bradshaw of The Guardian gave the film 2 stars out of 5, concluding, "In the first movie, from the tailend of the Bush era, Liam was not shy about using Jack Bauerish torture techniques, wiring up evil-doers to the mains and zapping them with righteous volts. None of that now. That was a 15; this is a 12A, a bit tamer, just as ridiculous, but the premise is looking pretty tired."

Joe Neumaier of the Daily News also gave the film 2 stars out of 5, writing, "Taken 2 has a plot that could have been written by a GPS program, and contains all the technical charm that conjures up. Yet somehow, Liam Neeson growls through this just-acceptable action sequel with his dignity intact, his wallet bigger and his movie family oblivious to all that occurred in 2009's Taken." Neil Smith of Total Film gave the film 2 stars out of 5, concluding, "Yet while it's fun to watch him take out the Eurotrash, we've seen him do it better." Ann Hornaday of The Washington Post gave the film 1 star out of 4, writing, "You can't blame Liam Neeson, or the Taken producers, for trying to catch lightning in a bottle again. What you can blame them for is Taken 2, a sequel every bit as clumsy, ham-handed, outlandish and laughable as the original was sleek, tough and efficient."

=== Accolades ===
Award	Category	Recipient(s) and nominee(s)	Result
39th Saturn Awards	Best Action/Adventure Film	Taken 2	Nominated
39th People's Choice Awards	Favorite Dramatic Movie Actor	Liam Neeson	Nominated

=== Home media ===
Taken 2 was released on DVD and Blu-ray on 16 January 2013. The Blu-ray version was released with both the theatrical and unrated extended editions. As of 5 February 2015, the film has sold 2,823,133 DVDs and 1,053,690 Blu-ray discs, grossing $44,136,725 and $19,915,776 respectively and totaling $64,052,501 in North America.

== Sequel ==
A third film to the franchise, titled Taken 3, was released on 9 January 2015.
