= Morning (film) =

- Directed by: Leland Orser
- Screenplay by: Leland Orser
- Produced by: Minor Childers; Todd Traina
- Starring: Jeanne Tripplehorn; Leland Orser; Laura Linney; Elliott Gould; Kyle Chandler; Jason Ritter; Charlie McDermott; Julie White
- Cinematography: Paula Huidobro
- Edited by: Stan Salfas
- Music by: Michael Brook
- Production company: Red Rover Films
- Distributed by: Anchor Bay Films
- Release date: April 26, 2010
- Running time: 95 minutes
- Country: United States
- Language: English

Morning is a 2010 American drama film written, directed by and starring Leland Orser. The film also stars Jeanne Tripplehorn, Laura Linney and Elliott Gould. It is Orser's directorial debut. Morning is also based on Orser's 2007 short film of the same name.

The film premiered on April 26, 2010 at the 53rd San Francisco International Film Festival. It had a limited theatrical release in the United States on September 27, 2013 through Anchor Bay Films.

== Cast ==
- Jeanne Tripplehorn as Alice Munroe
- Leland Orser as Mark Munroe
- Laura Linney as Dr. Goodman
- Julie White as Mary
- Gina Morelli as Lluvia
- Kyle Chandler as Businessman
- Elliott Gould as Male Dr. Goodman
- Charlie McDermott as Jesse
- Jason Ritter as Hotel Receptionist
- Ewan Chung as Cosmetics Salesman
- Katie Traina as Young Mother Tracy
- Sawyer Ellis White as Boy
- Lydia Blanco as Sales Clerk
- Ellis Williams as Bartender
- Susan Dalian as Nurse
- Birdie Num Num as Dog

== Production ==
Morning was filmed in 21 days.

== Reception ==
The film has a 45% rating on Rotten Tomatoes.

Andrew Frisicano of Time Out gave the film two stars out of five.
