= Colombiana =

2011 film by Olivier Megaton

- French theatrical release poster
- Directed by: Olivier Megaton
- Written by: Luc Besson; Robert Mark Kamen
- Produced by: Luc Besson; Ariel Zeitoun
- Starring: Zoe Saldaña; Jordi Mollà; Lennie James; Michael Vartan; Cliff Curtis
- Cinematography: Romain Lacourbas
- Edited by: Camille Delamarre
- Music by: Nathaniel Méchaly
- Production companies: EuropaCorp; TF1 Films Production; Grive Productions; Canal+
- Distributed by: EuropaCorp Distribution
- Release date: 27 July 2011
- Running time: 108 minutes
- Country: France
- Languages: English; Spanish
- Budget: $40 million
- Box office: $63.5 million

Colombiana is a 2011 English-language French action thriller film directed by Olivier Megaton, from a screenplay by producer Luc Besson and Robert Mark Kamen. It stars Zoe Saldaña with supporting roles by Michael Vartan, Cliff Curtis, Lennie James, Callum Blue, and Jordi Mollà. The film is about Cataleya, a nine-year-old girl in Colombia whose family is killed by a drug lord. 15 years later, a grown Cataleya seeks her revenge.

The film began development as a sequel to Besson's film Léon: The Professional (1994), but was later re-tooled as a standalone film. It was released by EuropaCorp Distribution on 27 July 2011. Colombiana had a generally unfavorable reception from critics, but Saldaña's performance and action sequences were praised. It was a moderate commercial success, grossed $63.4 million against a $40 million production budget.

== Plot ==
In 1992, in Bogota, Colombia, drug baron Don Luis Sandoval sends his enforcer Marco and a gang of armed men to kill his gang member Fabio Restrepo and his family because Fabio has defied him by trying to leave his prolific drug crime activity behind. Fabio gives his nine-year-old daughter, Cataleya, a SmartMedia computer memory card loaded with information on Don Luis' business and tells her it's her "passport"; he also gives her the address of her uncle Emilio in Chicago, Illinois, who will take care of her. Finally, he leaves her with her mother's cataleya orchid necklace. After Fabio and his wife Alicia are gunned down, Cataleya escapes and seeks asylum at the U.S. Embassy. She is granted passage to the United States after handing over the memory card to embassy staff. Although American officials attempt to transfer her into the foster care system, Cataleya tracks down her uncle in Chicago and asks him to train her as a killer.

Fifteen years later in 2007, a grown Cataleya has become an accomplished assassin. Emilio serves as her broker, providing her with contracts. With each murder she commits, she leaves her signature, the Cattleya flower, hoping to one day attract the attention of Don Luis so she can take her revenge. When Emilio finds out about Cataleya's intentions and that she has been targeting men connected to the Don, he begs her to stop to avoid endangering the lives of his own family, but she admits that she does not care about the risk to his family. While she is spending the night with her American boyfriend, Danny Delanay, he takes a photo of her sleeping and then shows it to a friend, who then decides to run a background check on Cataleya, which alerts the FBI.

Meanwhile, FBI agent James Ross is working to identify the killer behind more than twenty unsolved murders, all of which have cataleya orchids left behind. He gets a pin on Cataleya's photo from the background check and orders her arrest, but Cataleya escapes and reaches out to Emilio, only to find that Don Luis's operatives had, indeed, caused the brutal slaughter of Emilio and his entire family. She confronts Ross at his home and threatens to kill him and his entire family, forcing him to reach out to CIA agent Steve Richard, who she knows is sheltering Don Luis from the law in exchange for his cooperation with American authorities. When she threatens to slaughter Richard's family, Richard gives her the Don's location.

Don Luis learns that Cataleya is still alive and organizes his men to kill her, but she ambushes them first and wipes out the entire gang, including Marco. Don Luis flees and swears revenge. Cataleya, having planted her specially trained attack dogs in his escape vehicle, orders them to eat Don Luis alive.

Danny is interrogated by Ross, and Cataleya calls him from a payphone; they talk briefly before Ross grabs Danny's phone, but Cataleya hangs up, leaving town on a bus.

== Cast ==
- Zoe Saldaña as Cataleya, a contract killer who seeks revenge when her drug dealing father and mother are murdered by their criminal associates
  - Amandla Stenberg as 9-year-old Cataleya
- Jordi Mollà as Marco, Don Luis' main enforcer and the man who executed Cataleya's parents while she watched
- Lennie James as James Ross, FBI Special Agent tasked with investigating Cataleya's assassinations
- Callum Blue as Steve Richard, CIA agent who arranged Don Luis' relocation and cooperation
- Cynthia Addai-Robinson as Alicia, Cataleya's mother who is killed along with her husband
- Jesse Borrego as Fabio, Cataleya's father and a drug business partner of Don Luis who was ordered killed when he tried to quit the criminal life
- Ofelia Medina as Mama, Emilio's mother
- Angel Garnica as Pepe, Emilio's father
- Sam Douglas as Willie Woodgard
- Graham McTavish as Head US Marshall Warren
- Max Martini as Agent Robert Williams
- Beto Benites as Don Luis Sandoval, a Colombian drug lord who ordered the killing of Cataleya's family, then cut a deal with the CIA
- Michael Vartan as Danny Delanay, Cataleya's boyfriend; an artist, he knows Cataleya as Jennifer
- Cliff Curtis as Emilio Restrepo, Cataleya's uncle and professional killer, who raises and trains her after her parents were killed

== Production ==
The script for Colombiana was based on Mathilda, which was originally written by Luc Besson as a sequel to Léon: The Professional. After a disagreement with Gaumont on how to proceed with the film, Besson and director Olivier Megaton reworked the script into a standalone film.

Filming began in August 2010 in locations including Chicago, New Orleans, Mexico, and France. The film was produced by Besson's EuropaCorp company and the script was written by Besson and Robert Mark Kamen.

David Martin-Jones, in an essay written for Senses of Cinema, stated that the film was likely to have been perceived by audiences to be an American Hollywood production, noting that "aping the look of a Hollywood genre film, with a non-US twist" had been used in previous European films.

== Reception ==
=== Critical response ===
On the review aggregator website Rotten Tomatoes, 28% of 106 critics' reviews are positive, with an average rating of 4.9/10. The website's consensus reads: "Zoe Saldana has the chops but she's taken out by erratic and sloppy filmmaking." Metacritic, which uses a weighted average, assigned the film a score of 45 out of 100, based on 22 critics, indicating "mixed or average" reviews. Audiences polled by CinemaScore gave the film an average grade of "A-" on an A+ to F scale.

Christy Lemire of The Associated Press reviewed Colombiana, writing that "The director of La Femme Nikita and The Fifth Element serves as co-writer and producer here, but this is very much a spin-off of his brand, a continuation of the kind of stereotype- and gravity-defying characters he's made his name on. Colombiana feels more hammy and muscular, though – but knowingly so, and that's what makes it solid, late-summer escapist fun." Betsy Sharkey of the Los Angeles Times wrote: "This B-movie blast of bloody blam blam is the latest chapter in the Luc Besson book of badly bruised lovelies who are better not crossed. What he began in 1990 with Nikita followed with Léon in '94 and '97's The Fifth Element, (the last written with Robert Mark Kamen, who co-wrote Colombiana with Besson), he refines in Colombiana." Claudia Puig of USA Today wrote: "This is a showy flower of an action film. Saldaña doesn't get much of a chance to emote, but her action skills blossom." Jordan Mintzer of The Hollywood Reporter, said that "There are guilty pleasures to be had in this frenzied B starring Zoe Saldaña, who gives an acrobatic performance that makes the overcooked material watchable."

=== Controversy ===
A nonprofit group called PorColombia criticized the film, saying that it stereotyped Colombia in a negative way. Carlos Macias, president of PorColombia, claimed that the film is proof of a "total lack of creativity" in Hollywood. When asked about the situation in an interview, Saldaña said "Shame on them? I don't know, I wish I knew how to address stupid unintelligent comments but I don't, I'm not a stupid person."

The following year, in an essay published in Senses of Cinema, David Martin-Jones focused on a different aspect of the South American character, believing that the film provided "a different perspective" concerning immigration and international wealth inequality. He notes that a "character from the global south wreaks havoc on the wealthy and corrupt in the global north", offering "a different perspective than is usually seen in a Hollywood blockbuster."

=== Box office ===
Colombiana grossed $36.7 million domestically (United States and Canada), and $26.8 million in other territories, for a worldwide total of $63.5 million, against a budget of $40 million. It opened at No. 2, in the first of its three consecutive weeks in the Top 10 at the domestic box office.

== Potential sequel ==
At the 2015 CineEurope, when the production house EuropaCorp announced upcoming films, it mentioned that Colombiana 2 was in development. While Saldaña responded to an interviewer in 2017, that she would not mind reprising her role as Cataleya, as of 2026 no such sequel exists.

== See also ==
- Colombia in popular culture
