= Love and Other Disasters =

2006 film by Alek Keshishian

- Theatrical release poster
- Directed by: Alek Keshishian
- Written by: Alek Keshishian
- Produced by: Alek Keshishian; Alison Owen; Virginie Besson-Silla
- Starring: Brittany Murphy; Matthew Rhys; Catherine Tate; Santiago Cabrera
- Cinematography: Pierre Morel
- Edited by: Nick Arthurs
- Music by: Alexandre Azaria
- Production companies: EuropaCorp; Skyline Films; Ruby Films
- Distributed by: EuropaCorp Distribution
- Release dates: 9 September 2006 (Toronto); 25 April 2007 (France)
- Running time: 90 minutes
- Countries: France; United Kingdom
- Language: English
- Budget: $9 million

Love and Other Disasters is a 2006 romantic comedy film written and directed by Alek Keshishian. It had its world premiere at the 2006 Toronto International Film Festival. In 2008, the film had its UK premiere in London as the gala screening for the BFI 22nd London Gay and Lesbian Film Festival.

Brittany Murphy portrays an assistant at British Vogue who is the catalyst for a group of young friends as they try to find love. Outfest 2007 presented the film as one of their features. Keshishian originally wanted Gwyneth Paltrow to play Jacks, but she was pregnant at the time. Paltrow was later given a cameo role.

== Plot ==
Emily "Jacks" Jackson is an American transplant living in London and working as an intern at British Vogue. She shares an apartment with her gay friend Peter Simon, a screenwriter. Afraid to be disappointed by a serious relationship, Jacks prefers to spend her free time with her friends and sleep with her ex-boyfriend, James, whom she does not love.

Peter, who has never been in a relationship, spends too much time in his dreams and as a result cannot fall in love with a real person. It gets more complicated with the entrance of Paolo, an assistant for one of the photographers at Vogue. As the film develops, they come to realize their mistakes and eventually reach their happy endings.

== Cast ==
- Brittany Murphy as Emily 'Jacks' Jackson
- Matthew Rhys as Peter Simon
- Santiago Cabrera as Paolo Sarmiento
- Catherine Tate as Tallulah Riggs-Wentworth
- Elliot Cowan as James Wildstone
- Adam Rayner as Tom / Fantasy David
- Jamie Sives as Finlay McMillian
- Will Keen as David Williams
- Frédéric Anscombre as Sascha Santori
- Stephanie Beacham as Felicity Riggs-Wentworth
- Daniel Lobé as Freedom
- Sam Bloom as Pandora
- Jamie Honeybourne as Unicorn Gallagher
- Robert Chilcott as art patron
- Dawn French as therapist
- Michael Lerner as Marvin Bernstein
- Gwyneth Paltrow as herself playing Jacks (cameo)
- Orlando Bloom as himself playing Paolo (cameo)

== Reception ==
David Rooney of Variety wrote, "wanly conceived effort looks an unlikely bet for significant bigscreen dates" and "Keshishian’s script is sloppy in both setting up and sustaining the sexual identity confusion that fuels the comic engine".

Greg Hernandez of Out in Hollywood called it "a damned entertaining film", "well-written and well-directed by Alek Keshishian and wonderfully acted" and "includes a hilarious scene featuring cameos by Gwyneth Paltrow and Orlando Bloom."
