= Famke Janssen =

Dutch actress and model (born 1964)

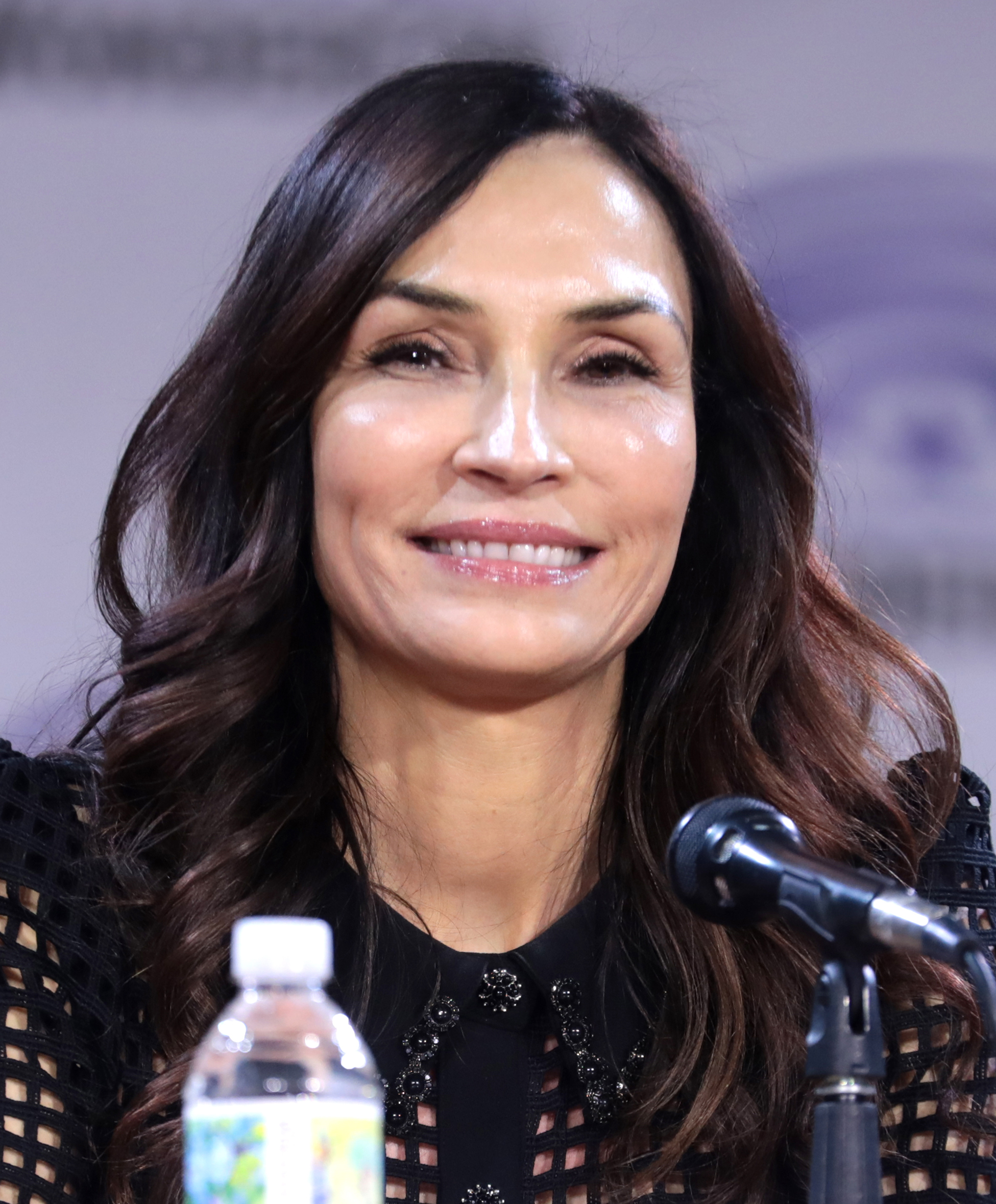
- Janssen at the 2023 WonderCon
- Born: Famke Beumer Janssen; 5 November 1964 (age 62); Amstelveen, Netherlands
- Education: Columbia University
- Occupations: Actress; former model
- Years active: 1984–1992 (model); 1992–present (actress)
- Spouse: Kip Williams (m. 1989; div. 2000)
- Relatives: Antoinette Beumer (sister); Marjolein Beumer (sister)

Famke Beumer Janssen (Dutch pronunciation: [ˈfɑmkə ˈbøːmər ˈjɑnsə(n)]; born 5 November 1964) is a Dutch actress and former model acting in Hollywood. She played Xenia Onatopp in GoldenEye (1995), Jean Grey / Phoenix in the X-Men film series (2000–2014), and Lenore Mills in the Taken film trilogy (2008–2014). In 2008, she was appointed a Goodwill Ambassador for Integrity by the United Nations. She made her directorial debut with Bringing Up Bobby in 2011. She is also known for her roles in the Netflix original series Hemlock Grove (2013–2015), FX's Nip/Tuck (2003–2010), and ABC's How to Get Away with Murder (2015–2020). Janssen starred in the 2017 NBC crime thriller The Blacklist: Redemption. She starred in the Netflix Dutch crime series Amsterdam Empire (2025).

== Early life ==
Famke Beumer Janssen was born on November 5, 1964, in Amstelveen, the Netherlands. She has two sisters, director Antoinette Beumer and actress Marjolein Beumer, both of whom changed their surnames to Beumer after their parents divorced.

In addition to her native Dutch, Janssen speaks English and French. She learned German, but has not kept up with it. Following her high school graduation, Janssen studied economics for a year at the University of Amsterdam, which she later called "the stupidest idea I ever had." In the early 1990s, she enrolled at Columbia University's School of General Studies to study creative writing and literature.

== Career ==
In 1984, Janssen moved to the United States to begin her professional career as a fashion model. She signed with Elite Model Management and worked for Yves Saint Laurent, Giorgio Armani, Chanel, and Victoria's Secret. She starred in a 1988 commercial for the perfume Exclamation by Coty. Her looks have been compared to 1940s movie stars like Hedy Lamarr.

After retiring from modelling in the early 1990s, Janssen had guest roles on several television series, including a role in the 1992 Star Trek: The Next Generation episode "The Perfect Mate", as empathic metamorph Kamala, opposite Patrick Stewart, with whom she later starred in the X-Men film series. That same year, Janssen was offered the role of Jadzia Dax in Star Trek: Deep Space Nine, but turned it down to pursue film roles. Her first film role was alongside Jeff Goldblum in the 1992 crime drama film Fathers & Sons.

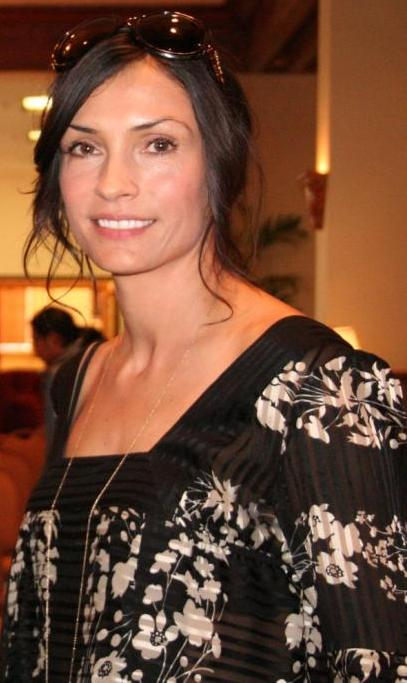
Janssen in 2008

In 1995, Janssen appeared in Pierce Brosnan's debut James Bond film, GoldenEye, as femme fatale Xenia Onatopp. She appeared in Lord of Illusions with Scott Bakula. In an attempt to fight against typecasting after her Bond girl performance, Janssen began seeking out more intriguing supporting roles, appearing in John Irvin's City of Industry, Woody Allen's Celebrity, Robert Altman's The Gingerbread Man, and Ted Demme's Monument Ave. Denis Leary, her co-star in Monument Ave., was impressed by how easily she blended in, initially not recognizing her, as she was already in character. In the late 1990s, she appeared in The Faculty, Rounders, Deep Rising, and House on Haunted Hill.

In 2000, Janssen played superhero Dr. Jean Grey in the 20th Century Fox film X-Men. She later reprised the role in the 2003 sequel, X2, where her character shows signs of increasing powers, but at the end of the film, she is presumably killed. Janssen returns as Jean, whose death in X2 awoke her dark alternate personality, Phoenix, in X-Men: The Last Stand (2006). For that role, she won a Saturn Award for Best Supporting Actress. She returned as Jean in the 2013 film The Wolverine as a hallucination of Wolverine, followed by a brief cameo for X-Men: Days of Future Past (2014).

In 2002, Janssen landed the role of villainess Serleena in Men in Black II, but had to abandon the film due to a death in her family and was replaced by Lara Flynn Boyle. Janssen had a prominent role in the second season of the TV series Nip/Tuck, as the seductive and manipulative life coach Ava Moore, which earned her Hollywood Life's Breakthrough Artist of the Year Award. She reprised her role in the final two episodes of the series.

In 2007, she starred in Turn the River, for which she was awarded the Special Recognition Best Actress Award at the Hamptons International Film Festival. The following year, she starred in Luc Besson's Taken. Janssen continued to work in television, appearing in TV pilots for NBC's police drama Winters and Showtime's The Farm, a spinoff of The L Word, set in a women's prison. Both pilots were rejected by their networks. Janssen provided the Dutch language narration for the Studio Tram Tour at all Disney theme parks.

In 2011, Janssen made her directorial debut with the drama Bringing Up Bobby. She wrote the screenplay to the film, which stars Milla Jovovich, Bill Pullman, and Marcia Cross. She reprised her role as Lenore Mills in Taken 2 (2012) and Taken 3 (2014). She starred as the main villain Muriel in Hansel & Gretel: Witch Hunters (2013).

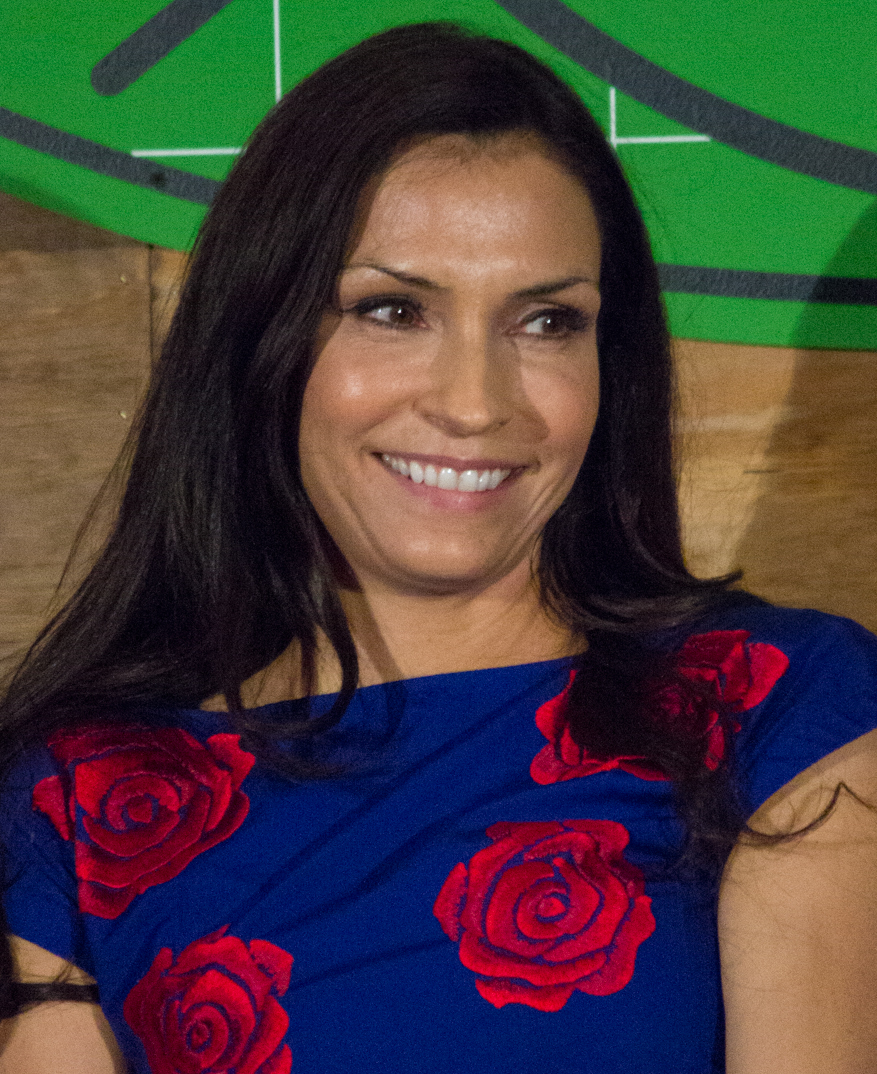
Janssen in 2014

Janssen starred in the Netflix original horror thriller television series Hemlock Grove, wherein she plays the role of family matriarch Olivia Godfrey. Janssen had a recurring role in the ABC crime thriller television series How To Get Away With Murder, appearing in ten episodes throughout the series, beginning her role in season two of the show and concluding it in the series finale.

Janssen was cast in a starring role in the NBC crime thriller The Blacklist: Redemption, a spin-off of the NBC series The Blacklist, in March 2016; it was picked up to series in May 2016. The following month, Janssen expressed frustration at not being cast in X-Men: Apocalypse, saying Hollywood was sexist toward older women. She said: "Women, it's interesting because they're replaced, and the older versions are never to be seen again... whereas the men are allowed to be both ages."

In 2019, she served as a juror for the Tribeca Film Festival. Also in 2019, Janssen joined Jeffrey Dean Morgan in The Postcard Killings, which was released in 2020. In 2021, Janssen starred in the Christian romantic drama film Redeeming Love and the action-thriller Dangerous.

In a March 2021 interview, she revealed to Forbes some details about her involvement with the live-action adaptation of Saint Seiya, a popular anime and manga. Janssen said that filming was supposed to take place in Europe the previous year, but production had been postponed twice due to the coronavirus pandemic. She also hinted that she would play one of the main characters, but did not specify their name. The movie, titled Knights of the Zodiac, was eventually released in 2023, with Janssen playing the role of Vander Guraad.

Janssen made her first Dutch-language acting appearance in the 2025 Netflix crime drama series Amsterdam Empire, set in Amsterdam's cannabis scene, where she stars as Betty, an ex-pop diva seeking revenge. She also served as an executive producer on the series. In January 2026, X-Men writer Chris Claremont stated that Janssen would reprise the role of Jean Grey in Avengers: Doomsday. In June 2026, Jannssen stated despite speculation she was not in Avengers: Doomsday.

== Activism ==
Janssen appeared with her dog, Licorice, a brindle Boston Terrier, in a 2007 PETA campaign to raise awareness for animal rights. The campaign used the slogan "Be an Angel for Animals." On 28 January 2008, she was appointed a Goodwill Ambassador for Integrity for the United Nations Office on Drugs and Crime at a United Nations anticorruption conference held in Nusa Dua, Bali.

== Personal life ==
From 1989 to 2000, Janssen was married to writer and director Kip Williams, son of architect Tod Williams.

== Filmography ==
=== Film ===
Year	Title	Role	Notes	Refs.
1992	Fathers & Sons	Kyle Christian		
1994	Relentless IV: Ashes to Ashes	Dr. Sara Lee Jaffee	Direct-to-video	
1994	Model by Day	Lex / Lady X	Television film	
1995	Lord of Illusions	Dorothea Swann		
1995	GoldenEye	Xenia Onatopp		
1996	Dead Girl	Treasure		
1997	City of Industry	Rachel Montana		
1998	Monument Ave.	Katy O'Connor		
1998	The Gingerbread Man	Leeanne Magruder		
1998	Deep Rising	Trillian St. James		
1998	RPM	Claudia Haggs		
1998	Rounders	Petra		
1998	Celebrity	Bonnie		
1998	The Adventures of Sebastian Cole	Fiona		
1998	The Faculty	Miss Elizabeth Burke		
1999	House on Haunted Hill	Evelyn Stockard-Price		
2000	Love & Sex	Kate Welles		
2000	Circus	Lily Garfield		
2000	X-Men	Jean Grey		
2001	Made	Jessica		
2001	Don't Say a Word	Agatha "Aggie" Conrad		
2002	I Spy	Special Agent Rachel Wright		
2003	X2: X-Men United	Jean Grey		
2004	Eulogy	Judy Arnolds		
2005	Hide and Seek	Dr. Katherine Carson		
2006	X-Men: The Last Stand	Jean Grey / Phoenix		
2006	The Treatment	Allegra Marshall		
2007	The Ten	Gretchen Reigert		
2007	Turn the River	Kailey Sullivan		
2007	Winters	Christie Winters	Television film	
2008	The Wackness	Kristen Squires		
2008	Taken	Lenore "Lenny" Mills-St. John		
2008	100 Feet	Marnie Watson	Direct-to-video film	
2009	The Farm	Valentina Galindo	Television film	
2010	The Chameleon	Jennifer Johnson	Direct-to-video film	
2011	Down the Shore	Mary Reed		
2012	Taken 2	Lenore "Lenny" Mills-St. John		
2013	Hansel & Gretel: Witch Hunters	Muriel		
2013	The Wolverine	Jean Grey		
2013	The Being Experience	N/A	Originally titled In the Woods	
2014	A Fighting Man	Diane Schuler	Direct-to-video film	
2014	X-Men: Days of Future Past	Jean Grey / Phoenix	Cameo	
2014	Taken 3	Lenore "Lenny" Mills-St. John		
2015	Unity	Narrator (voice)	Documentary	
2015	Jack of the Red Hearts	Kay Adams		
2017	The Show	Ilana Katz		
2017	All I Wish	Vanessa		
2017	Once Upon a Time in Venice	Katey Ford		
2018	Status Update	Katherine Alden		
2018	Bayou Caviar	Nic	Originally titled Louisiana Caviar	
2018	Asher	Sophie		
2019	The Poison Rose	Jayne Hunt		
2019	Primal	Dr. Ellen Taylor		
2020	The Postcard Killings	Valerie Kanon		
2020	Endless	Lee Douglas		
2021	The Vault	Margaret	Originally titled Way Down	
2021	Dangerous	Agent Shaughnessy		
2022	Redeeming Love	Duchess		
2023	Door Mouse	Mama		
2023	Knights of the Zodiac	Vander Guraad		
2023	Boy Kills World	Hilda Van Der Koy		
2023	Locked In	Katherine	Direct-to-streaming film	
2024	Deadpool & Wolverine	Jean Grey / Phoenix	Uncredited; Archive footage from X-Men film series	
2027	One Second After	Mayor Kate Lindsey	Post-production	
TBA	The Experiment	Doctor Rachel McVeigh	Post-production	

=== Television ===
Year	Title	Role	Notes
1992	Star Trek: The Next Generation	Kamala	Episode: "The Perfect Mate"
1994	Melrose Place	Diane Adamson	Episode: "Michael's Game"
1994	The Untouchables	Cleo	Episode: "Voyeur"
2000–2001	Ally McBeal	Jamie	2 episodes
2004–2010	Nip/Tuck	Ava Moore	Recurring role, 11 episodes
2008	Puppy Love	Maya	Web series
2013–2015	Hemlock Grove	Olivia Godfrey	Main role
2015–2020	How to Get Away with Murder	Eve Rothlo	Recurring role, 10 episodes
2015	SuperMansion	Frau Mantis (voice)	2 episodes
2016	Robot Chicken	Jean Grey (voice)	Episode: "Joel Hurwitz"
2016–2018	The Blacklist	Susan Hargrave	Recurring role, 5 episodes
2017	The Blacklist: Redemption	Susan Hargrave	Main role
2019	When They See Us	Nancy Ryan	Miniseries, 2 episodes
2019	The Capture	Jessica Mallory	Episode: "Correction"
2022	Long Slow Exhale	Melinda Barrington	Recurring role
2025	Amsterdam Empire	Betty Jonkers	Main role, also executive producer (Netflix)

=== As director ===
- Bringing Up Bobby (2011), as director, producer, writer

== Awards and nominations ==
Year	Association	Category	Nominated work	Result	Ref(s)
1996	MTV Movie Awards	MTV Movie Award for Best Fight (Shared with Pierce Brosnan)	GoldenEye	Nominated	
2000	Blockbuster Entertainment Awards	Favorite Supporting Actress – Horror	House on Haunted Hill	Nominated	
2000	Fangoria Chainsaw Awards	Best Supporting Actress	House on Haunted Hill	Nominated	
2001	Blockbuster Entertainment Awards	Favorite Supporting Actress – Science Fiction	X-Men	Nominated	
2006	Hamptons International Film Festival	Golden Starfish Award for Career Achievement	The Treatment	Won	
2006	High Falls Film Festival	Susan B. Anthony "Failure is Impossible" Award	The Treatment	Won	
2006	Scream Awards	Sexiest Superhero	X-Men: The Last Stand	Nominated	
2006	Scream Awards	Best Superhero	X-Men: The Last Stand	Nominated	
2006	Scream Awards	Best Flesh Scene (Shared with Hugh Jackman)	X-Men: The Last Stand	Won	
2006	Teen Choice Awards	Choice Movie: Liplock (Shared with Hugh Jackman)	X-Men: The Last Stand	Nominated	
2007	Hamptons International Film Festival	Special Recognition	Turn the River	Won	
2007	Hamptons International Film Festival	Special Prize	Turn the River	Won	
2007	Saturn Awards	Best Supporting Actress	X-Men: The Last Stand	Won	
2016	Gold Derby Awards	Best Drama Guest Actress	How to Get Away with Murder	Nominated	
