= Leland Orser =

American actor (b. 1960)

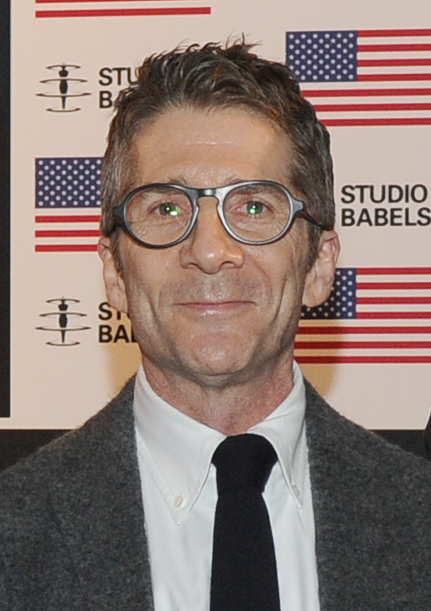
- Orser in 2016
- Born: Leland Jones Orser; August 6, 1960 (age 66); San Francisco, California, U.S.
- Education: Connecticut College
- Occupation: Actor
- Years active: 1991–present
- Spouses: Roma Downey (m. 1987; div. 1989) Jeanne Tripplehorn (m. 2000)
- Children: 1

Leland Jones Orser (born August 6, 1960) is an American actor, director and writer. He has appeared in numerous film and television roles since his debut in 1991, notably as Lucien Dubenko on the television series ER (2004–09), Father Romero on Ray Donovan (2015–16), Richard Stratton on American Gigolo (2022), and Sam Gilroy in the Taken film series (2008–14).

== Early life ==
Orser was born in San Francisco, California on August 6, 1960. He graduated from Connecticut College in 1982, and studied Acting at Drama Studio London.

== Career ==
Orser began his career as a stage actor, and was nominated for a Helen Hayes Award for Best Supporting Actor for his performance in The Secret Rapture in 1991. That same year, he made his television debut in 1991 on the series Gabriel's Fire, and went on to appear in programs such as The Golden Girls, Cheers, L.A. Law, The X-Files, NYPD Blue, The Pretender, Law & Order: Special Victims Unit and CSI: Crime Scene Investigation. In 1999, he played Dr. Arthur Zeller in The Outer Limits episode "Descent".

He appeared in Seven (1995) as a man who was involuntarily recruited to kill a prostitute. He was credited as "Crazed Man in Massage Parlour". He played Larry Purvis in Alien Resurrection (1997).

He played the antagonist Richard Thompson in the Denzel Washington thriller The Bone Collector (1999). In 2001, he had a role in Pearl Harbor as an injured officer saved by Kate Beckinsale's character. In 2003, he appeared as Wesley Owen Welch in the Marvel Comics superhero film Daredevil.

Orser also appeared in various roles in the Star Trek franchise, among them playing a Changeling posing as the Romulan Colonel Lovok in the Star Trek: Deep Space Nine episode "The Die Is Cast" and in the episode "Sanctuary" playing a bit part as a member of the Skrreean race. He also played a homicidal hologram in the Star Trek: Voyager episode "Revulsion". In Star Trek: Enterprise, he played the character "Loomis" in the time-travel episode "Carpenter Street".

He played Ansel in the drama thriller film Faults. From 2004–09, he played Chief of Surgery Dr. Lucien Dubenko, a recurring character, on ER. Most recently he has appeared as Sam in all three of the Taken film series.

In 2010, Orser made his directorial debut with the film Morning.

== Personal life ==
Orser married Roma Downey in 1987; they divorced in 1989. In 2000, he married Jeanne Tripplehorn, with whom he had co-starred in Peter Berg's dark comedy Very Bad Things; they have one son.

== Filmography ==
=== Film ===
Year	Title	Role	Notes
1993	Cover Story	Julian	
1995	Baby Face Nelson	Benny Bakst	
1995	Dead Badge	Pellman	
1995	Phoenix	Doctor Riley	
1995	Girl in the Cadillac	Used car salesman	
1995	Seven	Crazed Man in Massage Parlour	
1996	Invader	Michael Perkett, NASA	
1996	Escape from L.A.	Test Tube	
1996	Independence Day	Tech / Medical Assistant #1	
1996	Red Ribbon Blues	James	
1997	Excess Baggage	Detective Barnaby	
1997	Alien Resurrection	Larry Purvis	
1998	Very Bad Things	Charles Moore	
1998	Saving Private Ryan	Lieutenant DeWindt	
1999	Resurrection	Det. Andrew Hollinsworth	
1999	The Bone Collector	Richard Thompson	
2000	Rebel Yell	Billy Idol	
2001	Pearl Harbor	Major Jackson	
2003	Daredevil	Wesley Owen Welch	
2003	Confidence	Lionel Dolby	
2003	Runaway Jury	Lamb	
2004	Twisted	Edmund Cutler	
2006	The Good German	Bernie	
2008	Taken	Sam Gilroy	
2009	Give 'Em Hell, Malone	Murphy	
2010	Morning	Mark	Also director and screenwriter
2012	Taken 2	Sam Gilroy	
2014	The Guest	Spencer Peterson	
2014	Faults	Ansel Roth	
2014	The Gambler	Larry	
2014	Taken 3	Sam Gilroy	
2015	The Devil's Candy	Preacher	
2018	Blindspotting	Judge	
2019	The Art of Self-Defense	Detective McAllister	
2022	Amsterdam	Mr. Nevins	

=== Television ===
Year	Title	Role	Notes
1991	The Golden Girls	Waiter	Episode: "The Case of the Libertine Belle"
1992	Cheers	Guy at table saying he needs a tune up	Episode: "Do Not Forsake Me, O' My Postman"
1993	Star Trek: Deep Space Nine	Gai	Episode: "Sanctuary"
1994	The X-Files	Jason Ludwig	Episode: "Firewalker"
1994–1997	NYPD Blue	Zeppo, Carl, John Highsmith	3 episodes
1995	Star Trek: Deep Space Nine	Colonel Lovok/Changeling	Episode: "The Die is Cast"
1995	Ned & Stacey	Phil	Episode: "Portrait of a Marriage"
1995	Piranha	Terry Wechsler	TV movie
1995	Murder One	Myron Elkins	Episode: "Chapter 2"
	Married... with Children	Director	Episode: "The Naked and the Dead, But Mostly the Naked"
	Married... with Children	Director	Episode: "The Two That Got Away"
1996	Married... with Children	Director	Episode: "Kiss of the Coffee Woman"
1997	Star Trek: Voyager	Dejaren	Episode: "Revulsion"
1998–2000	The Pretender	Argyle	3 episodes: "Amnesia", "Unsinkable", "Cold Dick"
1999	The Outer Limits	Dr. Arthur Zeller	Episode: "Descent"
2002	CSI: Crime Scene Investigation	Morris Pearson	Episode: "Stalker"
2003	Star Trek: Enterprise	Loomis	Episode: "Carpenter Street"
2003	Law & Order: Special Victims Unit	Kevin Walker	Episode: "Coerced"
2004–2009	ER	Dr. Lucien Dubenko	61 episodes
2005	CSI: Crime Scene Investigation	Dr. Malcom Parker	Episode: "Gum Drops"
2007	Shark	Brent Gilroy	Episode: "Porn Free"
2009	24	Martin Collier	4 episodes
2009	Law & Order: Criminal Intent		1 episode
2012	Magic City	Mike Strauss	2 episodes
2012	A Gifted Man	Charlie Reinhart	Episode: "In Case of (Re)Birth"
2012	Scandal	Sanders Black	Episode: "Enemy of the State"
2013	Touch	Dr. Linus	3 episodes: "Accused", "Fight or Flight", "Leviathan"
2013	Revolution	John Sanborn	3 episodes: "The Stand", "Ghosts", "Clue"
2015–2016	Ray Donovan	Father Romero	10 episodes
2016–2019	Berlin Station	Robert Kirsch	27 episodes
2019	I Am the Night	Peter Sullivan	Miniseries; 4 episodes
2021	Brand New Cherry Flavor	Mike Nathans	2 episodes
2021–2023	Blindspotting	Carl	3 episodes
2022	American Gigolo	Richard Stratton	Main cast
2025	Law & Order: Special Victims Unit	Harris Vernon	Episode: "First Light"
