= Amsterdam Empire =

Dutch television series

- Created by: Nico Moolenaar; Bart Uytdenhouwen; Piet Matthys
- Directed by: Jonas Govaerts
- Starring: Famke Janssen; Jacob Derwig; Elise Schaap; Romana Vrede; Jade Olieberg; Yannick van de Velde; Jesse Mensah
- Countries of origin: Netherlands; Belgium
- No. of series: 1
- No. of episodes: 7

Production
- Executive producer: Famke Janssen

Original release
- Network: Netflix
- Release: 30 October 2025

Amsterdam Empire is a 2025 Dutch crime drama television series created by Nico Moolenaar, Piet Matthys and Bart Uytdenhouwen. The series stars Famke Janssen and Jacob Derwig in the lead roles. It premiered on Netflix on 30 October 2025.

== Premise ==
With her marriage on the brink of collapse, a former pop star threatens to expose the dark secrets of her coffee-shop mogul husband.

== Cast ==
- Famke Janssen as Betty Jonkers
- Jacob Derwig as Jack van Doorn
- Elise Schaap as Marjolein Hofman
- Jade Olieberg as Katja van Doorn
- Yannick van de Velde as Erik Ketels
- Jesse Mensah as Patrick van Doorn

== Production ==
The seven-part series was created by Nico Moolenaar, Bart Uytdenhouwen and Piet Matthys. It stars Famke Janssen and Jacob Derwig, alongside Elise Schaap, Jade Olieberg, Yannick van de Velde and Jesse Mensah. Janssen also serves as an executive producer. The series was directed by Jonas Govaerts and produced by Pupkin Film in collaboration with A Team Productions.

For the series, Famke Janssen collaborated with Netherlands-based musician Palmbomen to record the song Forever Pour Toujours, released through Netflix music, with accompanying music video.

== Release ==
Amsterdam Empire premiered globally on Netflix on 30 October 2025.
