= Taken (2017 TV series) =

French-American drama series based on the Taken film trilogy

- Genre: Crime drama; Action; Thriller
- Based on: Taken by Luc Besson; Robert Mark Kamen
- Developed by: Alexander Cary
- Showrunners: Alexander Cary; Greg Plageman
- Starring: Clive Standen; Gaius Charles; Brooklyn Sudano; Monique Gabriela Curnen; Michael Irby; Jose Pablo Cantillo; James Landry Hébert; Jennifer Beals; Adam Goldberg; Jessica Camacho
- Composer: Trevor Morris
- Countries of origin: United States; France
- Original language: English
- No. of seasons: 2
- No. of episodes: 26

Production
- Executive producers: Matthew Gross; Edouard de Vesinne; Thomas Anargyros
- Producer: Luc Besson
- Camera setup: Single-camera
- Running time: 41–43 minutes
- Production companies: FLW Films; EuropaCorp Television; Universal Television; Boomerang Productions; Matthew Gross Entertainment

Original release
- Network: NBC (United States); Altice Studio (France)
- Release: February 27, 2017 – June 30, 2018

Taken is an action-thriller television series based on the Taken film series. It is an origin story for Bryan Mills (Clive Standen), the character played by Liam Neeson in the trilogy. The series was commissioned with a straight-to-series-order in September 2015 and premiered on February 27, 2017, on NBC. NBC renewed the series for a second season of 16 episodes on May 9, 2017, that premiered on January 12, 2018. NBC removed the series from its schedule on April 18, 2018, and then announced that it would return on May 26, 2018. NBC canceled the series on May 11, 2018, and the final episode aired on June 30.

== Premise ==
Former Green Beret Bryan Mills must overcome a personal tragedy in order to get revenge while becoming a CIA superspy.

== Cast ==
=== Main ===
- Clive Standen as Bryan Mills
- Jennifer Beals as Christina Hart
- Gaius Charles as John (season 1)
- Brooklyn Sudano as Asha (season 1)
- Monique Gabriela Curnen as Vlasik (season 1)
- Michael Irby as Scott (season 1)
- Jose Pablo Cantillo as Dave (season 1)
- James Landry Hébert as Rem (season 1)
- Adam Goldberg as Kilroy (season 2)
- Jessica Camacho as Santana (season 2)

=== Recurring ===
- Dominic Fumusa as Harry Ward (season 1)
- Jennifer Marsala as Riley (season 1)
- Simu Liu as Faaron (season 1)
- Ali Kazmi as Marzoki (season 1)
- Layla Alizada as Elena Morales (season 1)
- Peter Outerbridge as James Casey (season 2)
- Christian Bako as Krystiyan (season 2)
- Tahmoh Penikett as David Ramsey (Season 2)

== Production ==
The funeral scenes, and scenes in and around the Mills family home were filmed at the Christ Anglican Church and a period home at the corner of George and William Streets in Port Stanley, Ontario, Canada.

The rest of the series is filmed in Toronto, Ontario, primarily at Cinespace Film Studios' Kipling Avenue facility.

At the end of the first season the show was radically overhauled, with showrunner Alexander Cary leaving the series, and Greg Plageman (Person of Interest) coming in as the second season showrunner. With the exception of Clive Standen (Bryan Mills) and Jennifer Beals (Christina Hart), all of the first season main cast exited the series at the same time.

== Episodes ==
=== Series overview ===
Season	Episodes	Originally released	
Season	Episodes	First released	Last released
1	10	February 27, 2017	May 1, 2017
2	16	January 12, 2018	June 30, 2018

=== Season 1 (2017) ===
No. overall	No. in season	Title	Directed by	Written by	Original release date	U.S. viewers (millions)
1	1	"Pilot"	Alex Graves	Alexander Cary	February 27, 2017	7.45
Mills's sister is killed in a train shootout with two persons he believes to be random terrorists. Hart, a Deputy Director with Special Portfolio at the Office of the Director of National Intelligence, and her team start tracking Mills, learning that he killed the son of Carlos Mejia, a terrorist and drug lord, while saving Mike Hall, a DEA undercover agent, in Colombia in 2015. Deducing that Mejia was behind the murder, Mills leaves his parents to keep them safe. He learns that Hall is working with the terrorists and abducts him, deciding to spare his life after learning that they threatened Hall's daughter. Mills surrenders to Mejia's men, who take Mills to Mejia. Hart's operatives intervene and stop Mills from killing Mejia. Hart asks Mills to join her team.
2	2	"Ready"	Michael Offer	Alexander Cary & Joe Loya	March 6, 2017	6.09
Having joined the team, Mills fails to operate effectively due to his sister's death. Using intelligence provided by Mejia, Hart sends a tactical team, excluding Mills, to Ukraine to capture a drug lord. However, Mills's precision saves Dave from a grenade explosion. A Senator dies, apparently due to a heart attack. CIA agent Clara Ward contacts Hart and reveals that it was an assassination, arranging a meeting. The former is killed by a mercenary, later identified as William Davis. Hart is also critically shot and taken to a hospital, where Harry, Clara's husband, tells her about Operation Fortunata, which is for human trafficking of refugees from Syria. Locating Davis, John includes Mills in the team. Mills manages to capture Davis, who is critically wounded and moved to a hospital, where other mercenaries attack, but fail due to Mills' intervention. Davis and his co-worker reveal their employer's name, whom Hart forces to confess by using the same poison. Meanwhile, Mills acquires footage of Mejia's cell. Mills and Asha, his sister's friend, become closer. He tells her about his plan to kill Mejia.
3	3	"Off Side"	Tim Matheson	Anthony Swofford & Wendy West	March 13, 2017	5.73
Ismat Zahad, a Muslim American under surveillance, suddenly disappears from the cameras, forcing Hart to assemble the team. Mills convinces Asha to stay at his house until the threat is over. It is revealed that Zahad was actually abducted by an American group. The team captures one, Mike Gilroy, whom they force to cooperate by placing him in the same room with a convict who longs to kill him. Gilroy's handler gives the location of Zahad, who is wearing a suicide vest that will be exploded unless Gilroy is delivered. Hart takes Gilroy to the exchange location, where John's team are supporting her with sniper rifles, while Mills is staying with Zahad. Mills manages to defuse the bomb, giving John's team the chance to kill Gilroy's cooperatives. Hart's team learns that Gilroy, who is delivered to the FBI, was working for Bert Keagy, the Chief of Staff of the Secretary of Defense. Keagy confirms to Hart that neither the Secretary nor the President are involved. Mills assassinates him on her order. He befriends Zahad and his son. Meanwhile, Hart is revealed to have a brain tumor.
4	4	"Mattie G"	Romeo Tirone	Marjorie David	March 20, 2017	4.72
Dan Glynn, Riley's contact in Ingersol Pharmaceuticals, whose new drug, Sangravan, has killed several people due to unannounced side effects, acquires the medical test reports, which can be used as evidence for incrimination. The Team secures Dan, whose daughter, Mattie, is revealed to have been kidnapped by Ingersol. At the exchange location, Mills fails to rescue Mattie, but kills the brother of Tom Solitzki, the Ingersol head of security. Solitzki demands Mills to come personally with the records to the new location. Mills manages to dominate the Ingersol operatives before infiltrating the building and killing the remaining ones, including Solitzki. He returns Mattie to Dan. In a Senate Hearing, Hart reveals the records, leading to arrests of several Ingersol figures. Meanwhile, a stalker appears in Asha's neighborhood, with the police advising her to stay at somewhere else until he is captured. She moves to Mills'. They eventually develop romance. Mejia's operatives are revealed to be watching him.
5	5	"A Clockwork Swiss"	Clark Johnson	Jordan Hawley	March 27, 2017	5.04
Tracy, the Associate Attorney General, tells Hart about a group of bankers who are planning to cripple the U.S. economy. He states that his contact in Zurich, Switzerland has critical information for future indictments, forcing Hart's compliance by revealing to have evidence of Keagy's assassination. Hart's team fails to prevent Byron Caine, the bankers' operative, from killing the contact, who gives Mills the keycard to a safety deposit box. Casey convinces the team to infiltrate the bank and acquire the information, which they do and escape. Caine gives chase to their van; but the team takes refuge in the Israeli Embassy, leading to Caine's arrest. Mills watches the video, which is revealed to be only a goodbye tape by the contact, who was also Tracy's boyfriend. Hart deduces that the bankers intended to blackmail Tracy using the video. She forces Tracy to proceed with his indictments. Meanwhile, Mejia's operatives hack into the cameras in Asha's, finding the location of Mejia's incarceration using Mills, who is revealed to be still obsessed with Mejia.
6	6	"Hail Mary"	Lexi Alexander	Mike Daniels	April 3, 2017	4.67
A CIA asset named Yuri fails to convince his girlfriend, Tatjana Kuznikov, also the wife of SVR officer Sergei, to defect to the U.S. with him. After two CIA agents are killed in the failed extraction, the Team heads to Saint Petersburg, where they capture Yuri, who tells them about Tatjana. They rescue Tatjana just as Sergei suddenly arrives and engages Mills, who overpowers him and escapes with the others. Tatjana is revealed to be pregnant from Yuri. The Team deduces the presence of a mole in the operation, believed to be Gretchen Lareau, Yuri's supervisor, after John and Faaron break in her house and find incriminating files. However, Hart deduces Brant Pope, a Divisional Director, to be the mole, luring him into confessing. Mills forces Sergei to smuggle the Team, Yuri and Tatjana to Finland. It is revealed that Scott has two children. Meanwhile, John's older brother, also a preacher, convinces him to force local gang members to leave the teenagers alone.
7	7	"Solo"	Elodie Keene	Alexander Cary & Anthony Swofford	April 10, 2017	4.24
Flashbacks show Scott and Dave training Mills how to withstand torture and escape captivity. In the present, Hart learns that Thomas Vitek, Mejia's weapon supplier, has been spotted in Montreal, Quebec. Mills forces Mejia to reveal Vitek's location, where the Team tails him to a meeting with Jimmy Dunne, a mobster who lost his supremacy to Mejia after his indictments began; and now he wants to reassume control. The Team abducts Vitek, with the latter's operatives giving chase. The Team changes its vehicle; but Mills drives the first vehicle, luring the hostiles away so that the Team can escape with Vitek. Mills is captured and taken to a facility where he is tortured by Vitek's operatives until Dunne's arrive, killing Vitek's men and abducting Mills. Dunne's enforcer tries to convince Mills to talk; but the latter frees himself just as the Team arrives and rescues him. Dunne is captured and delivered to the FBI along with Vitek. The Team blames Mills for separating from the team. Mills meets Asha's family.
8	8	"Leah"	Bill Johnson	Wendy West	April 17, 2017	4.55
Mossad agent Leah Wicker arrives in Washington D.C. to meet Hart, being attacked by a hostile, whom she kills. She tells Hart that Reza Saadon, her contact in the Iranian Quds Force has critical information, but also believing that Saadon ordered the hit on her. The Team arrests Saadon, who denies the accusation; and it is revealed that Wicker is suffering from Alzheimer's disease, having hidden it from Mossad, who she believes will kill her upon learning. Saadon reveals that Quds agents are planning to assassinate the Israeli Prime Minister on his visit to Washington, giving their location. The Team arrests the Quds team, who deny any involvement in the assault on Wicker, proving her theory that Mossad is involved. Wicker confronts Mossad regional director Zev, who unintentionally reveals that he did it alone. Wicker escapes and fakes her death. Meanwhile, Mills learns about Hart's condition. She asks him to keep it hidden. She later develops romance with Harry.
9	9	"Gone"	Romeo Tirone	Jordan Hawley & Joe Loya	April 24, 2017	4.43
The Mexican government learns about Mejia's incarceration and forces the US government to transfer him. Mills learns about the breaches in his home security. The transfer is assigned to the FBI, led by agent Marie Salt, whose husband, George, is kidnapped by Mejia's operatives to force her compliance. Marie secretly meets Mills and reveals the kidnapping, asking him to rescue George. Mills informs the Team, which is divided into two teams, one escorting Mejia and the other assisting Mills in rescuing George, which is successful, leading to a shootout at the exchange point, allowing Mejia to escape. Mills uses a planted tracker to capture Mejia. However, Elena Morales, Mejia's enforcer, kidnaps Asha, forcing Mills to allow Mejia to escape.
10	10	"I Surrender"	Holly Dale	Marjorie David & Mike Daniels	May 1, 2017	4.40
Mills tracks Mejia and Asha to Texas while the Team starts looking for him. Mills attacks Mejia's safehouse, where he passes the border through a tunnel to Mexico, taking Asha; but Morales is killed by Mills, who convinces the Team to help him kill Mejia and rescue Asha. They arrive in Ciudad Juárez, where they go to an FBI black site to get weapons. The Team infiltrates Mejia's mansion and meanwhile, the Mexican Army is approaching. A shootout starts, with Mejia cutting Asha's throat to facilitate his escape. Mills entrusts Asha to John, proceeding to capture Mejia just as Mexican soldiers arrive. Mills kills Mejia before he is shot by the soldiers and captured. Asha survives the wound; the ODNI operation is covered up; and Hart blackmails the FBI director demanding he find Mills, who awakens in a prison.

=== Season 2 (2018) ===
No. overall	No. in season	Title	Directed by	Written by	Original release date	U.S. viewers (millions)
11	1	"S.E.R.E."	Romeo Tirone	Greg Plageman & Tony Camerino	January 12, 2018	2.79
Bryan Mills must fight for his life while inside a secret Mexican prison. His escape plan is derailed when he and a young migrant girl are taken by smugglers.
12	2	"Quarry"	Stephen Kay	Erik Mountain	January 19, 2018	2.98
When a plane carrying Bryan Mills and a key witness in a murder investigation (guest star Alexander Draper) crashes, a wounded Mills must call upon the survival skills his father taught him to overcome the elements, find a way out of the woods and protect the witness from a lethal team of mercenaries on their tail. Meanwhile, Santana organizes a "go big or go home" plan to locate the downed plane.
13	3	"Hammurabi"	Lukas Ettlin	Zak Schwartz	January 26, 2018	3.14
14	4	"OPSEC"	Sarah Pia Anderson	Aaron Carew	February 2, 2018	2.53
15	5	"Absalom"	Romeo Tirone	Erik Mountain	March 2, 2018	2.45
16	6	"Charm School"	Michael Nankin	Karen Wyscarver & Sanford Golden	March 9, 2018	2.23
17	7	"Invitation Only"	T. J. Scott	Andy Callahan	March 16, 2018	3.24
18	8	"Strelochnik"	Elodie Keene	Tony Camerino	March 23, 2018	2.88
19	9	"Verum Nocet"	Eduardo Sánchez	Karen Wyscarver & Sanford Golden	March 30, 2018	2.15
20	10	"All About Eve"	Scott Peters	Brusta Brown & John Mitchell Todd	April 6, 2018	3.01
21	11	"Password"	David Wellington	Andy Callahan	April 13, 2018	3.01
22	12	"Imperium"	M.J. Bassett	Brusta Brown & John Mitchell Todd	May 26, 2018	1.76
23	13	"ACGT"	Bill Johnson	Nicole Demasi	June 2, 2018	2.08
24	14	"Carapace"	Ruba Nadda	Zak Schwartz	June 9, 2018	2.45
25	15	"Render"	Edward Ornelas	Erik Mountain	June 23, 2018	1.75
26	16	"Viceroy"	Chris Fisher	Story by : Greg Plageman; Teleplay by : Greg Plageman & Karen Wyscarver & Sanford Golden	June 30, 2018	1.88

== Reception ==
=== Critical response ===
Review aggregator Rotten Tomatoes gives the series an approval rating of 32% based on 28 reviews, with an average rating of 4.98/10, and says, "Taken's cast hits the right notes, but overall, the series fails to deliver a compelling narrative distinguished from its source material". On Metacritic, the series has a score of 46 out of 100, based on 22 critics, indicating "mixed or average reviews".

=== Ratings ===
==== Overall ====
Viewership and ratings per season of Taken
Season	Timeslot (ET)	Episodes	First aired		Last aired		TV season	Viewership rank	Avg. viewers (millions)
Season	Timeslot (ET)	Episodes	Date	Viewers (millions)	Date	Viewers (millions)	TV season	Viewership rank	Avg. viewers (millions)
1	Monday 10:00 p.m.	10	February 27, 2017	7.45	May 1, 2017	4.40	2016–17	TBD	TBD
2	Friday 9:00 p.m. (1–9); Friday 8:00 p.m. (10–11); Saturday 8:00 p.m. (12–16)	16	January 12, 2018	2.79	June 30, 2018	1.88	2017–18	TBD	TBD

==== Season 1 ====
Viewership and ratings per episode of Taken
No.	Title	Air date	Rating/share (18–49)	Viewers (millions)
1	"Pilot"	February 27, 2017	1.6/6	7.45
2	"Ready"	March 6, 2017	1.2/5	6.09
3	"Off Side"	March 13, 2017	1.2/4	5.73
4	"Mattie G"	March 20, 2017	0.9/3	4.72
5	"A Clockwork Swiss"	March 27, 2017	1.0/4	5.04
6	"Hail Mary"	April 3, 2017	0.8/3	4.67
7	"Solo"	April 10, 2017	0.8/3	4.24
8	"Leah"	April 17, 2017	0.9/3	4.55
9	"Gone"	April 24, 2017	0.8/3	4.43
10	"I Surrender"	May 1, 2017	0.8/3	4.40

==== Season 2 ====
Viewership and ratings per episode of Taken
No.	Title	Air date	Rating/share (18–49)	Viewers (millions)
1	"S.E.R.E."	January 12, 2018	0.5/2	2.79
2	"Quarry"	January 19, 2018	0.5/2	2.98
3	"Hammurabi"	January 26, 2018	0.5/2	3.14
4	"OPSEC"	February 2, 2018	0.4/2	2.53
5	"Absalom"	March 2, 2018	0.5/2	2.45
6	"Charm School"	March 9, 2018	0.4/2	2.23
7	"Invitation Only"	March 16, 2018	0.5/2	3.24
8	"Strelochnik"	March 23, 2018	0.4/2	2.88
9	"Verum Nocet"	March 30, 2018	0.3/1	2.15
10	"All About Eve"	April 6, 2018	0.4/2	3.01
11	"Password"	April 13, 2018	0.4/2	3.01
12	"Imperium"	May 26, 2018	0.2/1	1.76
13	"ACGT"	June 2, 2018	0.2/1	2.08
14	"Carapace"	June 9, 2018	0.4/2	2.44
15	"Render"	June 23, 2018	0.2/1	1.75
16	"Viceroy"	June 30, 2018	0.2/1	1.88
