= Taken 3 =

2014 action film by Olivier Megaton

- Theatrical release poster
- Directed by: Olivier Megaton
- Screenplay by: Luc Besson; Robert Mark Kamen
- Based on: Characters by Luc Besson; Robert Mark Kamen
- Produced by: Luc Besson
- Starring: Liam Neeson; Forest Whitaker; Maggie Grace; Famke Janssen; Dougray Scott
- Cinematography: Eric Kress
- Edited by: Audrey Simonaud; Nicolas Trembasiewicz
- Music by: Nathaniel Méchaly
- Production companies: EuropaCorp; M6 Films; Meñakoz Films
- Distributed by: EuropaCorp Distribution (France)
- Release dates: 16 December 2014 (Berlin); 21 January 2015 (France)
- Running time: 109 minutes
- Country: France
- Languages: English; Russian
- Budget: $48 million
- Box office: $326.4 million

Taken 3 (sometimes stylized as TAK3N) is a 2014 English-language French action-thriller film. It is the third and final film in the Taken trilogy, following Taken (2008) and Taken 2 (2012), starring Liam Neeson as former government operative Bryan Mills. It was directed by Olivier Megaton and written by Luc Besson and Robert Mark Kamen. The cast also includes Forest Whitaker, Maggie Grace, and Famke Janssen. The movie features Mills being falsely accused of murder and consequently being pursued by police inspector Dotzler, while he uses his skill set to prove his innocence and find the real murderer.

On 21 January 2015, EuropaCorp Distribution released Taken 3 in France; critics gave it mostly negative reviews, and it grossed $326.4 million on a $48 million budget.

== Plot ==
Retired CIA officer Bryan Mills visits his daughter, Kim, to deliver an early birthday gift. After an awkward visit, he invites his former wife, Lenore, to dinner. Although she declines, she later shows up at his apartment and tells him about her marital problems, but says she wants to make it work. Later, her husband, Stuart, tells Bryan never to see his wife again.

The next morning, Bryan receives a text from Lenore asking to meet for breakfast. When Bryan returns home, he discovers Lenore dead. Two LAPD officers immediately appear to arrest him, but Bryan subdues them, leads other officers on a chase through the neighborhood, disappears into the sewer system, and escapes. Meanwhile, LAPD Detective Dotzler reviews Bryan's background.

Bryan retreats to a safe house equipped with weapons and surveillance electronics. He retraces Lenore's final movements to a gas station and obtains the surveillance footage showing her being abducted by men, including one with a distinctive hand tattoo. LAPD detectives arrive to arrest him, but Bryan hijacks the police cruiser and downloads phone records from an LAPD database onto a thumb drive. He contacts Kim at Lenore's funeral via a camera hidden in his friend Sam's suit and instructs her to maintain her "very predictable schedule." Bryan arranges to meet with her later and removes a surveillance bug, which Dotzler planted on her. Kim tells Bryan that she is pregnant, and that Stuart is acting scared and has hired bodyguards.

Bryan chases Stuart's car, but a pursuing SUV ambushes him, forcing his car over a cliff. Bryan survives, hijacks another car, and follows the attacking terrorists to a roadside liquor store. Bryan kills the men, then abducts and interrogates Stuart using waterboarding. Stuart confesses that his former business partner and ex-Russian Spetsnaz operator, Oleg Malankov, a mob boss and terrorist leader, murdered Lenore because Stuart owes him money; Stuart exposed Bryan's identity to Malankov out of jealousy.

With assistance from his old colleagues and a nervous Stuart, Bryan gains entry to Malankov's heavily secured penthouse. After Bryan kills Malankov's guards and fights Malankov, a mortally wounded Malankov reveals that Stuart planned Lenore's murder and framed Bryan as part of a business deal to collect a $12,000,000 life insurance policy. Malankov adds that when Stuart failed to kill Bryan, he used Bryan to try to kill Malankov so Stuart could keep the insurance money.

Meanwhile, Stuart abducts Kim and heads to the airport, intending to flee with the money on his private plane. Bryan, rushing through the city in Malankov's Porsche under police pursuit, arrives at the airport just as Stuart's plane is preparing for takeoff. After ramming the plane with the Porsche on the runway, Bryan overpowers Stuart. Heeding Kim's pleas, Bryan refrains from killing Stuart, but warns him to expect retribution if he escapes justice or receives a reduced prison sentence. Dotzler and the LAPD arrive at the scene and arrest Stuart, while Bryan is cleared of all charges.

In the aftermath, Kim tells Bryan she wants to name her child after her mother if it's a girl.

== Cast ==
- Liam Neeson as Bryan Mills
- Forest Whitaker as Inspector Frank Dotzler
- Maggie Grace as Kimberly "Kim" Mills, Bryan and Lennie's daughter
- Famke Janssen as Lenore Mills-St. John, Bryan's former wife who is now married to Stuart
- Dougray Scott as Stuart St. John, Lenore's husband and Kim's stepfather
  - Scott replaces Xander Berkeley from the first film.
- Sam Spruell as Oleg Malankov
- Andrew Howard as Maxim
- Leland Orser as Sam Gilroy, Bryan's former colleague and old friend
- Jon Gries as Mark Casey, Bryan's old friend
- David Warshofsky as Bernie Harris, Bryan's old friend
- Jonny Weston as Jimmy
- Don Harvey as Detective Garcia
- Dylan Bruno as Detective Smith
- Al Sapienza as Detective Johnson

== Production ==
On 28 September 2012, Liam Neeson said that there would not be a third film, or that the chances of Taken 3 happening were minimal. Later, in October 2012, the screenwriters for the first two films told Hollywood that 20th Century Fox and EuropaCorp wanted them to do a third film, but it would go in another direction. As of 24 June 2013, the script was being written, but no director was set. On 12 March 2014, Maggie Grace joined the cast, followed by closing a deal with Famke Janssen the next day. On 24 March 2014, Leland Orser also returned to play his character, as did Jon Gries. On 31 March 2014, Jonny Weston signed on to appear in the film as Kim's boyfriend. Neeson asked for and was paid $20 million for the role; as the film only cost $48 million to make, his pay alone was nearly half the budget. The role of Stuart St John, originally portrayed by Xander Berkeley in the first film, was recast, and that role was played by Dougray Scott in this film.

=== Filming ===
Principal photography of the film began on 29 March 2014 in Los Angeles, as well as in Atlanta. On 24 April 2014, filming began in Covington, Georgia, where they filmed scenes at Newton College & Career Academy over the course of two days.

=== Music ===
Nathaniel Méchaly was set to score the film.

All songs written and composed by Nathaniel Méchaly except where noted.

Taken 3 (Original Motion Picture Soundtrack)
No.	Title	Length
1.	"Taken 3 Opening"	0:35
2.	"Let Me Weep" (Written and performed by Gaelle Mechaly)	2:54
3.	"Toes" (Performed by Glass Animals)	4:17
4.	"Predictable"	1:20
5.	"Lenore Is Dead"	1:41
6.	"Bryan Runs"	2:51
7.	"A Stutter" (Written and performed by Ólafur Arnalds and Arnor Dan)	5:09
8.	"He's Playing You"	1:37
9.	"Bryan's Escape"	4:09
10.	"He Didn't Do It"	2:23
11.	"Inspector Dotzler"	1:18
12.	"College Pursuit"	2:30
13.	"Kim Interrogation"	3:37
14.	"Fourth Yogurt from the Back"	1:27
15.	"Malankov's Penthouse"	2:40
16.	"Up to the Russians"	1:28
17.	"He's a Ghost"	3:03
18.	"Bryan's Grief"	6:13
19.	"Anything Yet?"	2:38
20.	"Store Fight"	2:36
21.	"Porsche Pursuit"	4:20
22.	"Saving Kim"	4:50
23.	"Infinity" (Written and performed by The xx)	5:40
Total length:		1:08:50

== Release ==
A trailer of Taken 3 the film saw its release on 1 January 2015, in Hong Kong and South Korea; on 8 January, the film was released in the UK, in Spain on 16 January, in France on 21 January and on 12 February in Italy.

20th Century Fox released the film on 9 January 2015 in the United States. The film was released under the title of "Taken 3 – L'ora della verità" in Italy, "Búsqueda implacable 3" in Mexico, "V3nganza" in Spain, "96 Hours -- Taken 3" in Germany and "Заложница 3" in Russia.

Taken 3 employed a "somewhat unconventional" marketing strategy with business-focused social network LinkedIn selecting one fan to have their "particular set of LinkedIn skills" endorsed by Liam Neeson's character Mills (a nod to a line in the first Taken, where Mills outlined his "very particular set of skills").

=== Home media ===
20th Century Fox Home Entertainment released Taken 3 on Blu-ray and DVD on 21 April 2015.

=== Streaming ===
The film was added on Disney+ on 24 September 2021.

== Reception ==
=== Box office ===
The film grossed $89.3 million in North America and $236.5 million in other territories for a worldwide gross of $326.4 million, against a budget of $48 million.

In North America, the film earned $14.7 million on its opening day (including previews), which is the fourth-highest opening day for a film released in January behind 2015's American Sniper ($30.5 million), 2008's Cloverfield ($17.16 million) and 2012's The Devil Inside ($16.8 million). It topped the box office in its opening weekend with $39.2 million against a $38 – $39 million projection, making it the second highest debut in the Taken franchise behind Taken 2 ($49 million) and the fourth-highest January opening of all time behind American Sniper ($89.2 million), Ride Along ($41.5 million) and Cloverfield ($40.1 million).

Outside North America, the film opened a week prior to its US debut in South Korea and Hong Kong, and earned $8 million and $1.27 million, respectively, for a total of $9.34 million. In its actual opening weekend outside of North America, the film was #2 behind Night at the Museum: Secret of the Tomb, earning $41 million from 4,730 screens in 36 markets. Highest international openings were witnessed in the UK and Malta ($10.86 million) and Australia ($4.8 million). It also went #1 in Taiwan, Malaysia, Singapore and Thailand. The film opened to first place in the UK with $5.5 million, and debuted in Germany with $4.4 million, Russia with $2.2 million, Philippines with $2.5 million, which is the second-biggest opening ever for 20th Century Fox, and Spain with $1.2 million.

=== Critical response ===
The film was panned by critics, with the criticism directed at the film's action sequences, editing, direction and plot but the acting was praised. On Rotten Tomatoes the film holds a rating of 13%, based on 119 reviews, with an average rating of 3.7/10, becoming the worst-rated film of the trilogy. The site's critical consensus reads, "Hampered by toothless PG-13 action sequences, incoherent direction, and a hackneyed plot, Taken 3 serves as a clear signal that it's well past time to retire this franchise." On Metacritic the film has a score of 26 out of 100, based on 30 critics, indicating "generally unfavorable reviews". Audiences polled by CinemaScore gave the film an average grade of "B+" on an A+ to F scale, the same as its predecessor.

Nicolas Rapold of The New York Times gave the film a negative rating, writing, "The logy screenplay, by Luc Besson and Robert Mark Kamen, sags under head-clutchingly banal dramatic scenes. Only Liam Neeson's appeal somehow survives unscathed, perhaps the most impressive stunt of all." Maggie Lee of Variety also went negative for the film, saying, "The third and presumably final installment of the Liam Neeson action franchise is a mind-numbing, crash-bang misfire". Betsy Sharkey of the Los Angeles Times, giving the film a negative review, writes, "Taken 3 is so unintentionally hilarious I couldn't help but wonder -- do movie contracts carry a humiliation bonus clause these days?" Joe Neumaier of New York Daily News gave the film 0 stars out of 5, saying, "Here it's the audience that gets taken".

Mick LaSalle of the San Francisco Chronicle gave the film a negative review, saying, "If you love the other Taken movies, you will like this. But if you're determined to love it, you'll have to talk yourself into it -- and even then, it might not work." Ignatiy Vishnevetsky of The A.V. Club gave the film a C− grade, stating, "Because Mills' hyper-competence never seems exciting, it instead becomes giggle-inducing." Peter Travers of Rolling Stone gave the film zero stars, commenting, "Be warned, sequel fanboys: This thing sucks! At 62, Neeson still has a glare that means badass. Nothing else makes a damn lick of sense. The only thing getting taken is the audience."

Conversely, the film received a more positive review from Amy Nicholson of LA Weekly, who gave the film a grade of C, saying, "All you need to know about Taken 3 is that Liam Neeson survives an explosive car crash -- twice". Kyle Anderson of Entertainment Weekly also went positive with the review by giving the film a B− grade, commenting, "It's the weakest of the trilogy, but Taken 3 kicks just hard enough to survive another day."

=== Accolades ===
Award	Category	Recipient(s)	Result	Ref.
Teen Choice Awards	Choice Movie Actress: Action	Maggie Grace	Nominated	
People's Choice Awards	Favorite Thriller Movie		Won	
