= Layla Alizada =

Afghan-born Canadian actress (born 1977)

- Born: August 10, 1977 (age 49); Kabul, Afghanistan
- Occupation: Actress
- Years active: 1995–present
- Known for: The Muppets, Jane the Virgin, Days of Our Lives, Shut Eye
- Spouse: Noel Fisher (m. 2017)

Layla Alizada (Dari: لیلا علیزاده; born August 10, 1977) is a Canadian actress, who is best known for appearing in guest roles in some well-known American television shows, including The Muppets and Jane the Virgin, as well as recurring roles in Days of Our Lives and Shut Eye.

== Career ==
Alizada began acting in 1995, at the age of 18, appearing in an episode of Strange Luck ("Hat Trick").

Since her debut, she has been offered many guest star roles in a number of American television series, such as Days of Our Lives, where she portrayed Kelly, and Jane the Virgin, portraying Regina.

She has taken part in several noticeable TV shows, including The Muppets and Jane the Virgin. Alizada played Meena, a refugee from Afghanistan in the television movie, Chasing Freedom (2004). In Chasing Freedom, Alizada's character, who has destroyed her identification to escape the Taliban, is unable to prove she should be granted political asylum. From 2016 to 2017, she had a recurring role as Simza on Shut Eye.

== Personal life ==
Alizada was born in Kabul, Afghanistan; her family relocated to Montreal, Quebec, during her childhood.

Since November 2004, Alizada has been in a relationship with actor Noel Fisher. The couple got engaged in 2014, and were married on July 15, 2017.

== Filmography ==
=== Film ===
Year	Title	Role	Notes
2004	Chasing Freedom	Meena	Television movie
2007	Holiday in Handcuffs	Lucy	Television movie
2011	Compromise	Shalini	
2015	Day One	Feda	Short film
2019	The Cuban	Shireen	

=== Television ===
Year	Title	Role	Notes
1995	Strange Luck	Carol	Episode: "Hat Trick"
2004	Da Vinci's Inquest	Constable Gloria Walker	5 episodes
2006	Da Vinci's City Hall	Susan Watts	Episode: "Bumped from the Ball"
2006	Godiva's	Rajni Haideri	4 episodes
2006	The Evidence	Officer Heiden	Episode: "Stringers"
2006	Eureka	Dr. Sharat	Episode: "Alienated"
2014	Days of Our Lives	Kelly	4 episodes
2015	Muppets	Betty	5 episodes
2015	Rizzoli & Isles	Accountant	Episode: "Deadly Harvest"
2015–2018	Jane the Virgin	Regina	4 episodes
2016	Castle	Phoebe	Episode: "Death Wish"
2016–2017	Shut Eye	Simza	Recurring role
2017	Taken	Elena Morales	4 episodes
2021	Shameless	Detective	Episode: "Cancelled"
2021	Lucifer	Odetta Watson	Episode: "Is this Really How It's Going To End?!"

== See also ==
- Afghan Canadians
