= Robert Mark Kamen =

American screenwriter

- Born: 1947 or 1948 (age 78–79)
- Education: New York University (BA); University of Pennsylvania (PhD)
- Occupation: Screenwriter
- Known for: The Karate Kid; Transporter; Taken

Robert Mark Kamen is an American screenwriter, best known as the creator of The Karate Kid franchise as well as for his later collaborations with French filmmaker Luc Besson, which include the screenplay for The Fifth Element (originally devised by Besson) and the Transporter and Taken franchises. He now produces wine from his vineyards near Sonoma, California.

== Early life and education ==
Kamen grew up in the Bronx in New York City. He graduated from New York University in 1969. He received his Ph.D. in American Studies from the University of Pennsylvania.

== Career ==
Kamen is a frequent collaborator of French writer and director Luc Besson, who co-created The Fifth Element, The Transporter, and the Taken series. The two first worked together on the Natalie Portman and Jean Reno thriller The Professional. After the success of The Fifth Element, Besson invited Kamen to join him in his goal of creating a "mini-studio" in Europe, making "movies that would travel, international movies, you know, action movies."

=== The Karate Kid ===
The Karate Kid is a semi-autobiographical story based on Kamen's life. When Kamen was 17, he was beaten up by a gang of bullies after the 1964 New York World's Fair. He thus began to study martial arts to defend himself. Kamen was unhappy with his first teacher, who taught martial arts as a tool for violence and revenge. He moved on to study Okinawan Gōjū-ryū Karate under a teacher who did not speak English but himself was a student of Chōjun Miyagi.

As a Hollywood screenwriter, Kamen was mentored by Frank Price, who told him that producer Jerry Weintraub had optioned a news article about the young child of a single mother who had earned a black belt to defend himself against neighborhood bullies. Kamen then combined his own life story with the news article and used both to create the screenplay for The Karate Kid.

DC Comics had a character called "Karate Kid." The filmmakers received special permission from DC Comics in 1984 to use the title for the first film (and subsequent sequels).

=== Vineyards ===
In 1980, after being paid $135,000 for his first screenplay (which was never produced), Kamen used the check to buy 280 acres of rocky land on the western slopes of the Mayacamas mountains north of Sonoma in Sonoma County, California. He hired winegrower Phil Coturri to turn 46 acres into a vineyard in 1981. In 1984, the first grapes were sold to local winemakers. Half the vineyard was destroyed in a fire in 1996. Kamen replanted the vineyard, and in 1999, he bottled his first Kamen-branded wine, a Cabernet Sauvignon. In 2002, Kamen hired Mark Herold to craft his wines.

== Filmography ==
Writer

- Taps (1981)
- Split Image (1982)
- The Karate Kid (1984)
- The Karate Kid Part II (1986)
- The Karate Kid Part III (1989)
- Gladiator (1992)
- The Power of One (1992)
- Lethal Weapon 3 (1992)
- A Walk in the Clouds (1995)
- The Fifth Element (1997)
- Kiss of the Dragon (2001)
- The Transporter (2002)
- Transporter 2 (2005)
- Bandidas (2006)
- Taken (2008)
- Transporter 3 (2008)
- The Karate Kid (2010) (Story only)
- Colombiana (2011)
- Taken 2 (2012)
- Taken 3 (2014)
- The Warriors Gate (2016)
- Angel Has Fallen (2019)
- Night Has Fallen (TBA)

Uncredited rewrites

- The Punisher (1989) (Credited as producer)
- Under Siege (1992)
- The Fugitive (1993)
- The Devil's Own (1997)
- The Devil's Advocate (1997)

Special thanks

- Left Luggage (1998)
- Lucy (2014)

Artistic consultant

- Unleashed (2005) (Also creative consultant)
- Brick Mansions (2014)
