= David Warshofsky =

American actor

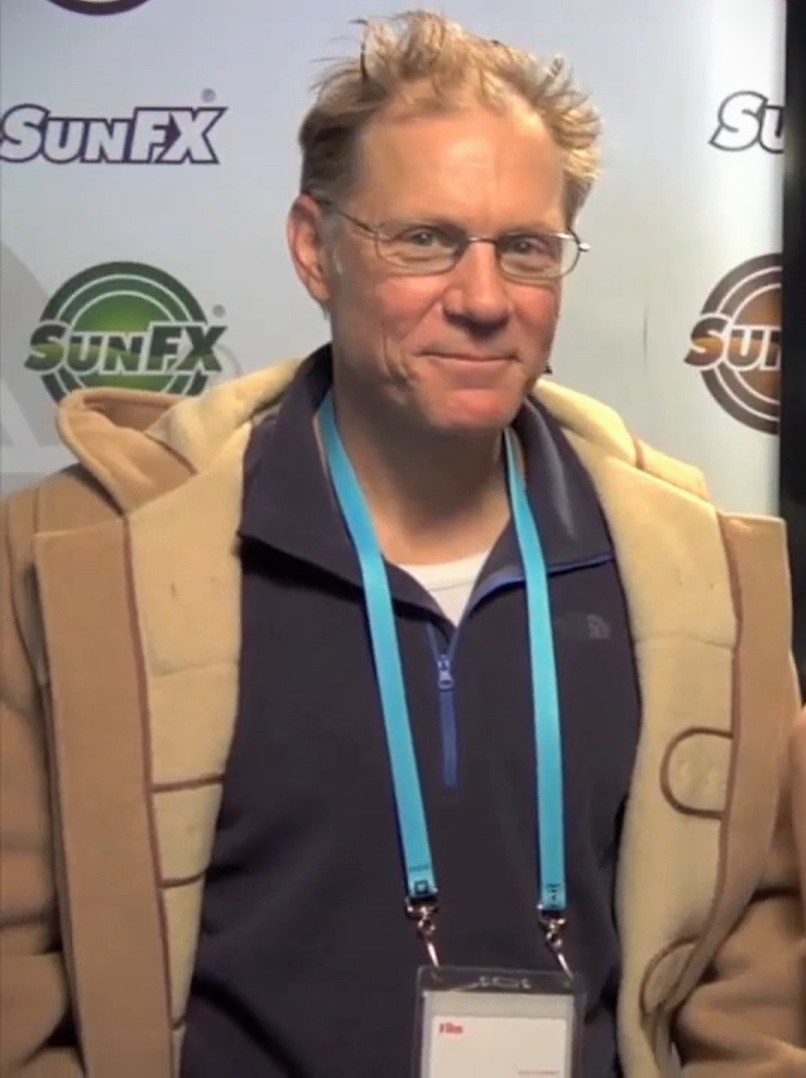
- Warshofsky in 2011
- Born: David A. Warner; February 23, 1961 (age 65); San Francisco, California, U.S.
- Education: Saratoga High School; New York University Tisch School of the Arts
- Occupation: Actor
- Years active: 1984–present

David Warshofsky (born David A. Warner; February 23, 1961) is an American film, television and stage actor.

== Life and career ==
Warshofsky was born David A. Warner in San Francisco, California. He changed his surname back to "Warshofsky", which was his family's original name. Since 1989, Warshofsky has appeared in films and television series, such as episodes of Law & Order, ER, Commander in Chief, Without a Trace, The Mentalist, and Tarzan, and films such as Running Scared, Welcome to Collinwood, The Bone Collector, Face/Off, Taken, Unstoppable, and There Will Be Blood.

Warshofsky is Jewish.

== Filmography ==
=== Film ===
- Last Exit to Brooklyn (1989) – Mike
- Suffering Bastards (1989) – Al Johnson
- Family Business (1989) – Lawyer's Parking Attendant
- Born on the Fourth of July (1989) – Lieutenant – Vietnam
- Skinner (1995) – Geoff Tate
- Face/Off (1997) – Bomb Leader
- G.I. Jane (1997) – Sgt. Johns, Instructor
- The Minus Man (1999) – Detective Pate
- The Bone Collector (1999) – Amelia's Partner
- Endsville (2000) – Doug
- Human Nature (2001) – Police Detective
- Don't Say a Word (2001) – Ryan
- Personal Velocity: Three Portraits (2002) – Kurt Wurtzle
- Welcome to Collinwood (2002) – Sergeant Babitch
- Fight or Flight (2003, short) – Lawerence
- The Best Thief in the World (2004) – Paul Zaidman
- Running Scared (2006) – Lester the Pimp
- The Hunter (2007, short) – Frank
- Cough Drop (2007, short) – Greg Pierson
- There Will Be Blood (2007) – H.M. Tilford
- Taken (2008) – Bernie
- American Violet (2008) – Robert Foster
- Public Enemies (2009) – Warden Baker
- Fair Game (2010) – Pete
- Unstoppable (2010) – Judd Stewart
- The Future (2011) – Marshall
- Little Birds (2011) – Joseph Hoffman
- Small Apartments (2012) – Detective Holman
- The Master (2012) – Philadelphia Police
- Lincoln (2012) – William Hutton
- Now You See Me (2013) – Cowan
- Captain Phillips (2013) – Mike Perry
- The Two Faces of January (2014) – Paul Vittorio
- Taken 3 (2014) – Bernie
- Stockholm, Pennsylvania (2015) – Glen Dargon
- Now You See Me 2 (2016) – Agent Cowan
- Wilson (2017) – Olsen
- Beatriz at Dinner (2017) – Grant
- Feed (2017) – Dr. Rothstein
- It's Not About Jimmy Keene (2019) – Joe
- Blonde (2022) – Darryl F. Zanuck

=== Television ===
- Home Improvement (1991) – Fireman #1
- Afterburn (1992, TV movie) – Tiger
- NYPD Blue (1995) – Bruce Kriege
- JAG (1997) – Blake, USS Cayuga's Executive Officer
- Chicago Hope (1997) – Joseph Bonora
- Cracker (1997) – Bartender
- Brooklyn South (1998) – Barman
- ER (1998)
- A Bright Shining Lie (1998, TV movie) – Terry Pike
- Mondo Picasso (1999) – Captain Tam
- Friends (2000) – Fireman #2
- The Sopranos (2001) – Cop #2
- Law & Order (2001–2007) – Danny Miller, Walter Grimes, Roger Kraslow
- Tarzan (2003) – Sheriff Tim Sweeney (1 episode)
- Without a Trace (2004)
- Commander in Chief (2006) – Frank Terzano
- Scrubs (2006) – Dave Bradford
- Law & Order: Criminal Intent (2006) – Officer Ray Wiznesky
- Walkout (2006, TV movie) – Lloyd Hurley
- Numbers (2007) – Detective Jack Collins
- Generation Kill (2008, TV mini-series) – Battalion Commander
- The Mentalist (2009–2011) – Donny Culpepper
- Law & Order: Special Victims Unit (2012) - Chief Duggan
- Battle Creek (2015) – Agent Bromberg
- Fear the Walking Dead (2016) – George Geary
- Scandal (2017) – Theodore Peus
- Law & Order: True Crime (2017) - District Attorney Ira Reiner
- Snowfall (2019-21) – Wells (2 episodes)
- Barry (2023) – Agent Harris

=== Video games ===
- Medal of Honor: Rising Sun (2003) – (voice, as Dave Warshofsky)
