= Pierre Morel =

French film director and cinematographer (born 1964)

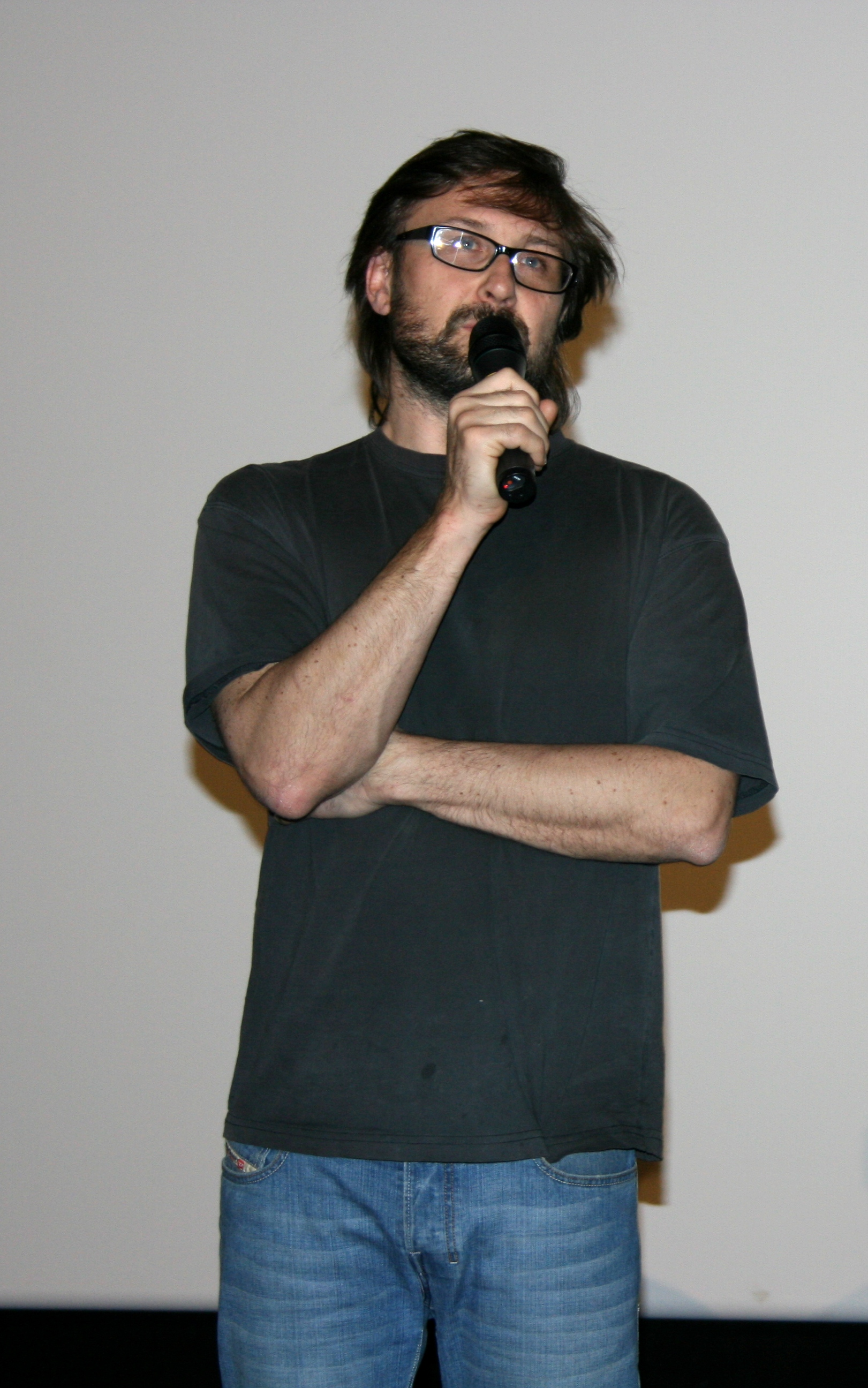
- Morel at the preview showing of Taken in Paris, 27 February 2008
- Born: 12 May 1964 (age 62); France
- Occupations: Film director, cinematographer
- Years active: 1988–present
- Notable work: District 13; Taken; From Paris with Love

Pierre Morel (born 12 May 1964) is a French film director and cinematographer. His work includes District 13, From Paris with Love, and Taken.

== Career ==
After spending his formative years in cinema school, Morel began his career in 2000 as a camera operator on Richard Berry's film L'Art (délicat) de la séduction.

The following year, he began a career as a cinematographer, working with such directors as Louis Leterrier, Corey Yuen, Nancy Meyers, Alek Keshishian, Luc Besson and Phillip Atwell. At the same time, he directed his first film District 13 in 2004, followed by Taken in 2008 and From Paris with Love in 2010. The Daily Telegraph criticised Taken as notable "mainly for its racist stereotyping of Arabs and eastern Europeans."

Morel was attached to Paramount's planned adaptation of Frank Herbert's Dune but left the project before it was cancelled. In 2015, he directed the action film The Gunman, starring Sean Penn, Javier Bardem and Idris Elba.

== Filmography ==
=== Feature films ===
Title	Year	Credited as			Notes	Ref(s)
Title	Year	Director	Cinematographer	Other	Notes	Ref(s)
Race for Glory	1989			Yes	2nd assistant cameraman	
Revenge of the Musketeers	1994			Yes	Steadycam operator	
Un indien dans la ville	1994			Yes	Steadycam operator	
L'Art (délicat) de la séduction	2001			Yes	Cameraman	
Asterix & Obelix: Mission Cleopatra	2002			Yes	Steadycam operator	
The Transporter	2002		Yes	Yes	Cameraman, steadycam operator	
The Truth About Charlie	2002			Yes	Cameraman	
I, Cesar	2003			Yes	Cameraman	
Something's Gotta Give	2003			Yes	Second unit cinematographer	
L'Américain	2004		Yes	Yes	Cameraman, steaycam operator	
District 13	2004	Yes				
Unleashed	2005		Yes			
Love and Other Disasters	2006		Yes			
Taxi 4	2007		Yes			
War	2007		Yes			
Taken	2008	Yes				
From Paris with Love	2010	Yes				
The Gunman	2015	Yes				
Overdrive	2017			Yes	Producer	
Peppermint	2018	Yes				
Al Kameen	2021	Yes				
Freelance	2023	Yes				
Canary Black	2024	Yes				
The Good Samaritan	TBA	Yes				
The New Mrs. Keller	TBA	Yes				
