= Olivier Megaton =

French director, writer, and editor (born 1965)

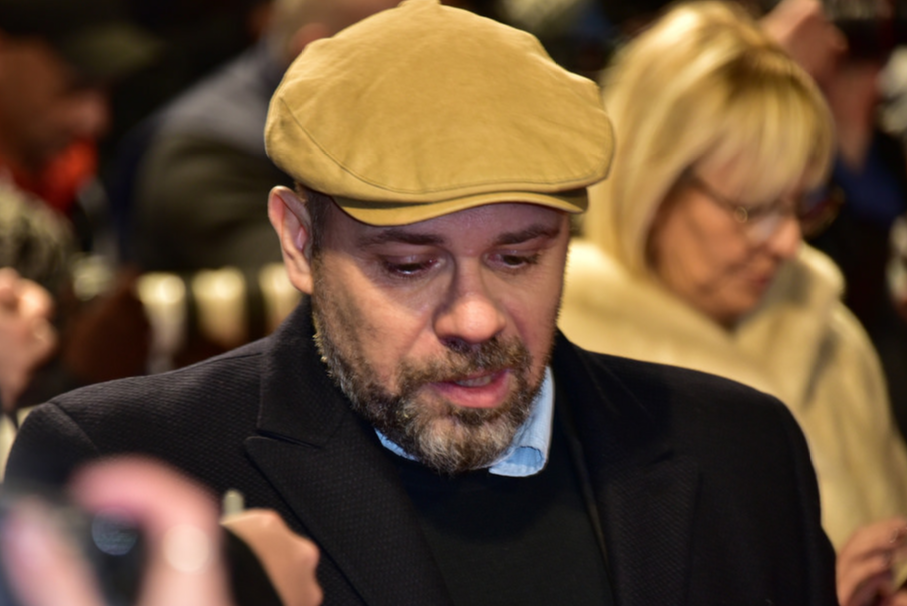
- Olivier Megaton at the Taken 3 Premiere in 2014
- Born: Olivier Fontana; 6 August 1965 (age 61); Paris, France
- Occupations: Director, screenwriter, editor
- Years active: 1996–present

Olivier Megaton (born Olivier Fontana; 6 August 1965) is a French director, writer, and editor who directed the films The Red Siren, Transporter 3, Colombiana, Taken 2 and Taken 3.

== Early life ==
Fontana was born in Paris, 20 years to the day after the atomic bombing of Hiroshima, and his choice of the artistic name Megaton was influenced by this. He grew up in a Paris banlieue, and after qualifying for a diploma in psychology, was active as a graphic artist and also adept in graffiti art. After meeting music video director Jean-Baptiste Mondino, he started working in films. Fontana first started making shorts and video clips before finally directing feature films.

He is of Italian descent.

== Career ==
Megaton's first film was Exit, released in 2000. He next directed The Red Siren, Transporter 3, Taken 2 and Taken 3. He was chosen to direct Mathilda, the sequel to Léon, but expressed the opinion that the film was unlikely to be made. He also served as a second unit director for the film Hitman. His trademark technique in film directing involves intentionally disorienting camerawork and editing.

Aside from filmmaking, Megaton is also a published author after his novel, entitled Le Facteur humain ("The Human Factor"), was released in 1998. In 2021, he returned to film production to release a Netflix documentary entitled Monsters Inside: The 24 Faces of Billy Milligan; the documentary received criticism shortly after release for stigmatizing dissociative identity disorder.

== Filmography ==
=== Feature films ===
Director

- Exit (2000)
- The Red Siren (2002) (Also writer)
- Transporter 3 (2008)
- Colombiana (2011)
- Taken 2 (2012)
- Taken 3 (2014)
- The Last Days of American Crime (2020)

Second unit director

- Hitman (2007)

=== Short films ===
Year	Title	Director	Writer	Notes
1996	Hard Head	Yes	No	
1997	Tout morose	Yes	No	
1998	No Happy End	Yes	Yes	
1998	Je ne veux pas être sage	Yes	Yes	Also editor
2002	Chrysalis	Yes	Yes	Documentary short
2007	Angie	Yes	Yes	

=== Television ===
Year	Title	Director	Writer
1997	One Dance, One Song	Yes	No
1999	Histoires d'objets	Yes	No
1999	Chambre n° 13	Yes	No
2001	Les redoutables	Yes	No
2006	Sable noir	Yes	Yes
2021	Monsters Inside: The 24 Faces of Billy Milligan	Yes	No
