= Taxi (film series) =

French film series

- Created by: Luc Besson
- Original work: Taxi (1998)
- Years: 1998–2018

Films and television
- Film(s): Original series; Taxi (1998); Taxi 2 (2000); Taxi 3 (2003); Taxi 4 (2007); Taxi 5 (2018); Remake; Taxi (2004)
- Television series: Taxi Brooklyn (2014)

Taxi is a series of French action comedy films, created by screenwriter and producer Luc Besson, consisting of five films primarily set in Marseille. In addition, an American-French remake of the 1998 original was made in 2004 and titled Taxi. In 2014 an American-French TV series called Taxi Brooklyn also aired.

== Films ==
Film	Release date	Director(s)	Screenwriter(s)	Producer(s)
Original series
Taxi	April 8, 1998	Gérard Pirès	Luc Besson	Luc Besson, Michèle Pétin & Laurent Pétin
Taxi 2	March 29, 2000	Gérard Krawczyk	Luc Besson	Luc Besson, Michèle Pétin & Laurent Pétin
Taxi 3	January 29, 2003	Gérard Krawczyk	Luc Besson	Luc Besson
Taxi 4	February 14, 2007	Gérard Krawczyk	Luc Besson	Luc Besson, Laurent Pétin & Michèle Pétin
Taxi 5	April 11, 2018	Franck Gastambide	Franck Gastambide, Stéphane Kazandjian & Ahmed Hamidi	Luc Besson
Remake
Taxi	October 6, 2004	Tim Story	Robert Ben Garant, Thomas Lennon & Jim Kouf	Luc Besson

=== Original series ===
==== Taxi (1998) ====
Taxi was shot in 1998 by Gérard Pirès based on the script by Luc Besson. It tells the story of the young taxi driver Daniel, who loves risk and high speeds, and clumsy policeman Émilien who team up to catch a German gang of bank robbers. In the end, thanks to Daniel's ingenuity, they succeed. The movie earned $44.4 million at the box office with a budget of $8.1 million.

==== Taxi 2 (2000) ====
In 2000, director Gérard Krawczyk filmed the sequel. The scriptwriter and producer of the picture was Luc Besson. At the heart of the story lies the confrontation between Daniel and Émilien about the kidnapping of the Japanese minister of defense who arrived in Marseille to get acquainted with France's achievements in the fight against terrorists. The movie earned $64.4 million at the box office with a budget of €10.7 million.

==== Taxi 3 (2003) ====
In 2003 Taxi 3 was released. The director was again Gérard Krawczyk, with Luc Besson still being producer and script writer. Daniel and Émilien reunite once again to fight a gang of bank robbers disguised as Santa Claus. The movie earned $64.5 million at the box office with a budget of €14.5 million.

==== Taxi 4 (2007) ====
On February 14, 2007, the premiere of the film Taxi 4 was held in France. As in the two previous movies, the director was Gerard Krawczyk, and Luc Besson was scriptwriter and producer. The most dangerous criminal in the world, Albert van den Bosch, escapes from the Marseille police station because of Émilien's incapability. As a result of this, Émilien is dismissed and is now working with Daniel and his wife Petra trying to track down and arrest the escaped criminal. The movie raised more than $65 million at the box office with a budget of €17.3 million.

==== Taxi 5 (2018) ====
Taxi 5 premiered in theaters on April 12, 2018. As before, the scriptwriter and producer was Luc Besson, while Gerard Krawczyk was replaced by the young director Franck Gastambide. The characters were also changed, instead of Daniel and Émilien, the heroes of the movie are Daniel's nephew Eddie Makhlouf and the Parisian police officer Silvain Maro, transferred to Marseille. They have to catch a gang of Italian robbers who use Italian supercars as their getaway vehicles. The movie earned $42 million at the box office with a budget of €20.39 million.

=== Remake ===
==== Taxi (2004) ====
The success of the series of films Taxi attracted the attention of Hollywood. In 2004, Luc Besson's studio EuropaCorp and the American 20th Century Fox jointly shot a remake of the first Taxi, keeping the same title.

Belle Williams is the fastest taxi driver of New York and dreams of competing in NASCAR. But instead of racing, she has to team up with police officer Andy Washburn, a dimwitted detective and an inept driver. Together, they pursue a gang of bank robbers led by Vanessa – a cold and prudent beauty.

The film turned out to be financially profitable, grossing nearly $69 million worldwide with a budget of $25 million but received negative reviews on Rotten Tomatoes with a rating of 10%.

=== Future ===
In an interview with “50 Minutes Inside,” Franck Gastambide announced that if Taxi 5 pays off well at the box office, then Taxi 6 will be his next job. Unfortunately, the film failed at the box office with a budget of €20.39 million, raising only $35 million. Despite this, the director still plans to make the sixth film.

In an interview with the Premiere newspaper, Samy Naceri said that he was ready to star in Taxi 6 if Luc Besson “assembled the old team”, he refused to only appear as a cameo.

At the Dinar Film Festival of 2018, Sabrina Ouazani confirmed that the sixth film is still in planning stage, further details are currently unknown.

== Television ==
Series	Season	Episodes	First released	Last released	Showrunner(s)	Network(s)
Taxi Brooklyn	1	12	April 14, 2014	May 12, 2014	Gary Scott Thompson, Stephen Tolkin & Franck Ollivier	TF1, NBC

=== Taxi Brooklyn (2014) ===
In 2014, the television series Taxi Brooklyn, filmed jointly by EuropaCorp Television, the French TV channel TF1 and the American NBC, aired on television. The main creator of the series was Gary Scott Thompson. The plot was based on the first "Taxi".

Caitlin "Cat" Sullivan is an NYPD detective working in Brooklyn. After her driving privileges are suspended, she relies on Leo Romba, a Brooklyn cab driver from France. Leo becomes Cat's driver and a de facto consultant on her cases. While solving crimes with Leo, Cat is also running her own unauthorized investigation into the death of her father, an NYPD detective thought to have been executed by the Capella crime family. In doing so, she clashes with her boss, Captain Baker, and her ex-husband Gregg, who has picked up the case for the FBI.

On the site Rotten Tomatoes, the series received a rating of 38%. On March 6, 2015, NBC cancelled the show.

== Cast and crew ==
=== Principal cast ===
List indicators
- This table shows the characters and the actors who have portrayed them throughout the franchise
- Italics indicate the actor only appears in flashbacks via archive footage from previous films
- A dark grey cell indicates the character was not in the film

Character	Original series					Remake	Television series
Character	Taxi	Taxi 2	Taxi 3	Taxi 4	Taxi 5	Taxi	Taxi Brooklyn
Character	1998	2000	2003	2007	2018	2004	2014
Daniel Morales	Samy Naceri	Samy Naceri	Samy Naceri	Samy Naceri	Mentioned		
Émilien Coutant-Kerbalec	Frédéric Diefenthal	Frédéric Diefenthal	Frédéric Diefenthal	Frédéric Diefenthal	Mentioned		
Lilly Bertineau	Marion Cotillard	Marion Cotillard	Marion Cotillard	Mentioned			
Petra	Emma Wiklund	Emma Wiklund	Emma Wiklund	Emma Wiklund			
Commissaire Gérard Gibert	Bernard Farcy	Bernard Farcy	Bernard Farcy	Bernard Farcy	Bernard Farcy		
Alain Trésor	Édouard Montoute	Édouard Montoute	Édouard Montoute	Édouard Montoute	Édouard Montoute		
General Edmond Bertineau		Jean-Christophe Bouvet	Jean-Christophe Bouvet	Jean-Christophe Bouvet	Mentioned		
Sylvain Marot					Franck Gastambide		
Eddy Maklouf					Malik Bentalha		
Samia					Sabrina Ouazani		
Sandy					Sand Van Roy		
Isabelle "Belle" Precious Williams						Queen Latifah	
Detective Andrew Washburn						Jimmy Fallon	
Vanessa						Gisele Bündchen	
Jesse						Henry Simmons	
Lieutenant Marta Robbins						Jennifer Esposito	
Detective Caitlin Mary Darcy "Cat" Sullivan							Chyler Leigh
Leo Romba							Jacky Ido
Captain John Baker							James Colby
Detective Eddie Esposito							José Zúñiga
Dr. Monica Pena							Jennifer Esposito
Special Agent Gregg James							Bill Heck
Frankie Sullivan							Ally Walker
Ronnie							Raul Casso

=== Additional crew ===
Title	Taxi	Taxi 2	Taxi 3	Taxi 4	Taxi 5
Director	Gérard Pirès	Gérard Krawczyk			Franck Gastambide
Screenplay	Luc Besson				Franck Gastambide; Stéphane Kazandjian; Luc Besson
Editing	Véronique Lange	Thierry Hosse	Yann Herve	Kristin Luca Navarro; Friederic Toraval	Julien Rey
Producer	Luc Besson				
Producer	Michèle Pétin				
Producer	Laurent Pétin				
Music	Akhenaton	Al Kemya	Kore & Skalp	Tefa, Masta; Weallstar—Da. Octopusss	Kore
Cinematographer	Jean-Pierre Sauveur	Gerard Sterin		Pierre Morel	Vincent Richard
Premiere (France)	8 April 1998	29 March 2000	29 January 2003	10 February 2007 (Marseille); 15 February 2007 (rest of France)	7 April 2018 (Marseille); 11 April 2018 (rest of France)
Runtime	90 minutes	88 minutes	87 minutes	97 minutes	102 minutes
Budget	€8.1 mln	€10.7 mln	€14.49 mln	€17.3 mln	€20.39 mln
Genre	Comedy Action				
Country	France				
Company
Company	ARP Sélection				
Company	TF1 Films Production				
Company	StudioCanal			Apipoulaï	
Company	Leeloo Productions		EuropaCorp		
Distributor France	ARP Sélection		EuropaCorp Distribution		

== Reception ==
=== Box office performance ===
	Film					All films of the Taxi (film series)
	Taxi	Taxi 2	Taxi 3	Taxi 4	Taxi 5	All films of the Taxi (film series)
France	$37,980,000	$63,704,000	$35,752,480	$33,342,703	$21,899,085	$192,678,268
United States	$268,254	$729,844	$497,208	—	—	$1,495,306
Worldwide	$44,218,015	$64,433,844	$64,497,208	$65,114,802	$64,497,208	$302,761,077

== Music ==
=== Soundtracks ===
- Taxi: Original Motion Picture Soundtrack 1998
- Taxi 2: Original Motion Picture Soundtrack 2000
- Taxi 3: Original Motion Picture Soundtrack 2003
- Taxi: Original Motion Picture Soundtrack 2004
- Taxi 4: Original Motion Picture Soundtrack 2007
- Taxi 5: Original Motion Picture Soundtrack 2018

== Video games ==
- Taxi 2 – Based on Taxi 2. Released in 2000.
- Taxi 3 – Based on Taxi 3. Released in 2003.
