= Édouard Montoute =

French actor (born 1970)

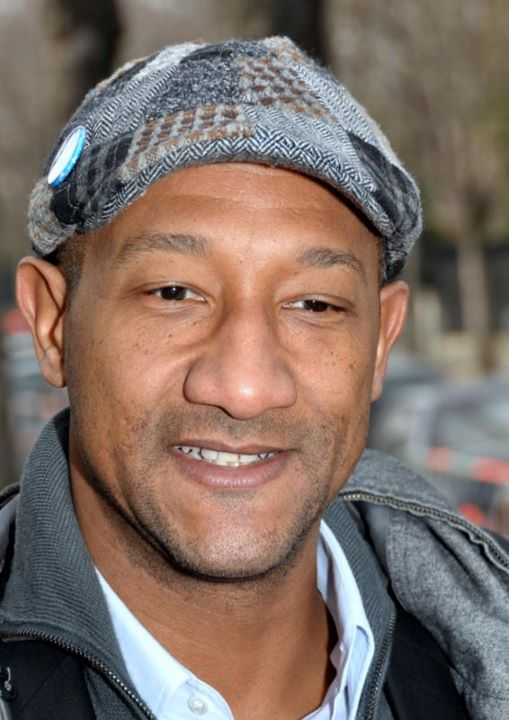
- Montoute in 2012
- Born: 20 December 1970 (age 55); Cayenne, French Guiana
- Citizenship: France
- Occupation: Actor
- Years active: 1990–present

Édouard Montoute (French pronunciation: [edwaʁ mɔ̃tut]; born 20 December 1970) is a French actor. He is best known for his role as Alain Trésor in the film series Taxi Created by Luc Besson.

== Early life and career ==
Having arrived in Houilles, a suburb of Paris, with his family at a very young age, Montoute was drawn to acting. As a teenager, he was admitted to the free class at the Cours Florent. His career began in 1990 in Jean Galmot, aventurier, which takes place specifically in French Guiana, his native region. Young filmmakers called upon him (Olivier Assayas, Xavier Durringer, Mathieu Kassovitz), but he achieved popularity when he accepted a role in the series Goal in 1992. There, he met Frédéric Diefenthal, an actor he would accompany from the Taxi film series to the television series David Nolande.

He notably distinguished himself in comedy, such as Asterix & Obelix: Mission Cleopatra, in "gang films" like La voie est libre by Stéphane Clavier, Nos amis les flics by Bob Swaim, Avant qu'il ne soit trop tard by Laurent Dussaux, or even ensemble comedies such as Les gens en maillot de bain ne sont pas (forcément) superficiels by Éric Assous, and Fracassés by Franck Llopis. He also proved comfortable in more dramatic roles: Femme Fatale by Brian De Palma, The Red Siren by Olivier Megaton, and Dédales by René Manzor.

== Commitments ==
In November 2024, Montoute took part in the Les Pics d'Or ceremony, organized by the Abbé-Pierre Foundation for Housing the Disadvantaged, to ironically denounce street furniture designed to deter the homeless.

== Filmography ==
=== Film ===
- 1990: Jean Galmot, aventurier by Alain Maline
- 1991: Paris Awakens by Olivier Assayas: un dealer
- 1995: La Haine by Mathieu Kassovitz: Darty
- 1995: Fast by Dante Desarthe: Daniel
- 1997: Port Djema by Éric Heumann: Ousman
- 1997: Mauvais Genre by Laurent Bénégui: François
- 1997: Bouge ! by Jérôme Cornuau: Soso
- 1997: J'irai au paradis car l'enfer est ici by Xavier Durringer: Pascal
- 1998: Taxi by Gérard Pirès: Alain
- 1998: La voie est libre by Stéphane Clavier: Yves
- 1999: Le Sourire du clown by Éric Besnard: Alex
- 1999: Du bleu jusqu'en Amérique by Sarah Lévy : Hamid
- 2000: Taxi 2 by Gérard Krawczyk: Alain
- 2000: Cours toujours by Dante Desarthe: Hervé
- 2000: Antilles sur Seine by Pascal Légitimus: Freddy
- 2001: Les gens en maillot de bain ne sont pas (forcément) superficiels by Éric Assous: Lulu
- 2002: Femme fatale by Brian De Palma: Racine
- 2002: Astérix et Obélix: Mission Cléopâtre by Alain Chabat: Nexusis
- 2002: La Sirène rouge by Olivier Megaton: Oliveira
- 2003: Taxi 3 by Gérard Krawczyk: Alain
- 2003: Dédales by René Manzor: Ray
- 2004: Nos amis les flics by Bob Swaim: Kiki
- 2005: Dans tes rêves by Denis Thybaud: Keuj
- 2005: Avant qu'il ne soit trop tard by Laurent Dussaux: Gérard
- 2006: Enfermés dehors by Albert Dupontel: le chauffeur de bus
- 2007: Fracassés by Franck Llopis: Jean-Paul
- 2007: Taxi 4 by Gérard Krawczyk: Alain
- 2008: Jamais 2 sans 3 by Eric Summer: Étienne Garreau
- 2008: La Première Étoile by Lucien Jean-Baptiste: Jojo
- 2009: Trésor by Claude Berri et François Dupeyron
- 2010: Les Petits Mouchoirs by Guillaume Canet: l'ami de Ludo au Baron
- 2012: 30° Couleur by Lucien Jean-Baptiste: Zamba
- 2016: Dieumerci ! by Lucien Jean-Baptiste: The Chief
- 2018: Taxi 5 by : Alain

=== Short films ===
- 1993: Zone bleue de Catherine Morlat
- 1995: Petit matin sanglant de Julien Corain
- 1997: À fond la caisse de Vincent Rivier: le braqueur
- 2000: Mortels by Samuel Jouy: Eddy
- 2002: Alex & Bladas by Marc Barrat, Série de 5 courts-métrages de fiction (6') contre le sida en Guyane, commandités par le Ministère de la santé: Alex
- 2005: Convivium de Michaël Nakache: Hugo

=== Television ===
- 1991: Navarro de Nicolas Ribowski (episode Les chasse-neige): Soulimane
- 1992: Momo by Jean-Louis Bertuccelli: Koffi
- 1992: Goal: Keita
- 1994: 3000 scénarios contre un virus by Xavier Durringer (episode Le flic)
- 1994: Mort d'un gardien de la paix by Josée Dayan
- 1994: Novacek by Marco Pico (episode Le Croisé de l'Ordre)
- 1995: Police des polices by Michel Boisrond (episode L'Ilotier)
- 1995: Navarro de Nicolas Ribowski (episode Le choix de Navarro)
- 1999: Chambre n° 13 by Sarah Lévy (episode Coccinelle)
- 2000: Les Redoutables by Sarah Lévy (episode Prime Time)
- 2000: Mary Lester de Christiane Leherissey (episode Maéna)
- 2001: Accro de Olivier Pancho
- 2002: Duelles de Laurence Katrian (episode Trahisons)
- 2002: Carnets d'ado – Les paradis de Laura de Olivier Panchot
- 2002: Sang d'encre by Didier Le Pêcheur
- 2004: Central Nuit de Franck Vestiel (episode Vol à la Poussette)
- 2004: Un petit garçon silencieux by Sarah Lévy
- 2004: Les amants du bagne by Thierry Binisti
- 2005: Léa Parker by Robin Davis (episode Combat Clandestin)
- 2006: Alice et Charlie (1^{er} episod) de Stéphane Clavier
- 2006: Au crépuscule des temps by Sarah Lévy
- 2006: David Nolande by Nicolas Cuche
- 2007: Alice et Charlie (2^{e} episod) de Julien Seri
- 2008: Flics (serial) de Olivier Marchal: Alex Baros
- 2008: Scalp by Xavier Durringer (serial): Ziggy
- 2009–2011: Les Toqués (serial) de Patrick Malakian: Martin Soléno
- 2009: Jamais deux sans trois (téléfilm) de Eric Summer: Etienne Garreau
- 2009: Facteur chance (téléfilm) de Julien Seri: Miko
- 2009: Les Amants de l'ombre (téléfilm) de Philippe Niang: Sidney Jackson
- 2009: Lady Bar 2 (téléfilm) de Xavier Durringer : Aimé
- 2010: Le Pot de colle (téléfilm) de Julien Seri: Jean-Bernard Hollier
- 2010: Les Edelweiss (serial)de Stéphane Kappes: Bernard
- 2012: Des soucis et des hommes (serial) de Christophe Barraud: Hervé Le Bihan
- 2013: La Croisière (serie) de Pascal Lahmani, avec Lola Dewaere, Anne-Élisabeth Blateau et Christophe Malavoy
- 2013: La Source (serie) de Xavier Durringer
- 2014: Caïn (2 episodes) de Bertrand Arthuys
