= Taxi (1998 film) =

1998 French film by Gérard Pirès

- Theatrical release poster
- Directed by: Gérard Pirès
- Written by: Luc Besson
- Produced by: Luc Besson; Michele Petin; Laurent Petin
- Starring: Samy Naceri; Frédéric Diefenthal; Marion Cotillard; Manuela Gourary; Emma Sjöberg; Bernard Farcy
- Cinematography: Jean-Pierre Sauvaire
- Edited by: Véronique Lange
- Music by: Akhenaton
- Production companies: ARP; TF1 Films Productions; Le Studio Canal+; Cofimage 9; Studio Image 4
- Distributed by: ARP Sélection
- Release date: 10 April 1998
- Running time: 90 minutes
- Country: France
- Language: French
- Budget: $8.7 million
- Box office: $44.5 million

Taxi (French: Taxi) is a 1998 French action comedy film starring Samy Naceri, Frédéric Diefenthal and Marion Cotillard, written by Luc Besson and directed by Gérard Pirès. The film follows a talented driver working a taxi in Marseille, who reluctantly must help a bumbling police inspector catch a gang of professional bank robbers.

It is the first installment in the Taxi film series, which has four sequels: Taxi 2 (2000), Taxi 3 (2003), Taxi 4 (2007), and Taxi 5 (2018).

== Plot ==
Daniel Morales is a highly talented but reckless driver living in Marseille, France, and is in a loving relationship with his girlfriend Lilly. Leaving his job as a delivery man at local pizza parlor "Pizza Joe," he becomes a taxi driver. He drives a white 1997 Peugeot 406, customized with various concealed racing modifications.

Young bumbling police inspector Émilien Coutant-Kerbalec lives with his widowed mother, and has just failed his 8th driver's test. No one takes him seriously at work, including police sergeant Petra, his unrequited crush. Commissioner Gibert briefs the officers on a German gang behind a series of high-profile robberies throughout Europe, who has now arrived in Marseille. The gang is known for their efficiency, skilled driving, and their use of red Mercedes-Benz 500E cars as getaway vehicles. Anticipating the gang's next move, Gibert places police officers around the targeted bank. After the robbers enter the bank, Émilien accidentally causes a multi-vehicle collision and a gun fight with the French Minister's escort convoy, allowing the robbers to escape.

The next day, Émilien decides to take a taxi to work and rides with Daniel. Not knowing his fare's occupation, Daniel shows off his car and breaks several traffic laws. Émilien detains Daniel, but then asks for his help with catching the German gang in exchange for returning Daniel's license, desperate for respect and Petra's attention. Looking at photos of the getaway cars, Daniel concludes that the tires come from a garage owned by Kruger, the only German mechanic in town. Staking out the garage, they spot the German robbers. Émilien tries to interrogate Kruger, who opens fire at the duo and escapes.

The police locate the gang's next target and manage to attach a tracking device to one of the cars. However, the gang stops at a secluded garage and repaints the cars silver, inadvertently sabotaging the tracking device and allowing them to escape again. Émilien then learns that he had left the stove on at his flat and burned it down, forcing him and his mother to stay at Daniel's place. Eager to get rid of Émilien, Daniel correctly deduces the gang's repaint strategy, and through a friend, he tracks the robbers to a racetrack. Daniel provokes the gang into a race and wins, later inspiring Émilien to approach Petra romantically. The duo then become friends, and devise a plan to finally catch the gang red-handed.

The next day, having duplicated the control keys to twenty traffic lights throughout the city, Émilien provides Daniel with a closed radio line. Daniel recruits his old co-workers from Pizza Joe, to whom Émilien distributes the keys and walkie-talkies. After the gang drives away from another robbery, Daniel follows them and successfully taunts the Germans into another race. As the delivery men use the traffic lights to clear a path for the cars, the cars drive onto the freeway. Daniel then speeds towards a bridge that is under construction, and slams on the brake; the gang's cars jump over the gap and lands on the other side, only to discover that they are trapped on an incomplete bridge section.

After the gang is arrested, Daniel and Émilien are given medals by the police commissioner, and Émilien begins dating Petra. The film ends with Daniel competing at the French Grand Prix in a Formula 3000, sponsored by (to Daniel's dismay) the Marseille Police.

== Cast ==
- Samy Naceri as Daniel Morales
- Frédéric Diefenthal as Émilien Coutant-Kerbalec
- Marion Cotillard as Lilly Bertineau
- Emma Sjöberg as Petra
- Richard Sammel as German gang chief
- Bernard Farcy as Commissaire Gérard Gibert
- Édouard Montoute as Alain Trésor
- Tara Römer as Émilien's colleague
- Niels Dubost as Karl, second German thief
- Frank Libert as third German thief
- Stephan Crisz as fourth German thief
- Manuela Gourary as Camille Coutant-Kerbalec
- Georges Neri as Joe
- Dan Herzberg as Paulo
- Sébastien Pons as Akim
- Malek Béchar as Marco
- Guy Quang as pizza deliverer
- Maurice Murcia as retired taxi driver
- Sabine Bail as prefecture employee
- Sébastien Thiery as driving license examiner
- Éric Bérenger as butcher
- Philippe du Janerand as customer in a rush
- Christophe Fesquet as first cop
- Gérard Vantaggioli as second cop
- Christian Mazucchini as police elite driver
- Guillaume Lanson as redneck sniper
- Gérard Dubouche as Gibert's driver
- Ludovic Lavaissière as pizzaiolo

=== Notable stunt drivers ===
- Philippe Alliot, former Formula One racer, from 1984 through 1994
- Patrick Bernaud
- Jean-Pierre Jabouille, former Formula One racer, from 1974 through 1981
- Jean-Pierre Jarier, former Formula One racer, from 1971 through 1983
- Jutta Kleinschmidt, former rally racer and the only woman racer to win the Dakar Rally
- Henri Pescarolo, Formula One racer (1968–1976), 33 times driver and 4-fold winner in the 24 Hours of Le Mans
- Jean Ragnotti, French rally racer from 1973 through 1995

== Production ==
Luc Besson came up with the idea for the movie in 1996, but he was too busy with The Fifth Element to direct it at the time, so he decided to simply produce it. He presented his idea to his usual production company, Gaumont, but Gaumont had no trust in the project and turned Besson down. Besson went to two old friends, Michèle and Laurent Pétin, who headed the small production company ARP. They came to an agreement on a 50/50 split, and Besson began searching for a director. He knew Gérard Pirès from long ago, but Pirès hadn't directed a film in 15 years. He had been directing commercials including ones for Peugeot, which made him a good fit for the project. For budgetary reasons, the location was chosen as Marseille and the actors were relative unknowns at the time. Better known actors were approached, but they turned the project down. The young unknown actors were explained to financiers such as Canal+ as being easier to identify with for a young audience and also being a bet on the future. The main music theme is based on Misirlou, a popular song of Eastern Mediterranean origin.

== Reception ==
=== Box office ===
In terms of box office admissions, the Taxi series is one of the most successful French franchises ever. The first film was the fourth most successful film in France for the year with 6.4 million admissions and a gross of $39.3 million. It had 2.2 million admissions abroad. The film also had very good TV ratings with 12 million viewers on TF1.

=== Critical response ===
Almar Haflidason, reviewing the film for BBC, gave it three stars out of five, describing that there was "fun to be had from this film when it's in motion, but the script is a real blow out." In a research article for the journal French Cultural Studies, Ipek A. Celik Rappas from Koç University describes how the Taxi series "reflects the move in Luc Besson’s career from director to producer of big-budget films, and reveals how his relationship with post-industrial spaces changes as his film locations turn into film-related investments."

== Franchise ==
=== Sequel ===
A sequel titled Taxi 2, was released in 2000.

=== Remake ===
An American remake, also titled Taxi, starring Queen Latifah, Jimmy Fallon, and Gisele Bündchen, was released in October 2004, and was panned by critics.

=== Television series ===
A remake of the original film as a summer series, known as Taxi Brooklyn, aired in August 2014 on NBC.
