= Bernard Farcy =

French actor (born 1949)

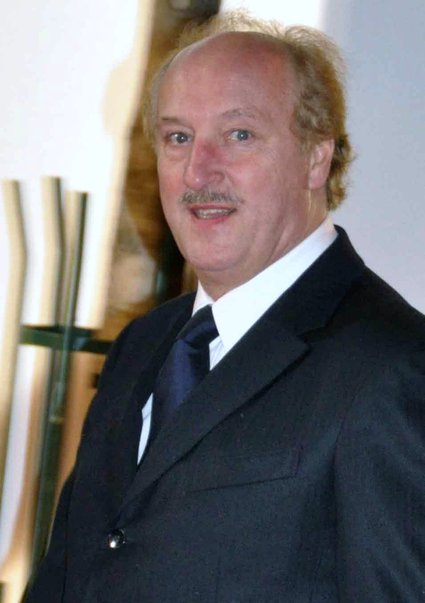
- Farcy at the 35th César Awards, 2010
- Born: 17 March 1949 (age 77); Lyon, France
- Occupation: Actor
- Years active: 1976–present

Bernard Farcy (French pronunciation: [bɛʁnaʁ faʁsi]; born 17 March 1949) is a French actor who has starred in over 70 plays, television series and films.

He is best known for his role as Commissaire Gérard Gibert in Luc Besson's action-comedy franchise Taxi, as well as his appearances in national box-office successes such as Marche à l'ombre (1984), The Three Brothers (1995), Brotherhood of the Wolf (2001), and Asterix & Obelix: Mission Cleopatra (2002), the latter of which has attained cult status in France.

Farcy's performances in more somber movies have also been noted — to the likes of Our Story (1984), Le Solitaire (1987), and Let Sleeping Cops Lie (1988). His interpretation of statesman Charles de Gaulle in the 2006 TV mini-series Le Grand Charles earned him a nomination for the International Emmy Award for Best Actor.

== Theatre ==
Year	Title	Author	Director
1973	How Mister Mockinpott was Cured of His Sufferings	Peter Weiss	Bruno Carlucci
1974	Drums in the Night	Bertolt Brecht	Bruno Carlucci
1979	Ruy Blas	Victor Hugo	Jacques Destoop
1980	The Man with the Flower in His Mouth	Luigi Pirandello	Maiotte Day
1980	Poivre de Cayenne	René de Obaldia	Maiotte Day
1998–1999	Funny Money	Ray Cooney	Éric Civanyan
2008–2009	Oscar	Claude Magnier	Philippe Hersen
2010–2011	The Odd Couple	Neil Simon	Anne Bourgeois

== Filmography ==
Year	Title	Role	Director	Notes
1976	Un type comme moi ne devrait jamais mourir	The hustler	Michel Vianey	
1979	Joséphine ou la comédie des ambitions		Robert Mazoyer	TV mini-series
1982	Le point d'eau		Valérie Moncorgé	Short
1983	Moon in the Gutter	Jesus	Jean-Jacques Beineix	
1983	Capitaine X		Bruno Gantillon	TV mini-series
1984	Our Story	Farid	Bertrand Blier	
1984	Marche à l'ombre	Monsieur Christian	Michel Blanc	
1984	Femmes de personne	Bruno	Christopher Frank	
1985	Urgence		Gilles Béhat	
1985	Les colonnes du ciel	Darbonnay	Gabriel Axel	TV mini-series
1985	Série noire	Chicotte	Jacques Ertaud	TV series (1 episode)
1985	Les enquêtes du commissaire Maigret	Pierre Delteil	Jean Brard	TV series (1 episode)
1985	Néo Polar	Man in Black	Gérard Marx	TV series (1 episode)
1986	Tenue de soirée		Bertrand Blier	
1986	Lien de parenté	Lucien Donati	Willy Rameau	TV movie
1986	Et demain viendra le jour	Sergeant	Jean-Louis Lorenzi	TV movie
1987	Le Solitaire	Brother Carmoni	Jacques Deray	
1987	Coeurs croisés	Fano	Stéphanie de Mareuil	
1987	François Villon - Poetul vagabond		Sergiu Nicolaescu	
1987	Série noire	Prat	Marcel Bluwal	TV series (1 episode)
1988	Let Sleeping Cops Lie	Inspector Latueva	José Pinheiro	
1988	Saxo	Moska	Ariel Zeitoun	
1988	La travestie	The Deutchman	Yves Boisset	
1988	Accord parfait	The Admiral	Arsène Floquet	
1988	A Soldier's Tale	André	Larry Parr	
1989	À deux minutes près	Henri	Eric Le Hung	
1989	La comtesse de Charny	Georges Danton	Marion Sarraut	TV mini-series
1992	Walking a Tightrope	Policeman	Nikos Papatakis	
1992	Vacances au purgatoire		Marc Simenon	TV movie
1993	Justinien Trouvé, ou le bâtard de Dieu	Biensobre	Christian Fechner	
1994	Dead Tired	The ANPE employee	Michel Blanc	
1994	Coeur à prendre		Christian Faure	TV movie
1995	The Three Brothers	Monsieur Steven	Didier Bourdon & Bernard Campan	
1995	Le parasite	The chemist	Patrick Dewolf	TV movie
1995	Van Loc : un grand flic de Marseille	Bessières	Claude Barrois	TV series (1 episode)
1996	The Liars		Élie Chouraqui	
1996	Les boeuf-carottes	Milandre	Peter Kassovitz	TV series (1 episode)
1997	Les Soeurs Soleil	Norbert	Jeannot Szwarc	
1997	La divine poursuite	Walter Rousseau	Michel Deville	
1998	Taxi	Commissioner Gérard Gibert	Gérard Pirès	
1998	Crimes en série	Célano	Patrick Dewolf	TV series (1 episode)
1998	Vertiges	Vasco	Gérard Cuq	TV series (1 episode)
1999	L'appel de la cave	The Friend	Mathieu Mercier	Short
1999	Chère Marianne	Jean-Claude Vilard	Pierre Joassin	TV series (1 episode)
2000	Taxi 2	Commissioner Gérard Gibert	Gérard Krawczyk	
2000	Le Mystère Parasuram	Hibert Dupire	Michel Sibra	TV movie
2001	Brotherhood of the Wolf	Pièrre-Jean Laffont	Christophe Gans	
2002	Asterix & Obelix: Mission Cleopatra	Redbeard	Alain Chabat	
2002	Les percutés	Karszinski	Gérard Cuq	
2003	Taxi 3	Commissioner Gérard Gibert	Gérard Krawczyk	
2004	People	B.B. Bellencourt	Fabien Onteniente	
2004	Albert est méchant	Lechevalier	Hervé Palud	
2004	Il était une fois dans l'Ouest... de la Corse	Provost Stetson	Laurent Simonpoli	Short
2004	Mona lisier	Christian	Clode Hingant	Short
2004	Le plein des sens	The Man	Erick Chabot	Short
2005	Iznogoud	Pullmankar	Patrick Braoudé	
2006	Le bénévole	Commissioner Trépied	Jean-Pierre Mocky	
2006	Le Grand Charles	Charles de Gaulle	Bernard Stora	TV mini-series Biarritz International Festival of Audiovisual Programming, Actor; Nominated, International Emmy Award for Best Actor
2007	Taxi 4	Commissioner Gérard Gibert	Gérard Krawczyk	
2009	The Villain	Inspector Elliot	Albert Dupontel	
2011	À la recherche du temps perdu	Duke of Guermantes	Nina Companeez	TV mini-series
2013	Nos chers voisins	Jean-Claude	Emmanuel Rigaut	TV series (1 episode)
2016	La folle histoire de Max et Léon	Célestin	Jonathan Barré	
2018	Taxi 5	Mayor Gérard Gibert	Franck Gastambide	
2019	Monstrus Circus	Lucius	Jordan Inconstant	Short
2023	L'Hypermnésique	Jo Beaumont	Julien Mouquet	Short
