= Samy Naceri =

French actor (born 1961)

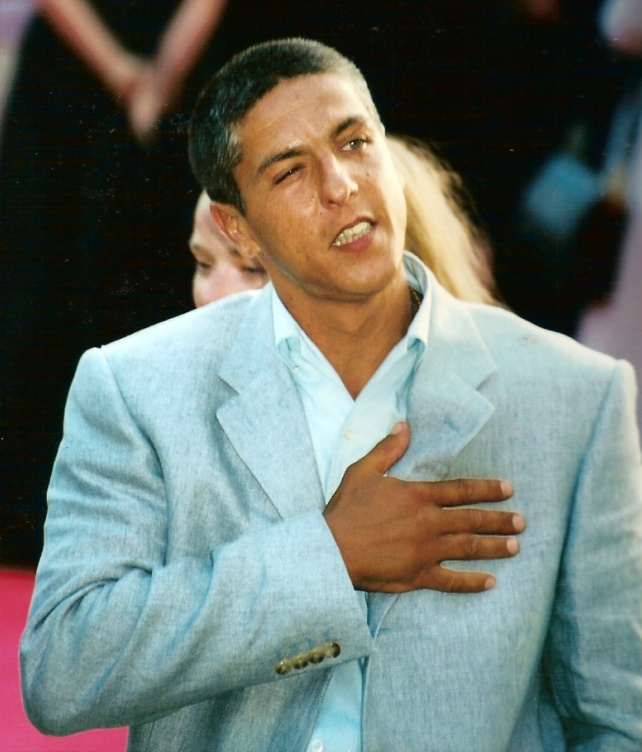
- Naceri at the 2000 Cannes Film Festival
- Born: Saïd Naceri; 2 July 1961 (age 64); Paris, France
- Occupation: Actor
- Years active: 1989–present
- Children: 1

Saïd Naceri (Arabic: سعيد ناصري; born 2 July 1961), known as Samy Naceri (French: [sami naseʁi]), is a French actor known for his work in the four Taxi films and The Code (La Mentale).

== Early life and career ==
Naceri was born to an Algerian Berber Kabyle father and a French mother in the 4th arrondissement of Paris and spent his childhood in the Parisian suburb of Fontenay-sous-Bois. His brother is Bibi Naceri, who co-wrote and co-starred in international hit film District 13. He shared the award for Best Actor for his role in the film Days of Glory at the 2006 Cannes Film Festival.

He grew up in the suburb of Paris, at Fontenay-sous-Bois. He has a son, Julian, born in 1994.

In 2024 he revealed to the public his relationship with Sofia Athéna, a young actress born in 1994.

== Legal issues ==
Stemming from a substance abuse charge in 2003, Naceri was sentenced to eight months' imprisonment with deferment, had his driving licence suspended for three years, and was penalized with a €5,000 fine for a road rage incident in which he smashed a car and assaulted one of its occupants.

In November 2005, after waiting for a late guest, Naceri attacked a 22-year-old man with an ashtray at a Paris restaurant. The actor was convicted for assault and spent two months in jail. He was released in February 2006. Then, in December 2006 he was imprisoned for racially abusing police officers. In January 2007 he was accused of attempted murder after stabbing a security guard in Aix-en-Provence. He was sentenced to nine months in prison (six months suspended) for violence and was also sentenced to one month in prison for assaulting two guards at a medical center where he was being treated for overdosing on drugs.

== Filmography ==
- 1980: Inspector Blunder (Extra)
- 1989: La Révolution française directed by Robert Enrico and Richard T. Heffron (uncredited)
- 1994: Léon directed by Luc Besson
- 1994: Frères directed by Olivier Dahan
- 1995: Coup de vice directed by Zak Fishman
- 1995: Raï directed by Thomas Gilou
- 1996: Malik le maudit directed by Youcef Hamidi
- 1996: La Légende de Dede directed by Antonio Olivares
- 1997: Bouge! directed by Jérôme Cornuau
- 1997: Autre chose à foutre qu'aimer directed by Carole Giacobbi
- 1998: Taxi directed by Gérard Pirès
- 1998: Cantique de la racaille directed by Vincent Ravalec
- 1999: Un pur moment de rock'n'roll directed by Manuel Boursinhac
- 1999: Une pour toutes directed by Claude Lelouch
- 2000: Taxi 2 directed by Gérard Krawczyk
- 2000: Là-bas, mon pays directed by Alexandre Arcady
- 2001: Le Petit Poucet directed by Olivier Dahan
- 2001: Nid de guêpes (The Nest) directed by Florent Emilio Siri
- 2001: La Merveilleuse Odyssée de l'idiot toboggan directed by Vincent Ravalec
- 2001: The Repentant directed by Laetitia Masson
- 2001: Féroce directed by Gilles de Maistre
- 2002: La Mentale directed by Manuel Boursinhac
- 2002: Concerto pour un violon directed by Gilles de Maistre
- 2002: Disparu directed by Gilles de Maistre
- 2002: Tapis volant directed by Youcef Hamidi
- 2003: Taxi 3 directed by Gérard Krawczyk
- 2003: Finding Nemo directed by Andrew Stanton (voice of Crush the sea turtle in the French dubbed version)
- 2004: Bab el web directed by Merzak Allouache
- 2006: Indigènes directed by Rachid Bouchareb
- 2007: Taxi 4 directed by Gérard Krawczyk
- 2008: Des poupées et des anges directed by Nora Hamidi
- 2012: Ce que le jour doit à la nuit, directed by Alexandre Arcady
- 2013: Tip Top
- 2013: Günahsız Günahım (MV)
- 2015: Heliopsis, directed by Sandra Kobanovitch
- 2021: Redemption Day, directed by Hicham Hajji
- 2023: Atoman, directed by Anouar Moatassim
- 2024: The Saint 2

== Awards and nominations ==
Winner

2006: Cannes Film Festival - Best Actor

1995: Locarno International Film Festival - Best Actor

1995: Festival du Film de Paris - Special Mention

Nominated

1999: Cesar Award for Most Promising Actor
