= Taxi 2 =

2000 French film by Gérard Krawczyk

- Theatrical release poster
- Directed by: Gérard Krawczyk
- Written by: Luc Besson
- Produced by: Luc Besson; Michele Petin; Laurent Petin
- Starring: Samy Naceri; Frédéric Diefenthal; Marion Cotillard; Emma Sjoberg; Bernard Farcy
- Cinematography: Thierry Guilmaro
- Edited by: Thierry Hoss
- Music by: Olivier "Akos" Castelli; Al Khemya; IAM
- Production companies: Leeloo Productions; ARP Sélection; TF1 Films Production; Le Studio Canal+
- Distributed by: ARP Sélection
- Release date: 25 March 2000 (Marseille)
- Running time: 88 minutes
- Country: France
- Language: French
- Budget: $10.5 million
- Box office: $64.4 million

Taxi 2 (French: Taxi Deux) is a 2000 French action comedy film directed by Gérard Krawczyk and released in March 2000. Starring Samy Naceri, Frédéric Diefenthal and Marion Cotillard, it is the second installment in the Taxi film series. It is a sequel to Taxi (1998), written by Luc Besson and directed by Gérard Pirès in 1999. It was followed by Taxi 3 (2003) in January 2003.

A video game adaptation was released by Ubi Soft, also in 2000.

== Plot ==
A Japanese minister of defence is traveling to Paris to sign a weapons contract between Japan and France, but first, he is visiting Marseille to view and rate the city police's anti gang tactics (using fake attacks on him).

During the visit, however, he is kidnapped by a group working for the Japanese yakuza. Emilien (Frédéric Diefenthal) is determined to rescue the minister and detective Petra (Emma Sjöberg), his girlfriend who was also kidnapped, and restore the honour of his department. Once again, speed demon taxi driver Daniel (Samy Naceri) is called upon to save the day with his high speed driving skills.

Also with the Peugeot, the Mitsubishi Lancer Evolution VI is also featured as a star car driven by the yakuza.

== Cast ==
- Samy Naceri as Daniel Morales
- Frédéric Diefenthal as Émilien Coutant-Kerbalec
- Marion Cotillard as Lilly Bertineau
- Emma Sjöberg as Petra
- Bernard Farcy as Commissaire Gérard Gibert
- Jean-Christophe Bouvet as Général de division Edmond Bertineau
- Frédérique Tirmont as Mme Bertineau
- Tsuyu Shimizu as Yuli
- Édouard Montoute as Alain Trésor
- Ko Suzuki as Katano
- Yoshi Oida as Yuki Tsumoto
- Jean-Louis Schlesser as himself

== Production ==
=== Development ===
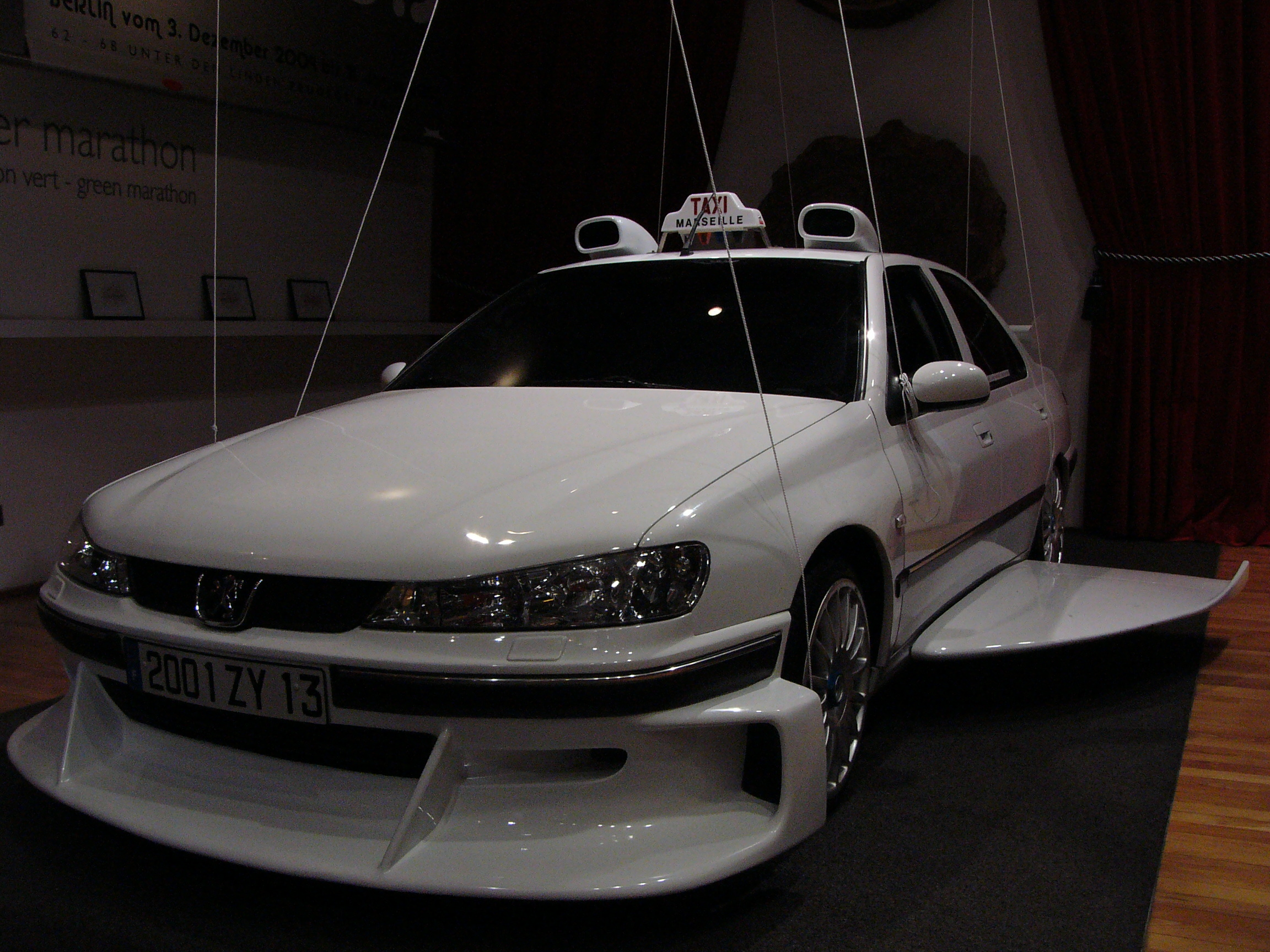
Peugeot 406

Production started immediately after the massive success of the first film in the theaters, but this time Besson wanted to up his share of the split with the production company ARP to 70/30 from 50/50. Lead of ARP and Besson's friend Pétin grit his teeth, as he had carried the first project, but he agreed. The director of the first film Gérard Pirès was replaced by Gérard Krawczyk, who detractors say was more controllable, but who responded back stating he did what he wanted without needing to respect the scenarios laid by Besson.

=== Cameraman death ===
On Monday, August 16, 1999, only two weeks into filming, Boulevard de l'Amiral-Bruix was closed to traffic for the length between Porte Dauphine and Porte Maillot. The Peugeot 406 had to come speeding out of the tunnel, head on to the springboard, jump over two AMX-30 tanks and land on a bed of boxes and mattresses. After an unsuccessful first try, the stunt coordinator Rémy Julienne with 35 years of experience and credit of 4000 films including six James Bond films, decided to increase the incline of the springboard a bit and also up the car's running speed. On the second take, the taxi took off faster and higher, landing a few meters further than expected, hitting the 41-year-old cameraman Alain Dutartre, his assistant and a third person. Dutartre died a few hours later in the hospital. The assistant had both of his legs broken. Besson was in Los Angeles at the time and was contacted immediately. He flew to the set, where detectives were already investigating the matter. Filming had to continue, but did so in a somber mood.

In June 2002, Luc Besson was summoned to court. Authorities alleged safety was compromised in an effort to cut costs. The stunt coordinator Rémy Julienne was given a one-year suspended jail sentence, and fined €13,000. Luc Besson, Grenet and director Gerard Krawczyk were initially cleared of charges. But the Paris Court of Appeal reversed the ruling in June 2009, and EuropaCorp was convicted of involuntary manslaughter, and ordered to pay €100,000. Julienne's jail sentence was reduced to six months, and his fine was reduced from €13,000 to €2,000, but he was required to pay the Dutartre family €50,000 in court costs.

== Reception ==
=== Box office ===
The film opened in Marseille, France on 25 March 2000 on nine screens and had 17,800 admissions. Opening nationwide on a record 830 screens on 29 March 2000, the film set an opening day and week record in France. It had 759,512 admissions on opening day, beating the record set by Asterix and Obelix vs. Caesar, and over 3 million admissions for the week, beating the record set by The Visitors II: The Corridors of Time. It went on to have 10.3 million admissions in France (the highest for the year) and 5 million in 37 other countries worldwide. It also had good TV ratings with 10 million viewers on TF1.

=== Critical response ===
Neil Smith, reviewing the film for BBC, gave it two stars out of five and writes that it's a "virtual reprise of the 1998 French box-office smash" and while "there's very little of merit in this tongue-in-cheek actioner, it at least delivers the requisite amount of high-octane thrills."

== Sequel ==
A sequel titled Taxi 3, was released in 2003.

== Video game ==
A video game based on the movie was published by Ubi Soft and released in France only in 2000 for the PC, Dreamcast (both versions developed by Blue Sphere Games), PlayStation (developed by DC Studios) and Game Boy Color (developed by Visual Impact).
