= Sandra Kobanovitch =

French film director (born 1993)

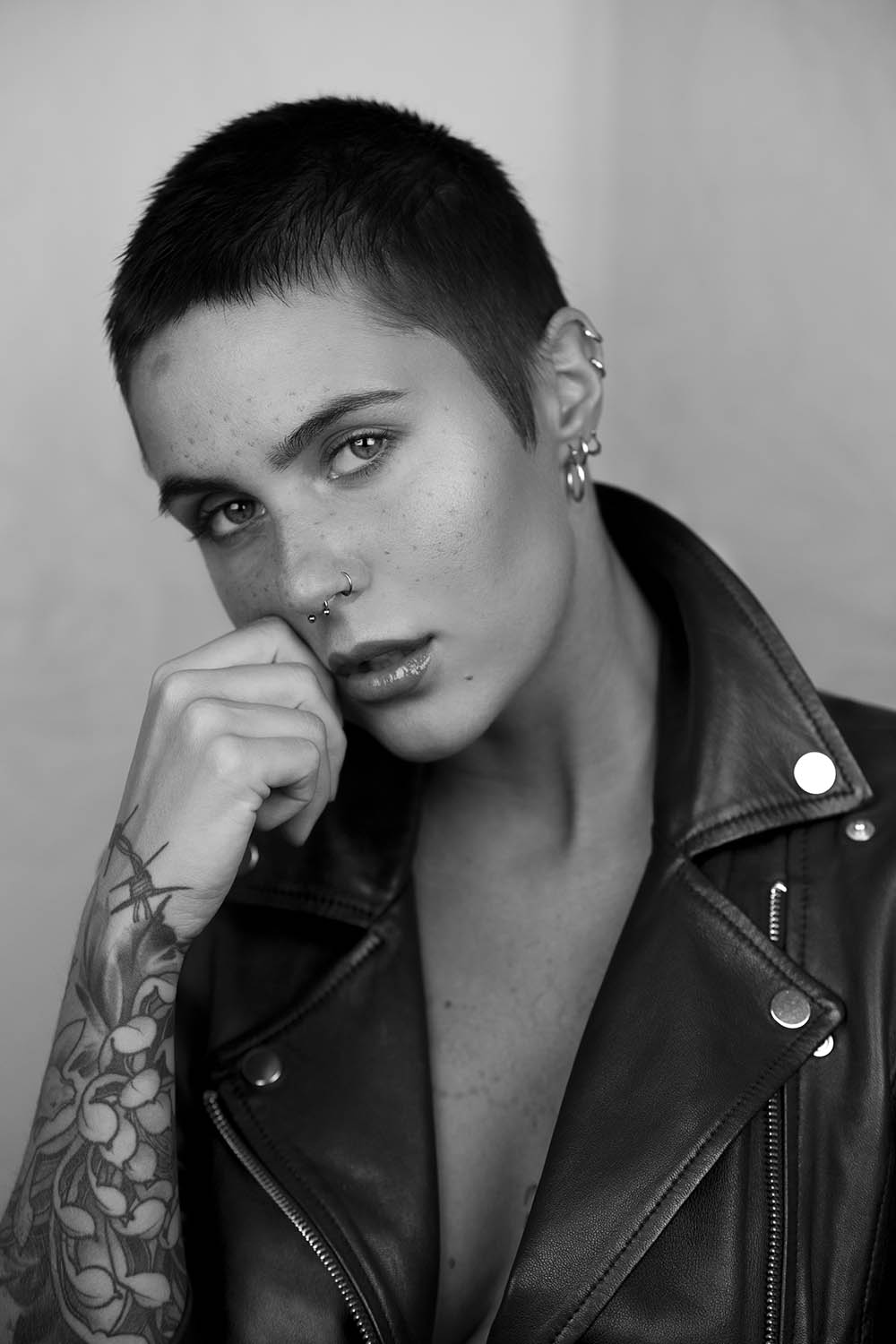
- Kobanovitch in September 2019
- Born: 1993 (age 31–32); Rueil-Malmaison, France
- Occupation(s): Film director, screenwriter, photographer

Sandra Kobanovitch, also known by the pseudonym Sandra-Jessica Koban (born 1993, in Rueil-Malmaison, France), is a French film director, screenwriter, and photographer, best known for her short films Scratch (2015), which she starred in, and which premiered at the Cannes Film Festival, Heliopsis (2015), starring Samy Naceri, which played at the Vancouver International Women in Film Festival, and won the festival's award for best cinematography. For her photography, she won a fine art award at the Tokyo International Foto Awards in Japan in 2024.

== Filmography ==
- 2015: Scratch (short film)
- 2015: Heliopsis (short film)
- 2023: Donald (short film)
