= Taxi 3 =

2003 French film by Gérard Krawczyk

- Theatrical release poster
- Directed by: Gérard Krawczyk
- Written by: Luc Besson
- Produced by: Luc Besson
- Starring: Samy Naceri; Frédéric Diefenthal; Marion Cotillard; Bernard Farcy
- Distributed by: EuropaCorp
- Release date: January 29, 2003 (France)
- Running time: 87 minutes
- Country: France
- Language: French
- Budget: $14.5 million
- Box office: $64.5 million

Taxi 3 (French: Taxi Trois) is a 2003 French action comedy film directed by Gérard Krawczyk. It stars Samy Naceri, Frédéric Diefenthal and Marion Cotillard, and is the third installment in the Taxi film series. The film is a sequel to Taxi 2 (2000) and was followed by Taxi 4 (2007).

== Cast ==
- Samy Naceri as Daniel Morales
- Frédéric Diefenthal as Émilien Coutant-Kerbalec
- Marion Cotillard as Lilly Bertineau
- Bernard Farcy as the Commissaire Gérard Gibert
- Édouard Montoute as Alain
- Emma Wiklund as Petra
- Jean-Christophe Bouvet as the General Edmond Bertineau
- Patrice Abbou as Rachid
- Claude Sese as Planton
- Alain David as the Minister
- Sylvester Stallone had an uncredited cameo at the beginning of the film as a passenger to the airport. Since he cannot speak French, his voice was dubbed by his official French dub-over artist, Alain Dorval.

== Production ==
Filming for Taxi 3 was initially scheduled to begin on October 7, 2001, but officially commenced on October 15, 2001. The shoot began at a studio in Paris before moving to Marseille. Production was temporarily halted at the end of November 2001 to allow time for the preparation of a specially modified Peugeot 406 fitted with tank treads, required for the scenes set in Val-d’Isère. The break was also partly due to lead actor Samy Naceri's concurrent involvement in the filming of La Mentale. Filming later resumed in Tignes-Val-d’Isère on January 18, 2002.

On November 11, 2001, an accident occurred during the filming of a car chase scene involving a Citroën C5, driven by a stuntwoman portraying the character Qiu. While being pursued by the taxi, the Citroën lost control on a bend and collided with a tree. The accident was attributed to a combination of excessive speed and slippery road conditions. The stuntwoman was left permanently disabled and later attempted legal action seeking compensation, but was unsuccessful.

== Music ==
=== Soundtrack ===
The Taxi 3 soundtrack features a mix of previously unreleased tracks by French rap and R&B artists, alongside contributions from international performers such as Pharrell Williams and his band N.E.R.D. Most tracks were produced by the French production duo Kore & Skalp.

Two music videos were created to promote the film:

- “Qu’est-C’tu fous cette nuit?” by Busta Flex & Humphrey, directed by Olivier Megaton.
- “Match Nul” by Éloquence & Kayliah, directed by Raphael IV.

Both music videos are featured as bonus content on the official Taxi 3 DVD release.

The album sold over 130,000 copies in France and was certified Gold.

Track listing

1. “Making Off (Générique)” - Dadoo
2. “Qu’est-C’tu fous cette nuit?” - Busta Flex & Humphrey
3. “Match Nul” - Éloquence & Kayliah
4. “Tout ce qu’on sait” - Booba & Nessbeal
5. “Plus vite que jamais” - Lara
6. “Where’s Yours At?” - Pharrell Williams & Rohff
7. “10 minutes chrono” - 113
8. “Vivre sans ça” - China, Dadoo & Diam's
9. “Faut conduire” - Ärsenik & Lara
10. “Tarif C” - Oxmo Puccino
11. “L’Ignition” - Willy Denzey
12. “J’accélère” - Pit Baccardi
13. “Profite” - Costello
14. “Laissez-nous vivre” - Corneille
15. “Petite sœur” - Dadoo & Leslie
16. “Problème” - Intouchable & OGB
17. “Find My Way” - N.E.R.D.
18. “Love” - Lynnsha & Soundkail
19. “Espion dans l’air” - Doc Gynéco

Note: Most tracks were produced by Kore & Skalp, with contributions from DJ Mehdi, The Neptunes, Zdar, and others.

== Reception ==
Empire (magazine) rated it 3 out of 5. Rotten Tomatoes does not yet have enough critic reviews to generate a Tomatometer score for the film. Audience reviews on the site describe it as moving more towards Bond-style spoof territory, with the Peugeot featuring increasingly outlandish modifications including caterpillar tracks, and the stunts becoming more exaggerated compared to the earlier films in the series. The film's plot follows Daniel helping police catch an elusive group of thieves known as the Santa Claus Gang, while Émilien learns he is about to become a father. The film grossed $64.5 million worldwide against a budget of $14.5 million.

== Sequel ==
A sequel titled Taxi 4, was released in 2007.

== Video game ==
A video game based on the film was released exclusively in France by Ubi Soft in 2002 for the Game Boy Color and 2003 for the PlayStation 2, GameCube and Game Boy Advance.

== In popular culture ==
The opening titles are a spoof of those featured in the movies starring James Bond, and there are several nods to the 007 canon throughout the film, e.g. Daniel's rotating number plate and the ski chase at the film's climax.
