= It's Our Life! =

2005 film directed by Gérard Krawczyk

- Directed by: Gérard Krawczyk
- Written by: Gérard Krawczyk
- Based on: L'eau des fleurs by Jean-Marie Gourio
- Produced by: Jean-François Lepetit
- Starring: Josiane Balasko; Sylvie Testud
- Cinematography: Gérard Sterin
- Edited by: Nicolas Trembasiewicz
- Music by: Alexandre Azaria
- Production company: Flach Film
- Distributed by: BAC Films
- Release date: 7 December 2005
- Running time: 100 minutes
- Country: France
- Language: French
- Budget: $5.3 million
- Box office: $490.000

It's Our Life! or La vie est à nous! is a 2005 French comedy film. It was directed by Gérard Krawczyk and starred Josiane Balasko and Sylvie Testud.

== Plot ==
Blanche buries her husband, Camille. Everyone liked him in the village of Savoy. She visits a bistro, "The Stage" with her daughter, Louise. She put a cell phone in the coffin of her father so his mother "... can join at any time". Among the regulars of "The Stage" are Chip, son of a drunkard, and an alcoholic himself, to whom the two women complain of frequent competing bar of Louise Chevrier, "The Turn", across side of the road. Able to collect broken children, Louise, who believes in the power of words to heal the pain, also has a new resident, Julien refuge in his silence.

== Cast ==
- Sylvie Testud as Louise Delhomme
- Josiane Balasko as Blanche Delhomme
- Michel Muller as The chip
- Eric Cantona as Pierre
- Catherine Hiegel as Lucie Chevrier
- Carole Weiss as Irène
- Maroussia Dubreuil as Cécile
- Celia Rosich as Marion
- Danny Martinez as Clément
- Jil Milan as José
- George Aguilar as Sky
- Jacques Mathou as M. Antoine
- Agnès Château as Madame Antoine
- Laurent Gendron as Alf
- Chantal Banlier as Marguerite
- Jean Dell as The priest
- Virginie Lemoine as The mother
- Jean-Paul Lilienfeld as The father
- Aline Kassabian as The baker

== Development ==
The movie was screened at the VCU French Film Festival in 2007.
