= Hans Wiklund =

Swedish television journalist

- Born: September 17, 1964 (age 61); Bromma Parish
- Spouse: Emma Wiklund

Hans Wiklund (born 17 September 1964) is a Swedish journalist, movie critic and TV host. Wiklund has worked on shows like Bionytt on TV4 and Go C on Canal+, and currently blogs for Lovefilm Sweden. He is married to model and actress Emma Wiklund (born Sjöberg) and has two children with her. He also does the current incarnation of Sweden's version of Wheel of Fortune.
