= Peugeot 407 =

Mid-sized car by Peugeot, 2004 to 2011

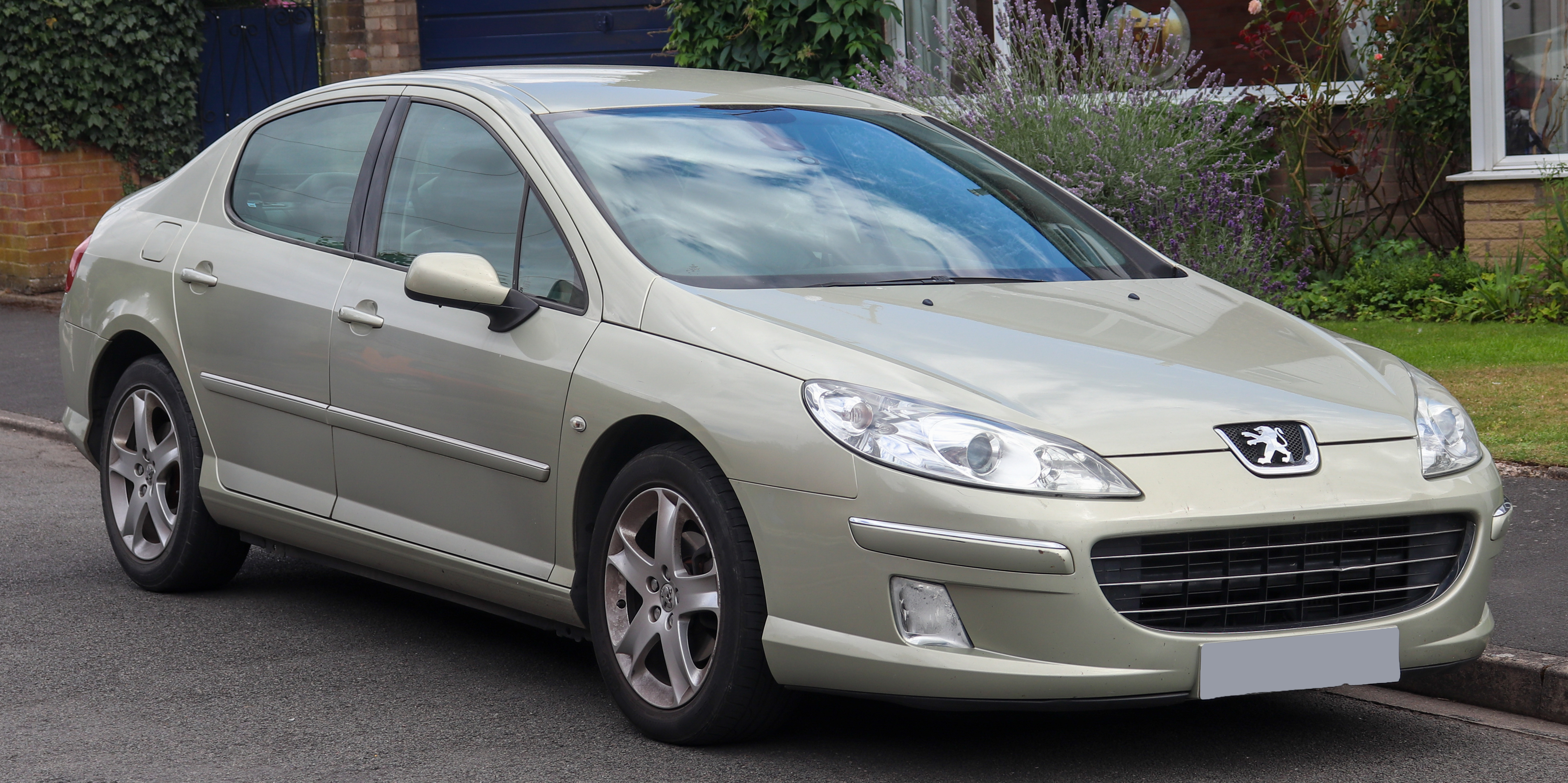
- Pre-facelift Peugeot 407

Overview
- Manufacturer: Peugeot
- Model code: (D25 - Coupé); (D22 - Wagon); (D23 - Sedan)
- Production: 2004–2011; 2005–2011 (coupé)
- Assembly: France: Rennes (Rennes Plant); Malaysia: Gurun (NAM)
- Designer: Dominique Leonard

Body and chassis
- Class: Large family car (D)
- Body style: 4-door saloon; 5-door estate; 2-door coupé
- Layout: Front-engine, front-wheel-drive
- Platform: PSA PF3 platform
- Related: Citroën C5; Citroën C6; Peugeot 607

Powertrain
- Engine: Petrol: 1.8 L EW7 16V I4; 2.0 L EW10 16V I4; 2.2 L EW12 16V I4; 3.0 L ES9 24V V6; Diesel: 1.6 L Ford/PSA DV6 HDi 16V I4 (turbo-diesel, FAP); 2.0 L DW10 HDi 16V I4 (turbo, FAP); 2.2 L DW12 HDi 16V I4 (BiTurbo); 2.7 L DT17 HDi 24V V6 (BiTurbo); 3.0 L DT20 HDi 24V V6 (BiTurbo)
- Transmission: 5-speed manual 6-speed manual 4-speed ZF 4HP20 automatic 6-speed Aisin TF80SC automatic

Dimensions
- Wheelbase: 2,725 mm (107.3 in)
- Length: 4,676 mm (184.1 in) (saloon); 4,763–4,765 mm (187.5–187.6 in) (estate); 4,815 mm (189.6 in) (coupé)
- Width: 1,811 mm (71.3 in) (saloon, estate); 1,868 mm (73.5 in) (coupé)
- Height: 1,395–1,400 mm (54.9–55.1 in) (coupé); 1,447–1,455 mm (57.0–57.3 in) (saloon); 1,485–1,486 mm (58.5–58.5 in) (estate)
- Kerb weight: 1,475–1,799 kg (3,251.8–3,966.1 lb)

Chronology
- Predecessor: Peugeot 406
- Successor: Peugeot 508

The Peugeot 407 is a large family car (D-segment) produced by the French automaker Peugeot from 2004 to 2011. It was available in saloon, coupé and estate variants, with both diesel and petrol engines. The petrol engines range from 1.8 to 3.0 litres displacement, whereas the diesel engines range from 1.6 to 3.0 litres.

In France, sales commenced in June 2004, with sales in the rest of Europe commencing the following month. According to the website of the European Car of the Year, the 407 was one of the nominees for the award in 2005.

The 407 was introduced in June 2004 as a replacement to the Peugeot 406 and was replaced in April 2011 by the Peugeot 508. The last Peugeot 407 was produced on 5 July 2011, with the coupé model remaining in production until December 2011.

== Overview ==
The 407 was the successor to the hugely successful Peugeot 406, and was launched in The Sunday Times Motorshow Live on 27 May 2004. The streamlined design of the car was seen as radical by magazines, such as Autocar, its most distinctive features being its large front grille, and the steeply raked screen pillars.

Autocar also published undisguised spy photos on three occasions throughout 2003, and commented that the rear window line of the saloon had "the similar feel to the short wheelbase of the Ferrari 250." The car was first announced and presented to the press in Paris in February 2004. There Groupe PSA (then known as PSA Peugeot Citroën) invested €1.12 billion in launching the car.

The estate, the Peugeot 407 SW, was launched four months after the saloon event, in September 2004. The coupé was launched in July 2005, having been presented at the Frankfurt Motor Show in September 2005. It went on sale in January 2006. The annual sales of the Peugeot 407 peaked at 259,000 units in 2005, with 57,000 sales outside Europe. The coupé production ended in March 2012.

The models were given a minor facelift in August 2008, resulting in most petrol engine models being withdrawn from sale in the United Kingdom and other European countries. One model was available with AMVAR (AMortissement VARiable, 'variable shock absorption') electronic suspension that controls each wheel's damping independently, adapting the hardness of the ride every 2.5 milliseconds to suit the driving style.

The 407, both in sedan and coupé versions, received 5 out of 5 stars in EuroNCAP tests.

== Design ==
The design of the car is very curved, which brings the design of the 407 more in line with the smaller Peugeot 307's looks. Its "face" features have angry-looking eyes and a big mouth. These changes from the more conservative looks of previous models have received both praise and criticism.

The pre-facelift saloon model has a 0.29 drag coefficient.

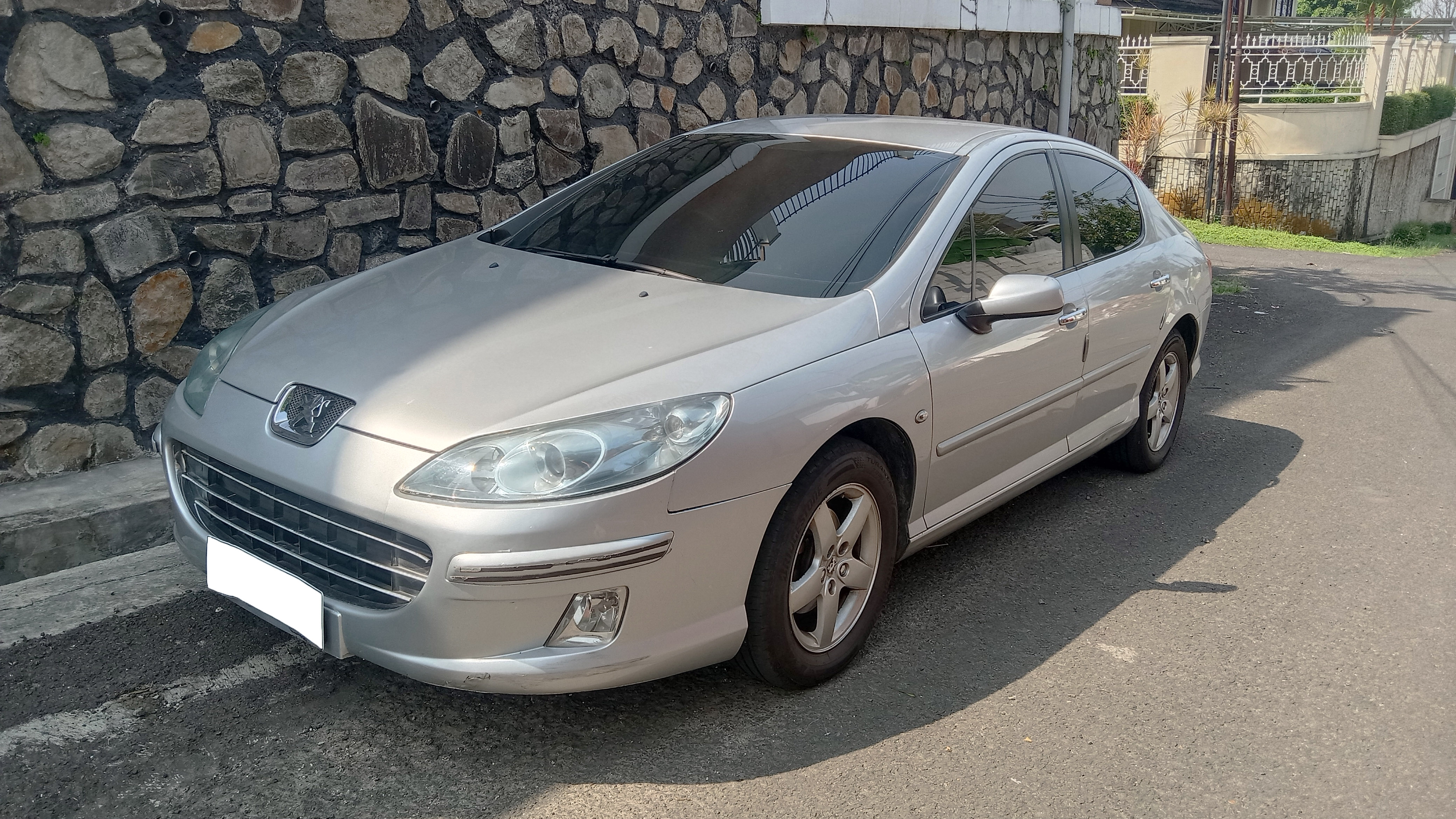
Sedan (pre-facelift) front view

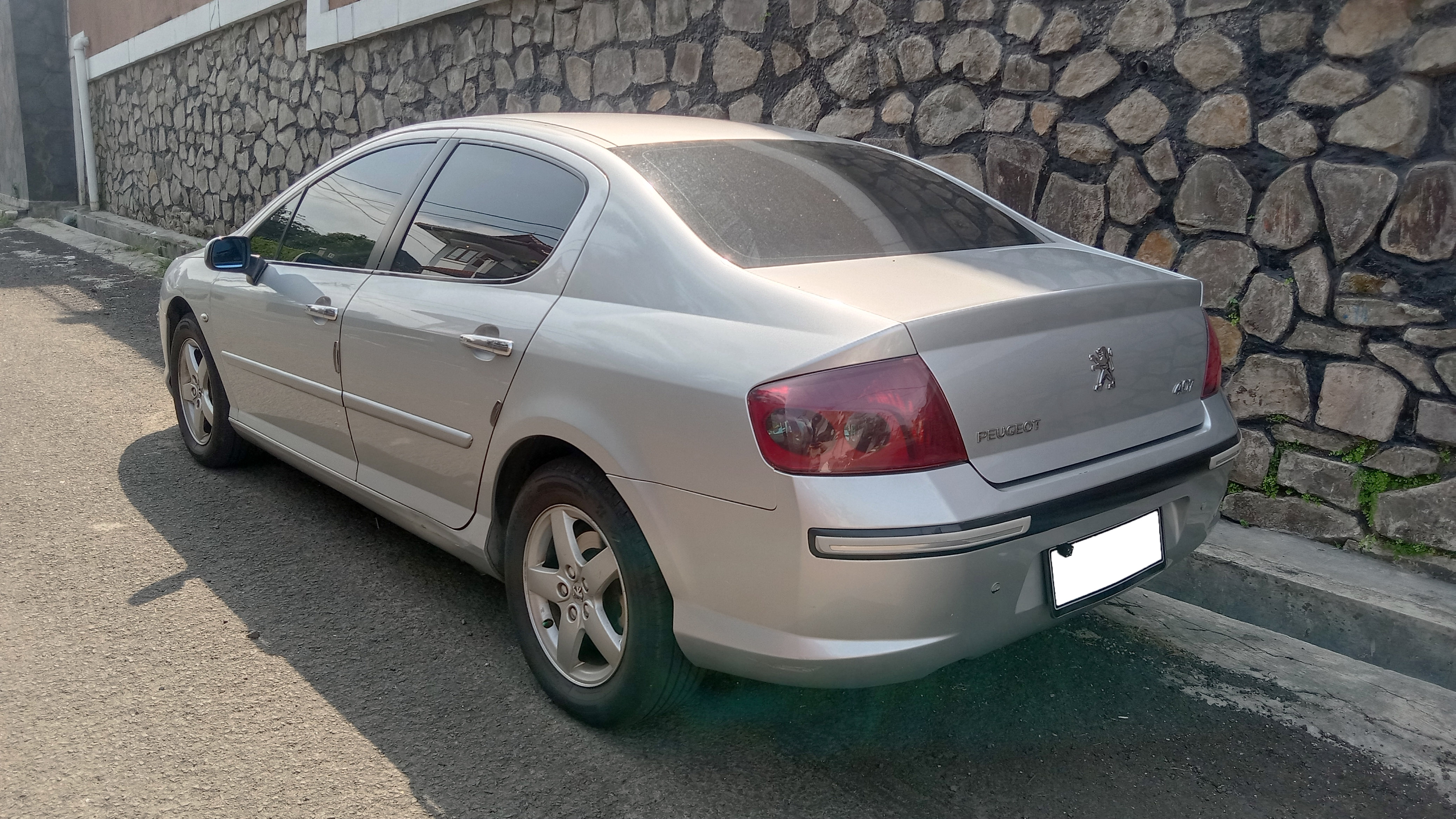
Sedan (pre-facelift) rear view

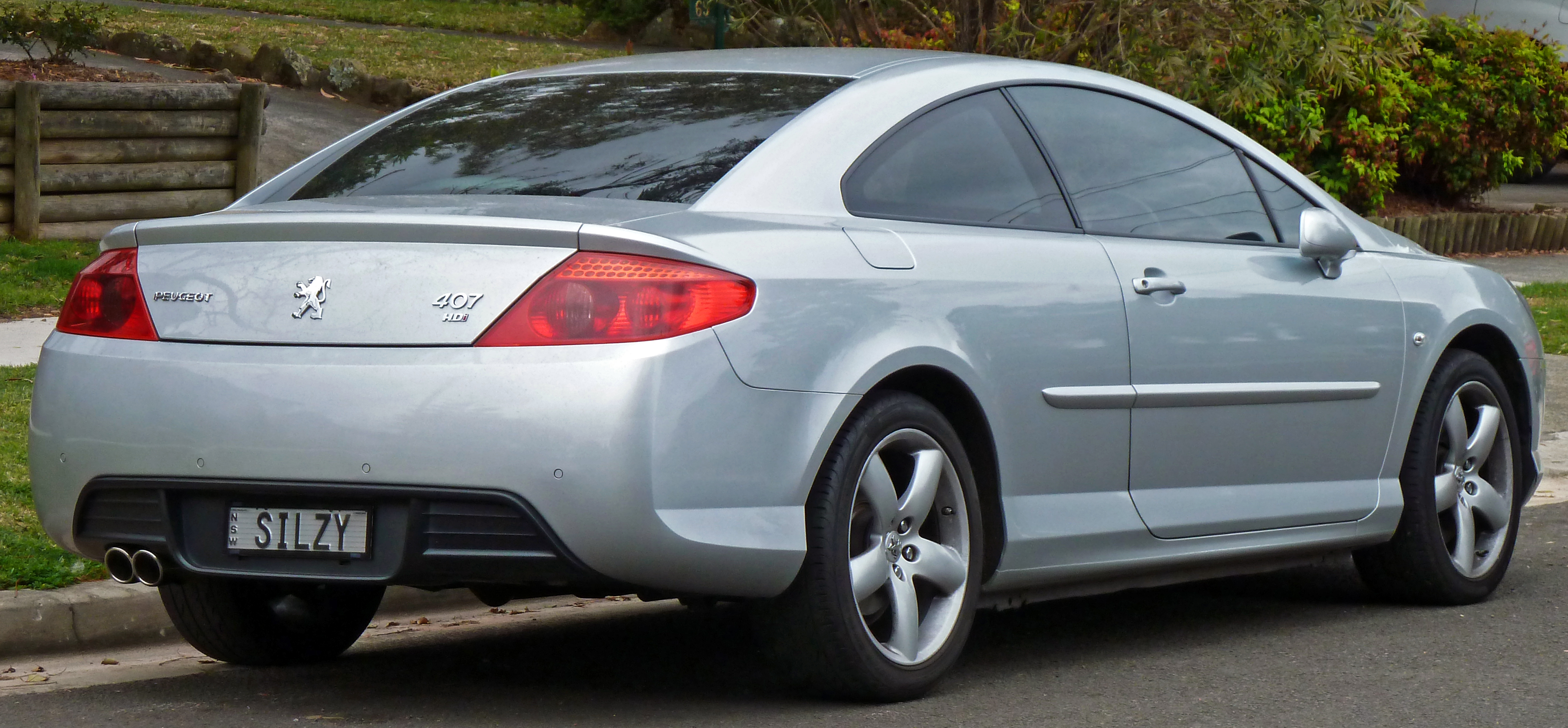
Coupé

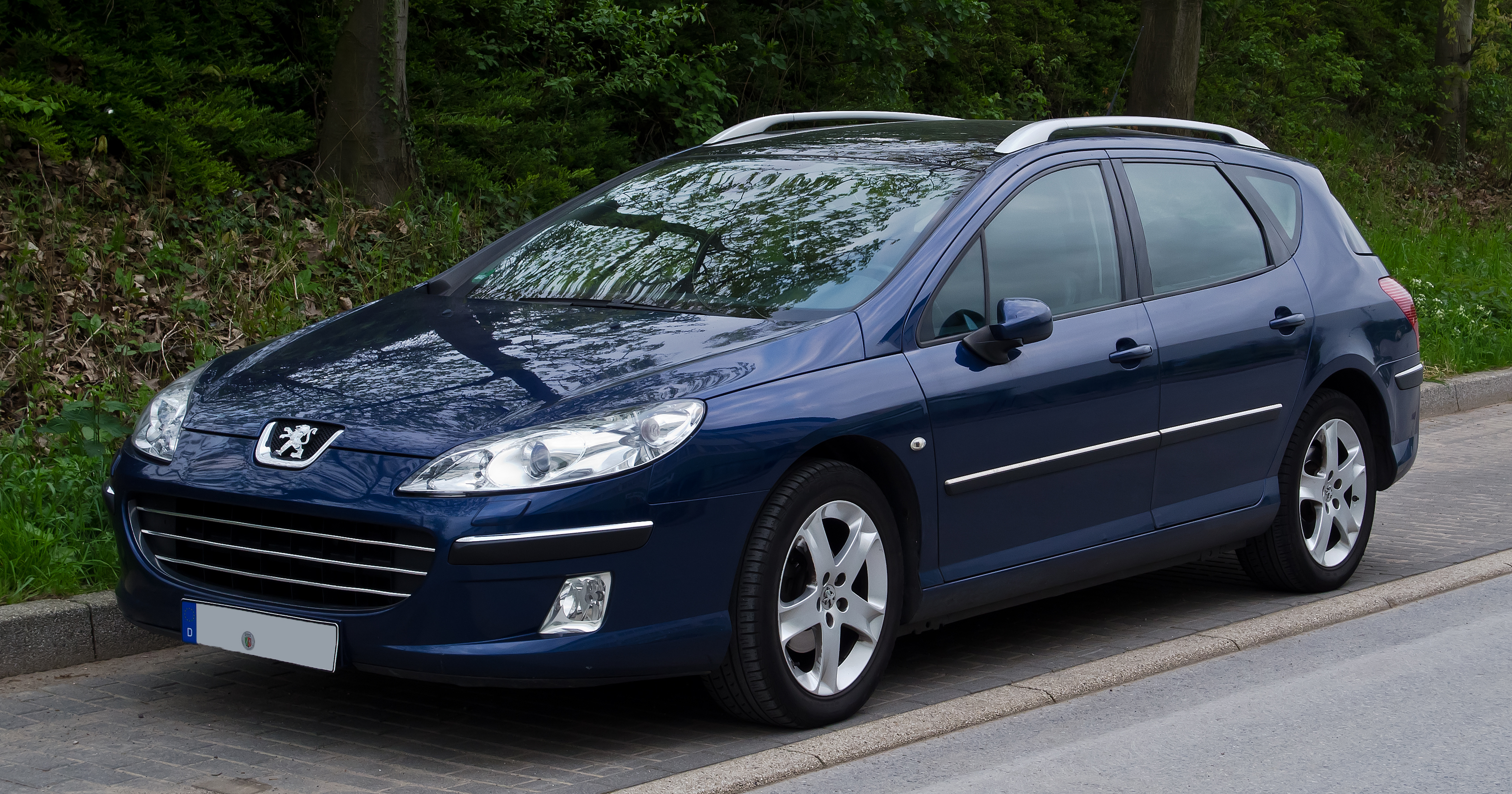
SW (pre facelift)

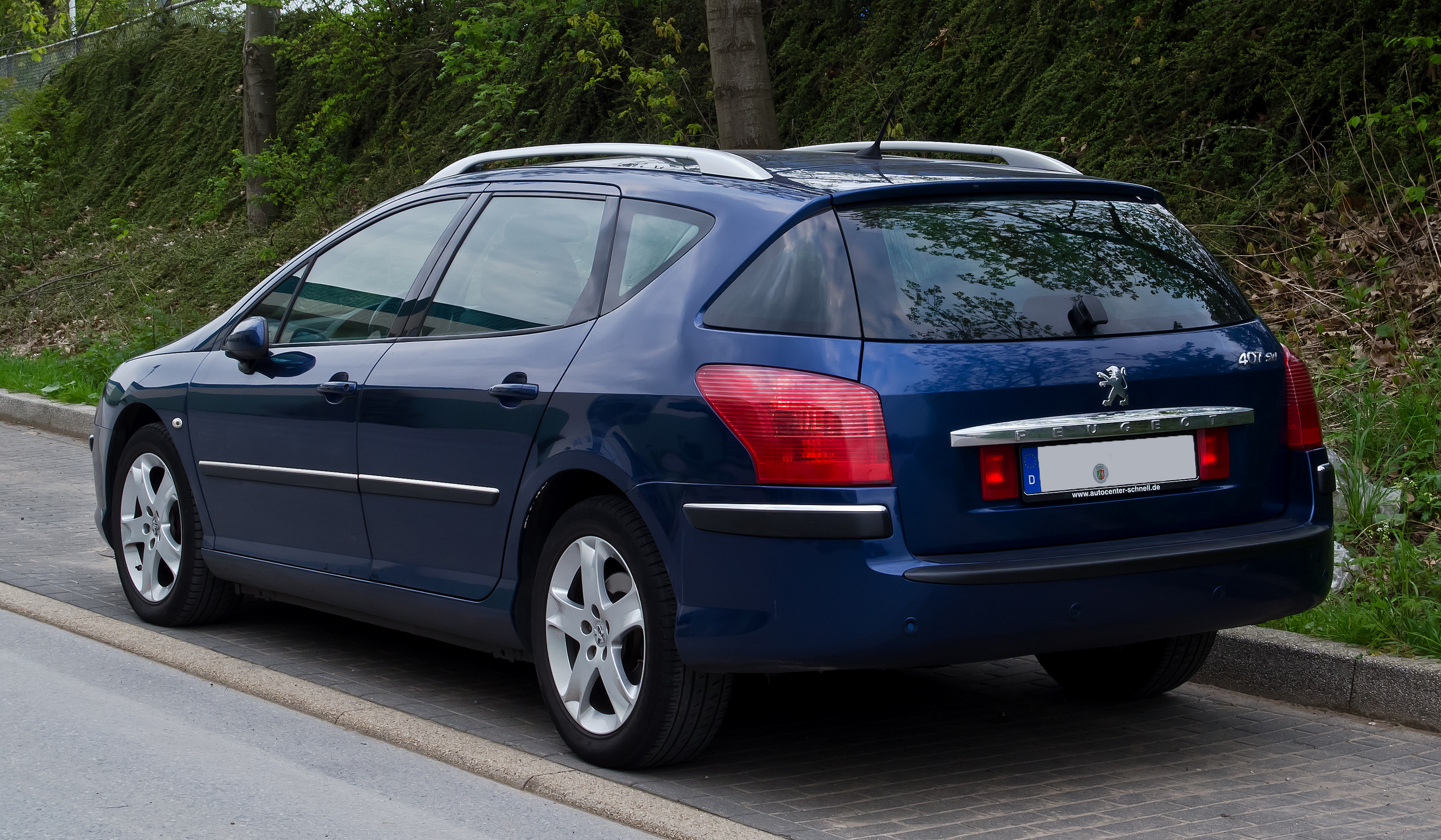
SW (pre facelift)

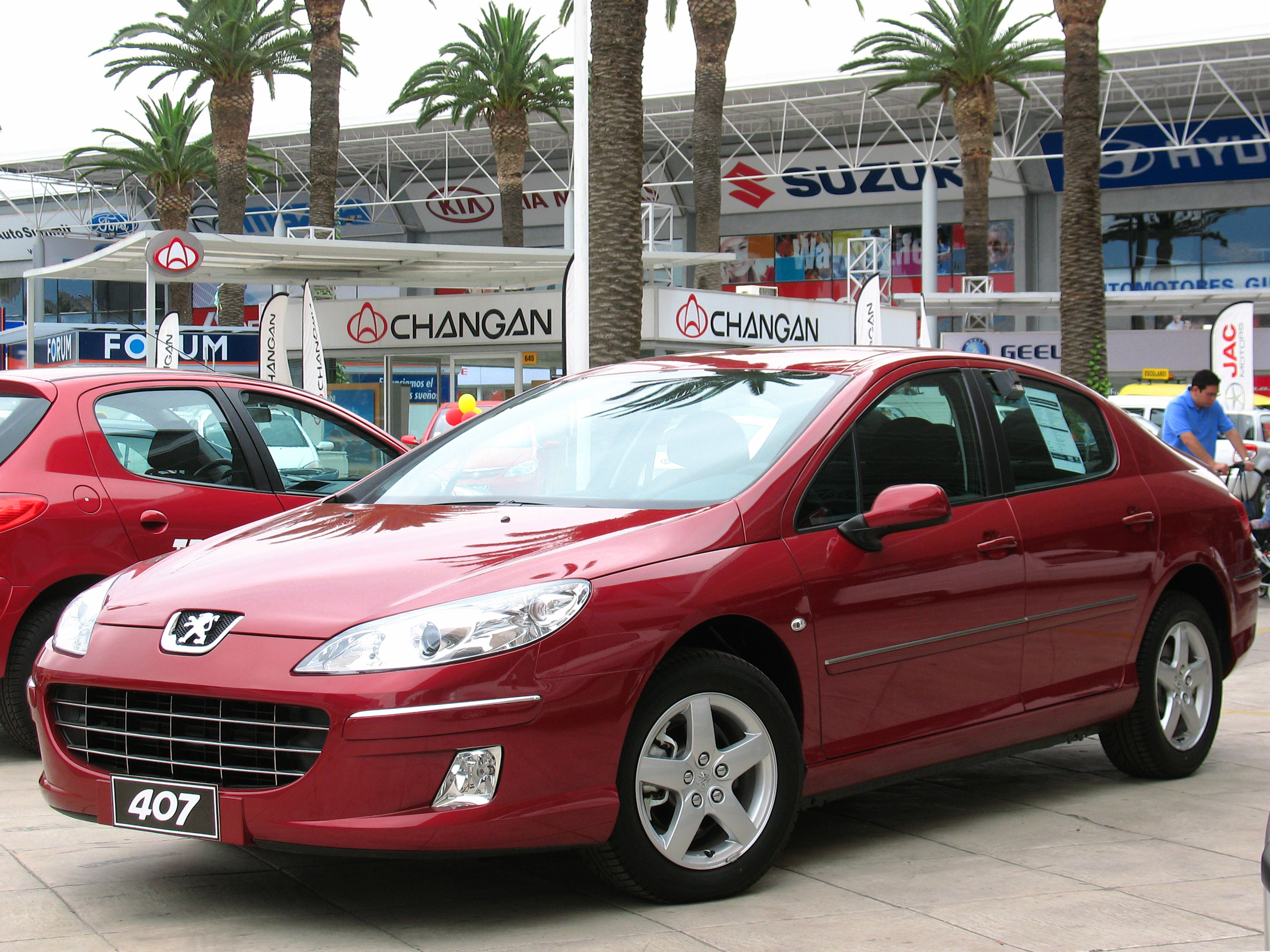
Sedan (facelift)

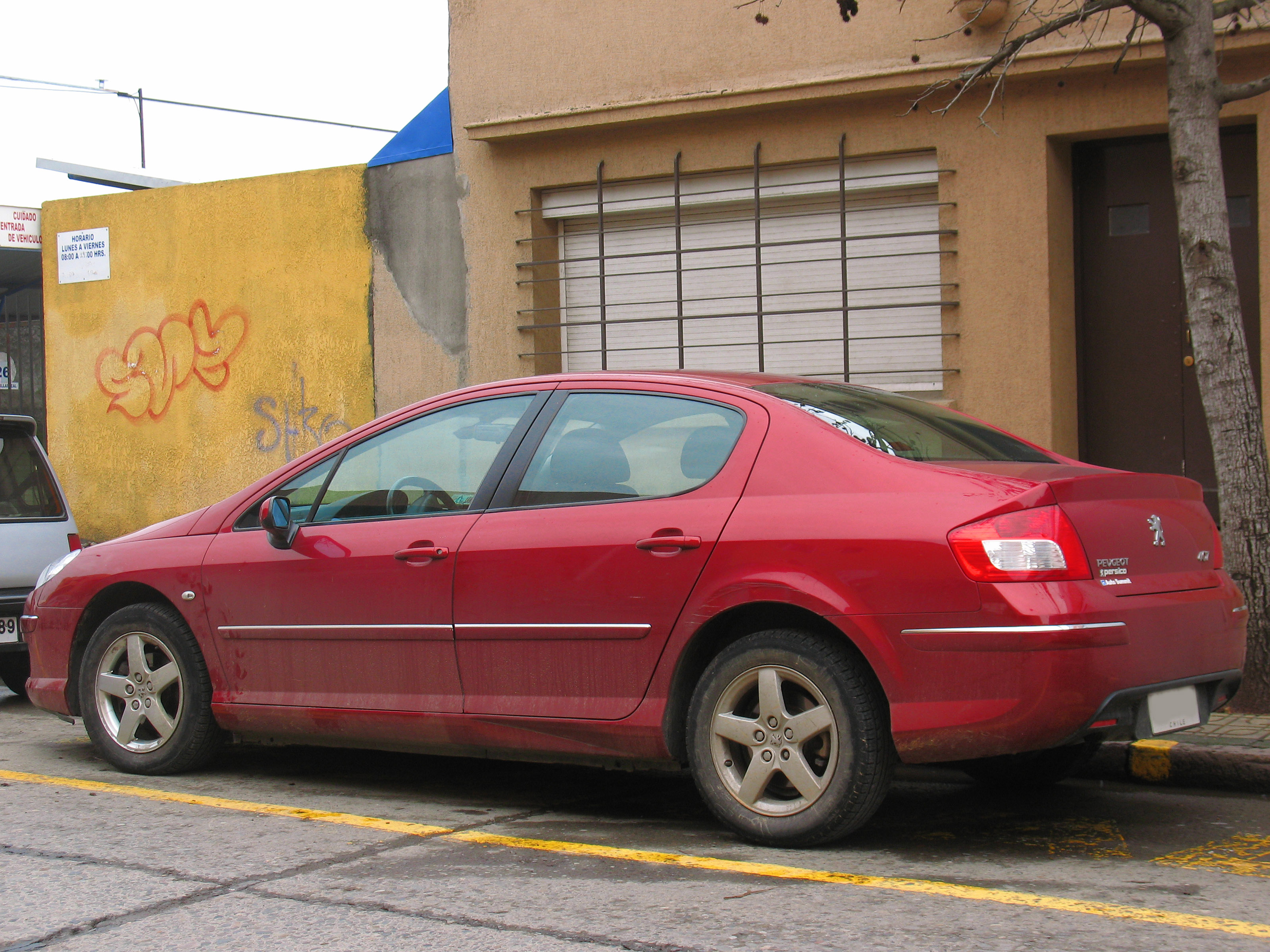
Sedan (facelift)

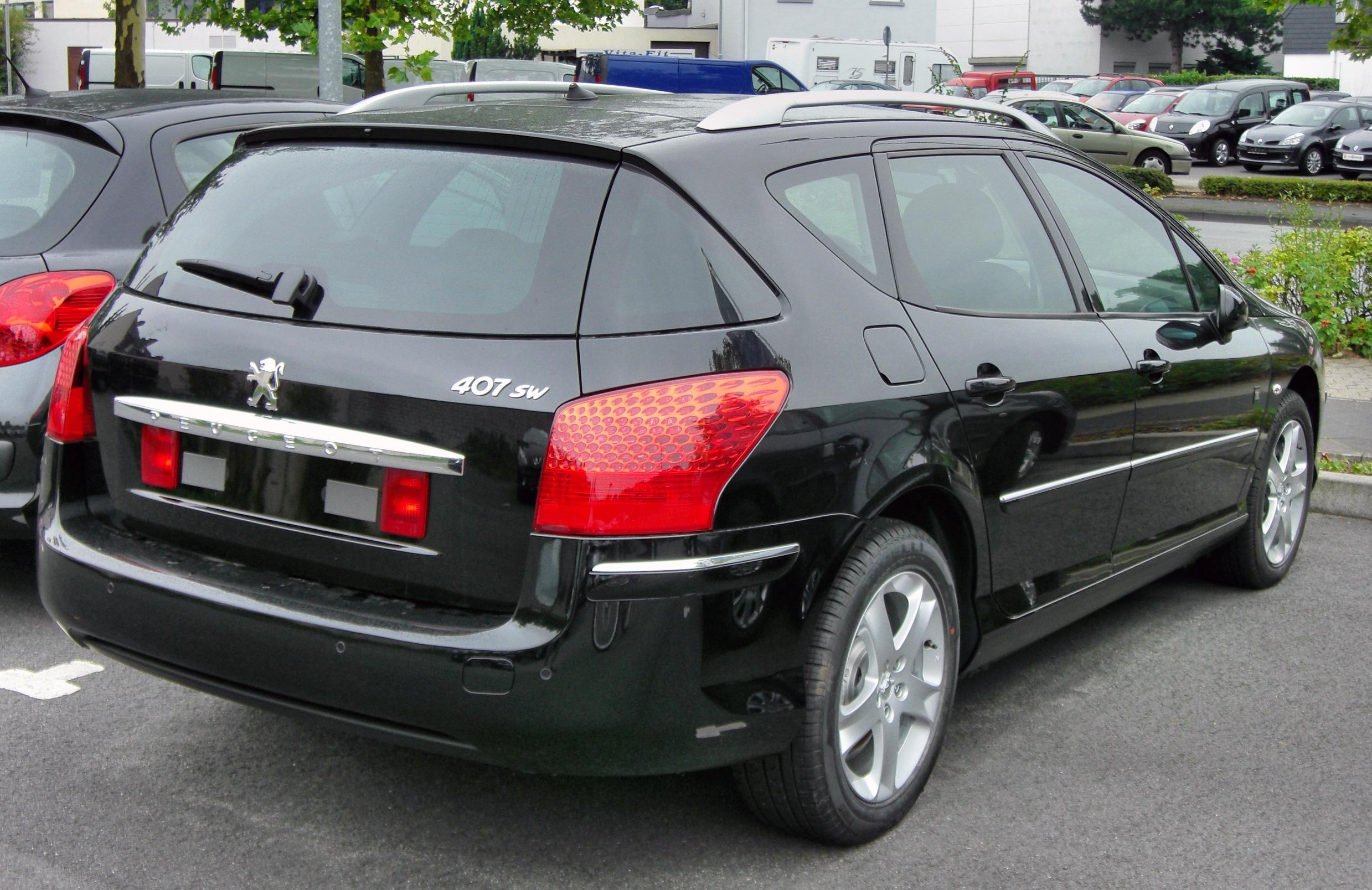
SW (facelift)

== Safety ==
ANCAP test results Peugeot 407 sedan (2004)
Test	Score
Overall	5 /5 stars
Frontal offset	15.34/16
Side impact	14.32/16
Pole	2/2
Seat belt reminders	2/3
Whiplash protection	Not Assessed
Pedestrian protection	Marginal
Electronic stability control	Standard

ANCAP test results Peugeot 407 2 door coupe (2006)
Test	Score
Overall	5 /5 stars
Frontal offset	16/16
Side impact	15.21/16
Pole	2/2
Seat belt reminders	2/3
Whiplash protection	Not Assessed
Pedestrian protection	Marginal
Electronic stability control	Standard

Euro NCAP test results 407 saloon, LHD (2004)
Test	Score	Rating
Adult occupant:	34	5 /5 stars
Child occupant:	39	4 /5 stars
Pedestrian:	15	2 /4 stars

Euro NCAP test results 407 coupe (2005)
Test	Score	Rating
Adult occupant:	35	5 /5 stars
Child occupant:	42	4 /5 stars
Pedestrian:	15	2 /4 stars

== Engines ==
All engines have DOHC and four valves per cylinder. All petrol engines have multi-point fuel injection. All diesels have common rail direct injection

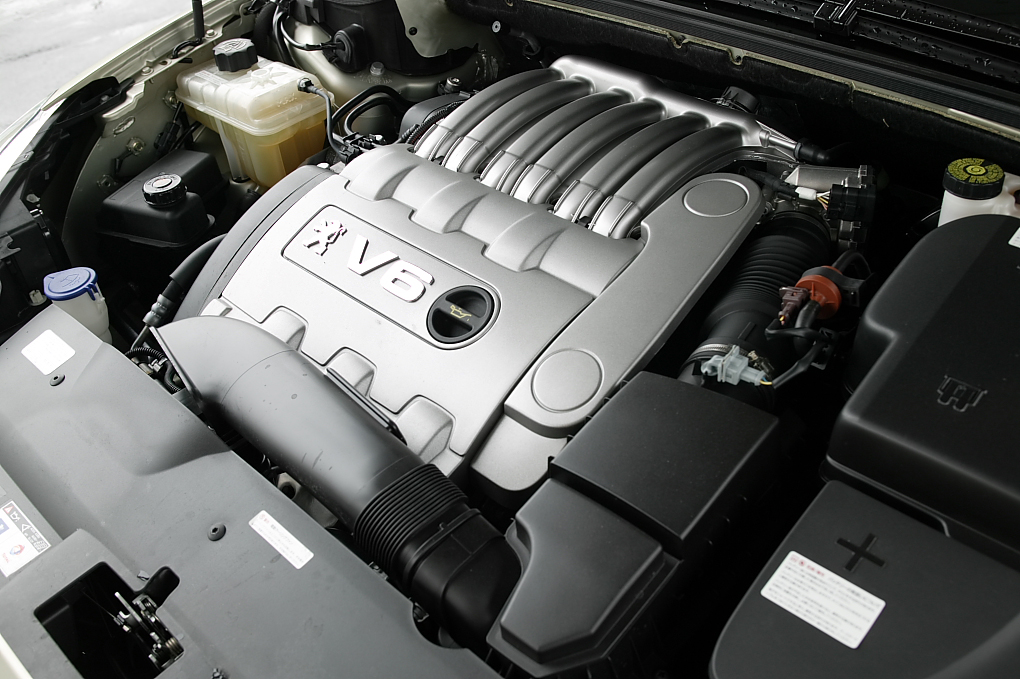
Peugeot 407 V6 (petrol engine)

Model	Engine type	Displacement Cylinders	Max. power at rpm	Max. torque at rpm	0–100 km/h (0-62 mph)	V_{max}	Years
Petrol Engines
1.8	EW7 J4 (6FZ)	1,749 cc I4	118 PS (87 kW; 116 hp) @ 5,500 rpm	163 N⋅m (120 lb⋅ft) @ 4,500 rpm	11.3 s	200 km/h (124 mph)	2004–2005
1.8	EW7 (6FY)	1,749 cc I4	125 PS (92 kW; 123 hp) @ 6,000 rpm	170 N⋅m (125 lb⋅ft) @ 3,750 rpm	10.3 s	203 km/h (126 mph)	2005–2010
2.0	EW10 J4 (RFN)	1,997 cc I4	136 PS (100 kW; 134 hp) @ 6,000 rpm	190 N⋅m (140 lb⋅ft) @ 4,100 rpm	10.3 s	212 km/h (132 mph)	2004–2005
2.0	EW10 A (RFJ)	1,997 cc I4	140 PS (103 kW; 138 hp) @ 6,000 rpm	200 N⋅m (148 lb⋅ft) @ 4,000 rpm	10.3 s	213 km/h (132 mph)	2005–2011
2.2	EW12 J4 (3FZ)	2,230 cc I4	158 PS (116 kW; 156 hp) @ 5,650 rpm	217 N⋅m (160 lb⋅ft) @ 3,900 rpm	9.0 s (Man) 10.7 (Auto) SW: 11.1 s (Auto)	220 km/h (137 mph)	2004–2005
2.2	EW12 J4 (3FY)	2,230 cc I4	163 PS (120 kW; 161 hp) @ 5,875 rpm	220 N⋅m (162 lb⋅ft) @ 4,150 rpm	10.1 s	222 km/h (138 mph)	2005–2009
3.0	ES9 A (XFV)	2,946 cc V6	211 PS (155 kW; 208 hp) @ 6,000 rpm	290 N⋅m (214 lb⋅ft) @ 3,750 rpm	8.7 s (Auto)	235 km/h (146 mph)	2004–2009
Diesel Engines
1.6 HDi	DV6 TED4 (9HY/9HZ)	1,560 cc I4	109 PS (80 kW; 108 hp) @ 4,000 rpm	240 N⋅m (177 lb⋅ft) @ 1,750 rpm	13.1 s	192 km/h (119 mph)	2004–2010
2.0 HDi	DW10 BTED4 (RHR)	1,997 cc I4	136 PS (100 kW; 134 hp) @ 4,000 rpm	320 N⋅m (236 lb⋅ft) @ 2,000 rpm	9.8 s (Man) 10.7 (Auto) SW: 11.2s (Auto)	208 km/h (129 mph)	2004–2009
2.0 HDi	DW10 BTED4 (RHF)	1,997 cc I4	140 PS (103 kW; 138 hp) @ 4,000 rpm	320 N⋅m (236 lb⋅ft) @ 2,000 rpm	9.8 s	208 km/h (129 mph)	2008–2010
2.0 HDi	DW10 CTED4 (RHH)	1,997 cc I4	163 PS (120 kW; 161 hp) @ 3,750 rpm	340 N⋅m (251 lb⋅ft) @ 2,000–3,000 rpm	9.6 s	210 km/h (130 mph)	2009–2011
2.2 HDi	DW12 BTED4 (4HT)	2,179 cc I4	170 PS (125 kW; 168 hp) @ 4,000 rpm	370 N⋅m (273 lb⋅ft) @ 1,500 rpm	8.7 s	225 km/h (140 mph)	2006–2010
2.7 HDi	DT17 TED4 (UHZ)	2,720 cc V6	204 PS (150 kW; 201 hp) @ 4,000 rpm	440 N⋅m (325 lb⋅ft) @ 1,900 rpm	8.5 s	230 km/h (143 mph)	2006–2009
3.0 HDi	DT20 C	2,993 cc V6	241 PS (177 kW; 238 hp) @ 3,800 rpm	450 N⋅m (332 lb⋅ft) @ 1,600 rpm	7.9 s	245 km/h (152 mph)	2009–2011

== Television commercials ==
The first advertisement, known as "The Toys" or "Les Jouets", featured life-size toy cars shown up by the sleek newly released Peugeot 407. Directed by Philippe André, for agency BETC Euro RSCG, the advert was filmed in Sydney, Australia. As a result, cars are shown crossing the Sydney Harbour Bridge. André developed twenty model cars, especially for the shoot. This campaign was launched in June 2004.

The soundtrack was provided by French duo The Film (Guillaume Brière & Benjamin Lebeau), with their song "Can You Touch Me", an adaptation of their earlier song "Can You Trust Me".

The next advertisement featured the same scenario of life-size toy cars in Sydney, this time taking a new Peugeot 407 SW out of the city to a beachside home. Along the way, we see old and decrepit station wagons breaking down or suffering from image problems. The soundtrack features "(Lady) Hear Me Tonight" by the Modjo. The commercials used the slogan "Playtime is Over", which some perceived to be the retort to the then slogan of Renault's Laguna, "Serious Playtime", which was launched in August 2002.

The slogan given at the end in Spanish was "Volvamos a hablar de automóviles" ("Let's talk about cars again").

== 407 concept cars ==
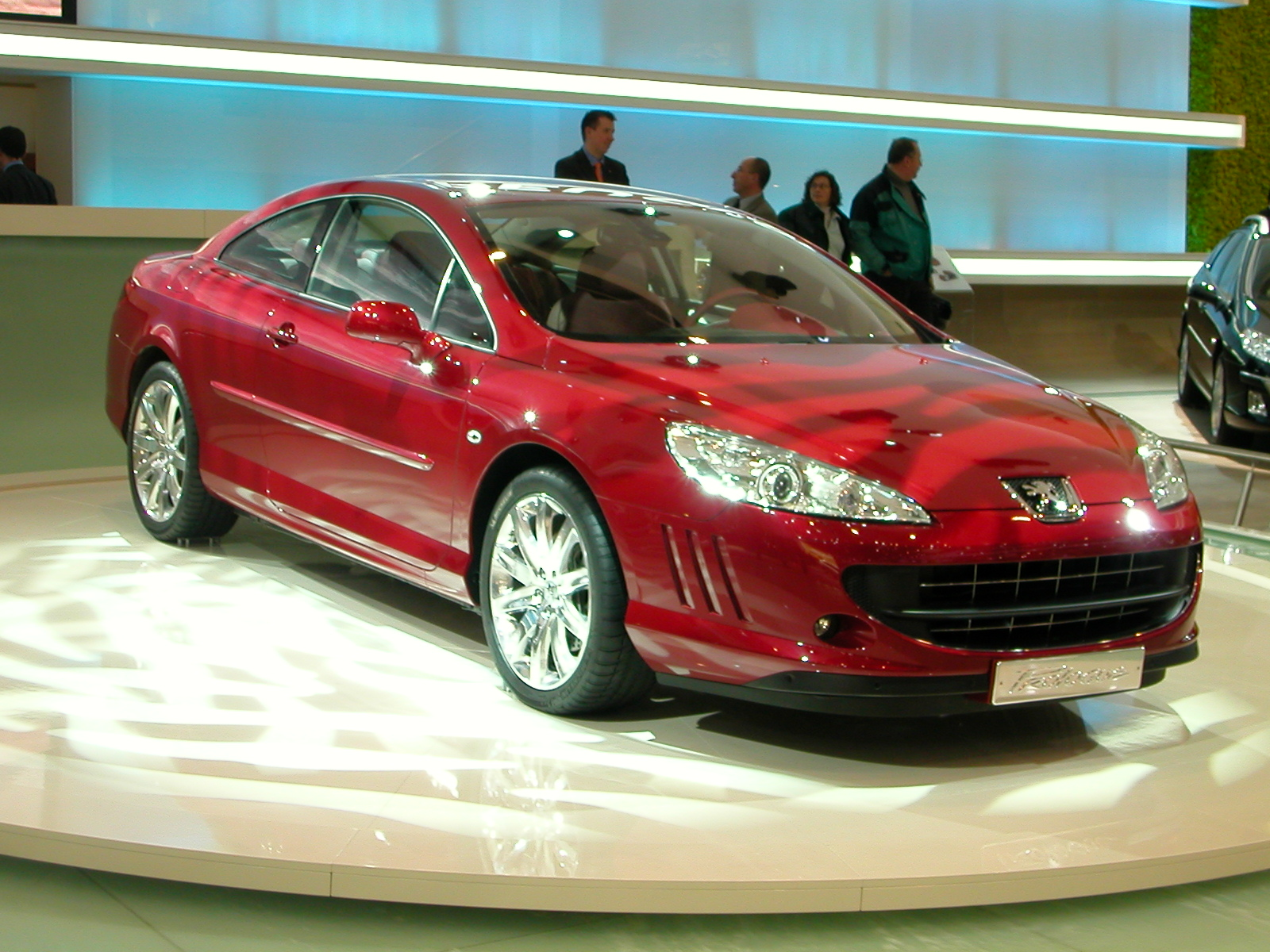
Peugeot 407 Prologue Concept

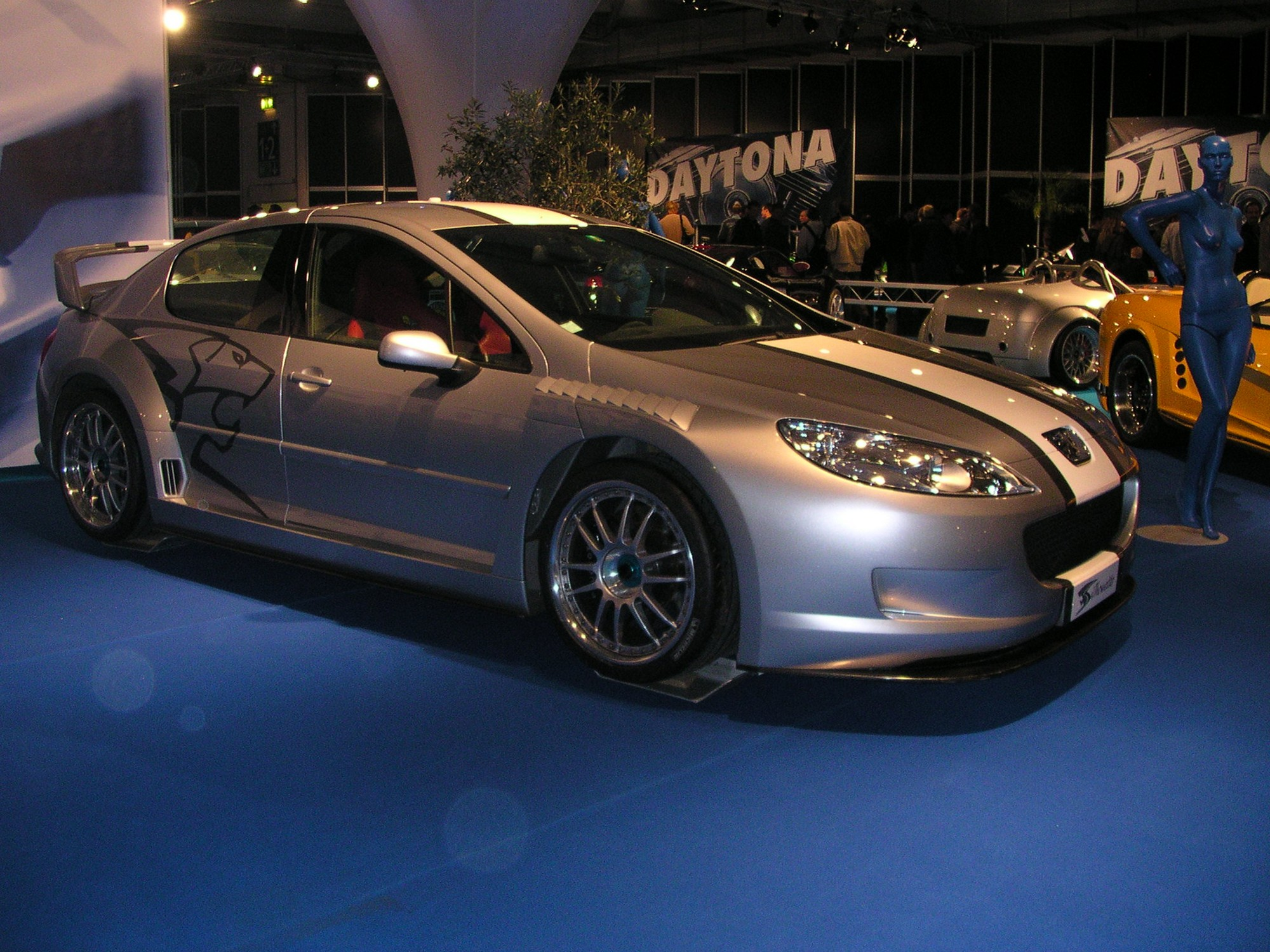
Peugeot 407 Silhouette Concept

The saloon version of the 407 was first previewed, with the name "407 Elixir", at the 2003 Frankfurt Motor Show. The "407 Silhouette" is a race car, with most design features of the coupé. A version, almost identical to the released coupé, was presented at the 2005 Geneva Motor Show, under the name "407 Prologue". The "407 Macarena" is the four-door coupé convertible, produced by Heuliez, and was presented at the 2006 Geneva Motor Show.

=== Notable film appearances ===
The 407 sedan appeared in the comedy film Taxi 4 from 2007 and the film Taxi 5 from 2018. The previous films in the series had its predecessor, the 406.

=== Successor ===
Philippe Varin, from PSA, announced in November 2010 that the successor of the Peugeot 407 would not be called the Peugeot 408, but instead the Peugeot 508. The 508 was officially launched at the Paris Motor Show in October 2010.

The saloon of the 508 was approximately 12 cm (5 inches) longer than the 407, and also replaced the larger Peugeot 607. The name Peugeot 408 was used for the Chinese built notchback version of the Peugeot 308, that replaced the 407 in South America.

== Sales ==
Year	Worldwide Production	Worldwide sales	Notes
2004	170,000	170,000	
2005	271,000	268,000	
2006	197,700	194,800	
2007	162,000	158,000	
2008	117,700	113,400	
2009	96,500	90,800	
2010	84,900	79,300	
2011	9,348	4,605	Total 407 production reaches 1.109.148 units.
