= Emma Wiklund =

Swedish actress and model

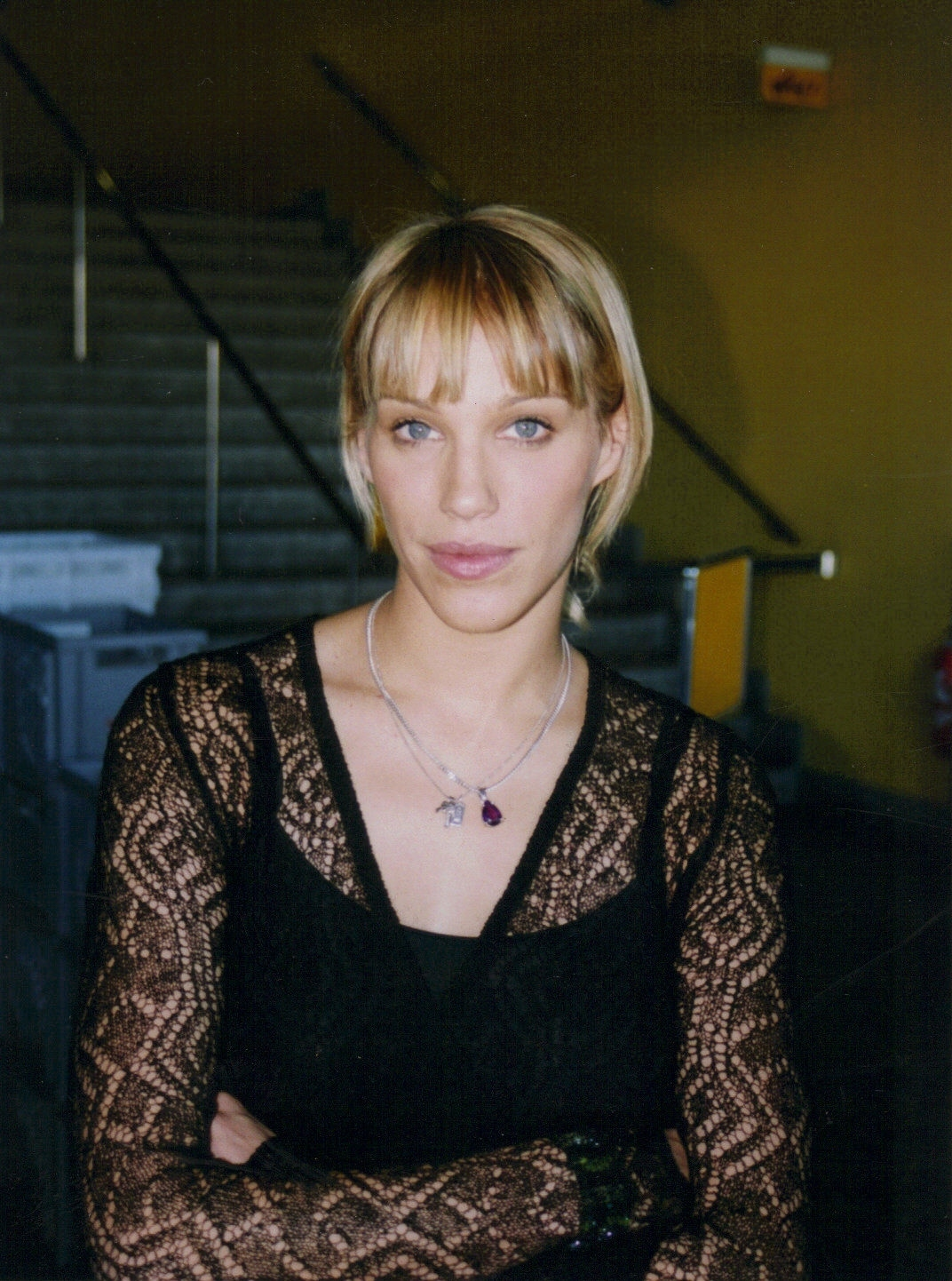
- Wiklund in 2002
- Born: Emma Sjöberg; 13 September 1968 (age 58); Stockholm, Sweden
- Spouse(s): Hans Wiklund (2003–present)
- Children: 2
- Modeling information
- Height: 1.77 m (5 ft 9 1/2 in)
- Hair color: Light brown
- Eye color: Blue

Emma Wiklund (née Sjöberg; 13 September 1968) is a Swedish fashion model and actress. She appeared on several covers of Elle magazine and in the 1992 George Michael music video for "Too Funky". Her acting roles include playing police officer Petra in four of the Taxi films (1998–2007). Considered to be one of the top models or supermodels of her time in 1990s, she worked with top models on the runways from Paris to Milan alongside fellow models like Tyra Banks and Cindy Crawford.

== Career ==
Born 13 September 1968 in Stockholm, Sweden, she is a 177 cm tall, blue-eyed blonde who has walked the runway for Versace, Dior, Thierry Mugler, Christian Lacroix and Lanvin. She was signed to Elite Model Management and can be seen in George Michael's music video for "Too Funky" alongside other models such as Linda Evangelista.

She dated Ulf Ekberg, songwriter for and co-founder of Ace of Base, from 1994 to 2000. She began her acting career in 1995, and role include playing police officer Petra with the four Taxi movies (1998–2007), she became a popular actress in France. In her native Sweden, she is known as a TV-hostess and a regular in the fashion world.

On 12 February 2003, she married Hans Wiklund and they have two children, daughter Tyra and son Elis. She sat on the board for Swedish fashion retailer Lindex in 2007. She also appears in their advertisements. Wiklund speaks German fluently.

== Filmography ==
- 1992 - Inferno (TV movie)
- 1995 - Inferno
- 1998 - Taxi, Petra
- 1999 - Simon Sez, The Dancer
- 2000 - Taxi 2, Petra
- 2000 - Petite copine (short)
- 2003 - Taxi 3, Petra
- 2004 - Big Kiss, Sonja
- 2007 - Taxi 4, Petra
