= Taxi 5 =

2018 French action comedy film

- Theatrical release poster
- Directed by: Franck Gastambide
- Written by: Franck Gastambide; Stéphane Kazandjian; Luc Besson
- Produced by: Luc Besson
- Starring: Franck Gastambide; Malik Bentalha; Sabrina Ouazani; Bernard Farcy; Salvatore Esposito
- Cinematography: Vincent Richard
- Edited by: Julien Rey
- Music by: DJ Kore; Charlie Nguyen Kim
- Production company: ARP Sélection
- Distributed by: EuropaCorp
- Release date: 11 April 2018
- Running time: 102 minutes
- Country: France
- Language: French
- Budget: $23 million
- Box office: $38.6 million

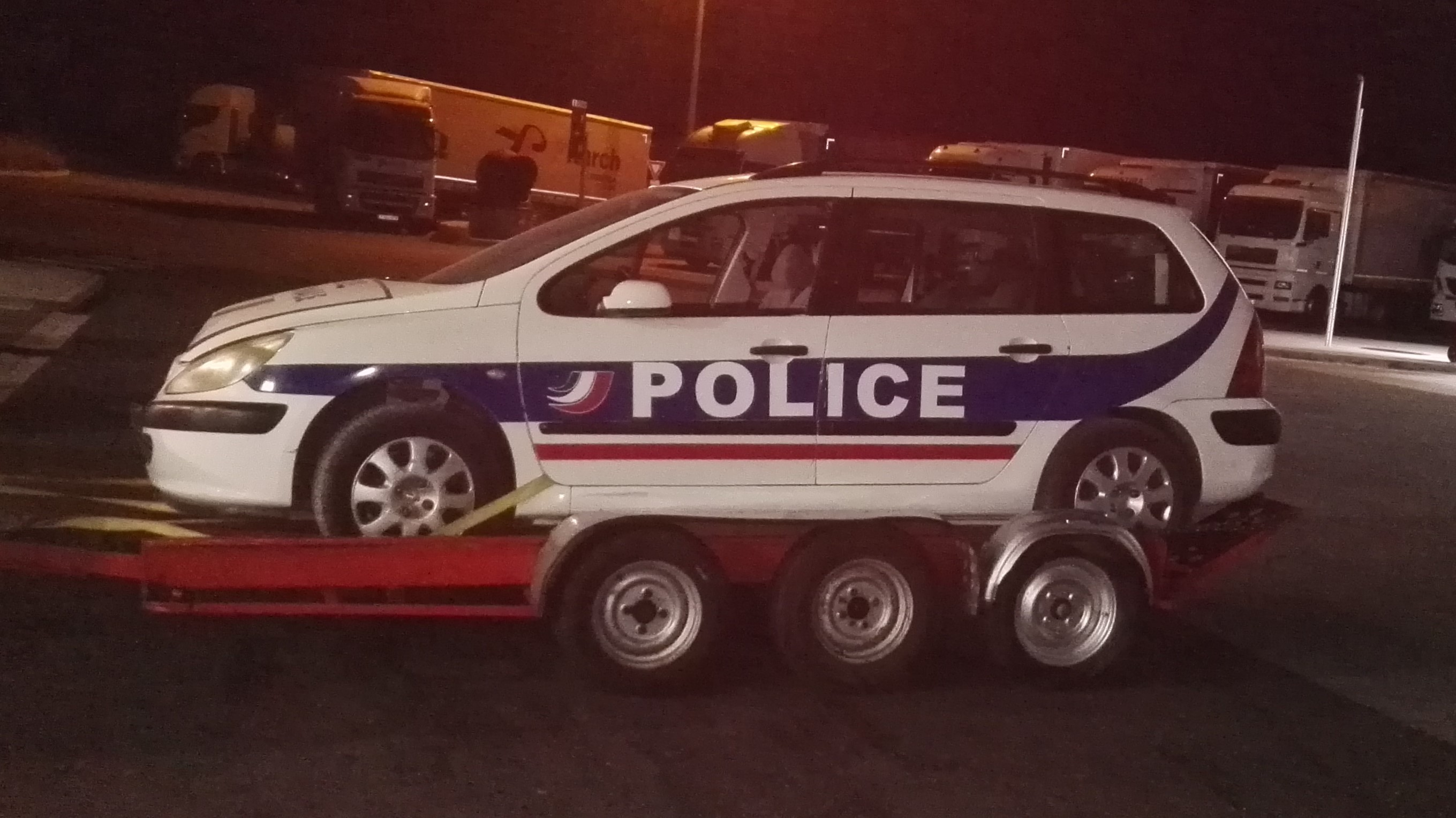
One Peugeot 307 used for filming. (November 2017)

Taxi 5 (French: Taxi Cinq) is a 2018 French action comedy film directed by Franck Gastambide. A sequel to Taxi 4 (2007), it is the fifth installment of the Taxi film series and features different characters.

== Plot ==
Sylvain Marot, inspector of the Paris police, is considered one of the best police officers in the French capital, who dreams of serving in the special forces. After it is found out that he slept with the Mayor's wife, he is transferred to the municipal police of Marseille, whose mayor is the former Commissaire Gibert. While chasing a taxi driver, he ends up drowning the patrol car and as a result enters into a skirmish with the city police.

Gibert informs the team about a "gang of Italians", who use two powerful Ferrari for committing their crimes, and instructs Marot to arrest them. Due to the local police cars being under-powered, he realizes he won't be able to keep up with a Ferrari. Alain, a colleague of Marot, tells the newcomer about the legendary taxi of Marseille and about the adventures of Daniel and Emilien.

But years have passed: the car is now in Morocco, Emilien has left the police, and Daniel lives in Miami. Sylvain and his team find Daniel's nephew, Eddie Makhlouf, who was the taxi driver he was chasing. Sylvain offers Eddie a deal; find his uncle's taxi, and he will be set free.

Eddie makes a counter-offer, stating that he wishes to be the driver of the taxi when they find it. They find the car, but it turns out that the nephew does not have the talent of his uncle. The next day, they begin operation "Mafia", as named by Gibert. As the thieves are escaping, Gibert makes a mistake leading to a car pile-up, one of the victims of which is revealed to be the Minister he had met previously.

Sylvain chases after the thieves, but is still unable to keep up with their cars. Realizing that the car needs more modifications, he ends up leaving the taxi with Eddie's sister, Samia. Sylvain is immediately smitten by her and tries to make a move but is turned down. He goes with Eddie to meet an "Italian" Rashid, who informs them about a place where the Italians train - an abandoned racing track. Sylvain and Eddie go there and win the race. One of the robbers, Tony Dog, a former driver for Formula 1, offers Sylvain a job and invites him to a private party.

The entire municipal police team is sent there. Eddie, disguised as a waiter, enters Dog's office and finds the plan for the next robbery - the theft of a diamond "Cassiopeia". He shows Sylvain the evidence, but when they hear someone coming, they try to hide in the room. Both overhear the robbers speaking to two corrupt city cops. Because of Eddie's stupidity, they get caught and Eddie ends up revealing everything to one of them. After Sylvain escapes through the window, Eddie is rescued by one of the police officers.

On the day of the robbery, the diamond "Cassiopeia" arrives in Marseille by helicopter. Before it can land, the robbers threaten to blow it up using a stolen military drone. After blowing up a couple of police cars as proof, the pilot is forced to fly the helicopter to a yacht. Sylvain and Eddie chase after the helicopter along with the cops.

The corrupt cops are stopped by Eddie's friends while clearing a path for the taxi. The cops commandeer a civilian vehicle, but they eventually get stopped by the municipal police while the robbers continue their pursuit of the taxi. After opening fire on the taxi, Sylvain uses the boost to gain more speed and as a result the taxi is sent flying off a cliff and crashing into the back of the yacht where Rashid has already claimed the diamond from the pilot.

The gang is then arrested, and the diamond is returned. Sylvain heads over to Samia to tell her about the car, when she reveals that it's already over the news. Eddie is shown on television pretending to be a cop while taking credit. He thanks Sylvain and Samia before ending it with a proposal to his girlfriend. In the hospital, Alain, seeing the broken taxi, is upset. Later at a ceremony, everyone involved is awarded.

Sylvain arrives in a Lamborghini confiscated from the Italians, followed by Samia in a new car she had been working on. Both then proceed to race to the airport.

== Cast ==
- Franck Gastambide: Sylvain Marot
- Malik Bentalha: Eddy Maklouf
- Bernard Farcy: Gérard Gilbert
- Salvatore Esposito: Toni Dog
- Edouard Montoute: Alain Trésor
- Sabrina Ouazani: Samia
- Sand Van Roy: Sandy
- Anouar Toubali: Michel Petrucciani
- Monsieur Poulpe: Ménard
- Sissi Duparc: Sandrine Brossard
- Ramzy Bedia: Rachid
- Moussa Maaskri: Lopez
- Soprano: Baba
- Elise Larnicol: Minister of Ecology
- François Levantal: Commissaire Morzini

== Reception ==
Taxi 5 was universally panned by critics and audiences, and is often considered to be the worst entry of the series. On the review aggregator website Rotten Tomatoes, 0% of 5 critics' reviews are positive, with an average rating of 2/10.

== Future ==
In an interview with "50 Minutes Inside", Franck Gastambide announced that if Taxi 5 pays off well at the box office, then Taxi 6 will be his next job. The film failed at the box office with a budget of €20.39 million, raising only $35 million. Despite this, the director still plans to make the sixth film.

In an interview with the Premiere newspaper, Samy Naceri said that he was ready to star in Taxi 6 if Luc Besson "assembled the old team", he refused to only appear as a cameo.

At the Dinar Film Festival of 2018, Sabrina Ouazani confirmed that the sixth film is still in planning stage, further details are currently unknown.
