= The Code (2002 film) =

- French theatrical release poster
- Directed by: Manuel Boursinhac
- Produced by: Alain Goldman
- Starring: Samuel Le Bihan; Samy Naceri
- Cinematography: Kevin Jewison
- Edited by: Hélène de Luze
- Music by: Titi Robin
- Production companies: Gaumont; Légende Entreprises
- Distributed by: Gaumont Buena Vista International(France); Columbia TriStar Film Distributors International (Worldwide)
- Release date: 23 October 2002
- Running time: 116 minutes
- Country: France
- Language: French
- Budget: $8.8 million
- Box office: $1.6 million

The Code (French: La Mentale) is a 2002 French action film directed by Manuel Boursinhac.

== Cast ==
- Samuel Le Bihan as Dris
- Samy Naceri as Yanis
- Clotilde Courau as Nina
- Marie Guillard as Lise
- Michel Duchaussoy as Fèche
- Philippe Nahon as Simon
- Francis Renaud as Niglo
- Lucien Jean-Baptiste as Foued
- Bibi Naceri as Rouquin
- Stéphane Ferrara as Prosper
- Édith Scob as Mireille
- Élisabeth Margoni as Evelyne
- Samir Guesmi as Daniel
- François Berléand as The man in contract with Yanis (uncredited)
