= Sand Van Roy =

Dutch actress

- Born: Heerlen, Netherlands
- Occupations: Actress; writer
- Years active: 2007–present

Sand Van Roy is a Dutch actress and advocate for victims of sexual violence.

Born in Heerlen, Netherlands, daughter of two general practitioners, she moved to Paris at the age of 17. She worked as a model before turning to comedy.

Practising stand-up, she opened for Mathieu Madénian and Gad Elmaleh. She was involved in the launch of Funny Bones, an English language YouTube channel. She since appeared in supporting roles in two EuropaCorp productions.

== Luc Besson case ==
In May 2018, during a period marked by the Harvey Weinstein case, she filed a complaint against Luc Besson for rape; Luc Besson's lawyer, Thierry Marembert, stated that the director "still denies the charges brought against him". Legal proceedings later acquitted Besson.

In April 2021, the Mail Online recognized that publishing three articles in 2018 and 2019 revealing Sand Van Roy’s name and complaint against Luc Besson was a breach of her privacy. They also recognized that she never mentioned being drugged. They "offered to pay compensation and legal costs, and apologized to her for the distress caused."

== Activism ==
In May 2019, she protested the Cannes Film Festival's Palme d'honneur being given to Alain Delon by walking the red carpet with a temporary tattoo that read "Stop violence against women".

In 2020, Van Roy became an ambassador of the foundation Stichting Cassandra, which defends the interests of victims of sexual and psychological violence.

== Filmography ==
- 2016 : Virgin by Nath Dumont: Kira
- 2017 : Valerian and the City of a Thousand Planets by Luc Besson
- 2018 : Taxi 5 by Franck Gastambide: Sandy
- 2018 : Genius Picasso: Florelle
- 2019 : Indulgence by Sergio Fabio Ferrari: Amanda
- 2020 : A (K)Night in Paris (short), by Franck Galiègue: Pamela Isley
