= Taxi 4 =

- Theatrical release poster
- Directed by: Gérard Krawczyk
- Written by: Luc Besson
- Produced by: Luc Besson; Laurent Pétin; Michèle Pétin
- Starring: Samy Naceri; Frédéric Diefenthal; Bernard Farcy; Jean-Christophe Bouvet; Edouard Montoute; Emma Sjöberg-Wiklund; Djibril Cissé; François Damiens; Jean-Luc Couchard
- Cinematography: Pierre Morel
- Edited by: Christine Lucas Navarro
- Music by: Romaric Laurence; Maste; Damien Roques (Da Octopusss); Tefa; Weallstar
- Production company: ARP Sélection
- Distributed by: EuropaCorp
- Release date: 10 February 2007
- Running time: 91 minutes Director's Cut - 97 minutes
- Country: France
- Language: French
- Budget: $17.5 million
- Box office: $65.1 million

Taxi 4 (stylized on-screen as T4Xi; French: Taxi Quatre) is a 2007 French action comedy film directed by Gérard Krawczyk and the fourth installment of the Taxi film series. It is a sequel to Taxi 3 (2003) and followed by Taxi 5 (2018). As with all the previous films in the Taxi franchise, Samy Naceri plays taxi driver Daniel Morales, this time in a Peugeot 407, unlike the 406 in the previous films. Frédéric Diefenthal is Émilien Coutant-Kerbalec, whilst Jean-Christophe Bouvet reprises his role as General Bertineau yet again.

The film also features French footballer Djibril Cissé.

== Plot ==
A Belgian criminal, wanted all over Europe for his crimes, is in the custody of the Police Department of Marseille to be watched for a few hours before transfer to a prison in the Congo. His accomplice sneaks in to the police station and changes the database image of the criminal with the unknowing help of Daniel and Émilien's sons. Émilien (Frédéric Diefenthal) is tricked by the villain and convinced to let the prisoner go when Commissioner Gilbert knocks himself out with a sleeping dart gun while interrogating him.

After these events, he is fired, but luckily for him, his friend Daniel (Samy Naceri) helps him one more time by telling him the location where the criminal is located, having been the taxi driver who drove him after he left the police station, not knowing he was a criminal. Petra is recruited in a secret mission to make use of the criminal and retrieve documents from the bank vaults he robs. With Daniel's skills and his new Peugeot 407, Émilien seeks to capture the criminal to restore his job back.

== Cast ==
- Samy Naceri as Daniel Morales
- Frédéric Diefenthal as Émilien Coutant-Kerbalec
- Bernard Farcy as Commissaire Gibert
- Jean-Christophe Bouvet as Général Edmond Bertineau
- Edouard Montoute as Alain
- Emma Sjöberg-Wiklund as Petra
- Djibril Cissé as himself
- François Damiens as Serge
- Jean-Luc Couchard as Le Belge
- Henri Cohen as the banker

== Reception ==
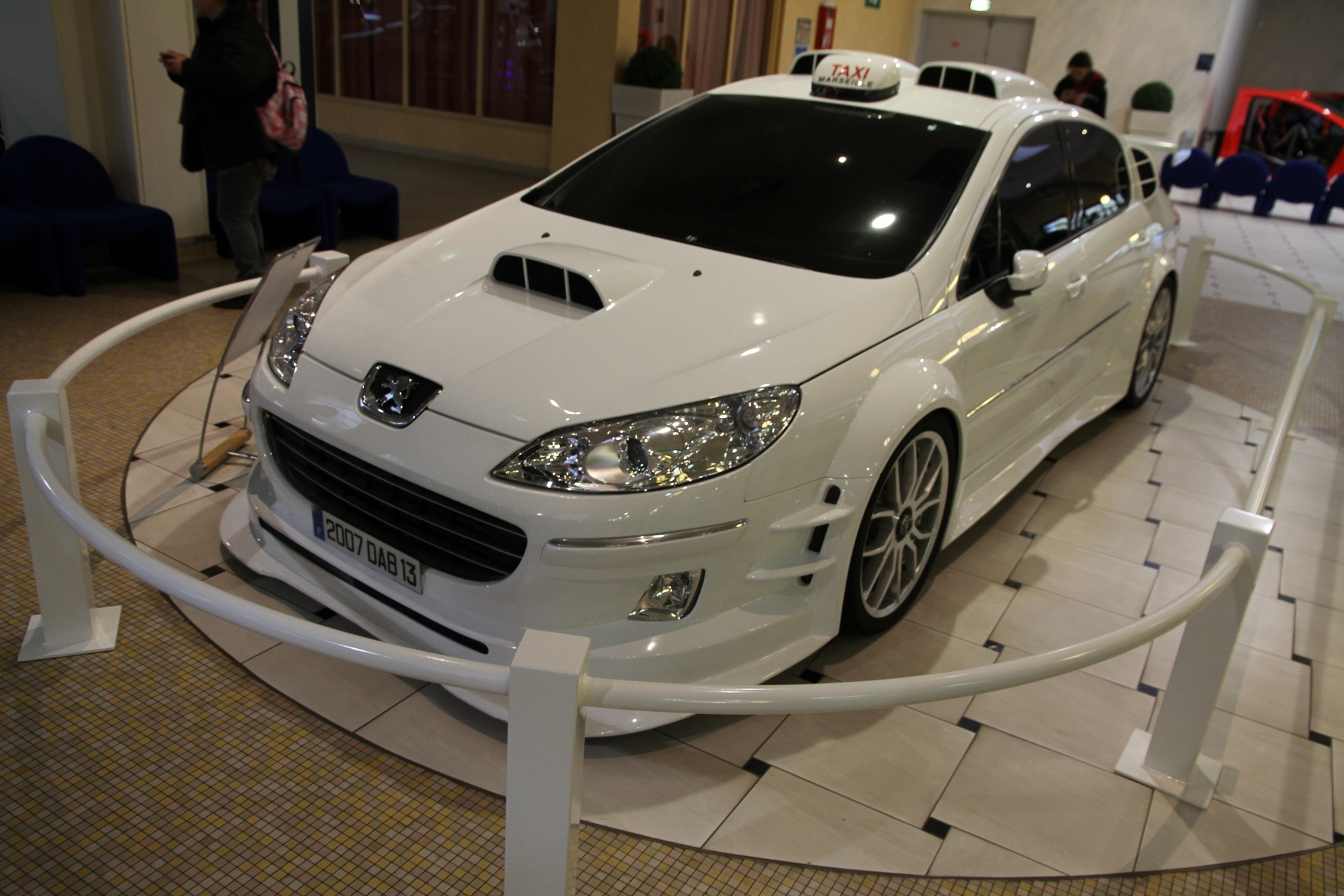
Peugeot 407

=== Box office ===
On the opening day, 450,000 people attended in France, with 43,000 in Paris alone. T4xi's Canadian premiere was at the Just for Laughs Comedia Film Festival on 22 July 2007, a week before a wide release.

== Sequel ==
A sequel titled Taxi 5, was released in 2018.
