= Frédéric Diefenthal =

French actor and director (born 1968)

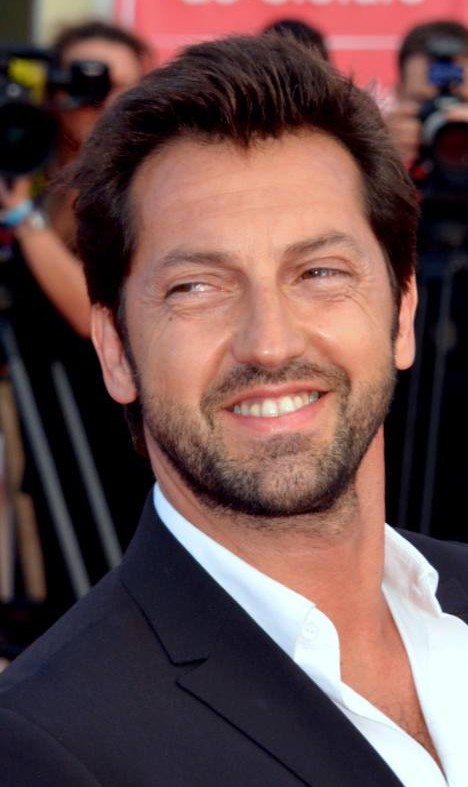
- Frédéric Diefenthal in June 2015 at Cabourg Film Festival
- Born: 26 July 1968 (age 57); Saint-Mandé, France
- Occupation: Actor
- Spouse: Gwendoline Hamon (2004–2014)

Frédéric Diefenthal (born 26 July 1968 in Saint-Mandé) is a French actor and director.

== Biography ==
Diefenthal grew up in Saint-Puy in southwestern France. He is Jewish. Prior to acting, Diefenthal pursued apprenticeships in the hotel industry, hairdressing, was also an apprentice pastry chef. He began studies in architecture before switching to drama. Diefenthal began acting in the early 1990s; he held a main role in the French television series Le juge est une femme (The Judge is a Woman), where he first gained a degree of notoriety. He also played a major part in the French Taxi series.

Diefenthal was previously married to actress Gwendoline Hamon, with whom he has a son. The pair separated in 2014.

== Filmography ==
Year	Title	Role	Notes
1998	Taxi	Émilien Coutant-Kerbalec	
2000	Taxi 2	Émilien Coutant-Kerbalec	
2001	Belphegor, Phantom of the Louvre	Martin	
2001	Savage Souls	Firmin	
2002	A Private Affair	The Transvestite	
2003	Taxi 3	Émilien Coutant-Kerbalec	
2004	L'Incruste	Alexandre	
2005	Clara Sheller	JP	
2005	Renart the Fox	Renart	
2007	Taxi 4	Émilien Coutant-Kerbalec	
2017	The Forest	Vincent Musso	
2018	Caïn	Renaud Maurin	Episode: Jardin secret
