= Gérard Krawczyk =

French film director

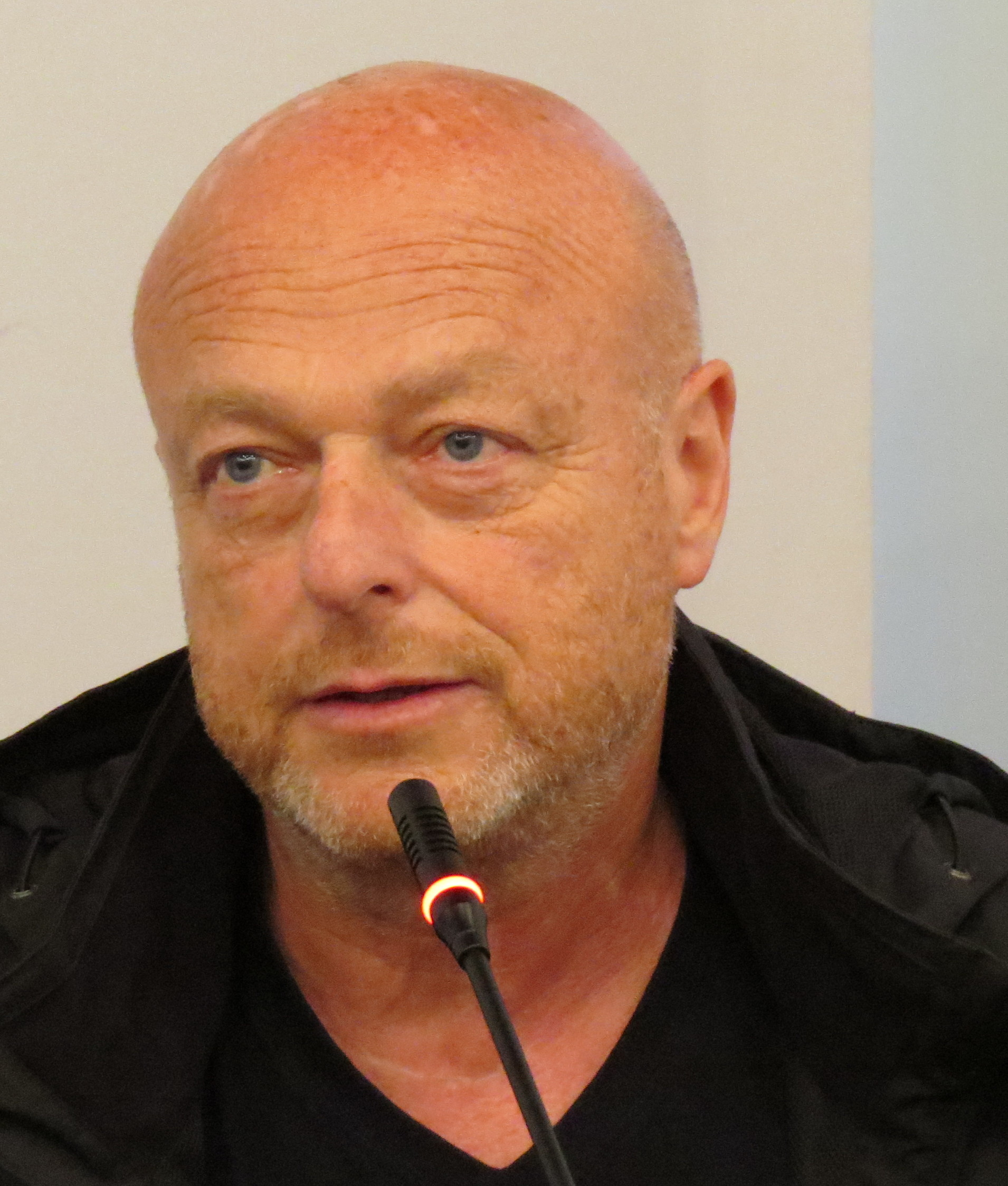
Gérard Krawczyk

Gérard Krawczyk (17 May 1953, Paris) is a French film director. He is of Polish descent (his grandparents were from Częstochowa).

== Filmography ==
=== Director ===
- Homicide by Night (1984)
- Je hais les acteurs (a.k.a. I hate actors) (1986)
- L'été en pente douce (1987)
- Taxi 2 (2000)
- Wasabi (2001)
- Taxi 3 (2003)
- Fanfan la tulipe (2003)
- La vie est à nous ! (2005)
- Taxi 4 (2007)
- L'Auberge rouge (2007)

=== Actor ===
- Papillon du vertige (1987)
- XY, drôle de conception (1996) - L'homme spermogramme #2
- Amour et confusions (1997)
- Héroïnes (1997) - Médecin
- The Messenger: The Story of Joan of Arc (1999) - Church's Peer - Coronation
- Taxi 3 (2003) - Policier Camionnette #2
- La vie est à nous ! (2005) - Un client du bar
- A French Gigolo (2008) - Le patron du bistrot
- Valerian and the City of a Thousand Planets (2017) - Captain Welcoming Martapuraïs

== Decorations ==
- Chevalier of the Order of Arts and Letters (2016)
