= Gérard Pirès =

French film director and writer (born 1942)

Gérard Pirès (born 31 August 1942) is a French film director and writer.

== Filmography ==
- Guo bao zong dong yuan (Adventures in the NPM) (2007)
- Les Chevaliers du ciel (Sky Fighters) (2005)
- Double Zéro (2004)
- Steal (2002)
- Taxi (1998)
- De Serge Gainsbourg à Gainsbarre de 1958 - 1991 (1994) (V) (segment "Monsieur William" 1968)
- Rends-moi la clé! (1981)
- L'Entourloupe (The Swindle) (1980)
- L'Ordinateur des pompes funèbres (The Probability Factor a.k.a. The Undertaker Parlor Computer) (1976)
- Attention les yeux! (Let's Make a Dirty Movie) (1976)
- L'Agression (Act of Aggression) (1975)
- Elle court, elle court la banlieue (The Suburbs Are Everywhere) (1973)
- Fantasia chez les ploucs (Fantasia Among the Squares) (1971)
- L'Art de la turlute (1969)
- Fête des mères, La (1969) (short)
- S.W.B. (1969) (short)
- Erotissimo (1968)
- Je ne sais pas (1966) (short)
