= 2007 Cannes Film Festival =

- Official poster by Alex Majoli
- Opening film: My Blueberry Nights
- Closing film: Days of Darkness
- Location: Cannes, France
- Founded: 1946
- Awards: Palme d'Or: 4 Months, 3 Weeks and 2 Days
- Hosted by: Diane Kruger
- No. of films: 22 (Main Competition)
- Festival date: 16 May 2007 – 27 May 2007
- Website: festival-cannes.com/en

Cannes Film Festival
- 2008 2006

The 60th Cannes Film Festival was held from 16 to 27 May 2007. British filmmaker Stephen Frears served as jury president for the main competition. Romanian filmmaker Cristian Mungiu won the Palme d'Or for the drama film 4 Months, 3 Weeks and 2 Days.

The official poster featured Pedro Almodóvar, Juliette Binoche, Jane Campion, Souleymane Cissé, Penélope Cruz, Gérard Depardieu, Samuel L. Jackson, Bruce Willis and Wong Kar-wai, all photographed by Alex Majoli, as a commemoration of the 60th festival edition.

The festival opened with My Blueberry Nights by Wong Kar-wai, and closed with Days of Darkness by Denys Arcand. German actress Diane Kruger was the mistress of ceremonies.

Un Certain Regard poster by Italian comics artist Enrico Marini.

== Juries ==
=== Main Competition ===
- Stephen Frears, British director - Jury President
- Marco Bellocchio, Italian director
- Maggie Cheung, Hong Kong actress
- Toni Collette, Australian actress
- Maria de Medeiros, Portuguese actress
- Orhan Pamuk, Turkish Nobel Prize laureate novelist
- Michel Piccoli, French actor
- Sarah Polley, Canadian actress and director
- Abderrahmane Sissako, Mauritanian filmmaker

=== Un Certain Regard ===
- Pascale Ferran, French director - Jury President
- Kent Jones, American writer
- Cristi Puiu, Romanian director
- Bian Qin, Chinese writer
- Jasmine Trinca, Italian actress

=== Cinéfondation and Short Films Competition ===
- Jia Zhangke, Chinese director - Jury President
- Niki Karimi, Iranian actress and filmmaker
- J. M. G. Le Clézio, French writer
- Dominik Moll, German director
- Deborah Nadoolman, American costume designer

=== Caméra d'Or ===
- Pavel Lungin, Russian writer, director - Jury President
- Renato Berta, Swiss cinematographer
- Julie Bertuccelli, French director
- Clotilde Courau, French actress

== Official Selection ==
=== In Competition ===
The following feature films competed for the Palme d'Or:

English title	Original title	Director(s)	Production Country
4 Months, 3 Weeks and 2 Days	4 luni, 3 săptămâni şi 2 zile	Cristian Mungiu	Romania
Aleksandra	Александра	Alexander Sokurov	Russia
The Banishment	Изгнание	Andrey Zvyagintsev	Russia
Breath	숨	Kim Ki-duk	South Korea
Death Proof		Quentin Tarantino	United States
The Diving Bell and the Butterfly	Le scaphandre et le papillon	Julian Schnabel	France, United States
The Edge of Heaven	Auf der anderen Seite	Fatih Akin	Germany, Turkey
Import/Export		Ulrich Seidl	Austria
The Last Mistress	Une vieille maîtresse	Catherine Breillat	France, Italy
Love Songs	Les chansons d'amour	Christophe Honoré	France
The Man from London	A londoni férfi	Béla Tarr	Hungary, France, Germany
The Mourning Forest	殯の森	Naomi Kawase	Japan
My Blueberry Nights (opening film)		Wong Kar-wai	China, France, Hong Kong, United States
No Country for Old Men		Joel and Ethan Coen	United States
Paranoid Park		Gus Van Sant	United States, France
Persepolis		Marjane Satrapi and Vincent Paronnaud	France, Iran
Promise Me This	Завет	Emir Kusturica	Serbia
Secret Sunshine	밀양	Lee Chang-dong	South Korea
Silent Light	Stellet licht	Carlos Reygadas	Mexico, France, Netherlands, Germany
Tehilim		Raphaël Nadjari	Israel, France
We Own the Night		James Gray	United States
Zodiac		David Fincher	United States

=== Un Certain Regard ===
The following films were selected for the competition of Un Certain Regard:

English title	Original title	Director(s)	Production Country
Actrices		Valeria Bruni Tedeschi	France
And Along Come Tourists	Am Ende kommen Touristen	Robert Thalheim	Germany
The Band's Visit	ביקור התזמורת	Eran Kolirin	Israel, France, United States
Blind Mountain	盲山	Li Yang	China
California Dreamin' (endless)	California Dreamin' (nesfârșit)	Cristian Nemescu	Romania
Calle Santa Fe		Carmen Castillo	Chile
Et toi, t'es sur qui?		Lola Doillon	France
Flight of the Red Balloon	Le voyage du ballon rouge	Hou Hsiao-hsien	France, Taiwan
Magnus		Kadri Kõusaar	Estonia, United Kingdom
My Brother Is an Only Child	Mio fratello è figlio unico	Daniele Luchetti	Italy
Mister Lonely		Harmony Korine	United Kingdom, France, Ireland, United States
Munyurangabo		Lee Isaac Chung	Rwanda, United States
Night Train	夜車	Diao Yinan	China
Pleasure Factory	快乐工厂	Ekachai Uekrongtham	Singapore, Thailand
The Pope's Toilet	El Baño del Papa	Enrique Fernandez and César Charlone	Uruguay, Brazil, France
Solitary Fragments	La soledad	Jaime Rosales	Spain
A Stray Girlfriend	Una novia errante	Ana Katz	Argentina
Terror's Advocate	L'Avocat de la terreur	Barbet Schroeder	France
Water Lilies	Naissance des Pieuvres	Céline Sciamma	France
You, the Living	Du levande	Roy Andersson	Sweden, France, Denmark, Germany, Norway

=== Out of Competition ===
The following films were selected to be screened out of competition:

English title	Original title	Director(s)	Production Country
Boarding Gate		Olivier Assayas	France, Luxembourg
Days of Darkness (closing film)	L'Âge des ténèbres	Denys Arcand	Canada, France
Go Go Tales		Abel Ferrara	United States, Italy
A Mighty Heart		Michael Winterbottom	United States, United Kingdom
Ocean's Thirteen		Steven Soderbergh	United States
Sicko		Michael Moore	United States
To Each His Own Cinema	Chacun son cinéma: une déclaration d'amour au grand écran	Various directors (Note: Raymond Depardon, Takeshi Kitano, Theo Angelopoulos, Andrei Konchalovsky, Nanni Moretti, Hou Hsiao-hsien, Jean-Pierre and Luc Dardenne, Joel and Ethan Coen, Alejandro González Iñárritu, Zhang Yimou, Amos Gitai, Jane Campion, Atom Egoyan, Aki Kaurismäki, Olivier Assayas, Youssef Chahine, Tsai Ming-liang, Lars von Trier, Raoul Ruiz, Claude Lelouch, Gus Van Sant, Roman Polanski, Michael Cimino, David Cronenberg, Wong Kar-wai, Abbas Kiarostami, Bille August, Elia Suleiman, Manoel de Oliveira, Walter Salles, Wim Wenders, Chen Kaige, Ken Loach, David Lynch)	France
Triangle	铁三角	Ringo Lam, Johnny To and Tsui Hark	Hong Kong, China
U2 3D		Catherine Owens and Mark Pellington	United States

=== Special Screenings ===
The following films were selected to receive a Special Screening.

English title	Original title	Director(s)	Production Country
11th Hour		Nadia Conners and Leila Conners Petersen	United States
Boxes	Les Boites	Jane Birkin	France
Crossed Tracks	Roman de Gare	Claude Lelouch	France
Cruising (1980)		William Friedkin	United States, West Germany
Fengming, a Chinese Memoir	和鳳鳴	Wang Bing	China, Hong Kog, Belgium
One Hundred Nails	Centochiodi	Ermanno Olmi	Italy
Rebellion: The Litvinenko Case	Бунт: Де́ло Литвине́нко	Andrei Nekrasov	Russia
Retour en Normandie		Nicolas Philibert	France
Summer of '62	Cartouches gauloises	Mehdi Charef	France
Ulzhan		Volker Schlöndorff	France, Germany, Kazakhstan
The War (7 episodes)		Ken Burns and Lynn Novick	United States
Young Yakuza		Jean-Pierre Limosin	France, United States, Japan

=== Cinéfondation ===
The following short films were selected for the competition of Cinéfondation:

- A Reunion by Sung-Hoon Hong
- Aditi singh by Mickael Kummer
- Ahora todos parecen contentos by Gonzalo Tobal
- Berachel bitha haktana by Efrat Corem
- Chinese Whispers by Raka Dutta
- For the Love of God by Joe Tucker
- Goyta by Joanna Jurewicz
- Halbe Stunden by Nicolas Wackerbarth
- Minus by Pavle Vuckovic
- Mish'olim by Hagar Ben-Asher
- Neostorozhnost by Alexander Kugel
- Rondo by Marja Mikkonen
- Ru Dao by Tao Chen
- Saba by Thereza Menezes, Gregorio Graziosi
- Triple 8 Palace by Alexander Ku
- Vita di Giacomo by Luca Governatori

=== Short film Competition ===
The following short films competed for the Short Film Palme d'Or:

English title	Original title	Director(s)	Production Country
Ah Ma	阿嬤	Anthony Chen	Singapore
Ark		Grzegorz Jonkajtys	Poland
In the Name of the Sparrow	Gia to onoma tou spourgitiou	Kyros Papavassiliou	Cyprus, Greece
The Last 15		Antonio Campos	United States
Looking Glass	Spegelbarn	Erik Rosenlund	Sweden
My Dear Rosseta		Hae-hoon Yang	South Korea
My Sister	Het zusje	Marco van Geffen	Netherlands
The Oates' Valor		Tim Thaddeus Cahill	United States
Run		Mark Albiston	New Zealand
Shock Resistant	Resistance aux tremblements	Olivier Hems	France
Ver Llover		Elisa Miller	Mexico

=== Cannes Classics ===
The section places the spotlight on restored prints from renowned filmmakers, alongside a selection of documentaries about cinema. The following film were selected to be screened:

English title	Original title	Director(s)	Production Country
Restored prints
The Adventures of Prince Achmed (1926)	Die Abenteuer des Prinzen Achmed	Lotte Reiniger	Weimar Germany
La Bandera (1935)		Julien Duvivier	France
Dracula (1958)		Terence Fisher	United Kingdom
Forest of the Hanged (1964)	Pădurea Spânzuraților	Liviu Ciulei	Romania
Hondo (1953)		John Farrow	United States
Made In Jamaica (2006)		Jérôme Laperrousaz	France, United States
The Memorial Gate for Virtuous Women (1962)	열녀문	Shin Sang-Ok	South Korea
Mikey and Nicky (1976)		Elaine May	United States
My Last Mistress (1943)	Donne-moi tes yeux	Sacha Guitry	France
Suspiria (1977)		Dario Argento	Italy
Twelve Angry Men (1957)		Sidney Lumet	United States
Words for Battle (short) (1941)		Humphrey Jennings	United Kingdom
Yo Yo (1965)	Yoyo	Pierre Etaix	France
Tributes
Hamlet (1948)		Laurence Olivier	United Kingdom
Kanał (1956)		Andrzej Wajda	Poland
Richard III (1955)		Laurence Olivier	United Kingdom
Henry V (1944)		Laurence Olivier	United Kingdom
Documentaries about Cinema
Brando		Mimi Freedman and Leslie Greif	United States
Lindsay Anderson, Never Apologize		Mike Kaplan	United States
Maurice Pialat, L'amour existe		Anne-Marie Faux and Jean-Pierre Devillers	France
Pierre Rissient		Todd McCarthy	United States

== Parallel Sections ==
=== International Critics' Week ===
The following films were screened for the 46th International Critics' Week (46e Semaine de la Critique):

English title	Original title	Director(s)	Production Country
In competition
Blue Eyelids	Párpados azules	Ernesto Contreras	Mexico
Funuke Show Some Love, You Losers!	腑抜けども、悲しみの愛を見せろ	Daihachi Yoshida	Japan
Inside	À l'intérieur	Julien Maury and Alexandre Bustillo	France
In the Arms of My Enemy	Voleurs de chevaux	Micha Wald	Belgium, France, Canada
In Your Wake	Nos retrouvailles	David Oelhoffen	France
Jellyfish	מדוזות	Etgar Keret and Shira Geffen	Israel, France
The Milky Way	A Via Láctea	Lina Chamie	Brazil
The Mugger	El Asaltante	Pablo Fendrik	Argentina
The Orphanage	El Orfanato	J. A. Bayona	Spain, Mexico
XXY		Lucia Puenzo	Argentina, France, Spain
Special Screenings
Bad Habits	Malos hábitos	Simón Bross	Mexico
Chambre 616		Frédéric Pelle	France
Déficit		Gael García Bernal	Mexico
Expired (closing film)		Cecilia Miniucchi	United States
Héros (opening film)		Bruno Merle	France
The Mosquito Problem and Other Stories	Проблемът с комарите и други истории	Andrey Paounov	Bulgaria, United States, Germany
Short Films Competition
Both		Bass Bre'che	United Kingdom, Lebanon
Fog		Peter Salmon	New Zealand
Madame Tutli-Putli		Chris Lavis and Maciek Szczerbowski	Canada
Rabbit Troubles	Лошият заек	Dimitar Mitovski and Kamen Kalev	Bulgaria
La Route, la nuit		Marine Alice le Du	France
Saliva		Esmir Filho	Brazil
A Stem	Um ramo	Juliana Rojas and Marco Dutra	Brazil
Special Screenings - Short Films
Primrose Hill		Mikhaël Hers	France
Situation Frank		Patrik Eklund	Sweden

=== Directors' Fortnight ===
The following films were screened for the 2007 Directors' Fortnight (Quinzaine des Réalizateurs):

- After Him (Après lui) by Gaël Morel (France)
- Avant que j'oublie by Jacques Nolot (France)
- Caramel by Nadine Labaki (Lebanon, France)
- Chop Shop by Ramin Bahrani (United States)
- Control by Anton Corbijn (Hungary)
- Dai Nipponjin by Hitoshi Matsumoto (Japan)
- Foster Child (John John) by Brillante Mendoza (Philippines)
- Her Name Is Sabine (Elle s'appelle Sabine) by Sandrine Bonnaire (France)
- Garage by Lenny Abrahamson (Ireland)
- L'état du monde by Chantal Akerman (Belgium), Apichatpong Weerasethakul (Thailand), Vicente Ferraz (Brazil), Ayisha Abraham (India), Wang Bing (China), Pedro Costa (Portugal)
- Counterparts (L'un contre l'autre) by Jan Bonny (Germany)
- La France by Serge Bozon (France)
- La Question humaine by Nicolas Klotz (France)
- La Influencia by Pedro Aguilera (Mexico)
- Mutum by Sandra Kogut (Brazil, France)
- Ploy by Pen-ek Ratanaruang (Thailand)
- PVC-1 by Spiros Stathoulopoulos (Colombia)
- Savage Grace by Tom Kalin (United States, France, Spain)
- Smiley Face by Gregg Araki (United States, Germany)
- Tout est pardonné by Mia Hansen-Løve (France)
- Un homme perdu by Danielle Arbid (Lebanon, France)
- Yumurta by Semih Kaplanoglu (Turkey, Greece)
- Zoo by Robinson Devor (United States)

== Tous Les Cinemas du Monde ==
Tous Les Cinemas du Monde (World Cinema) began in 2005 to showcase films from a variety of different countries. From 19 May to 25 May 2007, films were screened from India, Lebanon, Poland, Kenya, Guinea, Angola, Slovenia, and Colombia.

=== India ===
The first two days of this program held during 19 May to 25 May 2007 featured special screening of Indian films; Saira (2005), Missed Call (2005), Lage Raho Munna Bhai (2006), Dosar (2006), Veyil, (2006), Guru (2007), Dhan Dhana Dhan Goal (2007), and Dharm (2007).

=== Lebanon ===
Debuting at the Director's Fortnight was Nadine Labaki's Caramel, a charming dramedy about five women who gather at a beauty salon and deal with their everyday problems with men, social expectation, sexuality, and tradition vs. modernizing times. Labaki not only directed and co-wrote the film but plays the lead as well. The rest of the cast is composed mostly of unprofessional actors, all of whom deliver very convincing performances and add a lot of color and depth to the film. Reminiscent of a Pedro Almodóvar picture, Caramel is unique not just for its technical and creative sophistication but also for not tackling any of the religious, political, or war-related issues that have continued to plague its setting, Lebanon, til now. The film proved to be a sleeper at the festival and was distributed in well over 40 countries, becoming an international hit.

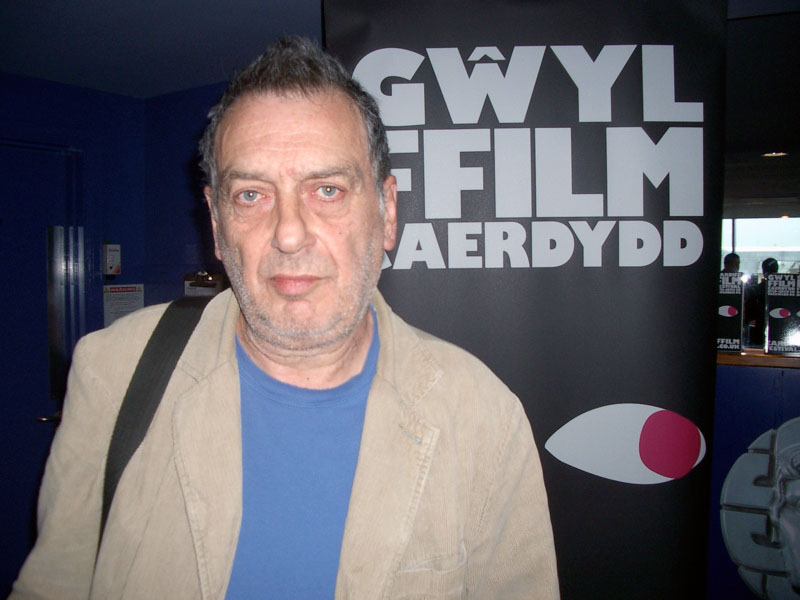
Stephen Frears, Jury President

== Official Awards ==
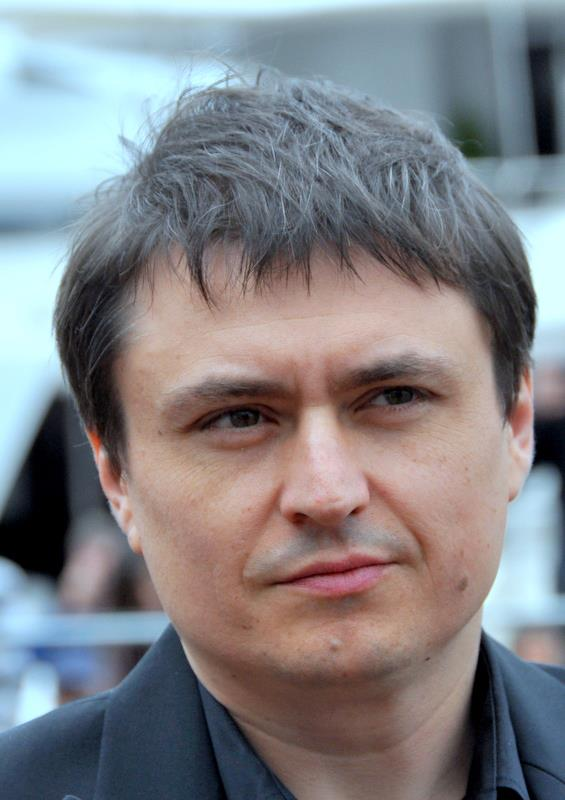
Cristian Mungiu, Palme d'Or winner

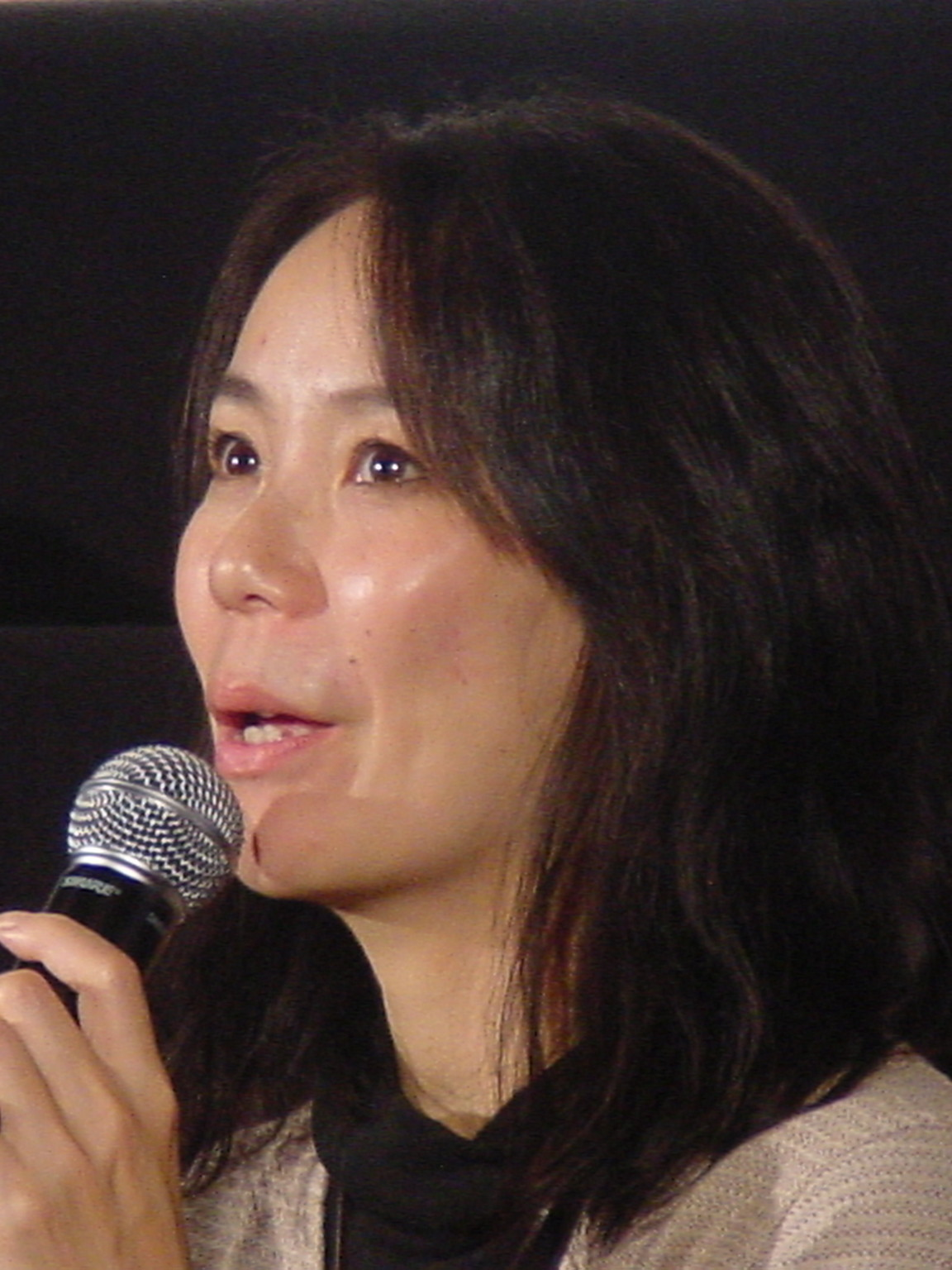
Naomi Kawase, Gran Prix winner

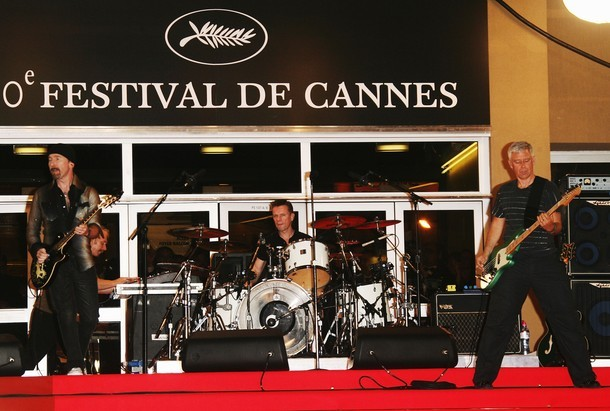
U2 perform at the 2007 Cannes Film Festival, prior to the screening of U2 3D

=== In Competition ===
The following films and people received the 2007 Official selection awards:

- Palme d'Or: 4 Months, 3 Weeks and 2 Days by Cristian Mungiu
- Grand Prix: The Mourning Forest by Naomi Kawase
- Best Director: Julian Schnabel for The Diving Bell and the Butterfly
- Best Screenplay: Fatih Akin for The Edge of Heaven
- Best Actress: Jeon Do-yeon in Secret Sunshine
- Best Actor: Konstantin Lavronenko in The Banishment
- Jury Prize:
  - Persepolis by Vincent Paronnaud, Marjane Satrapi
  - Silent Light by Carlos Reygadas
- 60th Anniversary Prize: Paranoid Park by Gus Van Sant

=== Un Certain Regard ===
- Prix Un Certain Regard: California Dreamin', by Cristian Nemescu
- Special Jury Prize: Actrices by Valeria Bruni Tedeschi
- Heart Throb Jury Prize: The Band's Visit by Eran Kolirin

=== Cinéfondation ===
- First Prize: Ahora todos parecen contentos by Gonzalo Tobal
- Second Prize: Ru Dao by Tao Chen
- Third Prize: Minus by Pavle Vuckovic

=== Caméra d'Or ===
- Jellyfish by Etgar Keret and Shira Geffen
  - Special mention: Control by Anton Corbijn

=== Short Films Competition ===
- Short Film Palme d'Or: Ver Llover by Elisa Miller
  - Special mention:
    - Ah Ma by Anthony Chen
    - Run by Mark Albiston

== Independent Awards ==
=== FIPRESCI Prizes ===
- 4 Months, 3 Weeks and 2 Days by Cristian Mungiu (In competition)
- The Band's Visit by Eran Kolirin (Un Certain Regard)
- Her Name is Sabine by Sandrine Bonnaire (first film, parallel sections)

=== Vulcan Award of the Technical Artist ===
- Janusz Kamiński (cinematographer) for The Diving Bell and the Butterfly

=== Prize of the Ecumenical Jury ===
- The Edge of Heaven by Fatih Akın

=== International Critics' Week ===
- Canal+ Gran Prix for short film: Madame Tutli-Putli
- Petit Rail d'Orpresented by "cinephile railwaymen": Madame Tutli-Putli

=== CICAE Jury Cannes ===
- Counterparts by Jan Bonny

=== Prix François Chalais ===
- A Mighty Heart by Michael Winterbottom

== Media ==
- INA: Climbing of the steps : protocol (commentary in French)
- INA: List of winners of the 2007 Cannes Festival (commentary in French)
