= 20th European Film Awards =

2007 film awards ceremony in Germany

The 20th European Film Awards
- Date: 1 December 2007
- Location: Berlin, Germany
- Presented by: European Film Academy

The 20th Annual European Film Awards took place on 1 December 2007 in Berlin, Germany.

== Winners and nominees ==
=== European Film of the Year ===
English title	Original title	Director(s)	Country
4 Months, 3 Weeks and 2 Days	4 luni, 3 săptămâni și 2 zile	Cristian Mungiu	Romania
The Edge of Heaven	Auf der anderen Seite	Fatih Akın	Germany, Turkey
The Last King of Scotland		Kevin Macdonald	United Kingdom
La Vie en Rose	La Môme	Olivier Dahan	France, Czech Republic, United Kingdom
Persepolis		Marjane Satrapi, Vincent Paronnaud	France
The Queen		Stephen Frears	United Kingdom, France, Italy

=== European Director ===
- (Germany) Fatih Akin — Auf der anderen Seite (The Edge of Heaven)
- (Sweden) Roy Andersson — Du levande (You, the Living)
- (United Kingdom) Stephen Frears — The Queen
- (United Kingdom) Kevin Macdonald — The Last King of Scotland
- (Italy) Giuseppe Tornatore — La sconosciuta (The Unknown Woman)
- (Romania) Cristian Mungiu — 4 luni, 3 săptămâni și 2 zile (4 Months, 3 Weeks and 2 Days)

=== European Actress ===
- (France) Marion Cotillard — La Môme (La Vie en Rose)
- (United Kingdom) Marianne Faithfull — Irina Palm
- (Netherlands) Carice van Houten — Zwartboek (Black Book)
- (Romania) Anamaria Marinca — 4 luni, 3 săptămâni și 2 zile (4 Months, 3 Weeks and 2 Days)
- (United Kingdom) Helen Mirren — The Queen
- (Russia) Ksenia Rappoport — La sconosciuta (The Unknown Woman)

=== European Actor ===
- (Israel) Sasson Gabai — ביקור התזמורת / Bikur ha-Tizmoret (The Band's Visit)
- (Italy) Elio Germano — Mio fratello è figlio unico (My Brother Is an Only Child)
- (United Kingdom) James McAvoy — The Last King of Scotland
- (Serbia) Miki Manojlović — Irina Palm
- (France) Michel Piccoli — Belle Toujours
- (United Kingdom) Ben Whishaw — Das Parfum: Die Geschichte eines Mörders (Perfume: The Story of a Murderer)

=== European Cinematographer ===
- (United Kingdom) Anthony Dod Mantle — The Last King of Scotland
- (Germany) Frank Griebe — Das Parfum: Die Geschichte eines Mörders (Perfume: The Story of a Murderer)
- (Russia) Mikhail Krichman — Изгнание / Izgnaniye (The Banishment)
- (Italy) Fabio Zamarion — La sconosciuta (The Unknown Woman)

=== European Screenwriter ===
- (Germany) Fatih Akin — (Auf der anderen Seite) (The Edge of Heaven)
- (Israel) Eran Kolirin — ביקור התזמורת / Bikur ha-Tizmoret (The Band's Visit)
- (United Kingdom) Peter Morgan — The Queen
- (Romania) Cristian Mungiu — (4 luni, 3 săptămâni și 2 zile) (4 Months, 3 Weeks and 2 Days)

=== European Composer ===
- (United Kingdom) Alexandre Desplat — The Queen
- (United Kingdom) Alex Heffes — The Last King of Scotland
- (Serbia) Dejan Pejović — Гуча! / Guča! (Gucha! Distant Trumpet)
- (Germany) Tom Tykwer, Johnny Klimek and Reinhold Heil — (Das Parfum: Die Geschichte eines Mörders) (Perfume: The Story of a Murderer)

=== European Film Academy Prix d'Excellence ===
- (Germany) Uli Hanisch for Production Design in Das Parfum: Die Geschichte eines Mörders (Perfume: The Story of a Murderer)
- (Germany) Annette Focks, Jörg Höhne, Robin Pohle and Andreas Ruft for Sound Effects in Vier Minuten (Four Minutes)
- (France) Didier Lavergne for Make up in La Môme (La Vie en Rose)
- (Italy) Francesca Sartori for Costume in Alatriste
- (United Kingdom) Lucia Zucchetti for Editing in The Queen

=== European Discovery 2007 ===
- (Israel) ביקור התזמורת / Bikur ha-Tizmoret (The Band's Visit) by Eran Kolirin
- (United Kingdom) Control by Anton Corbijn
- (Germany) Gegenüber (Counterparts) by Jan Bonny
- (Turkey) Takva (A Man's Fear of God) by Özer Kiziltan

=== European Documentary - Prix ARTE ===
- (Germany) / (Austria) Am Limit (To the Limit) by Pepe Danquart
- (Norway) Belarusian Waltz by Andrzej Fidyk
- (Netherlands) Forever by Heddy Honigmann
- (Germany) / (Switzerland) Heitmatklänge (Echoes of Home) by Stefan Schwietert
- (France) Le papier ne peut pas envelopper la braise (Paper Cannot Wrap Up Embers) by Rithy Panh
- (Israel) מלון 9 כוכבים / Malon 9 Kohavim (9 Star Hotel) by Ido Haar
- (Israel) / (Germany) מרגל השמפניה / Meragel Hashampaniya (The Champagne Spy) by Nadav Schirman
- (Belgium) Où est l'amour dans la palmeraie ? (Where Is the Love in the Palmgrove?) by Jérôme Le Maire
- (Bulgaria) Развод по албански / Razvod po albanski (Divorce Albanian Style) by Adela Peeva
- (Denmark) The Monastery by Pernille Rose Grønkjær

=== European Shortfilm - Prix UIP ===
- Prix UIP Ghent: (Belgium) Kwiz by Renaud Callebaut
- Prix UIP Valladolid: (France) Le dîner by Cécile Vernant
- Prix UIP Angers: (United Kingdom) Adjustment by Ian Mackinnon
- Prix UIP Rotterdam: (France) / (Germany) / (Netherlands) Amin by David Dusa
- Prix UIP Berlin: (United Kingdom) Rotten Apple by Ralitza Petrova
- Prix UIP Tampere: (United Kingdom) Dreams and Desires - Family Ties by Joanna Quinn
- Prix UIP Cracow: (United Kingdom) Dad by Daniel Mulloy
- Prix UIP Grimstad: (Norway) Tommy by Ole Giæver
- Prix UIP Vila Do Conde: (Belgium) Plot Point by Nicolas Provost
- Prix UIP Edinburgh: (United Kingdom) Soft by Simon Ellis
- Prix UIP Sarajevo: (United Kingdom) Tokyo Jim by Jamie Rafn
- Prix UIP Venezia: (Spain) Alumbramiento by Eduardo Chapero-Jackson
- Prix UIP Drama: (Spain) Salvador by Abdelatif Hwidar

=== People's Choice Award ===
- 2 Days in Paris by Julie Delpy
- A fost sau n-a fost? (12:08 East of Bucharest) by Corneliu Porumboiu
- Alatriste by Agustín Díaz Yanes
- Zwartboek (Black Book) by Paul Verhoeven
- Obsluhoval jsem anglického krále (I Served the King of England) by Jiří Menzel
- The Last King of Scotland by Kevin Macdonald
- Das Parfum: Die Geschichte eines Mörders (Perfume: The Story of a Murderer) by Tom Tykwer
- The Queen by Stephen Frears
- Reprise by Joachim Trier
- The Unknown Woman (La sconosciuta) by Giuseppe Tornatore
- La Môme (La Vie en Rose) by Olivier Dahan
