= Counterparts (film) =

2007 film by Jan Bonny

- German: Gegenüber
- Directed by: Jan Bonny
- Written by: Jan Bonny; Christina Ebelt
- Produced by: Bettina Brokemper
- Starring: Matthias Brandt; Victoria Trauttmansdorff
- Cinematography: Bernhard Keller
- Edited by: Stefan Stabenow
- Music by: Sonoton
- Production companies: Heimatfilm; Westdeutscher Rundfunk; Filmstiftung NRW
- Distributed by: Wide Management (International sales)
- Release dates: 20 May 2007 (Cannes); 10 October 2007 (Germany)
- Running time: 100 minutes
- Country: Germany
- Language: German
- Budget: €800,000

Counterparts (German: Gegenüber) is a 2007 German psychological drama film directed by Jan Bonny as his debut film.

It premiered at the 2007 Cannes Film Festival, where it competed in Directors' Fortnight. It received an honorable mention for the Art Cinema Award, conferred by CICAE, alongside Anton Corbijn's Control. Bonny and Christina Ebelt won Best Screenplay at the Munich International Film Festival.

== Plot ==
Georg and Anne Hoffmann have been married for twenty years and have two children attending university. Georg works as a police officer. Anne is a primary school teacher. Anne’s father strongly disapproves of their marriage.Anne feels disrespected and undervalued, especially in light of their financial dependence on her father and his disdain regarding their life choices. Hans Josef makes denigrating comments about Georg's career at the weekly Wednesday dinners he insists upon. He also calls regularly during the day when Anne is at work, leaving messages on her home answering machine demanding to know where she is.

Georg has bought Anne a dishwasher after the tense dinner, and Michael helps him carry it up to his apartment. They bring it into the kitchen where Anne is sitting and when Michael alludes to Georg's having saved his life, Anne accuses Georg of keeping important things from her. After Michael leaves, she yells at Georg before beating him as he cringes and lays prone on the carpet.

When an opportunity for promotion presents itself, Georg begins to lose control of the façade he has presented for so long. He recommends Michael to Hinreich for the promotion, but Hinreich is set on Georg, especially after he saved Michael's life. Georg tells Michael about the conversation with Hinreich.

Marie and Lukas come over for Advent breakfast, during which Marie tells Anne she is starting to obsess over their education the way that Hans Josef does. When they get up to leave, she is upset and consoles herself that they will see each other Wednesday. Lukas replies that he and Marie will not be going over to her parents' anymore. After they are gone, Anne blames Georg. Some time later, Lukas visits Georg at work and says he intends to tell Anne himself that he is quitting law school. Georg insists he will take care of it, but that night after Anne fights with him and beats him again, Georg only tells her about his potential promotion, never mentioning Lukas.

Anne meets her father for coffee the next day to tell him the good news. Hans Josef does not react with joy as she expected, so when they go over to her parents' for dinner, she announces that she is taking one of her students, Robert, as a foster child. Her parents ignore her in favor of talking about Georg's promotion. On the way home, Anne tries to take control of the car while Georg is driving, forcing him to pull over. They get out of the car and as she is hitting him in the chest, she asks why he does not fight back like she wants him to.

The next day, Georg calls Marie and asks her to tell Anne about Lukas. He then tells Michael they need to talk. The other officers in the room suggest going over to Georg's for their party, which he initially says no to, but eventually gives in. Anne comes out from the bedroom, awakened by the noise, and joins the party, dancing with Georg, and later Michael. Georg tries to end the party then, but Anne insists it continue, so he leaves the room. When he wakes later to find everyone gone and Anne passed out on the living room floor, he tries to move her. She wakes, sexually assaults him, then moves to the couch to go to sleep.

When Michael and Georg respond to a call, they enter the domicile to find an elderly couple. The wife has a black eye, and both sit mute while Michael asks them questions and Georg examines the wife silently. Some time later, Anne is cooking for Georg with Robert helping her make bread. Robert later falls asleep and Marie comes over, called by Anne to clean out her room so Robert can have it. Marie tells Anne to worry about Lukas and finally tells her about his decision to leave university, saying everyone has been too scared to tell her.

After Marie leaves, Anne calls Michael saying she is looking for Georg. Georg is out on a date with Sabrina, but ends it when he realizes he cannot bring himself to cheat on Anne. He goes home to find Michael and Anne having sex on the couch. He sits down and begins to eat the soup they did not finish before their tryst. Anne is angry that he is not stopping them and goes over to begin hitting him. Michael pulls her off, Georg leaves, and Anne throws Michael out.

When Georg returns, Anne beats him, then pours the food on him as he is lying on his side on the floor. When he starts to get up, she puts his backpack in front of him and calls for a taxi before giving him some cash. After he has left, she gorges on chocolate and water before dissolving pills in a glass and gulping down the contents. The scene cuts to her forcing herself to regurgitate in the kitchen sink, twice.

Georg, at the hospital, tries to tell the doctor that it is not necessary to call family, but the medical staff insist and Marie and Lukas arrive. Marie tells Georg that they cannot do this anymore after he refuses to come stay with her. Lukas is silent. Georg leaves and goes over to Michael's. He reveals his condition to Michael, showing him the bandages from the latest beating. Michael confirms that this is not part of sexual sadomasochism, and when Georg asks if Michael thinks him weak, Michael reminds Georg that he saved Michael's life. Georg then confesses that he did not know if his gun was loaded before approaching that situation.

When Georg goes to work the next day, Michael encourages him to go home. Georg does not, and other officers also try to encourage him to go home. Some ignore him entirely. That evening, he goes to the station for the annual party, when promotions are announced, but does not join them. He returns home to tell Anne he is not being promoted. She begins to verbally abuse him and Georg slaps her. She threatens to have him brought up on charges if he does it again, so he does, twice more, before beginning to beat on her the way she has him. The film ends with Georg lying on the floor, apparently asleep, and Anne picking up her shoes and walking off.

== Cast ==
- Matthias Brandt - Georg Hoffmann, a police officer
- Victoria Trauttmansdorff - Anne Hoffmann, an elementary school teacher
- Wotan Wilke Möhring - Michael Gleiwitz, Georg's partner
- Anna Brass - Marie Hoffmann, Georg and Anne's daughter
- Pablo Ben-Yakov - Lukas Hoffmann, Georg and Anne's son
- Jochen Striebeck - Hans Josef, Anne's father
- Maria Körber - Mechthild, Anne's mother
- Anne Ratte-Polle - Sabrina, Anne's teaching trainee
- Ole Ohlson - Robert, one of Anne's students
- Susanne Bormann - Denise, a police officer
- Özgür Özata - Ahmed Celik, a police officer
- Claus Dieter Clausnitzer - Andreas Hinreich, the police commander
- Till Butterbach - Georg's fellow police officer
- Guntram Brattia - Emergency room doctor
- Max Limper - co-worker

== Production ==
Bonny, who began his work on Counterparts as a student at the Academy of Media Arts Cologne, wrote the screenplay with Christina Ebelt. Bonny also served as director, with this being his debut feature-length film. Bonny stated that he developed the idea after reading a Danish study regarding female violence toward men being more prevalent than previously assumed.

Heimatfilm studios handled the production of the film in association with Westdeutscher Rundfunk and Filmstiftung NRW, (Note: Filmstiftung NRW is noted as "Film Foundation" by The Hollywood Reporter.) with Bettina Brokemper as the producer. International sales were handled by Wide Management of Paris. It had a budget of €800,000, with half being contributed by Filmstiftung and half by WDR as part of the 'Sixpack' production initiative.

Tim Pannen designed the production, with Rainer Heesch and Tobias Fleig responsible for sound. Music was provided through Sonoton and Martin Witte, in Dolby Digital. Frauke Firl designed the costumes. During the scenes where Anne is physically assaulting Georg, Brandt wore a felt-lined steel corset for protection.

Bernhard Keller served as cinematographer for the film, with Stefan Stabenow as the editor. It was filmed in Fujicolor over a span of thirty-two days in Essen with a hand-held camera. Bonny stated that he chose Essen because the city did not have a prior social or economic association the way that Cologne, which is considered "fun-loving", and Düsseldorf, which is associated with wealth, do.

== Themes ==
Counterparts focuses on domestic violence against men. In 2024, 265,942 persons in Germany reported instances of domestic violence, with 171,069 of the cases involving current or previous intimate partners. Prior to 2012, data showing how many men had such violence perpetrated against them had not been studied on a national level, with a study in 2004 including less than 500 men. The film shows an origin of such violence, depicting the unhappiness of the marriage as well as economic hardship, through both the financial aspects involving Anne's father as well as the constraints of the physical space in which the Hoffmanns live.

Included in the film's exploration of such violence is the language used by both abusers and victims to excuse it, as well as the abuser's desire to hear their victim confirm the love between them.

Counterparts also explores the concept of deception and its effects, not only that which is shown to their colleagues, but also in the way that truths about the family are concealed from Anne. It addresses "ritual" humiliation, such as the weekly dinners which the Hoffmanns are made to attend at the behest of Anne's father. In its exploration of Anne's father's involvement in their lives, the film illuminates conditions needed to secure individual freedom on a day-to-day basis.

== Release ==
Counterparts premiered on 20 May 2007 at the 2007 Cannes Film Festival, in competition for Directors' Fortnight. It opened nationally in Germany on 10 October 2007, playing in thirty-five theaters.

It played at film festivals throughout 2007 and 2008. It screened at the Filmstiftung NRW’s International Film Congress on 13 June 2007, and premiered at the Munich International Film Festival in June 2007. It screened at the Broadway Cinema in Trier on 3 October 2007, and also played at the Warsaw Film Festival later that month. In December, it played at the Vendôme Film Festival.

Counterparts screened at the Gothenburg Film Festival in January 2008. It played at the 2008 Shanghai International Film Festival in June 2008. The film played in the 10th Motovun Film Festival in July/August 2008, in competition for the Propeller Award. In November 2008, it screened at the Virton European Film Festival.

It screened as part of the "Frames of Mind" monthly mental health series in Vancouver on 16 June 2010.

== Critical reviews ==
Critics within Germany generally approved of the film, its handling of its themes, and its cinematography. International critics generally did not.

=== Germany ===
Rüdiger Suchsland, in a brief review for artechock, was impressed with Brandt's portrayal of a "weak 'strong man'" as well as Trauttmansdorff's "intensity". Suchsland also commented that the cinematography "reflects mental fragmentation". Jan Schulz-Ojala, writing a review of Cannes for Der Tagesspiegel, noted that Counterparts is more focused on psychology than sociology in its treatment, and that it can be simplified in its message to "you're living wrong if you won't stand up for yourself".

Christian Buß, writing for Der Spiegel stated that the cinematography was "artful", and provided a combination of the familiar environment of middle class German homes with the physical violence of the Hoffmanns' home life. Buß was also impressed with the portrayal of the domestic violence and how the environment itself plays a part in silencing the situation. Buß expressed disappointment with the involvement of Anne's father in the Hoffmans' financial affairs, stating that it offered a simplification of the motivations behind the violence. Overall, Buß was impressed with the film, and described it as a perversion of tenderness.

A critique from Cinefacts.de reproduced at Kino.de emphasized the "complex and multifaceted" aspects to Georg and Anne's relationship, pointing out that assigning labels to either of them is an oversimplification of the film's subject. The reviewer was impressed with the cinematographic choice to limit the viewer's field of vision, which forces "a sense of intimacy" in making the viewer experience the perspective of the characters without any distractions.

Katrin Knauth, writing for Kino Zeit.de stated that the film's direction and the actors' portrayals make Counterparts a "must-see" that doesn't portray sentimentality; instead it provides an "unflinching psychological focus". Knauth was impressed with Bonny's depiction of a "failed marriage", calling it ruthlessly honest.

Alexandra Seitz, writing for Berliner Zeitung, argued that the film is a tragedy rather than a drama, pointing out that Georg is perfectly capable of fending off Anne's violence and chooses not to. Georg's inaction, Seitz argued, is its own "version of aggression" as it reinforces the despair Anne feels. She compared the film to the early works of Franz Xaver Kroetz in its acknowledgement that the violence is "not inevitable, but self-inflicted".

Maurice Lahde, writing for Critic.de, stated that the cold, distant aspect of the film has more in common with Rainer Werner Fassbinder than modern creators, stating that Bonny's direction depicts the situation without requiring the audience to empathize. Lahde approved of the acting, and pointed out how the bleak settings and even that it takes place at Christmas fit the theme of the film.

Christian Horn of Filmstarts stated that the violence was "an expression of the human struggles" Bonny depicts in the film. Horn praised both Trauttmansdorff's and Brandt's performances, which provide an authentic presentation of intimacy. Horn praised Bonny and cinematographer Keller for avoiding detachment from the characters while not over dramatizing the scenario.

Barbara Schweizerhof, writing for Die Tageszeitung, praised Brandt's acting. While Schweizerhof acknowledged that the cinematography, lighting, and surroundings combine to create an "atmosphere of unease", she also noted that the three elements are repeated throughout the entire film, represented in every scene, and called this the "major weakness of an otherwise very strong film". Schweizerhof approved, however, of how Bonny built the tension with incremental escalation of Anne's violence and argued that the most compelling aspect of Counterparts was that she didn't feel as much sympathy for Georg as she perhaps ought to have.

Kuno Kruse, writing for Stern, praised Trauttmansdorff's performance. Kruse was also impressed by Bonny's treatment of the subject matter, but felt that the cinematography caused some moments of the film to lose their intensity and undercut the "characters' emotional depth".

=== International ===
Derek Elley, writing for Variety, stated that the film would struggle to have an audience outside of the film festival circuit. Elley compared the cinematography to made-for-television films, adding that what he felt was an absent score contributed to the "small-screen feel". Elley did praise Trauttmansdorff's acting, specifically how she was able to shift emotions quickly to portray her character, but also stated that the script never explained her "psychosis" to his satisfaction. Elley found the film's tone problematic, describing Georg as "milquetoast" and both Marie and Lukas as "underwritten".

Dan Fainaru, reviewing for Screen Daily, also compared Counterparts to a television film. Fainaru was unimpressed with the script, stating that it "looks more like a textbook case in need of urgent therapy" than a film. He went on to state that neither Anne nor Georg evoke empathetic feelings from the viewer, and that the cinematography seemed "nervous" as well as being too close to allow the characters "space to develop".

Bonnie Gordon, writing for The Hollywood Reporter, stated that the acting was good, but that the characters are underdeveloped. Though Gordon felt Keller's handheld camerawork mostly worked well for the film, it also meant that many scenes were filmed to the rear of the protagonist, keeping their face out of frame and making connecting with the character more difficult. Gordon also approved of the decisions to use lighting natural in the environment, the lack of makeup, and the absence of a musical score. Gordon criticized the script as being "too pat and easy" in its providing a reason for Anne's actions.

Vito Pinto, writing for Cineuropa, stated that the camera was "too close" to the Hoffmanns and resulted in a "troubling atmosphere" when the characters express tenderness following Anne's violence. Like Seitz, Pinto also argued that Georg's "passivity" could be his own means of expressing his aggression in the relationship. Pinto approved of Bonny's neutrality with respect to which of the two protagonists is responsible for their situation.

== Accolades ==
Counterparts received an honorable mention for the Art Cinema Award at its Cannes debut, and won the New German Cinema Award for Best Screenplay when it premiered in Germany at the Munich International Film Festival. It was nominated for the European Discovery Award at the 20th European Film Awards and the Deutsche Filmakademie's First Steps Award, in 2007, as well as the New Faces Award Best Debut Film by an Emerging Director in 2008.

Trauttmansdorff was nominated for the Best Female Lead with Brandt receiving the nomination for Best Male Lead at the 2008 German Film Awards. Jan Bonny received an Honorable Mention for Best Director at the 2007 Filmfestival Münster.

Accolades
Date	Event	Award	Recipient	Result	Ref.
25 May 2007	2007 Cannes Film Festival	Prix art et Essai (Art Cinema Award)	Gegenüber	Honorable Mention	
25 May 2007	2007 Cannes Film Festival	Caméra d'Or	Gegenüber	Nominated	
June 2007	25th Filmfest München	New German Cinema Award for Best Screenplay	Jan Bonny; Christina Ebelt	Won	
28 August 2007	First Steps Award	Best Full-Length Feature Film	Gegenüber	Nominated	
21 October 2007	Filmfestival Münster	Best Director	Jan Bonny	Honorable Mention	
1 December 2007	20th European Film Awards	European Discovery – FIPRESCI	Gegenüber	Nominated	
24 April 2008	New Faces Award	Best Debut Film by an Emerging Director	Gegenüber	Nominated	
25 April 2008	German Film Award	Best Female Lead	Victoria Trauttmansdorff	Nominated	
25 April 2008	German Film Award	Best Male Lead	Matthias Brandt	Nominated	

== See also ==
- 2007 in film
- List of films featuring domestic violence

== Sources ==
- "10 Motovun Film Festival". Zarez (in Croatian). 10 July 2008. p. 4. ISSN 1331-7970 – via Internet Archive.
- "24 German titles at Warsaw Film Fest". Cineuropa. 27 September 2007. Archived from the original on 14 June 2021.
- "24 German films at Göteborg". Cineuropa. 30 January 2008.
- "The Camera d'Or Selection". Cannes Film Festival. 23 May 2007. Archived from the original on 25 July 2023.
- "Counterparts". European Film Academy. 2007.
- "Counterparts (Gegenüber)". Frames of Mind. 1 June 2010. Archived from the original on 15 August 2020.
- "Gegenüber". Kino.de (in German). 2007. Archived from the original on 29 June 2016.
- "Gegenüber". German Film Award (in German). n.d. Archived from the original on 3 July 2026.
- ""Gegenüber" von Jan Bonny" ["Counterparts" by Jan Bonny]. Trierischer Volksfreund (in German). 26 September 2007.
- "German Cinema New Talent Award". Filmfest München. n.d. Archived from the original on 6 December 2025.
- "German presence a powerhouse at Shanghai". Cineuropa. 3 June 2008. Archived from the original on 26 August 2019.
- "LOLA nominees announced". Cineuropa. 31 March 2008.
- "Nachwuchsfilmer-Preis "First Steps" wird verliehen" [Emerging filmmakers "First Steps" awards presented]. Rheinische Post (in German). 28 August 2007.
- "New faces award für "Die Welle"". Hubert Burda Media (in German). 24 April 2008. Archived from the original on 3 July 2026 – via LifePR.de.
- "Die Preisträger 2007" [2007 Award Winners]. Filmfestival Münster (in German). 2007. Archived from the original on 21 October 2007.
- "La Quinzaine des réalisateurs a décerné ses prix" [Prizes awarded for the Directors' Fortnight]. Le Nouvel Obs (in French). 26 May 2007.
- Barz, Paul (14 October 2007). "Eine Frau, die gern in Abgründe taucht" [A woman, who plunges into the abyss]. Die Welt (in German).
- Blaney, Martin (4 May 2007). "Wide Management picks up Quinzaine title Counterparts". Screen Daily. Archived from the original on 4 November 2017.
- Bonny, Jan (13 June 2007). "Filmkongress: Interview mit Regisseur Jan Bonny - Von der Stärke, sich nicht zu wehren" [Film Congress: Interview with Director Jan Bonny – On the Strength of Not Fighting Back]. Westdeutsche Zeitung (Interview) (in German). Interviewed by Marion Troja.
- Buß, Christian (12 October 2007). "Ehe-Drama "Gegenüber": Wenn Frauen Männer schlagen" [Marital drama "Gegenüber": When women hit men]. Der Spiegel (in German). Archived from the original on 24 January 2013.
- Camino Gonzalez, Jenipher, ed. (2 August 2025). "Domestic violence cases reach new record — report". Deutsche Welle. Archived from the original on 4 July 2026.
- Elley, Derek (21 May 2007). "Counterparts: A grim, occasionally black comic drama of a couple locked in a cycle of love and abuse". Variety.
- Engelen, Aurore (6 November 2008). "From Cannes to Virton". Cineuropa. Archived from the original on 2 February 2021.
- Fainaru, Dan (22 May 2007). "Counterparts (Gegenueber)". Screen International. Archived from the original on 19 October 2019.
- Gordon, Bonnie J. (23 July 2007). "Counterparts: Film Review". Hollywood Reporter. Archived from the original on 2 July 2026.
- Horn, Christian (n.d.). "Kritik der FILMSTARTS-Redaktion" [Review by the editors of Filmstarts]. Filmstarts (in German).
- Jekubzik, Günter H. (n.d.). "Gegenüber". Programmkino.de (in German). Archived from the original on 13 October 2007.
- Jud, Andreas; Grafe, Bianca; Meshkova, Ksenia; Kavemann, Barbara; Meysen, Thomas; Hoffmann, Ulrike; Ziegenhain, Ute; Fegert, Jörg M. (26 April 2022). "Prevalence and Predictors of Affirmations of Intimate Partner Violence in Germany: A First Nationwide Study on Victimization in Women and Men". Journal of Interpersonal Violence. 38 (1–2): 1473–1493. doi:10.1177/08862605221092066. eISSN 1552-6518. ISSN 0886-2605. PMC 9709540. PMID 35469490.
- Knauth, Katrin (2007). "Szenen einer Ehe" [Scenes from a Marriage]. Kino Zeit.de (in German). Archived from the original on 29 December 2008.
- Kruse, Kuno (12 October 2007). "Scham schmerzt mehr als Gewalt" [Shame is more painful than violence]. Stern (in German).
- Lahde, Maurice (25 September 2007). "Gegenüber – Kritik". critic.de (in German). Archived from the original on 8 December 2010.
- Lemercier, Fabien (10 December 2007). "Vendôme: Spotlight on regional support for European cinema". Cineuropa.
- Père, Olivier (n.d.). "Gegenüber (Counterparts) (2007) directed by Jan Bonny". Phaidon Press. Archived from the original on 26 February 2014.
- Petković, Vladan (14 July 2008). "Motovun celebrates Russia". Cineuropa. Archived from the original on 25 July 2021.
- Pinto, Vitor (20 May 2007). "Counterparts: Violence suits them". Cineuropa. Archived from the original on 16 August 2018.
- Rauger, Jean-François (29 April 2008). ""L'Un contre l'autre": l'homme battu, la femme violente et le père dominateur" ["Counterparts": the beaten husband, the violent wife, and the dominating father]. Le Monde (in French). Archived from the original on 2 August 2023.
- Roxborough, Scott (28 September 2007). "Diverse quartet to face off for Discovery nod". The Hollywood Reporter. Associated Press.
- Schmetkamp, Susanne (19 June 2007) [18 June 2007]. "Wer wagt mehr?" [Who dares more?]. Die Zeit (in German).
- Schulz-Ojala, Jan (22 May 2007). "Von allen guten Eltern verlassen" [Abandoned by All Good Parents]. Der Tagesspiegel (in German). Archived from the original on 18 January 2008.
- Schwalm, Dagmar (10 October 2007). "Liebe am Abgrund" [Love on the Brink]. Westdeutsche Allgemeine Zeitung (in German). Archived from the original on 5 July 2026.
- Schweizerhof, Barbara (13 October 2007). "Der verprügelte Ehemann" [The Battered Husband]. Die Tageszeitung (in German). Archived from the original on 5 July 2026.
- Seitz, Alexandra (15 October 2007). "Jan Bonnys Film "Gegenüber" handelt von der alltäglichen Gewalt: Kein Drama - eine Tragödie" [Jan Bonny's "Counterparts" deals with everyday violence: It's not a drama - but a tragedy]. Berliner Zeitung (in German). Archived from the original on 2 July 2026.
- Suchsland, Rüdiger (23 May 2007). "Liberté, Egalité, Fraternité: französische Werte, türkisches Kino und la condition allemande" [Liberty, Equality, Fraternity: French values, Turkish cinema and the German condition]. artechock (in German). Archived from the original on 1 September 2007.
- Tilmann, Christina (13 July 2009). "Fernsehen: "Gegenüber": Ehefrau schlägt Ehemann: Ein Film über alltäglichen Familienhorror mit Matthias Brandt in der Hauptrolle" [Television: "Counterparts": Wife beats husband" A film about the horror of everyday familial life starring Matthias Brandt as the leading man]. Der Tagesspiegel.
- Wolf, Christof (11 October 2007). "Die traurige Stadt" [The Sad City]. Neue Ruhr Zeitung (in German). Archived from the original on 5 July 2026.
