= Filmatique =

Video streaming service

Filmatique is a boutique video streaming service that specializes in contemporary art-house, independent, and foreign films.

Filmatique operates on a weekly release model, encouraging audiences to engage more deeply with its films, which are often directed by underrepresented filmmakers. Filmatique aims to promote a diverse vision of global cinema and films from international festivals that do not gain mainstream visibility.

The New York Times has labelled Filmatique as "where to stream foreign movies you can’t find elsewhere."

Filmatique's streaming platform is available in the United States and Canada on the web, and on AppleTV and Roku devices. Filmatique is headquartered in Brooklyn, New York.

Filmatique is a curated streaming service, releasing films as part of monthly series. Their first series, Banned Nations, launched in March 2017, in response to Donald Trump's original Muslim travel ban.

Filmatique has collaborated with film festivals, including Locarno Film Festival and Tallinn Black Nights Film Festival, to spotlight films from their selections. As part of its curatorial approach, Filmatique also publishes scholarly essays and interviews with filmmakers such as Carlos Reygadas, Gabriel Mascaro, Elisa Miller, Chaitanya Tamhane, Annemarie Jacir, Wang Xiaoshuai, Ena Sendijarević, and Phuttiphong Aroonpheng.

In 2017 Filmatique expanded its service to the Canadian market. In 2019 the company launched an online film festival which promotes first and second-time directors from across the globe.

== See also ==
- Fandor
- FilmStruck
- Indieflix
- Kanopy
- Mubi
- Netflix
- The Criterion Collection (The Criterion Channel)
