= Missing Kissinger =

1994 novel by Etgar Keret

- First edition (Hebrew)
- Author: Etgar Keret
- Original title: געגועי לקיסינג'ר
- Translator: Miriam Shlesinger & Sondra Silverston
- Language: Hebrew
- Subject: Fiction
- Genre: Short stories
- Publisher: Zmora Bitan
- Publication date: 1994
- Publication place: Israel
- English publication date: 2007
- Pages: 159

Missing Kissinger is a collection of short stories by Israeli writer Etgar Keret, published in 1994. It is Keret's second published work.

== Content ==
The book is an anthology of surreal and ambiguous short stories. The stories are about five pages long, presented in laconic sentences with use of intentionally spare, antiliterary vocabulary. About fifty stories span two hundred and fifty pages. The protagonists are Average Joes "taking impossible things seriously and grave matters lightly". Keret says: "I would call it subjective realism, I am trying to show things the way they feel." Keret explains that his work is influenced by Franz Kafka: "Kafka tries to reach his moral goal by disorientating the reader. A short story in this style is like a slap in the face."

== Reception ==
The book was a popular success and considered author's breakthrough creation. The daily newspaper Yedioth Ahronoth named the book as one of the 50 most important works in Hebrew. Stories from this book are now included on the Israeli high school syllabus.

A review of Missing Kissinger by Todd McEwen describes Etgar Keret's locale as that of "male confusion, loneliness, blundering, bellowing and, above all, stasis. His narrator is trapped in an angry masculine wistfulness which is awful to behold in its masturbatory disconnection from the world's real possibilities and pleasures." Etgar is "not much of a stylist - you get the impression that he throws three or four of these stories off on the bus to work every morning," and his "wild, blackly inventive pieces...might have been dreamed up by a mad scientist rather than a writer."
