= Ver Llover =

- Directed by: Elisa Miller
- Written by: Elisa Miller
- Release date: 2006
- Country: Mexico
- Language: Spanish

Ver Llover ("See Rain") is a short film by Elisa Miller.

This fiction short film, written and directed by Elisa Miller while a student at the Mexican film academy, the Centro de Capacitación Cinematográfica (CCC), as her third-year endpaper, was originally presented at the Guanajuato Film Festival, to excellent reviews but no awards. Next, it won the "Best short fiction film" award at the Morelia Film Festival 2006 and competed, and won, the Palme d´Or short film at the 2007 Cannes Film Festival.

Best short film at Brasil's Femina fest, Best short fiction at Habana (Cuba) International film fest, among others.

The film won the Ariel Award from the Mexican Academy of Film.

== Sources ==
- Ver LLover at IMDb
- Cannes Film Festival film details
