= Shira Geffen =

Israeli film director, screenwriter and actor

- שירה גפן
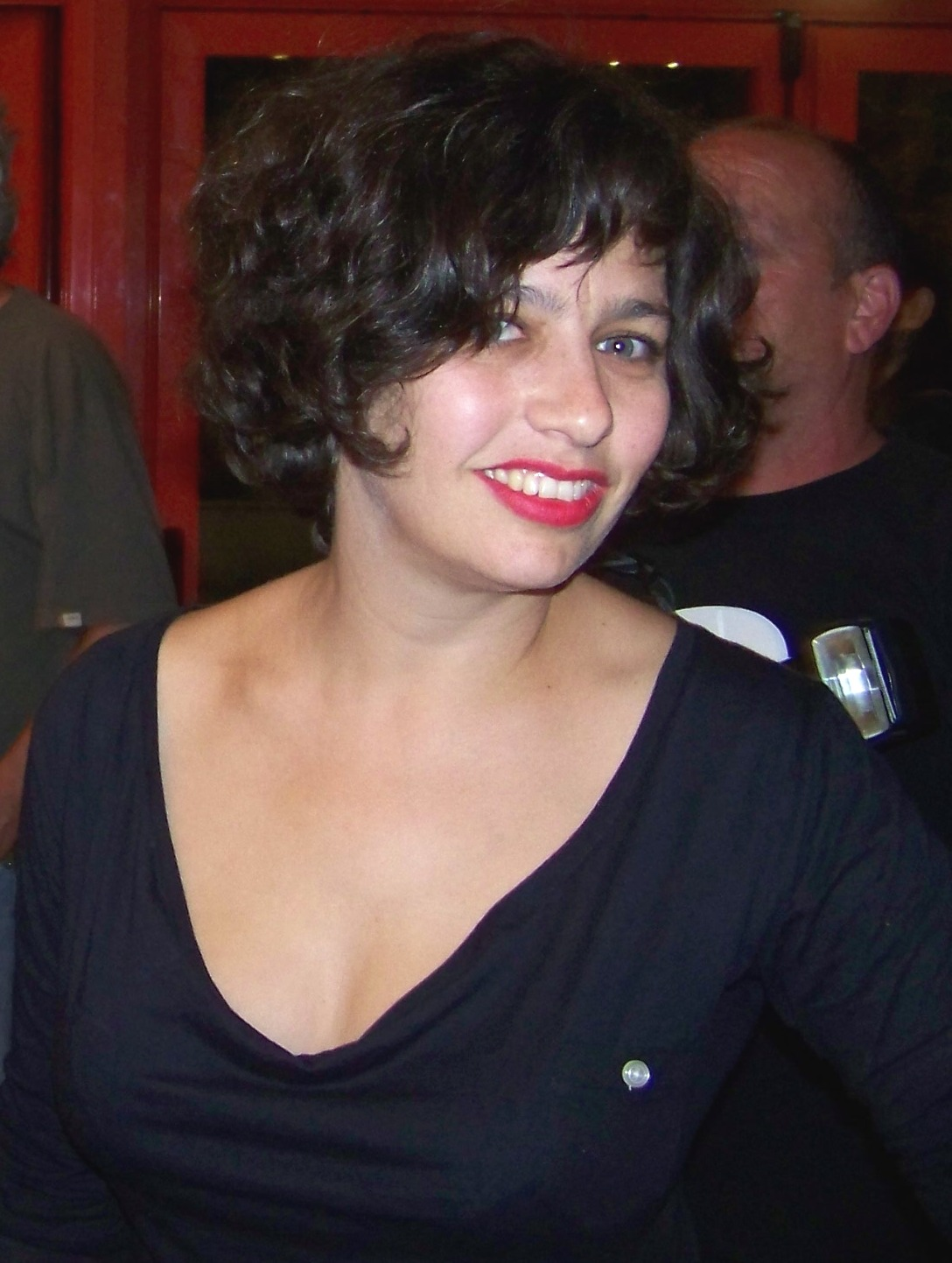
- Shira Geffen (2010)
- Born: April 30, 1971 (age 55); Ramat Gan
- Occupations: Actress, screenwriter, film director
- Spouse: Etgar Keret
- Parent: Yehonatan Geffen
- Relatives: Aviv Geffen (brother)

Shira Geffen (Hebrew: שירה גפן; born April 30, 1971) is an Israeli actress, screenwriter, film director and children's book writer.

== Biography ==
Shira Geffen was born in 1971. Her father, Yehonatan Geffen, was an author. Her brother, Aviv Geffen, is a singer. She was also the niece of film director Assi Dayan. She is married to Israeli author Etgar Keret. They have one son.

== Acting and directing career ==
She has acted in a television series, BeTipul, and in films. She has also written and directed two films, Jellyfish, and Self Made. Jellyfish was written by her and directed by her husband; it won the Camera d'Or at the 2007 Cannes Film Festival. In 2014, she directed Self Made, also known as Boreg in Israel. It was presented at the Cannes Film Festival and at the Jerusalem Film Festival.

== Views and opinions ==
At the 2014 Jerusalem Film Festival, she wrote a letter calling for an end to the conflict in Gaza together with Keren Yedaya and other filmmakers.

== Awards and recognition ==
Geffen won First Prize at the Haifa Children's Theater Festival in 1998 and the Hadassah Prize in 2003. In 2007, Geffen and her husband Etgar Keret won the Cannes Film Festival's Camera d'Or Award for Jellyfish. The French Artists' and Writers' Guild also awarded Geffen and Keret the Best Director Award (2007).

== See also ==
- Israeli literature
- Culture of Israel
