= Magnus (2007 film) =

2007 film directed by Kadri Kõusaar

Magnus (Estonian film)
- Directed by: Kadri Kõusaar
- Produced by: Donus Fernandes
- Production companies: Donus Films (Great Britain), Vitamin K Film
- Release date: 2007
- Country: Estonia
- Language: Estonian

Magnus is a 2007 Estonian drama film directed by Kadri Kõusaar.

The film explores the psychological struggle of a teenager named Magnus, who no longer sees a purpose to his existence. The plot follows his father’s attempts to intervene after becoming aware of Magnus’s plan to end his life.

This film is the first Estonian film chosen for the official program of Cannes Film Festival.

The film faced significant legal challenges, as Tallinn Circuit Court (Estonian: Tallinna ringkonnakohus) restricted the film’s distribution, barring public exhibition until 2025.
