= Etgar Keret =

Israeli writer (born 1967)

- Etgar Keret, 2026
- Born: אתגר קרת; August 20, 1967 (age 59); Ramat Gan, Israel
- Education: Ben-Gurion University of the Negev, Tel Aviv University
- Spouse: Shira Geffen
- Writing career
- Language: Hebrew
- Genres: short stories, graphic novels, screenwriting
- Notable awards: Ordre des Arts et des Lettres
- Website: www.etgarkeret.com

Etgar Keret (Hebrew: אתגר קרת; born August 20, 1967) is an Israeli writer known for his short stories, graphic novels, and scriptwriting for film and television.

== Early life ==
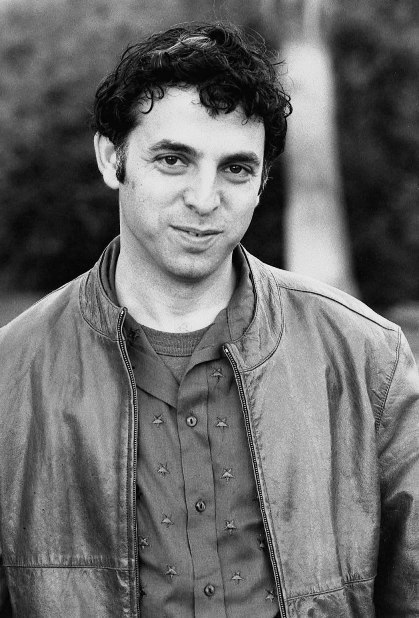
Etgar Keret in 2005

Keret was born in Ramat Gan, Israel in 1967. He is a third child to parents who survived the Holocaust. Both of his parents are from Poland. He studied at Ohel Shem high school, and at the Adi Lautman Interdisciplinary Programme for Outstanding Students of Tel Aviv University.

== Literary career ==
Keret's first published work was Pipelines (צינורות, Tzinorot, 1992), a collection of short stories which was largely ignored when it came out. His second book, Missing Kissinger (געגועיי לקיסינג'ר, Ga'agu'ai le-Kissinger, 1994), a collection of fifty very short stories, caught the attention of the general public. The short story "Siren", which deals with the paradoxes of modern Israeli society, is included in the curriculum for the Israeli matriculation exam in literature.

Keret has co-authored several comic books, among them Nobody Said It Was Going to Be Fun (לא באנו ליהנות, Lo banu leihanot, 1996) with Rutu Modan and Streets of Fury (סמטאות הזעם, Simtaot Haza'am, 1997) with Asaf Hanuka. In 1999, five of his stories were translated into English, and adapted into "graphic novellas" under the joint title Jetlag. The illustrators were the five members of the Actus Tragicus collective.

In 1998, Keret published Kneller's Happy Campers (הקייטנה של קנלר, Hakaytana Shel Kneller), a collection of short stories. The title story, the longest in the collection, follows a young man who commits suicide and goes on a quest for love in the afterlife. It appears in the English language collection of Keret's stories The Bus Driver Who Wanted To Be God & Other Stories (2004) and was adapted into the graphic novel Pizzeria Kamikaze (2006), with illustrations by Asaf Hanuka. Keret's latest short story collections are Anihu (אניהו, literally I-am-him, 2002; translated into English as Cheap Moon, after one of the other stories in the collection) and Pitom Defikah Ba-delet (פתאום דפיקה בדלת, translated into English as Suddenly a Knock at the Door).

Keret also wrote a children's book Dad Runs Away with the Circus (2004), illustrated by Rutu Modan.

Keret publishes some of his works on the Hebrew-language web site "Bimah Hadashah" (New Stage).

His 2019 book published in English as Fly Already (תקלה בקצה הגלקסיה, literally Glitch at the Edge of the Galaxy) won Israel’s prestigious Sapir Prize in Literature. The prize includes a paid translation of the winning book into any language of the author’s choosing, and Keret gained some attention for selecting Yiddish. This was the first time an author had chosen that language in the prize’s 20-year history.

== Other media ==
Keret has worked in Israeli television and film, including three seasons as a writer for the popular sketch show The Cameri Quintet. He also wrote the story for the 2001 TV movie Aball'e starring Shmil Ben Ari.

In 2006, Wristcutters: A Love Story, a dark comedy/love story based on Keret's novella Kneller's Happy Campers, premiered at the Sundance Film Festival. The story was adapted by director Goran Dukić into a film starring Patrick Fugit, Shannyn Sossamon, Tom Waits and Will Arnett.

Etgar and his wife Shira directed the 2007 film Jellyfish, based on a story written by Shira.

$9.99, a stop motion animated feature film, was released in 2009. Written by Keret and directed by Tatia Rosenthal, it is an Israeli/Australian co-production featuring the voices of Geoffrey Rush, Anthony LaPaglia and other leading Australian actors.

In 2010 a short feature film based on Keret's story was released. An Exclusive novella was adapted and directed by the young Polish director Krzysztof Szot. The film, also known as Wyłączność (An Exclusive), was presented at the Cannes Film Festival 2010 in the Short Film Corner section.

Keret's work is frequently featured on the public radio program This American Life, which has presented readings of eight of his stories.

In October 2011 the public radio show Selected Shorts devoted an entire show to live readings of Keret's stories, including “Suddenly a Knock at the Door,” “Halibut," “Lieland”, and “Fatso.” Keret himself introduced several of the stories.

In August 2012, the short film Glue based on Etgar Keret's short story "Crazy Glue", participated in the Rhode Island International Film Festival.

In May 2013, the short film LieLand, adapted and directed by Silvia Grossmann, a Brazilian/American filmmaker, premiered at the Cannes Film Festival.

In 2017, Keret's short story Parallel Universes was adapted into a short film by British-Israeli actor Liran Nathan. The film was screened at various international film festivals including the Newport Beach Film Festival and the British Urban Film Festival.

On five evenings in February 2021, the Jewish Museum Berlin screened the Covid-19 fairy tale "Outside," projected onto the exterior wall of the Libeskind building (which was closed at the time due to the pandemic). The video was a co-production between Keret and the choreographer Inbal Pinto. The Jewish Museum Berlin also presented an exhibition by Keret from October 2022 to March 2023 titled "Inside Out." Based on memories of his mother, Keret wrote new short stories for the exhibit, portraying day-to-day life in Israel, as well as recounting war-time experiences of his mother, who was a Holocaust survivor. The short stories, including "The First Angel You See," were displayed alongside objects from the collections of the Jewish Museum Berlin and commissions created by contemporary artists in collaboration with Keret.

== Writing style ==
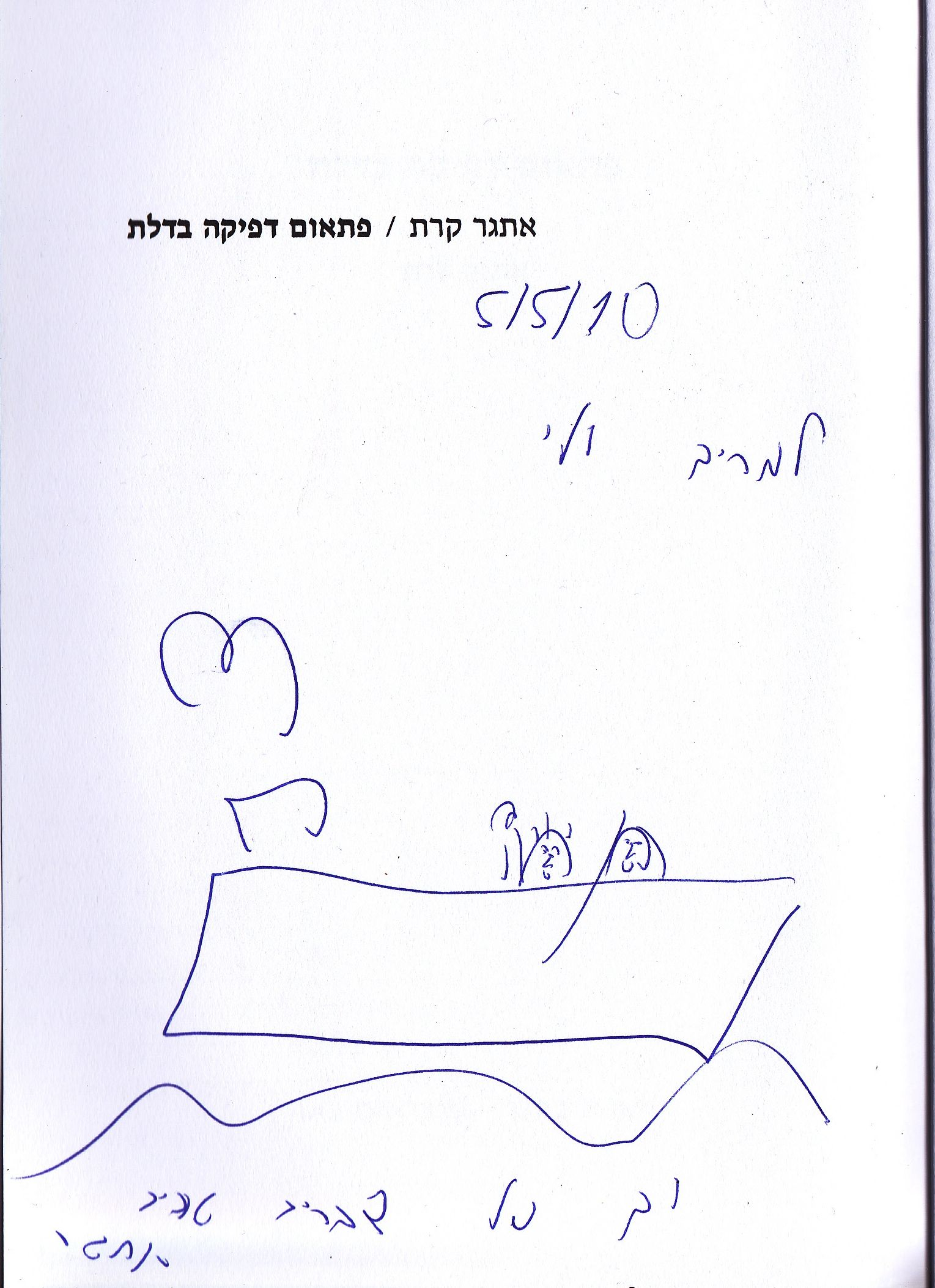
Autograph on Keret's book, Jerusalem, 2010, writers' conference

Keret's writing style is lean, using everyday language, slang, and dialect. His work has influenced many writers of his generation, as well as bringing a renewed surge in popularity for the short story form in Israel in the second half of the 1990s.

According to linguist Ghil'ad Zuckermann, Etgar Keret was criticized by linguist Menahem Zevi Kaddari "for using a 'thin language' – as opposed to Shmuel Yosef Agnon". Zuckermann defends Keret and argues that "Kaddari compares Keret to Agnon as if they wrote in two different registers of the same language" whereas "Keret is, in fact, writing in a different language. Whilst Agnon attempts to write in (Mishnaic) Hebrew, which is obviously not his mother tongue (Yiddish), Keret writes authentically in his native Israeli." Zuckermann provides an example: when Agnon wrote, in 1944, אשתו מתה עליו ishtó méta alàv, literally "his wife died/dies on him", he meant "he became a widower". When Keret says so, he means "his wife loves him very much".

== Awards ==
Keret has received the Prime Minister's award for literature, as well as the Ministry of Culture's Cinema Prize. In 2006 he was chosen as an outstanding artist of the prestigious Israel Cultural Excellence Foundation.

In 1993 he won the first prize in the Alternative Theater Festival in Akko for Entebbe: A Musical, which he wrote with Jonathan Bar Giora.

The short film Malka Lev Adom (Skin Deep, 1996), which Keret wrote and directed with Ran Tal, won an Israel Film Academy award and first place in the Munich International Festival of Film Schools. The film Jellyfish, a joint venture for Keret and his wife received the Camera d'Or prize at the 2007 Cannes Film Festival. Missing Kissinger won the 2008 JQ Wingate Prize.

Keret was on the jury for the 2010 Neustadt International Prize for Literature.

In 2010, Keret received the Chevalier (Knight) Medallion of France's Ordre des Arts et des Lettres.

He has received the Charles Bronfman Prize for 2016.

Keret received the 2018 Sapir Prize for Literature for his short-story collection Takalah be-Katzeh ha-Galaksiya (Hebrew title: תקלה בקצה הגלקסיה, "A Glitch at the Edge of the Galaxy") whose English translation, Fly Already, won the 2019 National Jewish Book Award for Fiction. This book also appeared in a Bulgarian translation in 2020.

== Inspirations ==
- Slaughterhouse-Five by Kurt Vonnegut
- The Metamorphosis by Franz Kafka
- The Sound and the Fury by William Faulkner
- Miller's Crossing by the Coen brothers
- Twelve Monkeys by Terry Gilliam

== Criticism ==
A review of Missing Kissinger by Todd McEwen describes Etgar Keret's locale as that of "male confusion, loneliness, blundering, bellowing and, above all, stasis. His narrator is trapped in an angry masculine wistfulness which is awful to behold in its masturbatory disconnection from the world's real possibilities and pleasures." Keret is "not much of a stylist - you get the impression that he throws three or four of these stories off on the bus to work every morning," and his "wild, blackly inventive pieces...might have been dreamed up by a mad scientist rather than a writer."

== Personal life ==
He lives in Tel Aviv with his wife, Shira Geffen, and their son, Lev, born in 2006. Etgar Keret is a lecturer at Ben-Gurion University of the Negev in Beer Sheva, and at Tel Aviv University. He holds dual Israeli and Polish citizenship.

== Selected works ==
=== Short fiction collections ===
- The Bus Driver Who Wanted to Be God & Other Stories, Toby Press, 2004 (ISBN 1-59264-105-9)

Includes "Kneller's Happy Campers" and other stories.

- Gaza Blues with Samir El-Youssef, London: David Paul, 2004 (ISBN 0-9540542-4-5)

15 short stories by Keret and a novella by El-Youssef.

- The Nimrod Flipout, Farrar, Straus and Giroux, 2006 (ISBN 0-374-22243-6)
- Missing Kissinger, Vintage Books, 2008 (ISBN 0-09-949816-2)
- The Girl On The Fridge, Farrar, Straus and Giroux, 2008 (ISBN 0-374-53105-6)

Includes "Crazy Glue" and other short stories from Keret's first collections.

- Four Stories, Syracuse University Press, 2010 (ISBN 0-8156-8156-9)
- Suddenly, a Knock on the Door, Farrar, Straus and Giroux, 2012 (ISBN 978-0-374-53333-5)
- Fly Already, Riverhead Books, 2019 (ISBN 978-1783780495)
- Autocorrect, Riverhead Books, 2025 (ISBN 9780593717233)

=== Short stories ===
- "Creative writing". The New Yorker. New York: Condé Nast. January 2, 2012.
- "Mitzvah". The New Yorker. New York: Condé Nast. June 20, 2022.
- "Intention". The Guardian. London: Guardian Media Group. December 3, 2023.

=== Comics ===
- Jetlag, Tel Aviv, Actus Tragicus, 1998; Top Shelf Productions, 1999 (ISBN 965-90221-0-7)
- Pizzeria Kamikaze, illustrated by Asaf Hanuka, Alternative Comics, 2005 (ISBN 1-891867-90-3)

=== Children's books ===
- Dad Runs Away With The Circus, Candlewick Press, 2004 (ISBN 0-7636-2247-8)
- A Moonless Night (לילה בלי ירח), Am Oved Publishers, with Shira Geffen and David Polonsky, 2006 (ISBN 9789651318504)

=== Memoirs ===
- The Seven Good Years: A Memoir. Riverhead Books. 2015. (ISBN 978-1594633263)

=== Television ===
- The Middleman (Original title: L'agent immobilier), 2020

== See also ==
- Keret House - a two-story art installation by the architect Jakub Szczęsny named after Etgar Keret, who was the narrow building's first tenant.
