= Klaus Holzkamp =

German psychologist

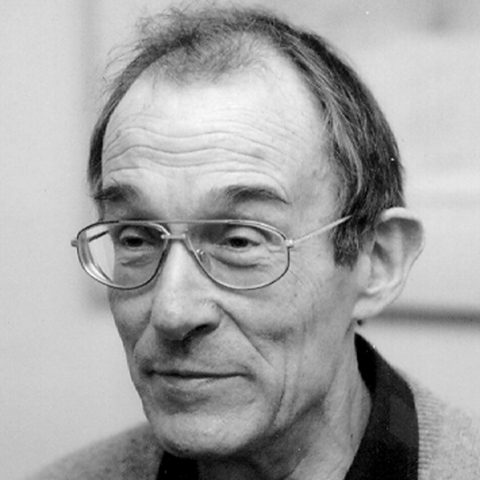
Klaus Holzkamp.

Klaus Holzkamp (30 November 1927, Berlin – 1 November 1995, Berlin) was a German psychologist.

== Research ==
Klaus Holzkamp worked as a professor at the Free University of Berlin. He took a central role in defining critical psychology based on the works of Karl Marx and Aleksei N. Leontiev. Holzkamp's main message is that mainstream psychology serves the interest of the power elite by disregarding the ability of humans to change their life circumstances. In a standard scientific study in the field of psychology the test setting is taken as a given, unchangeable fact, while in real life people may organize themselves and transform society.

He worked and lived together with his wife Christine Holzkamp-Osterkamp.

=== Pupils ===
Holzkamp's ideas have been conserved and transformed by several younger academic teachers like Karl-Heinz Braun (UAS Magdeburg), Ole Dreier, Barbara Grüter (U. of Bremen), Manfred Günther (SFBB), Wilhelm Kempf (U. of Konstanz), Wolfgang Maiers (U. of Magdeburg, Morus Markard, Rainer Seidel or Irmingard Staeuble (all three: FU of Berlin).

== Selected works ==
German books:

- Kritische Psychologie - Vorbereitende Arbeiten (1972)
- Grundlegung der Psychologie (1983)
- Lernen. Subjektwissenschaftliche Grundlegung (1993)
