= The Oates' Valor =

- Directed by: Tim Thaddeus Cahill
- Written by: Tim Thaddeus Cahill
- Produced by: Andy Bruntel, Leo Jaramillo (co-producers); Tim Thaddeus Cahill, Ross Danielson, Victory Palmisano, Ali Zubik (producers)
- Starring: Conrad Apfell; Daniel Carpenter; Jordan David; Grant Gimby; Shannon Holt; Adèle Jacques; Jack Moore; Amanda O'Brien; Ryan Patterson; Whitney Rydbeck
- Cinematography: David Rom
- Edited by: Matt Barber
- Distributed by: Independent
- Release date: April 19, 2007
- Running time: 14 minutes
- Country: United States
- Languages: English; French

The Oates' Valor is a short film written and directed by Tim Thaddeus Cahill. Cahill's first film is a coming of age comedy of a son's conflict with his demanding father. This 14 minute color piece was filmed on Super 16 mm film.

== Plot ==
Teenage Boyson Oates (played by Jordan David) conflicts with his demanding father (played by Jack Moore). After an unsuccessful attempt to follow his father's orders, Boyson runs away from home, but is lured back for a reconciliation by one final parental act of appeasement.

== Reception ==
The film premiered at the Sundance Film Festival. It has been featured at the Silver Lake Film Festival, the Nantucket International Film Festival, Small Potato Short Film Festival, and the Dereel Independent Film Festival.

It will be a Competition Short at the 2007 Cannes Film Festival.
