= List of films featuring domestic violence =

This is a list of feature-length films that have instances of domestic violence.

== List of films ==
Film	Year	Ref.
3BHK	2025	
Amityville II: The Possession	1982	
Anatomy of a Fall	2023	
Anatomy of a Murder	1959	
The Banshees of Inisherin	2022	
Boyhood	2014	
Break Up	1998	
The Burning Bed	1984	
The Color Purple	1985	
Counterparts	2007	
Dangerous Intentions	1995	
Domestic Violence	2001	
The Edge of Heaven	2007	
eMANcipation	2011	
Enough	2002	
The Family That Preys	2008	
Forrest Gump	1994	
The Godfather	1972	
The Godfather Part II	1974	
Goodfellas	1990	
Herself	2020	
I, Tonya	2017	
In the Bedroom	2001	
It	2017	
Jolene	2008	
Linoleum	2022	
Mary Jane Harper Cried Last Night	1977	
Monster's Ball	2001	
Not Without My Daughter	1990	
The Official Story	1985	
Once Were Warriors	1994	
The Purple Rose of Cairo	1985	
Raging Bull	1980	
Revolutionary Road	2008	
Sleeping with the Enemy	1991	
The Shining	1980	
Star Wars: Episode III – Revenge of the Sith	2005	
The Stepfather	1987	
Take My Eyes	2003	
Tenet	2020	
Untold: Deal with the Devil	2021	
Vacationland	2006	
What's Love Got to Do with It	1993	
When No One Would Listen	1992	
While She Was Out	2008	
