= Keret House =

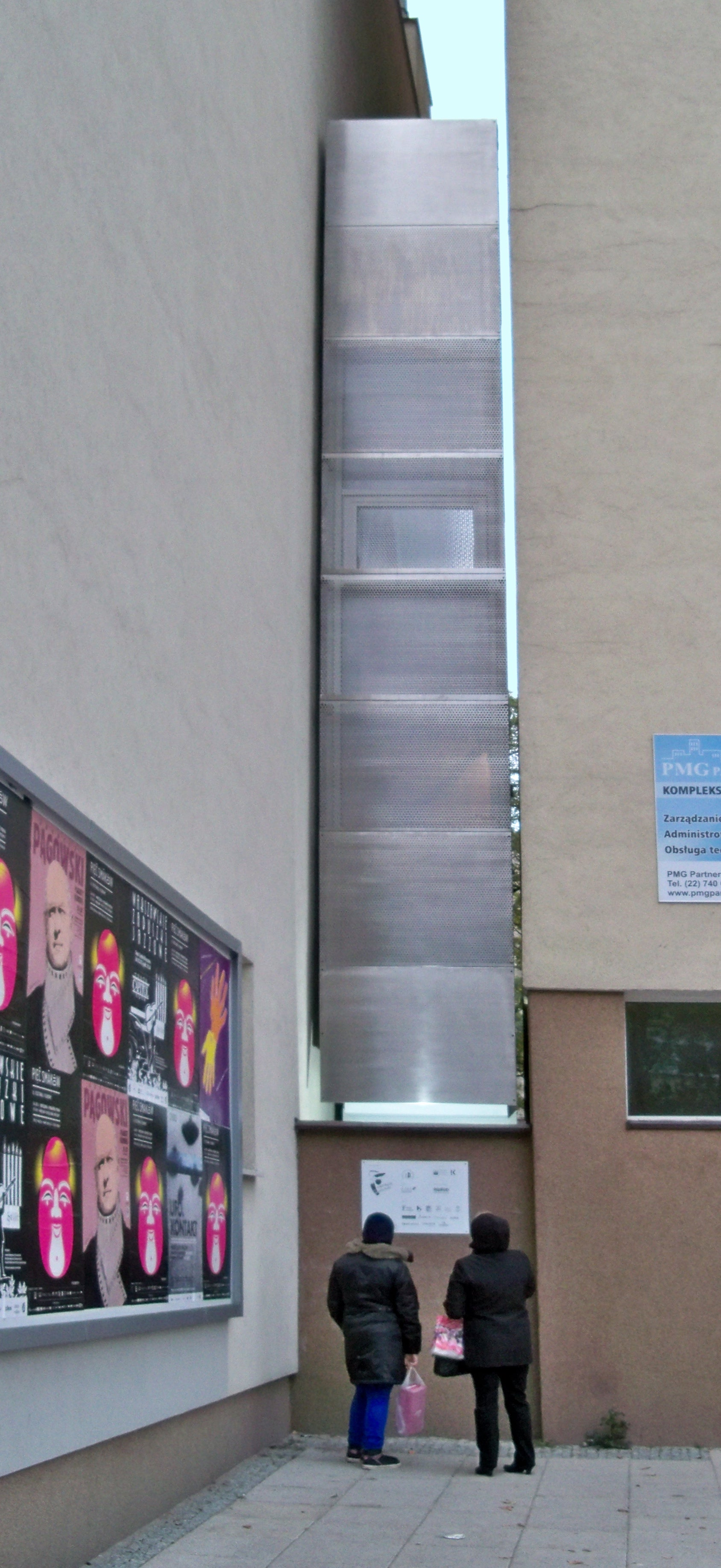
- The Keret House between two other buildings, as seen from the street
- Interactive map of the Keret House area
- Alternative names: Dom Kereta

General information
- Architectural style: Postmodern architecture
- Location: Warsaw, Poland
- Coordinates: 52.237703°N 20.989075°E
- Current tenants: Etgar Keret
- Construction started: 2012
- Completed: 2012

Technical details
- Floor count: 2
- Floor area: 4.09 m^{2}

Design and construction
- Architect: Jakub Szczęsny
- Main contractor: Polish Modern Art Foundation

Website
- kerethouse.com (archive)

Keret House is a structure and art installation in Warsaw, Poland. It was designed by the architect Jakub Szczęsny through the architecture firm Centrala, and has been described as the narrowest house in the world, measuring 92 centimetres (3.02 ft) at its thinnest point and 152 centimetres (4.99 ft) at its widest. The two-story art installation was named after Israeli writer and filmmaker Etgar Keret, who was the building's first tenant.

== Building ==
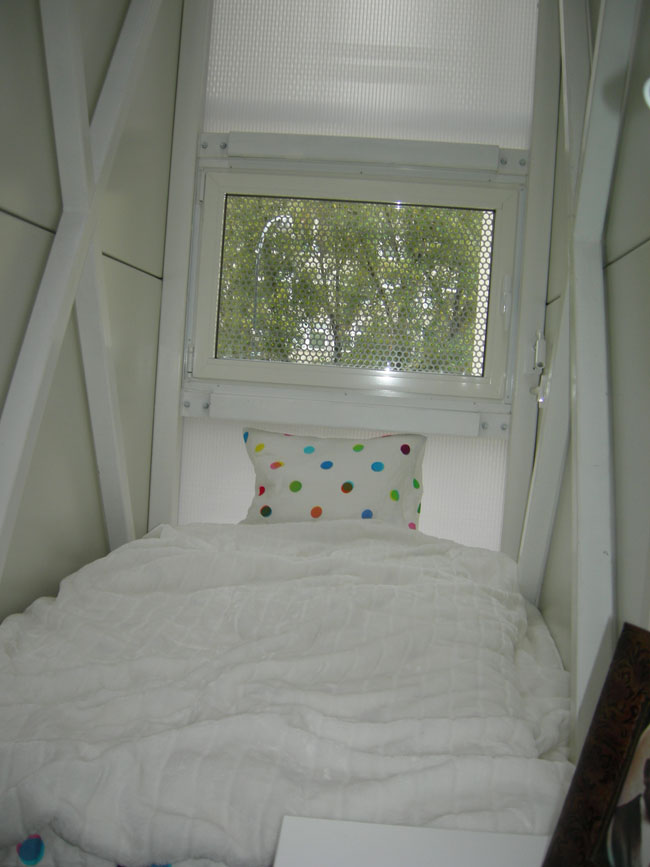
Inside Keret House – the bedroom

The iron structure contains two floors, and has one bedroom, a kitchen, a bathroom and a living area. It has two non-opening windows, with sunlight also entering through translucent glass panels that make up the walls. The entire interior is painted white and the building's electricity is obtained from a neighboring building. The house has custom water and sewage technology and is not connected to the city-provided water systems. Because of its small size, the building only accommodates a small 2-beverage refrigerator, and occupants use a ladder to travel from level to level. Entry is via retractable stairs that, when closed, become the living area.

The construction of the Keret House supported by the Warsaw Town Hall and was produced and realised by the Polish Modern Art Foundation. The house is classified as an "art installation" because it does not meet Polish building codes, even though it is being used as a residence.

In 2019, it was named as one of the most iconic houses in the world and included on a list of international projects honoured by the architecture portal Iconic Houses.

== Location ==
Keret House is located between 22 Chłodna Street and 74 Żelazna Street in Warsaw, and is designated as the narrowest house in the world. The structure was installed between a pre-war house and an apartment building. Keret said that staying at the Keret House is like a "memorial to my family"; his parents' families died in World War II when Nazi Germany occupied Poland.
