= Victoria Trauttmansdorff =

Austrian actress (born 1960)

- Born: 8 September 1960 (age 65); Vienna, Austria
- Occupation: Actress
- Years active: 1993-present

Victoria Trauttmansdorff (born 8 September 1960) is an Austrian actress. She has appeared in more than sixty films since 1993.

== Selected filmography ==
Year	Title	Role	Notes
2005	I Am Guilty	Marianne Steeb	
2005	Ghosts		
2007	Counterparts	Anne Hoffmann	
2011	Alive and Ticking	Mom Strumpf	
2012	Hannah Arendt		
2019	Der Pass	Johanna Stadlober	TV series
