= Manfred Günther =

Manfred Günther (born 1948 in Bochum) is a German educational psychologist, specialised in young people, the prevention of violence and social therapy methods; today he works as an author and coach. He lives in Berlin, Germany and La Palma, Spain.

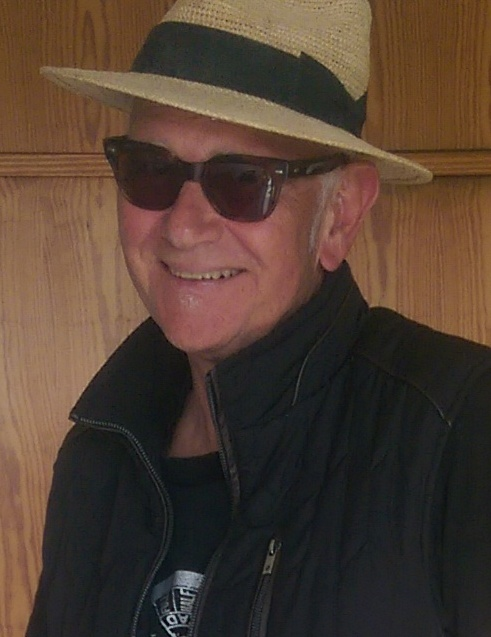
Manfred Günther Berlin 2020

== Career ==
At the beginning of his career, he discovered the psychological works of Frederick Kanfer and Heinz Heckhausen in Bochum and of Klaus Holzkamp and Eva Jaeggi in Berlin. He graduated in 1974. Günther is also an Economics-and-Work teacher, school psychologist, as well as being a dovish follower of cognitive behavioural therapy. Later, from 1984 to 1986 he studied Health Sciences at famed Professor Dieter Kleiber’s institute.

=== Professional Experience ===
In 1977, Günther became the director of a private residential treatment centre (therapeutic boarding school). In 1979, he discovered Sam Ferrainola's Camp, namely the Glen Mills Schools close to Philadelphia, discussed this with Howard W. Polsky in New York City. and got internships 1980 in Boston's famous counseling-team Bridge Over Troubled Waters and in the very special Robert White School. While travelling he inspected other psychosocial projects in countries like Denmark, Ukraine (USSR), Canada, Italy (and after 1990 in Hungary). After that, feeling inspired, Manfred founded and took charge of a consultancy for young people called "JOKER" in West Berlin's City in 1982, a position he held for 17 years. Later (2003–2006) he moved to the Bonn-institution "German Crime Prevention Forum (DFK)" to investigate and write surveys on "Prevention of violence for children in schools" after the first extreme German school shooting in Erfurt. From 2007 to 2013 he has been a consultant and in the emergency psychological service at the Ministry of Education, Youth and Sciences in Berlin (Federal State).

To discuss his ideas, Günther was being interviewed on radio- and TV channels such as SFB 2, SFB 3, Hallo, N 24 and ZDF-Moma. The Ministry of Education, School, Youth and Family Brandenburg commissioned Manfred Günther with the curriculum development Social Work (Youth)

=== Universities ===
For 40 years, Günther has worked beside his main occupations in four different universities of Berlin and from 2011 to 2015 in Magdeburg. His main subjects are "Rights of young people" and "Violence among pupils".

== Memberships ==
- 1977-1980: Trade union "OTV Berlin, executive board of the "churches group"
- 1993-1998: Member of the County Committee "Jugendhilfe" in Berlin
- 1992-2000: On the supervisory board of the "Pestalozzi-Fröbel-Haus"
- 1993-1997: Management team for "Humanistischer Verband Deutschlands, IHEU Berlin-Brandenburg"
- 1996-1998: Management team responsible for "Aktion 70"

Political Parties:

- 70s: Socialist Party
- 80s, 90s, 00s: Green Party
- 20s: Social Democratic Party

Today:

- "German Humanist Association / IHEU", member of arbitration committee, Berlin

== Bibliography ==
=== Selection from roughly 40 essays ===
- Disziplinierte Schüler durch Verhaltensmodifikation?, in: Klaus Ulich (Hrsg.): Wenn Schüler stören. Beltz, München 1980, ISBN 3-407-25071-1; Preview in: Demokratische Erziehung (3. Jg. Heft 1) 1977; once more in: Moll-Strobel, H. (Hrsg.) : „Die Problematik der Disziplinschwierigkeiten im Unterricht". Darmstadt 1982
- Alternative Konzepte für 'nichtbeschulbare' und delinquente Jugendliche in den USA, in: Sozialpädagogik (23) 1981. ISSN 0038-6189
- Psychosoziale Auswirkungen von Arbeitslosigkeit auf Jugendliche, in: Jugend – Beruf – Gesellschaft 4/1981; once more in: BAG Jugendaufbauwerk (Hrsg.): Jugendarbeitslosigkeit - Angebote der Jugendsozialarbeit zur Lösung eines drängenden Problems, Bonn 1982
- Hilfen für junge Volljährige nach SGB VIII § 41, in: Jugendhilfe 8/ 1993
- Prävention durch Sport, in: Forum Kriminalprävention. 2/ 2006

=== Research ===
- (with Kurt Kersten): Jugend in Wilmersdorf 1984. Eine empirische Studie zum Zeitbewußtsein, Freizeit- und Problemverhalten der Jugendlichen im Bezirk, Community of Berlin-Wilmersdorf 1985
- Psychodiagnostik, ambulante Therapie und Unterbringung in heilpädagogischen oder klinischen Einrichtungen. Eine Untersuchung über Indikationsprobleme bei Jugendlichen mit psychischen Störungen in psychosozialen Diensten, Berlin 1986
- (with Sebastian Braunert): Zur Situation der Erziehungs- und Familienberatungsstellen in Deutschland. Rahmenbedingungen, Prävention, Kooperation, Bonn 2005

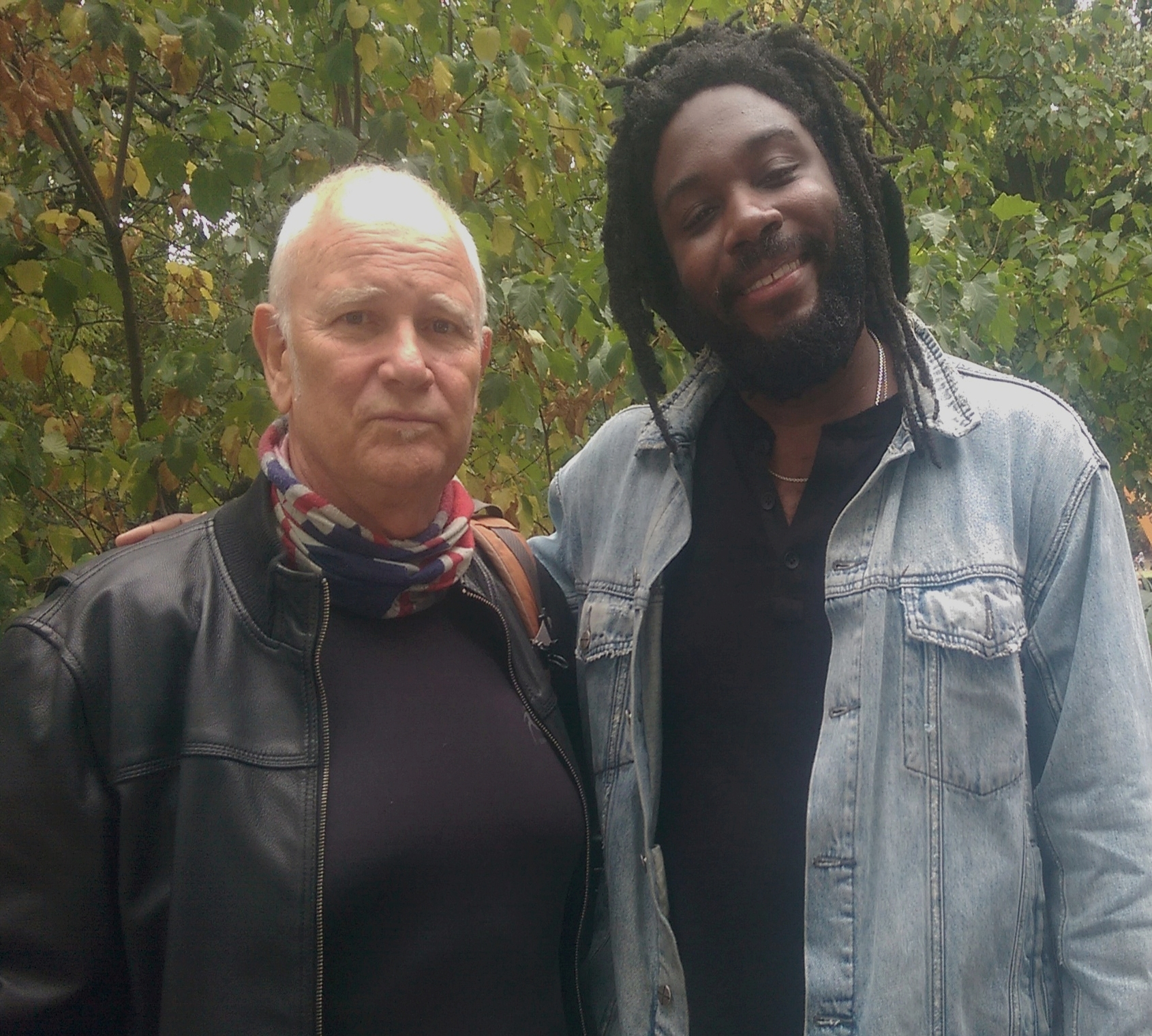
Günther meets Reynolds, Berlin Library Festival 2018.

=== Books (Selection) ===
- Mediation und Dialoge moderieren. Ein Leitfaden für Gesprächsleitungen in der Bildungsarbeit. Springer nature, 2025, 978-3-658-47565-9 (Print), 978-3-658-47566-6 (E-Book)
- Moderation kompakt. Praxisorientiert und zukunftsweisend für die psychosoziale Arbeit. Springer nature essentials, 2025, ISBN 3-658-47149-2 (Print), 978-3-658-47149-1 (E-Book).
- Educational Role Play. Knowledge Modul and Guide for Psychosocial Practice. Springer nature 2023 - E-book ISBN 978-3-658-41809-0
- Child and Youth Welfare Law in Germany. An overview for educators, psychologists, paediatricians and politicians, Springer Nature Wiesbaden 2022. ISBN 978-3-658-38289-6; E-book 978-3-658-3829-2
- Gewalt an Schulen – Prävention. Erprobte Programme, Positionen und Praxis-Projekte, Springer Group, Wiesbaden 2. Auflage 2021, ISBN 978-3-658-32578-7; E-Book 978-3-658-32579-4
- Kindheit - Jugend - Alter, HG Butzko prefacing, Rheine 2020 ISBN 978-3-946537-62-5
- Alles was jungen Menchen Recht ist. Sigrun von Hasseln-Grindel prefacing; Berlin 2019 ISBN 3-924041-23-7
- Pädagogisches Rollenspiel, Springer Essentials Wiesbaden 2018, 2019. ISBN 978-3-658-22792-0; e-Book 978-3-658-22793-7
- Hilfe! Jugendhilfe, Jörg M. Fegert prefacing; 528 p., Rheine 2018 ISBN 978-3-946-53755-7
- Jugendliche im Berliner Psychodschungel, Berlin 1987, ISBN 3-925399-03-8
