= Jörg Fegert =

German psychotherapist and author (b. 1956)

Jörg Michael Fegert (born 15 November 1956, Heilbronn) is a German child and adolescent psychiatrist, psychotherapist and university professor.

== Life and education ==
From 1977 to 1981, Fegert studied medicine and sociology at the University of Nantes and the Freie Universität of Berlin (FUB). He completed his specialist training at the Department of Child and Adolescent Neurology and Psychiatry and Psychotherapy of the FUB, at the Children's Hospital of the FUB and at the Psychiatric Hospital of the FUB. In 1987, he received his doctorate with a thesis on migration and psychosocial adaptation.

In 1991, he became a specialist in child and adolescent psychiatry and psychotherapy. He is also qualified as a specialist in adult psychosomatics and psychotherapy. In 1995 Fegert obtained the "venia legend" at the FUB. In 1997 Jörg M. Fegert moved to Rostock University and became head of the department for child and adolescent neuropsychiatry and psychotherapy at the medical faculty.

== Research and other activities ==
In 1998, Fegert became managing director of the Center for Mental Health Neurology at the Medical Faculty of the University of Rostock and remained there until 2001. Fegert is the founder and Medical Director of the Department of Child and Adolescent Psychiatry/Psychotherapy at the University of Ulm (continuously since 2001). His work focuses on child protection issues, in particular sexual abuse of children and adolescents. He is the founder of the Competence Center for Child Protection in Medicine of the German State of Baden-Württemberg. The main focus of the Center is the epidemiology of adverse childhood experiences and the dissemination of knowledge. Another focus of his work is participation, integration and inclusion of children and adolescents with different and multiple forms of disability. He has also influenced the social legal development in this field of youth welfare in Germany since 1990. Since the introduction of the UN Convention on the Rights of Persons with Disabilities, he has advocated, for example, a stronger consideration of the traumatic background of children in institutions in youth welfare in an expert opinion on the 13th Report on Children and Adolescents of the German Federal Ministry for Family Affairs, Senior Citizens, Women and Youth in Germany.

In 2010, in response to a child sexual abuse scandal in Germany, Fegert served as an expert member on the round table on child sexual abuse and was in charge of the accompanying research of the official contact point of the government's Independent Commissioner for Child Sexual Abuse Issues. Since then, he has been in charge of the accompanying research for the helpline of the current Independent Commissioner for Sexual Child Abuse Issues (UBSKM) J. W. Rörig. He has also been a member of the Advisory Board of the Independent Commissioner since its constitution.

Two of the main areas of focus of his work at the University of Ulm are e-learning activities and the establishment of interactive platforms, e.g. a complaints platform for students at the University of Ulm within the suggestion and complaint management. Another e-learning program was developed for the Centre for Child Protection at the Pontifical University of Gregoriana and is having a worldwide impact. An online overview of two main topics dissemination and knowledge transfer also exists.

Fegert is the head of the Competence Center Child Abuse and Neglect (com.can), which was initially funded by the Ministry of Science, Research and the Arts of the state of Baden-Württemberg for several years and was consolidated in 2016 with the establishment of two professorships at the Department for Child and Adolescent Psychiatry/Psychotherapy at the University Hospital Ulm. He is the project manager of the Medical Child Protection Hotline funded by the Federal Ministry for Family Affairs, Senior Citizens, Women, and Youth, which offers practical advice in individual child protection cases for healthcare professionals. The prevention and intervention strategy for child protection with individual counseling and courses that include practical cases and are digitally disseminated, was highlighted by the WHO in the Status Report on the Prevention of Child Abuse in Europe (Sethi et al., 2018) as a positive example and was, after only one year in practice, described as a success story. He is co-founder and co-spokesperson of the Center for Trauma Research at the University of Ulm, a transdisciplinary initiative to improve research on the effects of physical and psychological trauma, and the interaction between physical injuries and psychological trauma. The Baden-Württemberg Ministry of Science, Research and the Arts also supported this initiative with a permanent professorship, the first professorship for trauma and acute child and adolescent psychiatry/psychotherapy in Germany. After serving six years as deputy chairman of the Scientific Advisory Board for Family Issues at the Federal Ministry for Family Affairs, Senior Citizens, Women, and Youth, Fegert became the chairman of the board in 2017.

Fegert founded the first open-access online journal in child and adolescent mental health with support by a grant from the German research fund. He founded the Dreiländerinstitut Jugend-Familie-Gesellschaft-Recht GmbH in Switzerland, which offers professional expertise, consulting services, content development for e-learning programs, coaching in crisis situations and continuing education in German-speaking countries, i.e. in Switzerland, Austria and Germany. He sold the institute in 2016 but supports it with his expertise.

In 2018, Fegert was awarded the Federal Cross of Merit on Ribbon of the Federal Republic of Germany.

== Memberships ==
- Former president and congress president of the German Society for Child and Adolescent Psychiatry, Psychosomatics and Psychotherapy
- Chairman of the Scientific Advisory Board for Family Affairs at the Federal Ministry for Family Affairs, Senior Citizens, Women and Youth
- Vice-Chairman of the "Aktion Psychisch Kranke"
- chairman of the board of Trustees of the Foundation "Achtung Kinderseele“
- Head of the Competence Center Child Abuse and Neglect (com.can)
- Speaker of the Center for Trauma Research at University of Ulm (ZTF)
- Vice President of the German Trauma Foundation
- Member of the German Committee for UNICEF
- Expert commission on child protection in the state of Baden-Württemberg

== Bibliography (selection) ==
=== Selected peer-reviewed English journal articles ===
- Brown RC, Plener PL, Braehler E, Fegert JM, Huber-Lang M (2018) Association of adverse childhood experiences and bullying on physical pain in the general population of Germany. J Pain Res 11:3099–3108. doi: 10.2147/JPR.S169135
- Allroggen, M., Ohlert, J., Rau, T. & Fegert, J.M. 2017, "Sexual Violence by Juveniles in Institutions: A Descriptive Study on Prevalence and Circumstances", International Journal of Offender Therapy and Comparative Criminology, vol. 62, pp. 1806–1820.
- Allroggen, M., Rau, T., Ohlert, J. & Fegert, J. 2017, "Lifetime prevalence and incidence of sexual victimization of adolescents in institutional care", Child abuse & neglect., vol. 66, pp. 23–30.
- Bastert, E., Schläfke, D., Pein, A., Kupke, F. & Fegert, J. 2012, "Mentally challenged patients in a forensic hospital: a feasibility study concerning the executive functions of forensic patients with organic brain disorder, learning disability, or mental retardation", International journal of law and psychiatry., vol. 35, no. 3, pp. 207–12.
- Brown, R., Witt, A., Fegert, J., Keller, F., Rassenhofer, M. & Plener, P. 2017, "Psychosocial interventions for children and adolescents after man-made and natural disasters: a meta-analysis and systematic review", Psychological medicine, vol. 47, no. 11, pp. 1893–1905.
- Fegert, J.M., Diehl, C., Leyendecker, B., Hahlweg, K. & Prayon, V. 2018, "Psychosocial problems in traumatized refugee families: an overview of risks and some recommendations for support services", Child and Adolescent Psychiatry and Mental Health (online journal www.capmh.com), vol. 12, no. 5.
- Fegert, J.M. & Plener, P.L. 2012, "Non-suicidal self-injury state of the art perspective of a proposed new syndrome for DSM V", Child and adolescent psychiatry and mental health, vol. 6, no. 9.
- Fegert JM, Kölch M, Zito, M.J., Glaeske, G. & Janhsen, K. 2006, "Antidepressant Use in Children and Adolescents in Germany", Journal of Child and Adolescent Psychopharmacology, vol. 16, no. 1/2 2006, pp. 197–206.
- Habersaat, S., Raiman, J., Mantzouranis, G., Palix, J., Boonman, C., Fegert, J.M., Schmeck, C., Perler, C., Schmid, M. & Urben, S. 2018, "Substance-use disorders, personality traits, and sex differences in institutionalized adolescents", The American Journal of Drug and Alcohol Abuse, .
- Habetha, S., Bleich, S., Weidenhammer, J. & Fegert, J.M. 2012, "A prevalence-based approach to societal costs occurring in consequence of child abuse and neglect", Child and adolescent psychiatry and mental health, vol. 6, no. 1, pp. 35.
- Kölch, M., Pfalzer, A., Kliegl, K., Rothenhöfer, S., Ludolph, A., Fegert, J., Burger, R., Mehler-Wex, C., Stingl, J., Taurines, R., Egberts, K. & Gerlach, M. 2012, "Therapeutic drug monitoring of children and adolescents treated with fluoxetine", Pharmacopsychiatry, vol. 45, no. 2, pp. 72–6.
- Leenarts, L.E.W., Dölitzsch, C., Pérez, T., Schmeck, K., Fegert, J.M. & Schmid, M. 2017, "The relationships between gender, psychopathic traits and self-reported delinquency: a comparison between a general population sample and a high-risk sample for juvenile delinquency", Child and Adolescent Psychiatry and Mental Health, vol. 64, no. 11.
- Lüdtke, J., In-Albon, T., Schmeck, K., Plener, P.L., Fegert, J.M. & Schmid, M. 2018, "Nonsuicidal Self-Injury in Adolescents Placed in Youth Welfare", Journal of Abnormal Child Psychology, vol. 46, pp. 343–354.
- Maier, A.T., Brown, R.C. & Fegert, J.M. 2018, "Knowledge transfer: a worldwide challenge in child mental health: a recommendation to the readership of CAPMH concerning the revised version of the IACAPAP Textbook of Child and Adolescent Mental Health", Child and Adolescent Psychiatry and Mental Health (online journal www.capmh.com), vol. 12, no. 14.
- March JS & Fegert JM 2012, "Drug development in pediatric psychiatry: current status, future trends", Child and adolescent psychiatry and mental health, vol. 6, no. 7.
- Merkel, R., Boer, G., Fegert JM, Galert, T., Hartmann, D., Nuttin, B. & Rosahl, S. (eds) 2007, Intervening in the Brain – Changing Psyche and Society, 1st edn, Springer, Berlin, Heidelberg.
- Ohlert, J., Seidler, C., Rau, T., Fegert, J. & Allroggen, M. 2017, "Comparison of Psychopathological Symptoms in Adolescents Who Experienced Sexual Violence as a Victim and/or as a Perpetrator", Journal of child sexual abuse., vol. 26, no. 4, pp. 373–387.
- Rassenhofer, M., Spröber, N., Schneider, T. & Fegert, J.M. 2013, "Listening to victims: Use of a Critical Incident Reporting System to enable adult victims of childhood sexual abuse to participate in a political reappraisal process in Germany", Child Abuse & Neglect, vol. Vol 37, no. 9, pp. 654–663.
- Rassenhofer, M., Spröber-Kolb, N., Plener, P.L., Kölch, M. & Fegert, J.M. 2017, "Child Sexual Abuse in Religiously Affiliated and Secular Institutions in Germany" in Child Maltreatment in Residential Care – History, Research, and Current Practice, eds. A.V. Rus, S.R. Parris & E. Stativa, 1st edn, Springer International Publishing AG, Switzerland, pp. 169–177.
- Rassenhofer, M., Zimmer, A., Spröber, N. & Fegert, J.M. 2015, "Child sexual abuse in the Roman Catholic Church in Germany: Comparison of victim-impact data collected through church-sponsored and government-sponsored programs", Child Abuse & Neglect, no. 40, pp. 60–67.
- Schmid, M., Petermann, F. & Fegert, J.M. 2013, "Developmental trauma disorder: pros and cons of including formal criteria in the psychiatric diagnostic systems", BMC Psychiatry, vol. 13, no. 3.
- Spröber-Kolb, N., Rassenhofer, M., Allroggen, M., Plener, P.L., Kölch, M. & Fegert, J.M. 2017, "Research on Child Sexual Abuse in Institutions in German-Speaking Countries: A Summary" in Child Maltreatment in Residential Care – History, Research, and Current Practice, eds. A.V. Rus, S.R. Parris & E. Stativa, 1st edn, Springer International Publishing AG, Switzerland, pp. 179–197.
- Witt, A., Münzer, A., Ganser, H.G., Fegert, J.M., Goldbeck, L. & Plener, P.L. 2016, "Experience by children and adolescent of more than one type of maltreatment: Association of different classes of maltreatment profiles with clinical outcome variables", Child Abuse & Neglect, vol. 57, pp. 1–11.
- Witte, S., Fegert, J.M. & Walper, S. 2018, "Risk of Maltreatment for siblings: Factors associated with similar and different childhood experiences in a dyadic sample of adult siblings", Child Abuse & Neglect, no. 76, pp. 321–333.
- Zollner, H., Fuchs, K.A. & Fegert, J.M. 2014, "Prevention of sexual abuse: improved information is crucial.", Child & Adolescent Psychiatry & Mental Health, vol. 8, no. 5, pp. 1–9.

=== Journals ===
- Jörg M. Fegert is the Editor in Chief of the Online-Journal Child and Adolescent Psychiatry and Mental Health CAPMH.
- Editor in Chief of the Journal of Child and Adolescent Psychopharmacology.

=== Books ===
- Was ist seelische Behinderung? Anspruchsgrundlage und kooperative Umsetzung von Hilfen nach § 35a KJHG. Votum, Münster 1994, ISBN 3-930405-20-2.
- (with Theo Frühauf): Integration von Kindern mit Behinderungen. Seelische, geistige und körperliche Behinderung. Verlag Deutsches Jugendinstitut, München 1999, ISBN 3-87966-394-7.
- (with Christina Berger, Uta Klopfer, Ulrike Lehmkuhl and Gerd Lehmkuhl): Umgang mit sexuellem Mißbrauch. Institutionelle und individuelle Reaktionen. Votum, Münster 2001, ISBN 3-933158-70-2.
- (with Mechtild Wolff): Sexueller Missbrauch durch Professionelle in Institutionen. 2. Ed.: Juventa-Verlag, Weinheim/München 2006, ISBN 978-3-7799-1816-5.
- (with Mechthild Wolff and Wolfgang Schröer): "Schutzkonzepte in Theorie und Praxis: Ein beteiligungsorientiertes Werkbuch“. 1. Ed. 2017, Beltz Juventa. ISBN 978-3-7799-3470-7

=== Textbooks ===
- (with Eggers, C. and Resch, F.): Psychiatrie und Psychotherapie des Kindes- und Jugendalters. Springer-Verlag Berlin Heidelberg, Berlin 2012, 2. Ed., ISBN 978-3-642-19846-5.
- (with Kölch, M.): Klinikmanual Kinder- und Jugendpsychiatrie und -psychotherapie, 2. Auflage, Springer-Verlag, Berlin Heidelberg 2013, ISBN 978-3-642-37309-1.
- (with Streeck-Fischer, A. and Freyberger, H.J.): Adoleszenzpsychiatrie Psychiatrie und Psychotherapie der Adoleszenz und des jungen Erwachsenenalters, 2. Ed., Schattauer, Stuttgart 2009.
- (with Reinhard Wiesner, Helga Oberloskamp, Thomas Mörsberger, Jutta Struck and Heike Schmid-Obkirchner): SGB VIII – Kinder- und Jugendhilfe. (Annotation) 4. Ed., 1711 p., München 2011, ISBN 978-3-406-59710-7.
- (with Miriam Rassenhofer, Thekla Schneider, Alexander Seitz and Nina Spröber): Sexueller Kindesmissbrauch – Zeugnisse, Botschaften, Konsequenzen. Beltz Juventa, 1. Ed. 2013, ISBN 978-3-7799-2264-3.

=== Others ===
- Manfred Günther: Hilfe! Jugendhilfe. 40 Schriften, 528 S., (Preface by Jörg M. Fegert); Rheine 2018; ISBN 978-3-946-53755-7

== Critical receptions ==
- Axel Rathschlag via socialnet: J.M.F. Umgang mit sexuellem Mißbrauch
- Lothar Sandfort via socialnet: J.F.M. Sexuelle Selbstbestimmung und sexuelle Gewalt
