= Kadri Kõusaar =

Estonian writer, film director

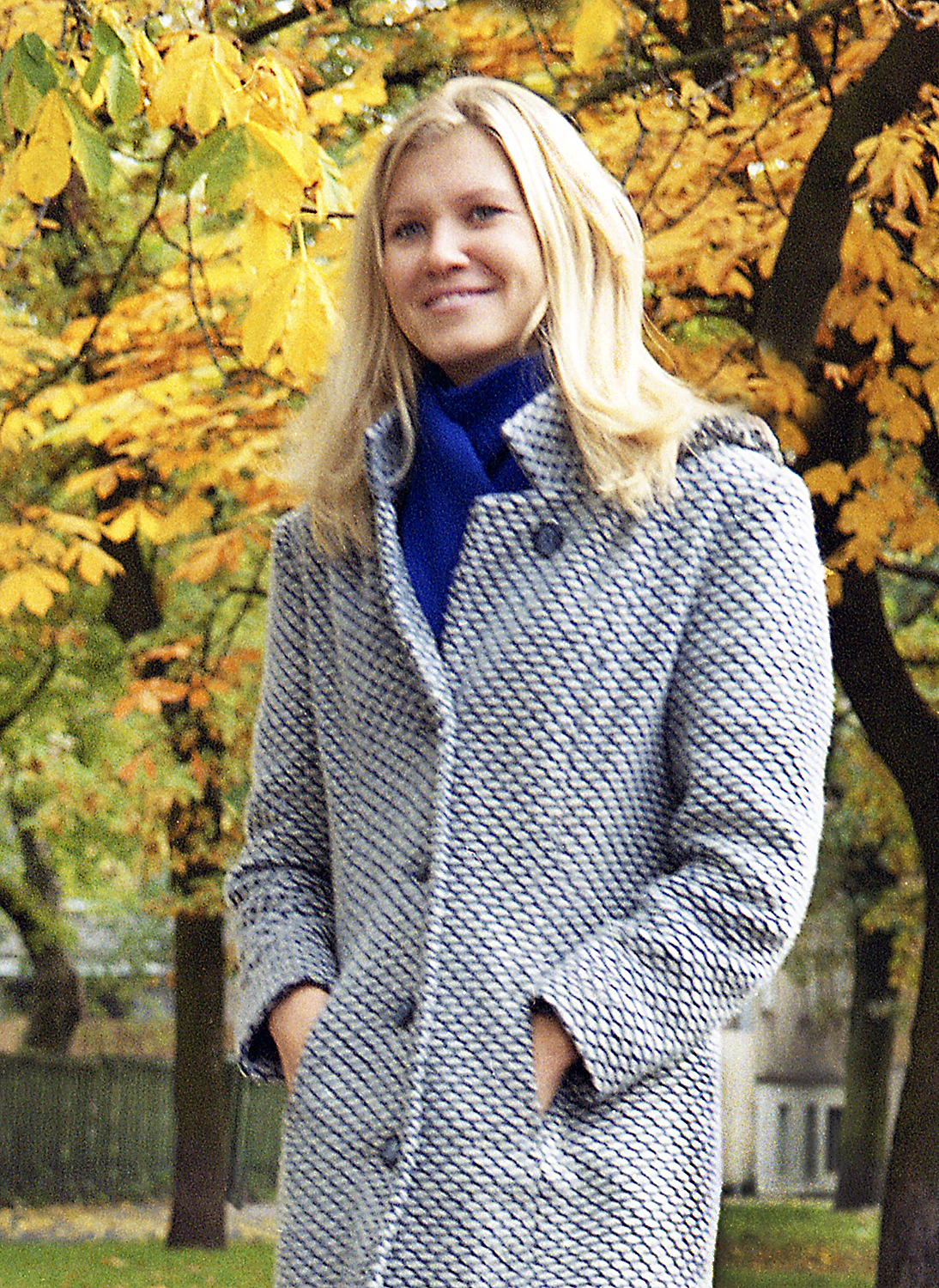
Kadri Kõusaar

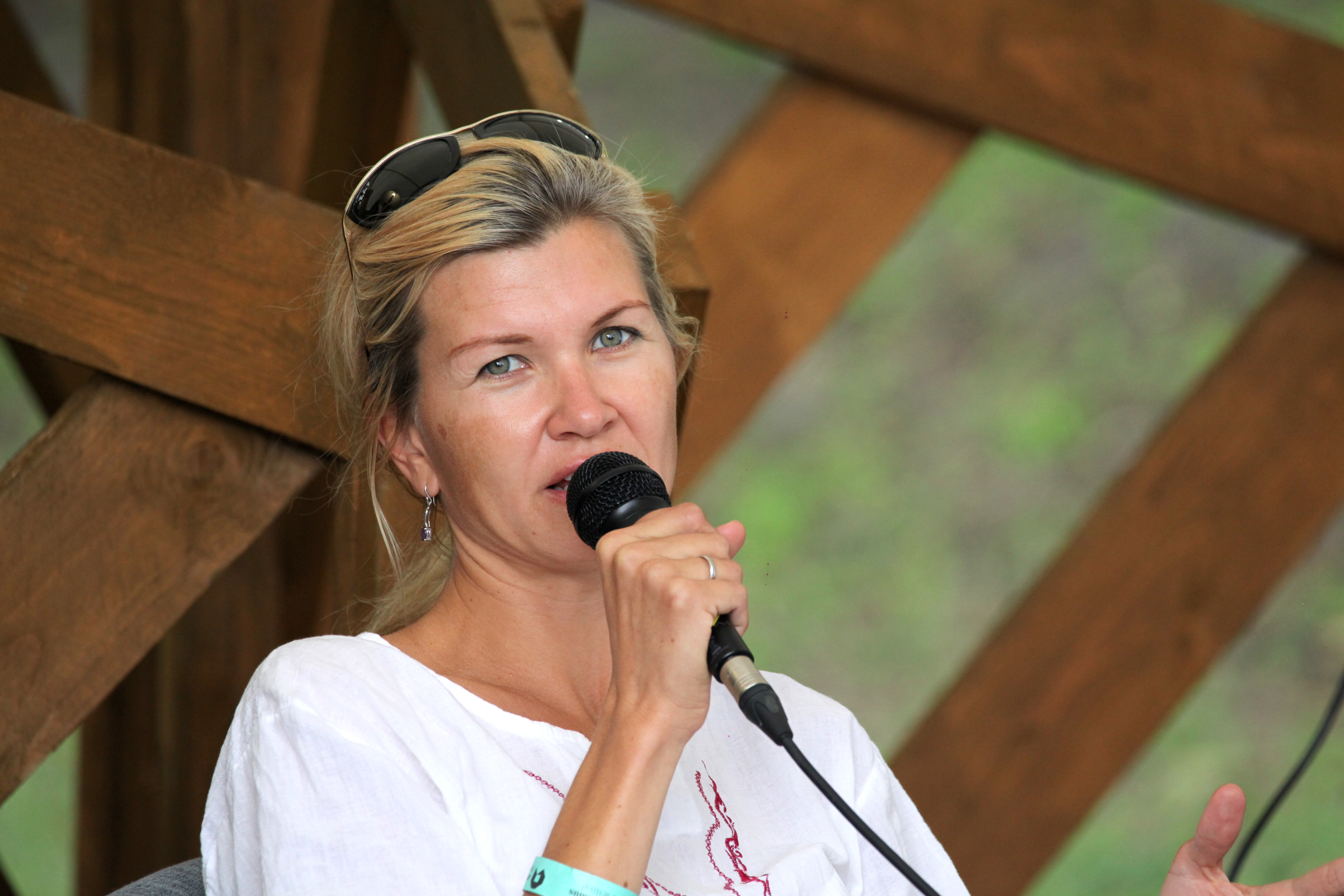
Kadri Kõusaar at the Opinion Festival 2021 in Paide, Estonia

Kadri Kõusaar (born 8 September 1980 in Pärnu) is an Estonian writer, film director, translator and television presenter.

She has been literary editor for Eesti Ekspress cultural supplement. She has hosted the television programs Mandolino (with Alex Lepajõe), and in 2011 Seks ja küla.

== Works ==
=== Novels ===
- 2001: Ego
- 2004: Vaba tõus
- 2011: Alfa

=== Filmography ===
- 2007: Magnus (feature film)
- 2013: Kohtumõistja
- 2014: Auster (short feature film)
- 2016: Ema ('Mother')
- 2021: Deserted
