= Mimi Freedman =

American documentary filmmaker

Mimi Freedman is an American documentary filmmaker who specializes in films about Hollywood history. She is best known for the 2005 documentary Steve McQueen: The Essence of Cool, and has produced films for A&E Biography, AMC Backstory, and Lifetime Intimate Portrait. She directed a documentary about Marlon Brando for Turner Classic Movies, for which she was nominated for an Emmy Award.

Freedman was born in Toledo, Ohio in 1961. She earned her bachelor's degree at the University of Michigan and went on to earn a master's degree at the University of California, Los Angeles.
