= Jellyfish (2007 film) =

2007 filmnby Shira Geffen and Etgar Keret

- Theatrical release poster
- מדוזות
- Directed by: Etgar Keret; Shira Geffen
- Written by: Shira Geffen
- Produced by: Amir Harel; Ayelet Kait; Yaël Fogiel; Laetitia Gonzalez
- Starring: Sarah Adler; Nikol Leidman; Gera Sandler; Noa Knoller; Ma-nenita De Latorre; Zharira Charifai
- Cinematography: Antoine Héberlé
- Edited by: Sasha Franklin; François Gédigier
- Music by: Christopher Bowen
- Distributed by: Pyramide Distribution
- Release date: June 28, 2007
- Running time: 78 minutes
- Countries: Israel; France
- Languages: Hebrew; English; Tagalog; German

Jellyfish (Hebrew: מדוזות; Meduzot) is a 2007 drama film based on a story by Shira Geffen and directed by Etgar Keret. The film tells the story of three women in Tel Aviv whose intersecting lives paint a pessimistic portrait of Israeli secular life. Batya, a waitress at weddings, comes across a mute child who seemingly emerges from the sea. Keren, a bride whose wedding Batya worked at, breaks her leg climbing out of bathroom stall and ruins her dream honeymoon in the process. And Joy, a Filipina domestic, attends to her employer with whom she struggles to communicate. Poetic imagery draws connections between the lives of these women, all of whom find solace in the sea.

Jellyfish was the winner of the 2007 Camera d'Or at the Cannes Film Festival, an official selection of the 2008 Toronto International Film Festival, and an official selection of the 2008 Telluride Film Festival. The film stars Sarah Adler and Gera Sandler. The DVD release date was September 30, 2008.

== Themes ==
The film begins and ends with the little girl in the presence of the film's main character, Batya, at sea. Batya is a young woman who carries herself with an extremely independent nature. She works as a waitress at a wedding catering company. The film jumps from past to present day, showing flashbacks to Batya's childhood amidst her parents’ divorce and father's infidelity at the beach. Batya seems to identify with the toddler she finds coming out of the sea, although it is unclear whether or not the toddler is real, or a figment of Batya's imagination. However, this is not a crucial element of the film. The film ends with her following the tot into the sea, almost drowning. Instead her friend Malka pulls her out. She is revived, appearing relieved to find that she still has her friend.

Another character, Keren, is a new bride whose wedding Batya works at. Although the film follows the story lines of both Batya and Keren, they never intertwine. As the film develops, Keren navigates through feelings of mistrust and containment during her honeymoon. After breaking her leg at her wedding, she is unable to walk and relies on her new husband to carry her when leaving the hotel room. He smokes on the stairwell near their hotel room and meets a mysterious women who changes his perspective and causes argument between him and Keren.

== Critical reception ==
The film received generally positive reviews from Western critics. The review aggregator Rotten Tomatoes reported that 88% of critics gave the film positive reviews, based on 49 reviews. Metacritic reported the film had an average score of 68 out of 100, based on 11 reviews.
