= Jan Bonny =

German film director and screenwriter

- Born: 1979 (age 46–47); Düsseldorf, West Germany
- Occupations: Film director and Screenplay writer
- Years active: 2003 - present

Jan Bonny (born 1979 in Düsseldorf) is a German film director and screenwriter.

== Life and work ==
Jan Bonny studied from 2000 to 2006 at the Academy of Media Arts Cologne and finished his study with the screenplay for his award-winning feature film Counterparts (Gegenüber), which was nominated for the European Film Award and for the Caméra d'Or at the 2007 Cannes Film Festival. In 2009 he participated in the Binger Filmlab in Amsterdam and the TorinoFilmLab in Turin.

Furthermore, Jan Bonny realized with advertising agencies like DDB Worldwide, Saatchi & Saatchi, Jung von Matt and Ogilvy & Mather a lot of commercials. Initially, the commercials were created in collaboration with the German film director and author Sonja Heiss under the alias Sonny & Bonny.

Bonny's feature film Germany. A Winter's Tale (Wintermärchen) celebrated its world premiere in 2018 at the Locarno Film Festival, where the film was nominated for the Golden Leopard.

== Filmography (selection) ==
- 2004: 2nd and A (short film), (screenplay, director)
- 2007: Counterparts (Gegenüber), (screenplay and director)
- 2013: Polizeiruf 110 - Der Tod macht Engel aus uns allen (TV series), (director)
- 2018: Germany. A Winter's Tale (Wintermärchen), (screenplay and director)
- 2019: Jupp, watt hamwer jemaht? (screenplay and director)
- 2020: Tatort - Ich hab im Traum geweinet (TV series), director

== Awards and nominations (selection) ==
- Hirsch (2003)
  - 2003: First Steps Awards - Nomination for Hirsch in the category Best Commercial
- Counterparts (2007)
  - 2007: European Film Awards - Nomination for European Discovery of the Year
  - 2007: Cannes Film Festival - Nomination for Caméra d'Or
  - 2007: Cannes Film Festival - Special Mention by the CICAE Jury Cannes
- Polizeiruf 110 - Der Tod macht Engel aus uns allen (2014)
  - 2014: Nomination for the German television award Grimme-Preis in the category Fiction
- Germany. A Winter's Tale (2018)
  - 2018: São Paulo International Film Festival - Nomination in the category New Directors competition
  - 2018: Cologne Conference - NRW Film Award
  - 2018: Locarno Festival - Nomination for Golden Leopard
  - 2020: German Film Critics Association Awards - Winner Best Film
  - 2020: German Film Critics Association Awards - Nomination for Best Screenplay
