= Elisa Miller =

Mexican film director

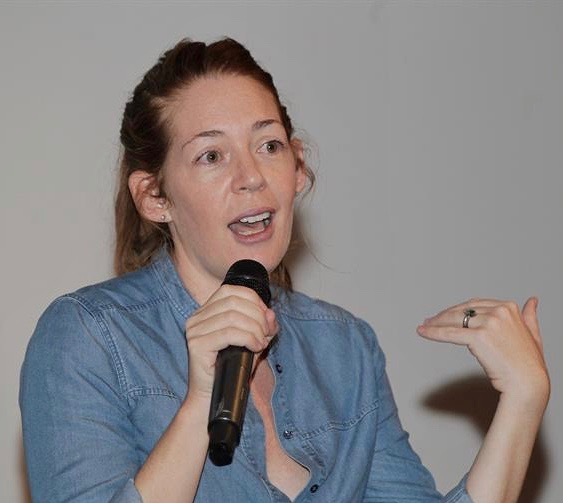
- Born: Elisa Miller Encinas; July 1982 (age 43); Mexico City, Mexico
- Education: Film directing; English Literature
- Alma mater: Centro de Capacitación Cinematográfica; National Autonomous University of Mexico
- Occupations: Filmmaker; Producer; Writer
- Years active: 2006–present
- Notable work: Ver Llover; Roma; El Placer es Mío

Elisa Miller Encinas is a Mexican award-winning film director, writer, and producer. She studied English literature at the National Autonomous University of Mexico (UNAM) and film direction at the Centro de Capacitación Cinematográfica (CCC) in Mexico City. She is the first and only Mexican female filmmaker to win the Golden Palm for a short fiction feature at the Cannes Film Festival. Her first short film Ver Llover (Watching It Rain, 2006) was nationally and internationally awarded in 2007.

== Early life and education ==
Elisa Miller was born in Mexico City, Mexico in July 1982. Miller was introduced to the world of cinema at a very young age. Her grandmother, a French resident established in Paris, told her stories about her experiences of attending French movie theaters and watching films from well-known authors, including Claire Denis and the Belgian director Chantal Akerman, a filmmaker that became a source of inspiration in her later works and career as a director. Furthermore, as a member of a family of film casting workers, she was early exposed to different aspects of pre-production in the Mexican film industry. Nonetheless, this rich film background did not initially motivate Miller to study film.

At age 19 and after earning her high school diploma in Mexico City, Miller began her higher education studies in philosophy at the Aix-Marseille University in France. Yet after a few months of struggle with the language and dislike for her chosen major, she decided to drop school and return to Mexico City.

During her time in France, Miller was once again exposed to cinema. In addition to the upper division courses that she studied at Aix-Marseille, she enrolled in numerous film history electives that, for the first time, excited her about the possibility to major in film. This idea was reinforced after studying the works of Latin American filmmakers, particularly the Argentinian director Lucrecia Martel in her film La Ciénaga (The Swamp, 2001). With figures like Akerman and Martel, Miller realized that “[she] could also make films [based on] what [she] knew” and that being a woman was not an impediment to do it. After her return to Mexico and after earning her degree in English literature at the National Autonomous University of Mexico (UNAM), Miller applied and got accepted into the Centro de Capacitación Cinematográfica (CCC) where she earned her degree in cinematography and film directing.

== Career ==
Miller's career as a recognized filmmaker began years before earning her bachelor's degree in film. While she was still a student at the CCC, she produced the short film Ver Llover (2007) for one of her production classes. Ver Llover narrates the story of two inseparable friends, Jonah and Sophia, whose relationship deteriorates as Sophia decides to leave her hometown and Jonah struggles to decide whether to follow his friend or stay with his stagnant mother at a family-owned hotel. Even though her film did not do well as an assignment and was highly criticized by her classmates, she decided to submit it to the 4º Morelia International Film Festival (FICM). The film was nominated and awarded in the category of Best Fiction Short Film. Encouraged by her relatives and close friends, and after seeing the short film's success in Mexico, Miller converted her film into a 35 millimeters copy and submitted it to the 60º edition of the Cannes Film Festival. Ver Llover was awarded the Short Film Golden Palm in 2007 and Miller became the first Mexican female director to receive the prize.

Following the success of Ver Llover, Miller produces her senior thesis Roma (2008). Taking a humanitarian approach, Roma narrates the story of a worker who finds and helps a woman illegally traveling inside a train that arrives at the soap factory where he works. The short film also ended up being a national and international success and helped her to establish her reputation as a promising filmmaker in her country of origin. Roma won the Studio 5 de Mayo Special prize at the 6º Morelia International Film Festival (FICM) in Mexico, the Best Short Film Price at the 10º IMAGO - International Youth Film Festival in Portugal, the Best Director Price for student projects at the 8º Pune International Film Festival (PIFF) in India, and an honorific mention at the 12º Guanajuato International Film Festival (GIFF), also in Mexico.
In 2010 and as a response to the social pressures and expectations regarding her future projects, Miller released her first full-length film Vete Más Lejos, Alicia (Alicia, Go Yonder, 2010), which tells the story of a young woman who escapes from home as a result of family pressures regarding her professional future. Sylvia Plath's The Bell Jar has been argued by Miller to be an inspiration for the project. The film was internationally released during the 40º editions of the International Film Festival Rotterdam and it was nominated for the Tiger Award, the maximum price at the Dutch festival. Despite its success in Europe, the film was neither appraised nor nationally distributed in Mexico. Some film critics at the Morelia International Film Festival went even further into calling it a mediocre work. These responses had an emotional impact on Miller's career.

Four years later and after meeting the English artist Sarah Lucas during her art exhibitions in Mexico, Elisa Miller directed and produced her first documentary film, About Sarah (2014). This documentary exposes the life of Sarah Lucas over a period of one year, including her artistic work and personal life. The film was distributed in both the United Kingdom and Mexico; however, it was only released in a few theaters in the latter. The same year, Miller collaborated as the producer executive for Gustavo Gamou's documentary El Regreso del Muerto (The Return of the Dead, 2014), a film that narrates the life of a man who fakes his death in order to escape from the organized crime. This was the first time that Miller produced a film that she did not direct.

In 2015, Miller participated once again in the 13º Morelia International Film Festival (FICM) with her second full-length film El Placer es Mío (The Pleasure is Mine, 2015), a film that portrays the difficulties of adult relationships. Although Miller's work obtained mixed responses, especially due to the audience's reaction to the unconventional and explicit display of masculine nudity, the film was awarded the Best First/Second Feature Film Award.

In addition to continuing working in film treatments and scripts for future projects, in 2018 Miller began to work as an instructor at the Escuela Itinerante de Cine y Narrativa Audiovisual in Mexico City. Her workshops are focused on film directing, screenwriting, and montage. Her classes seek to enhance the development of personal ideas through introspection, which is a technique that she has utilized in her filmmaking career.

In 2022, it was announced that Miller will direct a film adaptation of Fernanda Melchor's 2017 novel Hurricane Season, produced by Netflix.

== Themes and styles ==
=== Themes ===
Despite the variety of topics explored on her narratives, ranging from adolescence to adulthood conflicts, Elisa Miller's films are characterized by a focus on human solitude and the internal struggles for decision making, particularly under external pressures. Miller has expressed that these two subjects are commonly depicted in her cinema because of how meaningful and relevant they are in her personal and professional life. The exploration of these personal themes through film, which she defines as an Art Therapy method, enables her to “dig into her inner emotions [and] reflect about the reasons behind [her] life experiences.”

Nevertheless, isolation and pressures are not the only subjects of Miller's films. As a feminist filmmaker and a fervent defender of women's inclusion in the Mexican film industry, Miller has also focused on exploring women's leadership in her film. With the exception of El Placer es Mío, where the main female character is shown confined by choice to a despondent relationship, the rest of her films and short films have shown a stronger and determined portrayal of female roles as they live their daily lives. In her films, including Ver Llover, Vete más lejos, Alicia and her documentary About Sarah, women are shown as brave and persevering individuals willing to follow their objectives as they challenge patriarchal beliefs. Further, due to her primary collaboration with female cinematographers and screenwriters, including María Secco and Gabriela Vidal respectively, her films share a feminine perspective.

=== Styles ===
Elisa Miller's films are characterized by its documentary style. As a great admirer of Chantal Akerman's works, especially the film News From Home (1977), Miller has tried to incorporate formal documentary qualities in her narratives. She seeks to create films that “[lie] in between the thin border of documentary and fiction,” by including spontaneous events that not always follow the original script. This aspect can be seen in films like Vete Más Lejos, Alicia where Miller allowed the film events to happen organically, and captured non-planned phenomena as they traverse the filming locations:

“[Vete más lejos, Alicia], we had really clear the geographic journey of the character and, of course, the emotions that we wanted to portray. However, a lot of stuff was [spontaneous] Look at that light! Look how the dirt is moving! Let's film! […] Many elements were only thought by looking at them physically […] at the moment. I don't really like stopping life so that I can film [but] on the other way around, to incorporate to life and take from [it] the things that you cannot imagine […] Everything is about experimentation."

— Elisa Miller, in En Filme.com:Elisa Miller, YouTube

Besides allowing the inclusion of spontaneous events, Miller also seeks to highlight the personal qualities of the actors. More than filming performers guided by a script, she intends to create characters with the personalities of the actors so that their performance can seem natural as if filming regular people. Additionally, her works do not focus on showing attractive characters that follow conventional Hollywood standards of beauty but individuals that accurately reflect the reality of the modern society.

== Personal life ==
While Ver Llover represented the beginning of Miller's cinematic career both nationally and internationally, it also became one of the most complicated moments in her life outside of film. For Miller, winning the Golden Palm at the Cannes Film Festival turned out to be a moment of significant emotional pressure:

“What happened is that it gave a boost to my career. It was a kick […] On the other hand, it generated an expectation in a personal level and in others, either producers [and] the press […] Suddenly, I was facing an expectation that I was not even able to handle myself.”

— Elisa Miller, in Elisa Miller, YouTube (Translated from Spanish)

In response to these social pressures in Mexico, Miller gathered with the actress Sofia Espinosa, a long life friend and contributor, and the cinematographer María Secco to collaborate in the production of her first full-length feature Vete mas lejos, Alicia. This film was deeply related to her emotional state of mind:

“ [Vete Más Lejos, Alicia] is a response to all those people that were asking, what are you going to do now? […] I felt the same pressure that Alicia was feeling. She is a 19 years old character that graduates from high school and whose parents were constantly asking or saying, what will you study? What are you going to do? What do you want to do? Make decisions! Make decisions! And that is what we portrayed on screen. That moment of, I don't know! I want to leave far away! I don't want to say anything! I don't know, let me go to the end of the world by myself!”

— Elisa Miller, in En Filme.com:Elisa Miller, YouTube (Translated from Spanish)

Unfortunately, film pressures have not been the only obstacles in both her personal and professional life. Similar to many women in the Mexican workforce, Elisa Miller has expressed to also experience the struggles of machismo and gender discrimination. During the filming process of her latest film El Placer es Mío, Miller confronted multiple crew members who unrecognized her work as a film director. Many of them went even further into calling her “the little girl” as she intended to defend her role as the directions:

“I [personally] never confronted machismo in cinema; however, in [El Placer es Mío] I had a hard time demonstrating my abilities to men in my crew. I found myself constantly [explaining] that not only because I was a woman I didn't know what I was doing.

— Elisa Miller, in Mujeres de película con Valérie Massadian y Elisa Miller, YouTube (Translated from Spanish)

Even though the production continued and the crew members began to respect her as they began to see her artistic work, the response was not immediate. Furthermore, in addition to her role as a director, Miller was required to embrace an intimidating attitude, or “acting” so that the production would take her leadership seriously.

== Filmography ==
Film
Year	Title	Director	Screenwriter	Producer	Actress	Notes
2006	Ver Llover (short)	Yes	Yes			
2008	Roma (short)	Yes	Yes			
2010	Vete más lejos Alicia	Yes		Yes		
2014	About Sarah (Documentary)	Yes	Yes	Yes		
2015	El Regreso del Muerto (Documentary)			Yes		
2016	El Placer es Mío	Yes	Yes			
2023	Hurricane Season	Yes	Yes			

== Awards ==
Year	Award	Category	Title	Result
2006	Morelia International Film Festival	Short Film Competition Award	Ver Llover	Won
2007	Cannes Film Festival	Best Short Film	Ver Llover	Won
2007	Cannes Film Festival	Norman McLaren Award	Ver Llover	Won
2007	Havana Film Festival	The Coral	Ver Llover	Won
2008	Ariel Award	Silver Ariel	Ver Llover	Won
2008	Morelia International Film Festival	Garcia Bross Prize	Roma	Won
2009	Expresión en Corto International Film Festival	Special Jury Award	Roma	Won
2009	Imago	Best Film	Roma	Won
2009	Ariel Award	Silver Ariel	Roma	Nominated
2010	Pune International Film Festival	Best Director in the Student Category	Vete más lejos Alicia	Won
2011	Rotterdam International Film Festival	Tiger Award	Vete más lejos Alicia	Nominated
2015	Morelia International Film Festival	Best First/Second Mexican Feature	Vete más lejos Alicia	Won
2023	Morelia International Film Festival	Best Mexican Feature Film	Hurricane Season	Nominated
2023	Morelia International Film Festival	Best Screenplay (shared with Daniela Gómez)	Hurricane Season	Won
