= Sarah Adler =

French-Israeli actress (born 1978)

Sarah Adler שרה אדלר
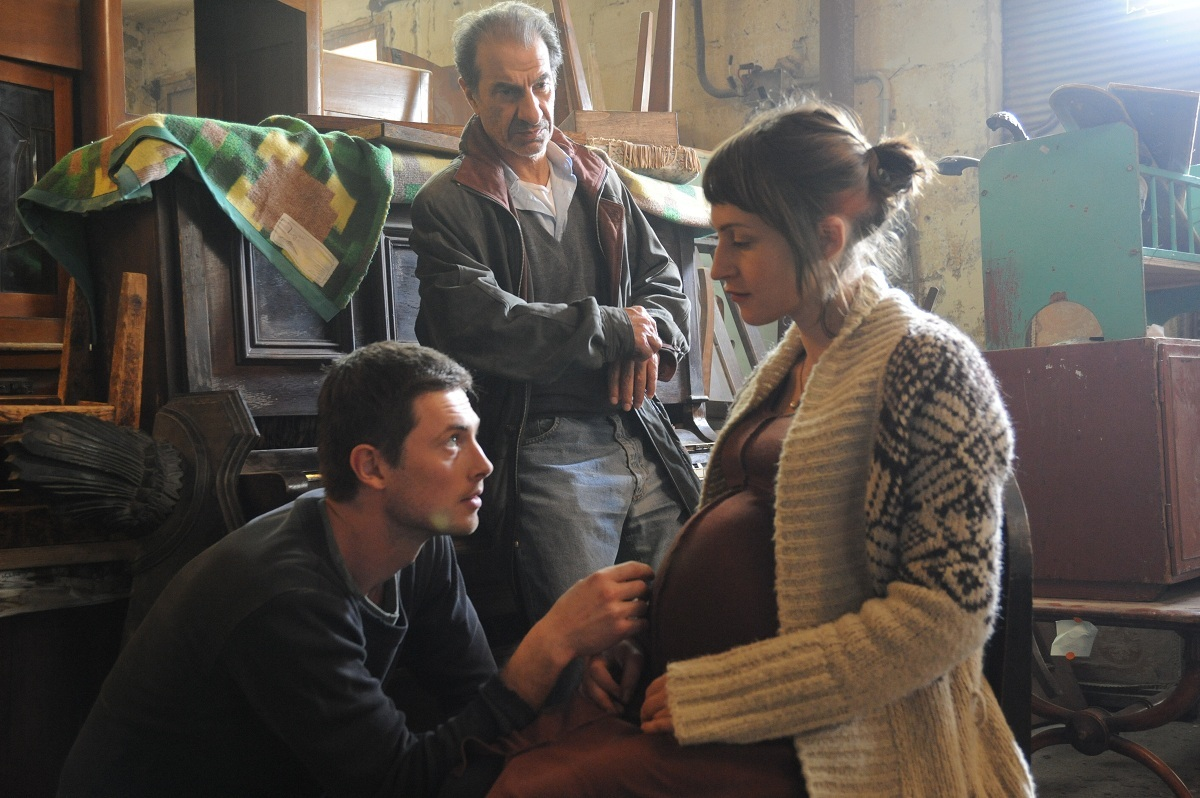
- Sarah Adler (right) in Restoration
- Born: 1978 (age 47–48); Paris, France
- Occupation: Actress
- Years active: 1999–present
- Spouse: Raphael Nadjari

Sarah Adler (Hebrew: שרה אדלר; born 1978) is a French and Israeli actress with dual citizenship.

== Career ==
Adler is now best known for her performances in the 2017 Israeli films Foxtrot and The Cakemaker; earlier in her career her notable films included Stones (2004), directed by her husband Raphael Nadjari; Our Music (2004), directed by Jean-Luc Godard; and Marie Antoinette (2006) directed by Sofia Coppola. Adler was nominated for European Film Award for Best Actress for her performance in Our Music, and Ophir Award for Best Actress for her performance in Jellyfish which won the Cannes Film Festivals' Caméra d'or.

In 2018, she won the Ophir Award for Best Actress for her role in The Cakemaker.

== Filmography ==
Title	Year	Role	Notes
Afraid of Everything	1999	Iris	
Dresden	1999	Woman in Coffee Shop	
Upheaval	2001	Unknown	Short film
French Variety	2003	Pascale	Variété française
Stones	2004	Lili	אבנים (Avanim)
Our Music	2004	Judith Lerner	Notre musique Nominated—European Film Award for Best Actress
Year Zero	2004	Anna	שנת אפס (Shnat Effes)
How I Feel	2005	Unknown	Short Film
Nina's House	2005	Marlène	La maison de Nina
Marie Antoinette	2006	Comtesse d'Artois	
The Case of the Week	2006	Anna	TV Series (2006–09) פרשת השבוע (Parashat Ha Shavua)
Jellyfish	2007	Batia	מדוזות (Meduzot); Nominated—Ophir Award for Best Actress
Ultimatum	2009	Tamar	Ultimatum
Andante	2010	Sarah	אנדנטה (Andante)
Bachelor Days Are Over	2011	Léa	Pourquoi tu pleures?
Restoration	2011	Hava	בוקר טוב אדון פידלמן (Boker Tov Adon Fidelman/Good Morning Mr. Fidelman)
Aya	2012	Aya	Short film
Ana Arabia	2013	Miriam	
Self Made	2014	Michal	
Dawn	2014	Ilana	
Tsili	2014	Tsili	
The Cakemaker	2017	Anat	
Foxtrot	2017	Daphna Feldmann	
Un entretien	2019		TV Series
I Wish Someone Were Waiting for Me Somewhere	2019	Nathalie	
The Middleman	2019-2020	Louise Tronier	TV Series
Beating Sun	2022	Alma	
Tel Aviv/Beirut	2022	Myriam	
The Taste of Things	2023	La mère de Pauline	

== Awards and nominations ==
Year	Award	Category	Nominated work	Result
2004	European Film Awards	Best Actress	Our Music	Nominated
2007	Ophir Awards	Best Actress	Jellyfish	Nominated
