= Photoplay (disambiguation) =

A photoplay is another name for a motion picture.

Photoplay may also refer to:

- Photoplay (album), 1977 album by Australian rock band Sherbet
- Photoplay (magazine), one of the first American film fan magazines, 1911–1980
- Photoplay edition, movie tie-in books in which film stills accompany a novel
- Photoplay music, incidental music written to accompany silent films
- Photoplay Productions, a British independent film company with a specialty in silent films
