= Tehilim (film) =

- Film poster
- Directed by: Raphael Nadjari
- Written by: Raphaël Nadjari; Vincent Poymiro
- Produced by: Geoffroy Grison; Fred Bellaiche; Marek Rosenbaum; Itai Tamir; Noah Harlan
- Starring: Michael Moshonov; Limor Goldstein; Yonathan Alster; Shmuel Vilojni; Yohav Hait; Ilan Dar; Reut Lev
- Cinematography: Laurent Brunet
- Edited by: Sean Foley
- Music by: Nathaniel Méchaly
- Distributed by: Haut et Court
- Release dates: 20 May 2007 (Cannes); 30 May 2007 (France)
- Running time: 100 minutes
- Countries: Israel; France
- Language: Hebrew

Tehilim is Raphael Nadjari's fifth feature film. It was shot in Jerusalem in 2006. Tehilim in the Hebrew word for Psalms.

The plot revolves around a religious family in Jerusalem grappling with the mysterious disappearance of the father. The family's two children attempt to cope with the difficult situation by distributing Psalms and giving charity, but to no avail.

Raphael Nadjari was nominated for the Hugo Award at the Chicago International Film Festival, the Wolgin Award at the Jerusalem Film Festival, and the Palme d'Or at the Cannes Film Festival. He won the Grand Prize at the FILMeX Festival in Tokyo.

== Plot ==
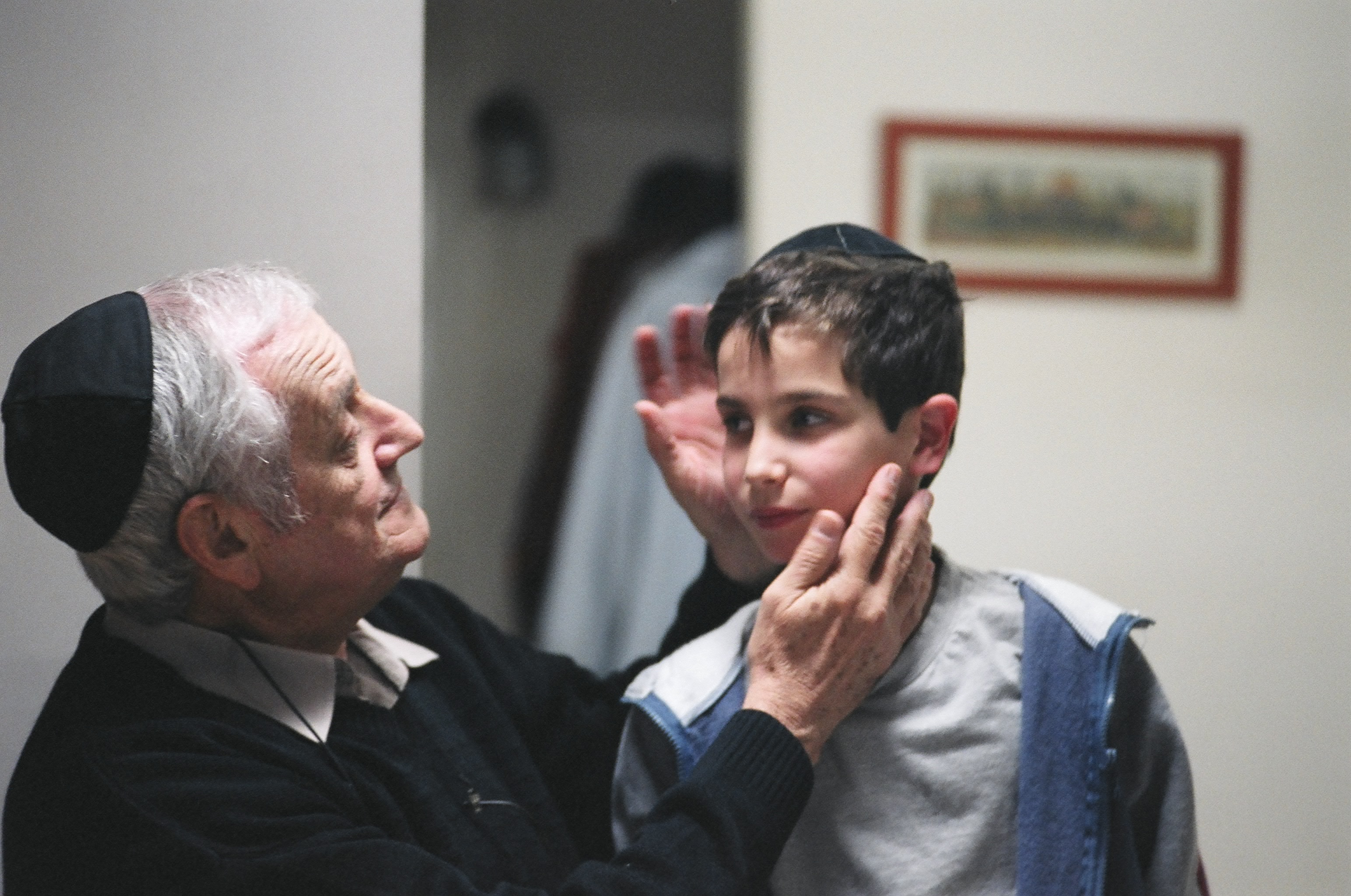
Scene from the movie.

In contemporary Jerusalem, a small Jewish family leads an ordinary life until following a car accident, the father mysteriously disappears. They all deal with his absence and the difficulties of everyday life as best they can. While the adults take refuge in silence or traditions, the two children, Menachem and David, seek their own way to find their father.

== Cast ==
- Michael Moshonov - Menachem
- Yonathan Alster David
- Limor Goldstein - Alma
- Shmuel Vilozni - Eli
- Ilan Dar - Shmuel
- Yoav Hait - Aharon
- Reut Lev - Deborah

== Format and release ==
The film was shot in HD, using prime lenses. The film was released in France by Haut et Court, in Spain, Belgium and Germany and exhibited at the Museum of Modern Art in New York the following year.

Tehilim received top prize in the Tokyo Filmex. The jury conducted by Lee Chang Dong wrote the following statement: "The mysterious loss of the father of an average Israeli family brings to the fore a universal problem of today's world - the lack of orientation. It is left to the individual whether to see this as a human subject matter, an intimate story or a reflection of Israeli society today. It is told in a personal style, which - as world cinema- transgresses borders and religions".

== Awards and nominations ==
- Cannes Film Festival (2007) - In Competition
- Tokyo Filmex (2007) - Grand Prize
