= A Strange Course of Events =

2013 film

- Film poster
- Directed by: Raphaël Nadjari
- Written by: Geoffroy Grison; Raphaël Nadjari
- Produced by: Caroline Bonmarchand; Marek Rozenbaum; Itai Tamir
- Starring: Ori Pfeffer; Moni Moshonov; Michaela Eshet
- Cinematography: Laurent Brunet
- Edited by: Simon Birman
- Music by: Jean-Pierre Sluys; Jocelyn Soubiran
- Distributed by: Shellac Distribution (France)
- Release dates: 21 May 2013 (Cannes); 4 December 2013 (France)
- Running time: 98 minutes
- Countries: France; Israel
- Language: Hebrew

A Strange Course of Events is a 2013 French-Israeli drama film directed by Raphaël Nadjari. It was screened in the Directors' Fortnight section at the 2013 Cannes Film Festival. as well as Bangkok Film Festival and Haifa Film Festival.

== Plot ==
Saul is a divorced man who is prone to avoid confrontations. He lives alone in Tel Aviv trying hard to get out of his depressed mental state. He has one daughter, Michal, (Bethany Gorenberg), who lives with his ex Ront (Maya Dagan), he works at the reception of a health clinic and when a patient bursts at him, he decides to take a holiday and take the train to visit his widowed father (Moni Moshonov) who seems to suffer with a variety of issues and who usually blames the son for all his misfortune. Their first encounter after five years is rather alienating for Saul who discovers that his father is into yoga.

== Cast ==
- Ori Pfeffer as Saul
- Moni Moshonov as Simon
- Michaela Eshet as Bathy
- Maya Kenig as Orly
- Bethany Gorenberg as Michal
- Maya Dagan as Ronit
