= Julie Paratian =

French film producer

Julie Paratian is a French film producer of both documentary and fiction films. Her production company, Sister Productions (stylised SISTER Productions), has co-produced many films with companies from many other countries.

== Early life and education ==
Julie Paratian graduated from HEC Business School in Paris, France.

== Career ==
After graduation, Paratian moved to the United States, where she became a director for Orange, a multimedia production company in the 1990s. She worked as an international senior executive in Buenos Aires, Argentina, and New York City, US. Returning to France, she started working for World Social Forum, and also worked in India for this NGO.

She became a producer for Avenue B Productions in 2004, in partnership with Caroline Bonmarchand, producing mainly documentary films and also becoming involved in developing fiction films and restructuring the company.

In 2011, Paratian founded Sister Productions, a production company based in the Aquitaine region. She named her production company SISTER Productions as an anagram of "RESIST", to convey its "international, feminist and militant approach".

Paratian co-produced the 2016 Franco-Canadian drama film Night Song (French: Mobile Étoile), directed by Raphaël Nadjari.

Partian co-produced, with Astrig Chandeze-Avakian, the documentary feature Demons in Paradise, about the Sri Lankan Civil War. The film, co-written and directed by Jude Ratnam, premiered at Cannes Film Festival as a Special Screening in June 2017.

Through her company Sister Productions, she co-produced the 2020 Armenian-Belgian-French drama film Should the Wind Drop (French: Si le vent tombe), through Sister Productions. The film was selected for the 73rd edition of the Cannes Festival.

She co-produced the US-French-Irish-Jordanian feature documentary film My Sweet Land (2024), with director Sareen Hairabedian in his debut feature, along with Azza Hourani and David Rane.

Paratien co-produced, with Quebecois company La Cinquième Maison, the 2023 Canadian-French documentary film Caiti Blues, directed by Justine Harbonnier, which premiered in the Burning Lights Competition at the Visions du Réel film festival in Switzerland in 2023. and was screened at many other festivals.

Sister Productions was associate producer on Little Trouble Girls a 2025 drama film co-written and directed by Slovenian filmmaker Urška Djukić in her directorial debut.

Paratien is based in Bordeaux, France. She is the sole producer at the company, which is headquartered in Berson, France. The company produces documentaries and fiction films, as well as audiovisual media, often working with international subjects and directors.

== Other activities ==
As of 2025 Paratian is a member of the Eurodoc and ACE networks, and is a former president of Les Amis du Cinéma du Réel (Friends of Documentary Cinema).
