= Micol Ostow =

American writer

- Born: April 29, 1976 (age 50); New York City, U.S.
- Occupations: Author; editor; educator
- Spouse: Noah Harlan
- Writing career
- Genre: Novels
- Notable work: Emily Goldberg Learns to Salsa

Micol Ostow (born April 29, 1976) is an American author, editor and educator who has written more than 40 published works. Her first original hardcover novel, Emily Goldberg Learns to Salsa, was named a "New York Public Library Book for the Teen Age". She has also been the ghostwriter for novelizations of television series such as Buffy the Vampire Slayer, Charmed and Fearless.

== Early years ==
Ostow was born in New York City to a Jewish-American father and a Puerto Rican mother. Her brother is the cartoonist, David Ostow. Even though she was raised in the Jewish faith (her mother, who was a Catholic, converted before she married her father), she always maintained a good relationship and remained close to her Puerto Rican Catholic family. In 1990, when her grandmother was dying in Puerto Rico, she joined her immediate family and other members of the family who traveled from Florida, New York, and other places to the island to be with her. The experience of seeing how easily the family banded together, despite the fact that some of them had never even met before, served as an inspirational factor when she wrote her first novel Emily Goldberg Learns to Salsa.

Raised in South Orange, New Jersey, Ostow graduated from Solomon Schechter Day School of Essex and Union (now Golda Och Academy), a Jewish day school in West Orange.

After Ostow graduated from college, she was hired by the New York City publisher Simon & Schuster, as an editor and began to author young-adult novels.

== Emily Goldberg Learns to Salsa ==
Ostow took a Media Bistro's YA (Young Adult) Writing Course. During the course she wrote the Emily Goldberg Learns to Salsa pitch and the first ten pages of the manuscript in her class. She sold it before the semester ended.

The book is about a Jewish girl from the suburbs of New York. Her mother has family in Puerto Rico, but Emily has never had any contact with them – not until she is forced to go to the Caribbean for her grandmother's funeral. Even though Emily wants nothing to do with her Puerto Rican heritage a very special person shows her that uncovering her roots is like discovering a secret part of her own heart.

== Written works ==
Among the books which Ostow has authored or co-authored are the following:

- The Executive Desk Gong (Running Press Mini Kits) (September 17, 2003)
- Westminster Abby (S.A.S.S.) by Micol Ostow (May 5, 2005), part of the Students Across the Seven Seas series
- The Warren Witches (Charmed) by Laura J. Burns, Micol Ostow, Greg Elliot, and Paul Ruditis
- The Quotable Slayer (Buffy the Vampire Slayer) by Steven Brezenoff and Micol Ostow (December 2, 2003)
- House of Shards (Charmed) by Micol Ostow (Oct 24, 2006)
- Crush du Jour (Romantic Comedies) by Micol Ostow
- Popular Vote by Micol Ostow
- Changeling Places (Charmed) by Micol Ostow (March 22, 2005)
- 30 Guys in 30 Days (Simon Romantic Comedies) by Micol Ostow (May 31, 2005)
- Ultimate Travel Games (Crazy Games) (May 4, 2006)
- Emily Goldberg Learns to Salsa by Micol Ostow (November 2, 2006)
- Mind Your Manners, Dick and Jane by Micol Ostow and Noah Harlan (November 2, 2006)
- Mumble's Journey: The Junior Novelization of Happy Feet by Micol Ostow
- GoldenGirl (Bradford Novel) by Micol Ostow (Jan. 27, 2009)
- What Would My Cell Phone Do? by Micol Ostow (Jun 9, 2011)
- Louise Trapeze Is Totally 100% Fearless by Micol Ostow. Illustrated by Brigette Barrager (Random, 2015).
- The Day Before (Riverdale) by Micol Ostow (December 26, 2018)
- Get Out of Town (Riverdale) by Micol Ostow (May 28, 2019)
- The Maple Murders (Riverdale) by Micol Ostow (October 15, 2019)
- The Curse (Nancy Drew) by Micol Ostow (March 31, 2020)
- Death of a Cheerleader (Riverdale) by Micol Ostow (May 5, 2020)

Ostow is also the author (uncredited) of young-adult novels based on television series, including American Dreams, and for novel series, including Fearless and Camp Confidential.

== Later years ==
After spending the first eight years of her career as an editor, Ostow decided to become a freelance writer. She is pursuing a Master of Fine Arts (MFA) degree in writing for children and young adults through Vermont College of Fine Arts. The Media Bistro's YA (Young Adult) Writing Course instructor, Kristen Kemp was looking for someone to continue her work as an instructor and Ostow, who is a full-time freelance accepted the job. She lives and works in NYC with her Emmy Award-winning filmmaker husband, Noah Harlan.
