= Grosset & Dunlap =

American publishing house

- Parent company: Penguin Young Readers Group (Penguin Group)
- Founded: 1898; 128 years ago
- Founders: Alexander Grosset and George T. Dunlap
- Country of origin: United States
- Headquarters location: 345 Hudson Street, 14th floor, New York City
- Publication types: Books
- Fiction genres: Photoplay editions; children's literature; mystery fiction
- Imprints: Platt & Munk; Charter Books (Ace Charter); Bedtime Stories; Junior Library
- Official website: penguinrandomhouse.com/authors/2034385/grosset-and-dunlap

Grosset & Dunlap is a New York City-based publishing house founded in 1898. The company was purchased by G. P. Putnam's Sons in 1982 and is part of Penguin Random House through its subsidiary, Penguin Group.

In recent years, through the Penguin Group, they have published approximately 170 titles a year including licensed children's books for these properties: Miss Spider, Strawberry Shortcake, Super Why!, Charlie and Lola, Nova the Robot, Weebles, Bratz, The Wiggles, Sonic X, and Atomic Betty. Grosset & Dunlap also publishes Dick and Jane children's books and through Platt & Munk, The Little Engine That Could.

== History ==
The company was founded in 1898 by Alexander Grosset and George T. Dunlap. It was originally primarily a hardcover reprint house. In 1907, Grosset & Dunlap acquired Chatterton & Peck, who had a large children's list including the Stratemeyer Syndicate.

Grosset & Dunlap is historically known for its photoplay editions and juvenile series books like The Hardy Boys, Nancy Drew, the Bobbsey Twins, Tom Swift, Cherry Ames and other books from their long partnership with the Stratemeyer Syndicate (owned by Simon & Schuster).

After George T. Dunlap retired in 1944, Grosset & Dunlap was sold to a consortium of Random House; Little, Brown; Harper and Brothers; Scribners; and the Book of the Month Club. Grosset & Dunlap launched the paperback reprint house Bantam Books in 1945 in cooperation with Curtis Publishing Company. In 1954, Grosset & Dunlap acquired McLoughlin Brothers. Grosset & Dunlap had an initial public offering in 1961, by which time the majority of the books published were children's books. In 1964, Grosset & Dunlap acquired full ownership of Bantam from Curtis.

Grosset & Dunlap obtained permission from Little, Brown, to reprint Thornton W. Burgess's many children's books, and began issuing the Bedtime Stories series (20 books originally published 1913–1919, including such titles as The Adventures of Reddy Fox and The Adventures of Chatterer the Red Squirrel) in 1949. The original Little, Brown editions had plates of high quality paper for the illustrations, but the Grosset & Dunlap editions were to print the illustrations on the same stock as the text. They commissioned the original artist, Harrison Cady, to recreate the illustrations as line drawings appropriate for that type of paper, and to create many additional illustrations. Where the original Little, Brown editions had six full-page illustrations, the Grosset & Dunlap had 14 (fourteen) full-page drawings, plus many smaller drawings placed throughout the text. Cady had matured as an artist in the decades since the original Little, Brown illustrations. The line drawings he did for Grosset & Dunlap are simpler than the illustrations he had made for Little, Brown, and are generally more charming. The original Little, Brown illustrations better convey Cady's remarkable vision for Burgess' creatures.

Grosset & Dunlap published the Burgess books as hardcovers with dust jackets from 1949 to 1957, then as pink hardcovers without dust jackets from about 1962 into the 1970s. They issued them with library bindings in 1977. In most cases, the latest date printed anywhere in the book was from the early 1940s, so the Grosset & Dunlap editions are today often mistaken for being older than they are. In the 1980s, Little, Brown, owned by Penguin, canceled their permission for Grosset & Dunlap to publish the Burgess books. For most of the titles, the Harrison Cady illustrations commissioned by Grosset & Dunlap have never been published since then. An exception is the 2000 Dover edition of The Adventures of Paddy the Beaver, which has all of them (the illustrations in most of the Dover editions are not the Grosset & Dunlap commissions).

In 1963 Grosset & Dunlap published Babies, written and illustrated by Gyo Fujikawa, which was one of the earliest children's books to use multiracial characters.

In 1968, Grosset & Dunlap was acquired by conglomerate National General Corporation, run by Gene Klein. National General was acquired by American Financial Group in 1973.

In the 1970s and 1980s, the company's Charter Books (also known as Ace Charter) imprint published mystery fiction, most notably the Leslie Charteris series The Saint.

In 1974, film and television company Filmways bought the company from American Financial Group (Bantam was sold separately). During this time, Grosset & Dunlap acquired a new paperback publisher, Ace Books. Filmways sold Grosset & Dunlap to G. P. Putnam's Sons when Orion Pictures acquired Filmways in 1982.

In 1978, the company drew a great deal of attention with its publication of RN: The Memoirs of Richard Nixon. The preparation of the book was alluded to briefly in the 2008 Oscar-nominated film Frost/Nixon, which chronicled and dramatized a series of interviews with the ex-president conducted by British television personality David Frost. Shortly after the aforementioned interviews aired to great publicity, the copy editor whom Grosset & Dunlap sent to San Clemente to work on the book with Nixon's staff was named as David Frost.

Grosset & Dunlap also published a series of literary classics which they called the Illustrated Junior Library. This series, published with colorful illustrations, included such titles as Heidi, an expurgated edition of Gulliver's Travels, Swiss Family Robinson, The Boy's King Arthur (published under the title King Arthur and his Knights of the Round Table), and The Wonderful Wizard of Oz (a 1956 reprinting of the 1944 edition with new illustrations by Evelyn Copelman, and published under the title The Wizard of Oz).

Putnam merged with Penguin Group in 1996. In 2013, Penguin merged with Bertelsmann's Random House, forming Penguin Random House.

Today, Grosset & Dunlap's new juvenile series include Dish, Camp Confidential, Flirt, Katie Kazoo, Dragon Slayers' Academy, and Henry Winkler and Lin Oliver's Hank Zipzer series.

== Book series ==
- Beverly Gray (1934–1955)
- Bomba, the Jungle Boy (1926–1938)
- Buddy Books for Boys
- The Bobbsey Twins
- Books of Distinction (1926–1937)
- Cameo Classics (1935–1948)
- Camp Confidential
- Cherry Ames (1943–1968)
- Chip Hilton (1948–1966)
- Christopher Cool (1967–1969)
- The Dana Girls (1934–1979)
- Every Boy's Library (1899–1920)
- Ferret Library (1935)
- Hal Keen
- Hank Zipzer
- The Hardy Boys
- Honey Bunch
- Judy Bolton (1932–1967)
- Ken Holt (1949–1963)
- The Listener's Music Library
- The Little Music Library
- The Lone Ranger (1936–1956)
- Macmillan's Standard Library (1912–1915)
- Nancy Drew Mystery Stories
- Novels of Distinction (1928–1942)
- Pee-Wee Harris
- Peggy Lane Theater Stories (1962–1965)
- Rick Brant (1947–1968)
- The Rover Boys
- Roy Blakeley
- Signature Biographies
- Skippy Dare
- Tempo Books
- Tom Corbett, Space Cadet (1952–1956)
- Tom Slade
- Tom Swift (1910–1941)
- Tom Swift Jr. (1954–1971)
- Tom Quest (1947–1955)
- The Universal Library
- Westy Martin
- We Were There (1955–1963)
- Who Was...?

== See also ==
- Wonder Books
