= Nathaniel Méchaly =

French musician and film composer (born 1972)

- Born: 1972 (age 52–53); France
- Genres: Rock, film scores
- Occupation(s): Composer, record producer, musician
- Labels: EuropaCorp; Lakeshore Records; EMI
- Website: nathanielmechaly.fr

Nathaniel Méchaly (born 1972) is a French musician and film composer. His composing credits include Avanim (2004), Revolver (2005), Colombiana (2011), The Grandmaster (2013), and the Taken trilogy (2008–2014).

== Early life ==
Méchaly was born in 1972. He studied music at the Conservatoire National de Région de Musique de Marseille. His older sister, opera singer Gaëlle Méchaly, studied music at the same conservatoire.

== Career ==
Méchaly began his career as a composer for television shows and commercials for French media conglomerates. He served as an assistant to French-Lebanese composer Gabriel Yared.

He wrote his first score for French-Israeli writer and director Raphaël Nadjari's 2004 film Avanim. He went on to score two more Israeli feature films: Ushpizin (2004), and Tehilim (2007) which was also directed by Nadjari. Eventually, the French production company EuropaCorp's music department director became aware of Méchaly's earlier works and commissioned him to compose French actor Richard Berry's 2005 directorial feature film The Black Box. French screenwriter and director Luc Besson, co-founder of EuropaCorp was pleased with Méchaly's work in The Black Box and decided to hire him for future projects.

Méchaly won Best Original Film Score at the 33rd Hong Kong Film Awards and Best Composer at the 8th Asian Film Awards for The Grandmaster (2013) with Japanese composer Shigeru Umebayashi.

== Selected filmography ==
Year	Title	Director	Studio	Notes
2004	Avanim	Raphaël Nadjari	BVNG Productions; Transfax Film Productions; 2.1 Films; Compagnie des Phares et Balises	
2004	Ushpizin	Gidi Dar	Eddie King Films	
2005	Revolver	Guy Ritchie	Samuel Goldwyn Films	
2005	The Black Box	Richard Berry	EuropaCorp	
2007	Tehilim	Raphaël Nadjari	BVNG Productions; Transfax Film Productions	
2007	The Secret	Vincent Perez	EuropaCorp	
2007	The Last Gang	Ariel Zeitoun	EuropaCorp	
2007	Room of Death	Alfred Lot	Bac Films	
2008	Taken	Pierre Morel	EuropaCorp (France); 20th Century Fox (US)	
2008	Dorothy Mills	Agnès Merlet	Dutch FilmWorks	
2009	Eyes Wide Open	Haim Tabakman	Peccadillo Pictures	
2009	The Assassin Next Door	Danny Lerner	Bleiberg Entertainment	
2010	Une petite zone de turbulences	Alfred Lot	UGC / TFI Films	
2011	Final Balance	Pierre Lacan	Sombrero Films	
2011	Colombiana	Olivier Megaton	EuropaCorp	
2012	Taken 2	Olivier Megaton	EuropaCorp (France); 20th Century Fox (US)	
2012	Black Really Suits You	Jacques Bral	Thunder Films International	
2013	The Grandmaster	Wong Kar-wai	Block 2 Pictures; Jet Tone Films; Sil-Metropole Organisation; Bona International Film Group	Composed with Shigeru Umebayashi and Stefano Lentini
2014	Angélique	Ariel Zeitoun	EuropaCorp	
2014	Get Well Soon	Jean Becker	ICE3; K.J.B. Production; SND Films; France 3 Cinéma; Rhône-Alpes Cinéma	
2014	Pure Life	Jeremy Banster	Cantina Studio	
2014	Taken 3	Olivier Megaton	EuropaCorp (France); 20th Century Fox (US)	
2016	Shut In	Farren Blackburn	Transfilm International; Lava Bear Films; Canal+ Ocs; Cine+	
2016	See You Tomorrow	Zhang Jiajia	Alibaba Pictures	
2017	Stratton	Simon West	GFM Films	
2024	Mads	David Moreau	Les Enfants Terribles	
