= A Gentle Creature =

1876 short story by Fyodor Dostoyevsky

- Short story by Fyodor Dostoyevsky
- Original title: Кроткая (Krotkaya)
- Language: Russian
- Genre: Short story

Publication
- Publication date: 1876
- Publication place: Russian Empire
- Media type: Print

"A Gentle Creature" (Russian: Кроткая, romanized: Krotkaya), sometimes also translated as "The Meek One", is a short story by Fyodor Dostoyevsky written in November 1876. A first-person stream of consciousness narrative, the piece comes with the subtitle of "A Fantastic Story", and it chronicles the relationship between a pawnbroker and a girl that frequents his shop. The story was inspired by a news report that Dostoyevsky read in April 1876 about the suicide of a seamstress. Dostoyevsky referred to it as a "meek suicide" that "keeps haunting you for a long time."

== Plot summary ==
The story opens with the narrator in a frenzy about an apparent tragedy that has just befallen his household. His wife has apparently died, as he makes repeated references to her being laid out on a table, presumably lifeless. The narrator proceeds to make an attempt to relate the story to the reader in an effort to make sense of the situation.

The narrator is the owner of a pawnshop, and one of his repeated customers was a young girl of sixteen who always pawns items to earn money to advertise as a governess in the newspaper. The narrator could see that she was in a dire financial situation, and he often gave her much more for her pawned items than they were reasonably worth. The narrator slowly develops an interest in the girl.

The narrator investigates the girl's background, and finds that she is at the mercy of two greedy aunts. The aunts were arranging her marriage to a fat shopkeeper who previously beat both of his ex-wives to death. Once the shopkeeper proposed marriage to the girl, the narrator countered with his own proposal. The girl decides, after some deliberation, to marry the narrator.

The narrator's marriage started out nicely, but his miserly and reserved ways are taxing to his young wife. A dearth of communication and disagreements about how the pawnshop should be run eventually result in arguments, though the narrator insists that they never quarreled.

The narrator's wife begins to make a habit of leaving during the day, and eventually it is discovered that she is visiting Efimovich, a member of the narrator's former regiment. The narrator's wife eventually confronts the narrator with the details that she learned from Efimovich: details about the narrator's shameful departure from his regiment. The narrator is unperturbed, at least externally, and his wife continues her visits to Efimovich. One time, the narrator follows his wife to Efimovich, bringing a revolver. He listens in delight to a verbal duel between his wife and Efimovich, at whom she laughs; and eventually he bursts in and reclaims his wife.

The narrator and his wife return home. They retire for the night separately. In the morning, the narrator opens his eyes to see that his wife is standing over him with the revolver pointed at his temple. He simply closes his eyes again, and is convinced that he has conquered her with his readiness to accept death. She does not shoot, and the narrator buys her a separate bed that day. That same day, she becomes ill.

The narrator spares no expense for his wife's medical care, and she slowly recovers. Throughout the entire winter the narrator watches his wife furtively, and a watershed moment happens when she begins to sing in his presence. The narrator kisses his wife's feet and promises to be a changed man. He recounts the story of his shame in the regiment, and he promises to take her to Boulogne-sur-Mer. Several days later, the narrator leaves the house to make arrangements for passports.

When the narrator returns home, he is met with a crowd of people outside his house. His wife has committed suicide: she has jumped out of the window while holding an icon. The narrator is convinced that he was only five minutes too late, even though it was ultimately his narcissistic love that drove his gentle wife to suicide.

== Analysis ==
The characterization of the narrator has been compared to the underground man of Notes from Underground, and of the pawnbrokers in Crime and Punishment and The Idiot that seek to empower themselves through the accumulation of wealth. The characterization of the narrator and his wife's suicide are meant as a criticism of what Dostoyevsky refers to as kosnost or spiritual stagnation that results from material pursuits.

== Film adaptations ==
In 1960, а film adaptation was made by Aleksandr Borisov; in 1969, another adaptation, Une Femme douce (A Gentle Woman), was made by Robert Bresson; in 1995, by Mariusz Treliński as Łagodna; In 1991, Mani Kaul made Nazar, based on A Gentle Creature. The film was produced by the National Film Development Corporation of India (NFDC) and finally, in 1998, Raphael Nadjari did a modern adaptation set in present-day New York, The Shade. In 2014, Sri Lankan filmmaker Prasanna Vithanage based his film, With you, without you. on this story. In 2015, a Vietnamese director Lê Văn Kiệt adapted this story in his film: Dịu Dàng - Gentle. Another 2015 adaption was the Russian film Клетка (The Cage). In 2017, Sergei Loznitsa adapted the story into the feature film A Gentle Creature, which was selected and had its world premiere in the Official Competition at the 2017 Festival de Cannes.
