= My Sweet Land =

2024 documentary film

- Promotional release poster
- Directed by: Sareen Hairabedian
- Written by: Sareen Hairabedian
- Produced by: Sareen Hairabedian; Azza Hourani
- Cinematography: Sareen Hairabedian
- Edited by: Sareen Hairabedian; Raphaëlle Martin-Holger
- Music by: Tigran Hamasyan
- Production companies: HAI Creative; Sister Productions; Soilsiú Films; ITVS; Corporation for Public Broadcasting; Arte; World of HA Productions
- Release date: June 13, 2024 (Sheffield)
- Running time: 86 minutes
- Countries: United States; France; Ireland; Jordan
- Language: Armenian

My Sweet Land is a 2024 documentary film written, co-produced, edited and directed by Sareen Hairabedian. It follows 11-year-old Vrej, a boy living in Nagorno-Karabakh whose life takes a sudden turn when war erupts and he is forced to flee.

It had its world premiere at Sheffield DocFest on June 13, 2024.

== Premise ==
Eleven-year-old Vrej lives in Nagorno-Karabakh, and his life takes a sudden turn when the war erupts and he is forced to flee. He later returns, and he must learn the ways of war to defend his homeland.

== Production ==
In 2018, Sareen Hairabedian met Vrej in Nagorno-Karabakh, during a research trip, to meet children of couples who mass married in 2008, in order to populate the region. Hairabedian wanted to tell the story through the eyes of a child in order to focus on humanitarian and humane aspects.

== Release ==
The film had its world premiere at the Sheffield DocFest on June 13, 2024. It also screened at DOC NYC on November 16, 2024 and at CPH:DOX in March 2025.

== Reception ==
=== Oscar submission ===
In September 2024, Jordan selected the film as the country's submission for the Academy Award for Best International Feature Film. In November 2024, Jordan withdrew the film for consideration following diplomatic pressure from Azerbaijan. Additionally the film was banned in Jordan.

Hairabedian responded by stating: "It’s a film that has documented a place and a life that no longer exists now. Film and documentary art is one of the most important and effective tools to continue telling the truth that has been cleansed, silenced".

=== Censorship ===
In April 2025, the University of California, Berkeley, sparked a free-speech controversy after canceling a scheduled screening of the documentary My Sweet Land, which depicts the life of a child in Nagorno-Karabakh. Scheduled for April 24 (Armenian Genocide Remembrance Day), the event was canceled just 24 hours prior by the UC Berkeley Human Rights Center. The university reportedly received demands from the Consulate General of Azerbaijan and government-funded scholarship students to halt the screening, labeling the film "political propaganda." UC Berkeley attributed the cancellation to security concerns and a lack of adequate staffing to manage potential protests, denying that political pressure influenced the decision. The move was condemned by the California Armenian Legislative Caucus and civil liberties groups as a violation of academic freedom and an instance of foreign interference on campus. Following months of sustained advocacy, the screening was eventually held at Berkeley Law on September 18, 2025, accompanied by a panel discussion on human rights.
