= Night Song (2016 film) =

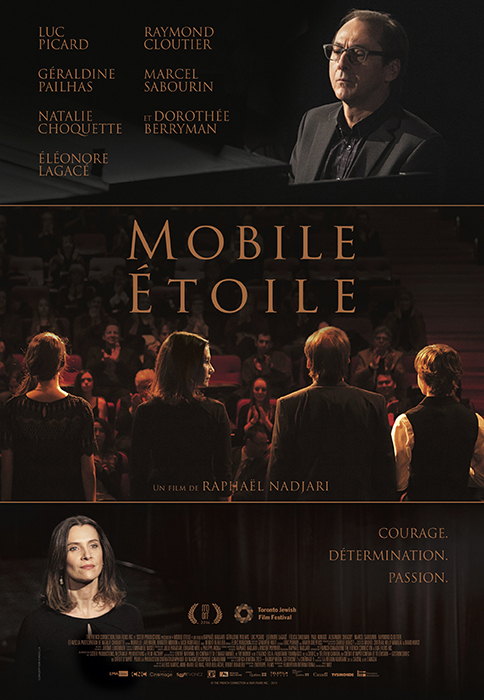
- French: Mobile Étoile
- Directed by: Raphaël Nadjari
- Written by: Raphaël Nadjari
- Produced by: Vincent Poymiro; Alexis Dantec; Fren Bellaïche; Anne-Marie Gélinas; Benoît Beaulieu; Julie Paratian
- Starring: Géraldine Pailhas; Luc Picard; Felicia Shulman; Eléonore Lagacé
- Cinematography: Benoît Beaulieu
- Edited by: Elric Robichon
- Music by: Jérôme Lemonier
- Production companies: The French Connection; EMA Films; Sister Productions
- Distributed by: Zootrope Films (France)
- Release dates: 25 March 2016 (Québec); 27 April 2016 (France)
- Running time: 119 minutes
- Countries: France; Canada
- Language: French
- Budget: €1.6 million

Movie poster

Night Song (French: Mobile Étoile) is a 2016 Franco-Canadian drama film written and directed by Raphaël Nadjari. It stars Géraldine Pailhas, Luc Picard, Felicia Shulman and Eléonore Lagacé. It won the Tobias Spencer Award at the Haifa International Film Festival.

== Cast ==
- Géraldine Pailhas as Hannah Hermann
- Luc Picard as Daniel Dussault
- Felicia Shulman as Etha Salomons
- Éléonore Lagacé as Abigail Colin
- Paul Kunigis as Samuel Badaszcs
- Alexandre Sheasby as David Hermann-Dussault
- Marcel Sabourin as Jean-Paul Dussault
- Raymond Cloutier as Marlus
- Michèle Dascain as Madame Kessel
- Jean Cordier as Monsieur Ruben
- Dorothée Berryman as Liliane Levy
- Natalie Choquette as Natalie Colin / Hannah's voice
