= Demons in Paradise =

2017 film

- Directed by: Jude Ratnam
- Written by: Isabelle Marina
- Screenplay by: Jude Ratnam; Isabelle Marina
- Produced by: Julie Paratian
- Cinematography: Chinthaka Somakeerthi / Mahinda Abeysinghe
- Edited by: Jeanne Oberson
- Music by: Rajkumar Darshan
- Distributed by: Upside
- Release dates: 24 May 2017 (Cannes Film Festival); 21 March 2018 (Sri Lanka)
- Running time: 94 minutes
- Country: France/Sri Lanka
- Language: English/Tamil/Sinhala

Demons in Paradise is a 2017 trilingual Sri Lankan based documentary feature film written by Isabelle Marina and directed by Jude Ratnam in his directorial debut depicting the worst consequences for both Sinhalese and Sri Lankan Tamils due to the 30 year long endured Sri Lankan Civil War. The portions of the film were mostly shot in Sri Lanka and was set in France. The film had its world premiere (special screening) during the 2017 Cannes Film Festival in May 2017 and was opened to highly positive reviews making it as an internationally acclaimed and recognised film. Jude Ratnam became the first Tamil filmmaker to openly criticise the Tamil Tigers through the plot of the documentary film and the film received criticism among Sri Lankan Jaffna Tamils for the storyline.

== Production ==
It was revealed that it nearly took a decade to make and finish the process of this film and was speculated that this was the first recognised film of this genre to be made by a Sri Lankan local Tamil filmmaker. In the documentary film, the director himself blames the Tamil Tigers (LTTE) for many of the atrocities carried out in the Civil War. The director also revealed that this film was made in order to specify that when the war was coming to the end, he wanted his side (Tigers) to lose as the Civil War shown no mercy to whole Sri Lankans.

== Reception ==
After its successful release at the Cannes International Film Festival, several newspapers and news sources in Sri Lanka praised and appreciated the work of Jude Ratnam. The Daily Mirror newspaper praised the film and the director by mentioning it as the most honest, courageous and important piece of art on Sri Lanka done by a patriotic Sri Lankan.

Demons in Paradise was adjudged the best documentary at the 2018 Asia-Pacific Film Festival.

== Controversy ==
The internationally recognised documentary film was removed from being screened at the 2018 Jaffna International Cinema Festival due to its theme which was set against the tone of Sri Lankan Tamils. The film was supposed to be screened during the event which was held on 5 October 2018.

== See also ==
- 2018 Sri Lankan constitutional crisis
