= Mads (film) =

2024 film by David Moreau

- Release poster
- Directed by: David Moreau
- Written by: David Moreau
- Produced by: Marlene Wale; Yohan Baiada
- Starring: Lucille Guillaume; Laurie Pavy; Milton Riche; Yovel Lewkowski; Sasha Rudakova; Vincent Pasdermadjian
- Cinematography: Philip Lozano
- Music by: Nathaniel Méchaly
- Production company: Les Enfants Terribles
- Distributed by: Shudder
- Release dates: 21 September 2024 (Fantastic Fest); 18 October 2024 (Shudder)
- Running time: 89 minutes
- Country: France
- Language: French
- Box office: $49,816

Mads (stylized as MadS) is a 2024 French horror film written and directed by David Moreau. The story follows Julia (portrayed by Lucille Guillaume), Anaïs (Laurie Pavy), and Romain (Milton Riche), who all snort an unknown powdered substance that causes them to grow increasingly erratic. Yovel Lewkowski, Sasha Rudakowa, and Vincent Pasdermadjian appear in supporting roles.

Taking inspiration from the 2015 film Victoria, Mads is presented in real time and was filmed in one continuous shot. Production took place in and around Mulhouse over ten days, with cinematographer Philip Lozano also serving as the lone camera operator. The cast and crew filmed five takes, with the final take being used for the film.

Mads premiered at Fantastic Fest on 21 September 2024, and was digitally released on Shudder on 18 October 2024. It received generally positive reviews from critics and grossed $49,816, with many critics praising the film's one-shot presentation and Pavy's performance.

== Plot ==
On his birthday, Romain snorts an unknown red powdered substance with his drug dealer. As he drives home, he drops a lit cigarette in his father's car and pulls over. A heavily bandaged woman suddenly appears and tries to steal the car, but Romain calms her and offers to take her to the hospital, forgoing the police due to his intoxication. She plays an audio recording in which a doctor explains that she carries an infectious disease and has had her teeth and tongue surgically removed, then repeatedly stabs herself in the neck. Her blood gets on him, even some in his mouth. Believing he is having a bad trip, Romain returns home with her body in the passenger seat. After showering, he begins uncontrollably twitching and finds that the woman is missing when he returns to the garage.

Anaïs, one of Romain's sexual partners, arrives and convinces him to join her at a nearby house party. Romain is increasingly overstimulated by the lights and loud music, retreating to the upstairs restroom as his twitches grow more frequent. Anaïs and her friend Julia arrive upstairs and snort the same red powder. After Anaïs leaves, Romain emerges and tries to have sex with Julia, who is pregnant, but she rebuffs him and returns to the party. Romain's eyes begin reflecting light in the darkness.

Returning downstairs, Romain briefly dances with and kisses Anaïs. But he bites her hard enough to draw blood and she pushes him away. Romain then goes outside and brutally attacks a partygoer before fleeing on his bicycle. His home's alarm system is triggered, and his father calls saying that someone is in their house, but Romain dismisses his concerns. When he arrives, he finds the mute woman removing a tracking device from her chest before pursuing him. He runs upstairs as an armed paramilitary force wearing gas masks invades the home, who ultimately subdue and shoot the woman as Romain escapes. He runs into the forest, laughing uncontrollably and experiencing increasingly severe physical tics. The paramilitary group find and detain him in a van, shooting him repeatedly.

As Romain is driven away, the van nearly hits Anaïs, who is en route to a ridesharing vehicle. In the car, she begins experiencing tics similar to Romain's. Noticing that they are being trailed, the driver exits the car to confront the followers and is immediately killed by the paramilitary group. Anaïs attempts to drive away, though one of her tires is blown out. After uncontrollably convulsing on the street, she flees on foot and is repeatedly shot, though she is unaffected.

Anaïs hides in the restroom of a nearby bar, with the paramilitary force arriving shortly afterward and slaughtering the other patrons. She escapes out a window and calls Julia, arranging a rendezvous at a nearby bridge. On her way, she begins animalistically screeching as her physical tics grow more intense. Emergency warning sirens are heard while Anaïs attacks a passerby and steals a man's bike. She meets with Julia, who places Anaïs on the back of her motorised scooter, intending to take her to the hospital. During the ride, Anaïs repeatedly grabs and smears blood on Julia, forcing Julia to shove her off of the scooter as a siren blares. She leaves Anaïs behind, promising to get help.

Julia's physically disabled mother calls, saying that she is unable to move and has been abandoned by Julia's sister, Alice. Julia rushes home with Anaïs in pursuit, who both begs for help and threatens to eat her. She makes it to her apartment building, narrowly escaping Anaïs in the elevator. The building's power goes out, trapping her as she hears Anaïs devouring one of her neighbours. Alice approaches the elevator to free Julia, but is executed by the paramilitary.

The power returns and Julia makes her way to her mother's apartment, where she finds Anaïs eating her mother's face. Julia runs upstairs and is stopped by another paramilitary member, Noa, who tells her to be silent before searching for Anaïs. Anaïs suddenly attacks Noa's leg before being overpowered and repeatedly shot in the head. Noa removes her mask and, upon realizing that she was bitten by Anaïs, hands Julia her rifle and kills herself with her sidearm. Julia maniacally laughs and slouches against the window, cradling the rifle as explosions and gunfire ravage the city behind her. She then places the rifle beside her and breaks down screaming and crying as the credits roll.

== Cast ==
- Lucille Guillaume as Julia
- Laurie Pavy as Anaïs
- Milton Riche as Romain
- Yovel Lewkowski as Noa
- Sasha Rudakowa as La femme de la route (lit. 'The woman of the road'), a mute woman with an infectious disease
- Vincent Pasdermadjian as Romain's drug dealer

== Development and production ==
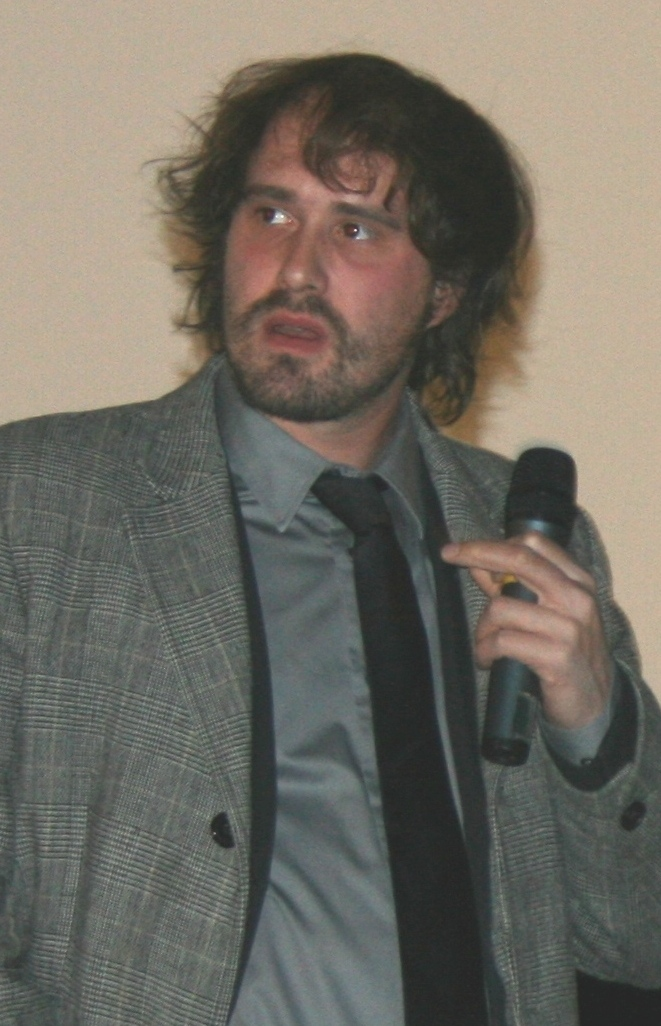
Writer and director David Moreau (pictured in 2008) used his iPhone camera to block and choreograph the film with director of photography Philip Lozano.

Moreau began conceiving Mads after having a nightmare in which he was drugged and experienced a bad trip. Some time later, while jogging in a forest near his Fontainebleau home, he "started to think about this idea and this disease" that could potentially be caused by a drug. He was then startled by an actor in zombie make-up who was filming an episode of The Walking Dead: Daryl Dixon, which he took as "the God of Zombies sending [him] a strange sign" to produce the film. He was inspired to film Mads in one continuous take by the 2015 film Victoria, which was also shot in one take, as he felt that the filmmaking technique added realism that made it seem "almost like a documentary". He wrote basic outlines for the characters, but allowed the actors to develop them further once they were cast. Lead cast members Lucille Guillaume, Laurie Pavy, and Milton Riche were all relatively inexperienced, with Mads serving as Pavy's feature film debut.

Philip Lozano served as the film's director of photography and camera operator. After renting and testing a variety of cameras, he decided to use the Red Raptor VV and worked with Steadicam operator Jan Rubens to build a custom rig that would be light enough for him to manage for the full shoot; the completed rig weighed 12 kilograms (26 lb). The equipment allowed for a small amount of vertical camera movement while restricting horizontal movement, with Moreau describing the camerawork as "not handheld, but not static", as he did not want the film to make viewers "throw up after 25 minutes". Lozano underwent four weeks of cardio and strength training to ensure that he could hold the rig for the full shoot.

Principal photography took place over ten days in the Mulhouse area, which required the production to "basically shut down" the city. The first four days were spent rehearsing, the fifth filming a "technical rehearsal", and the last five days shooting a series of five takes. The story begins in the evening and continues through the night, which required the crew to film only one take per day. Moreau described the first two days of photography as "disaster[s]", as the crew experienced technical issues that prevented them from shooting the entire film. The day after each take, Moreau reviewed the production dailies with the film's crew in a movie theater and collected feedback to improve subsequent takes, citing Pixar's practice of having their production staff "all [take] part in the creative process". The final take was ultimately used for the film. Moreau also had the crew record behind-the-scenes footage of the production using GoPro cameras, which he intends to publicly release "in some form".

Nathaniel Méchaly composed the film's score. The soundtrack album was released in November 2024 via 22D Music.

== Release ==
Shudder purchased the film's distribution rights in North America, the United Kingdom, Ireland, Australia, and New Zealand in February 2024. Mads had its world premiere at Fantastic Fest on 21 September 2024, and screened at the 57th Sitges Film Festival in October. It was digitally released by Shudder on 18 October 2024.

== Reception ==
=== Box office ===
Mads grossed $49,816 worldwide. In Romania, it was theatrically released by Bad Unicorn on 25 October 2024, grossing $36,962 in four weeks. It was also theatrically released in Hungary on 19 December by distributor ADS Service, where it screened for six weeks and grossed $12,854.

=== Critical response ===
On the review aggregator website Rotten Tomatoes, 94% of 51 critics' reviews are positive. The website's consensus reads: "Immersing audiences in pure pandemonium with technical ingenuity and an unblinking point-of-view, MadS is a thrill ride that never lets up." Metacritic, which uses a weighted average, assigned the film a score of 78 out of 100, based on four critics, indicating "generally favorable" reviews. Numerous film critics praised its execution as a one-shot film. (Note: Attributed to multiple references:)

Brian Tallerico of RogerEbert.com described the film as "George A. Romero's Run Lola Run", praising its pacing, originality, "viciously bleak" tone, and "moments of sharp, wicked humor". In her review for The Guardian, Catherine Bray called Mads a "welcome return to form" for David Moreau, complimenting Philip Lozano's camerawork for providing a "sense of momentum" and the film's conclusion for its "euphoric nihilism". Mashable's Kristy Puchko praised Moreau's "achingly natural" dialogue and the performances of Laurie Pavy and Lucille Guillaume, summarizing Mads as a "viciously enthralling thriller".

Derek Smith, writing for Slant Magazine, highlighted the film's "increasingly oppressive atmosphere" and the actor's performances, comparing its intensity to "the most famous scene from Andrzej Zulawski's Possession stretched to feature length. Mary Beth McAndrews of Dread Central echoed that comparison, likening Pavy's (Note: McAndrews' review erroneously credits Lucille Guillaume for portraying Anaïs.) performance during her transformation to Isabelle Adjani's performance in Possession. She called Mads "a hellish fever dream" and complimented its shifting character perspectives for "keep[ing] the narrative feeling fresh".

Reviewing the film for MovieWeb, Mark Keizer complimented the shifting character points-of-view, called Lozano the film's "MVP" for his photography, and praised Nathaniel Méchaly's "propulsive score", though he was critical of the film for being "stubbornly hewed" to genre conventions. In a mixed review for Bloody Disgusting, Meagan Navarro called Pavy's performance as Anaïs the "knockout portion of the story", though she was disappointed that the character was not more focal to the film and found the that "single-take bit [exposed] narrative limitations" by the third act.

== Future ==
Moreau has discussed a potential prequel or sequel to Mads with the film's producers, and "started writing some lines about something that could happen to [Julia] later" with the possibility of "some of the other characters coming back in another way".
