= The Black Box (2005 film) =

- Theatrical poster
- French: La Boîte noire
- Directed by: Richard Berry
- Written by: Richard Berry and Éric Assous
- Produced by: Michel Feller
- Starring: José Garcia; Marion Cotillard
- Cinematography: Thomas Hardmeier
- Edited by: Lisa Pfeiffer
- Music by: Nathaniel Méchaly
- Distributed by: EuropaCorp. Distribution
- Release date: 2 November 2005
- Running time: 90 minutes
- Country: France
- Language: French
- Budget: $8.5 million
- Box office: $3.1 million

The Black Box (French: La Boîte noire) is a 2005 French mystery film directed by Richard Berry, written by Berry and Éric Assous, adapted from a novella by Tonino Benacquista, and starring José Garcia and Marion Cotillard.

== Plot ==
Following a car accident, in which he believes he killed a boy, Arthur Seligman falls into a coma for several hours. While in the coma, he pronounces incoherent sentences. At his awakening, he does not remember what happened before the crash, and he does not know the meaning of the words he pronounced while unconscious. The nurse who assisted him, Isabelle Kruger, recorded them in a notebook, which she gives to him. Arthur then tries to understand what happened, what those sentences mean, and begins to lose his grasp of reality.

== Cast ==
- José Garcia as Arthur Seligman
- Marion Cotillard as Isabelle Kruger / Alice
- Michel Duchaussoy as Mr. Seligman
- Bernard Le Coq as Walcott / Doctor Granger
- Helena Noguerra as Soraya
- Gérald Laroche as Commissioner Marc Koskas
- Marysa Borini as Mrs. Seligman
- Nathalie Nell as Dr. Brenner
- Thomas Chabrol as Thierry
- Pascal Bongard as Clovis
- Marilou Berry as The desk clerk
- Lise Lamétrie as The guardian
