= Caiti Blues =

- Directed by: Justine Harbonnier
- Written by: Justine Harbonnier
- Produced by: Julie Paratian
- Starring: Caiti Lord
- Cinematography: Justine Harbonnier; Léna Mill-Reuillard
- Edited by: Maxime Faure; Xi Feng
- Music by: Caiti Lord
- Production companies: Cinquième Maison; Sister Productions
- Release date: April 22, 2023 (Visions du Réel)
- Running time: 84 minutes
- Countries: Canada; France
- Language: English

Caiti Blues is a Canadian-French documentary film, directed by Justine Harbonnier and released in 2023.

== Synopsis ==
The film is a portrait of Caiti Lord, a young musician who is living in an artists' colony in Madrid, New Mexico.

== Production ==
Caiti Blues was directed by Quebec-based filmmaker Justine Harbonnier.

The film was produced by French producer Julie Paratian via her company Sister Productions.

== Release and reception ==
The film premiered on April 22, 2023, at the Visions du Réel festival in Nyon, Switzerland.

It was screened at the 2023 Hot Docs Canadian International Documentary Festival.

== Critical reception ==
Andrew Parker wrote in TheGATE.ca that Caiti Blues "is the type of relaxed, but emotionally resonant drama that some fictional filmmakers spend their entire lives trying to achieve, but Harbonnier has lucked into it naturally", and also praised the candour of the subject and the editing of the film.

== Accolades ==
Caiti Blues won the Special Jury Prize for the Hot Docs Award for Best Canadian Feature Documentary at the 2023 edition of the Hot Docs festival.
