= I Never Promised You a Jasmine Garden =

2024 Canadian short film directed by Teyama Alkamli

- Directed by: Teyama Alkamli
- Written by: Teyama Alkamli
- Produced by: Teyama Alkamli
- Starring: Tara Hakim; Sandy El-Bitar
- Cinematography: Thomas Szacka-Marier
- Edited by: Xi Feng
- Production company: Limbic Films
- Distributed by: La Distributrice de films
- Release date: March 23, 2024 (CFF)
- Running time: 20 minutes
- Country: Canada
- Languages: Arabic; English

I Never Promised You a Jasmine Garden is a Canadian short drama film, written and directed by Teyama Alkamli and released in 2024. The film stars Tara Hakim as Tara, a queer Palestinian-Canadian woman struggling to suppress her emotions during a phone call with her best friend Sarab (Sandy El-Bitar).

The film was screened in Telefilm Canada's annual Not Short on Talent showcase at the 2023 Cannes Film Festival, and had its public premiere at the 2024 Canadian Film Festival. It was subsequently screened at the 2024 Inside Out Film and Video Festival, and was submitted to the 2024 Iris Prize competition for LGBTQ films.

== Awards ==
Award	Year	Category	Recipient	Result	Ref.
Canadian Screen Awards	2025	Best Performance in a Live Action Short Drama	Tara Hakim	Nominated	
