= Laurent Brunet =

French cinematographer

- Born: 1967 (age 58–59); France
- Awards: Best Cinematography; 2009 Séraphine

Laurent Brunet (born 1967) is a French César Award-winning cinematographer for Séraphine (2008) by Martin Provost. He is widely known for his work on the films of Raphael Nadjari. Brunet shot all five of Raphael Nadjari's feature films as well as Amos Gitai's Free Zone and Keren Yedaya's Or (My Treasure) as well as Christophe Honoré's The Beautiful Person.

== Selected filmography ==
- 1999: The Shade (1998 film)
- 2001: I Am Josh Polonski's Brother
- 2002: Apartment#5C
- 2004: Avanim
- 2004: Or (My Treasure)
- 2005: Little Jerusalem
- 2005: Free Zone
- 2007: Tehilim
- 2007: Le Fils de L'Épicier
- 2007: Plum Rain
- 2007: Le Blues de l'Orient
- 2007: Vous êtes de la police?
- 2008: The Beautiful Person
- 2008: Séraphine
- 2012: Maman
- 2014: That Lovely Girl
- 2015: Microbe & Gasoline
- 2015: Papa lumière
- 2015: Boomerang
- 2016: Faultless (Irréprochable)
- 2016: Trainee Day
- 2018: Tel Aviv on Fire
- 2019: Arab Blues
- 2019: Enormous
