= The Shade (film) =

- French release poster
- Directed by: Raphael Nadjari
- Written by: Raphael Nadjari
- Produced by: Geoffroy Grison; Francesca Feder
- Starring: Richard Edson; Lorie Marino
- Cinematography: Laurent Brunet
- Edited by: Tom Donahue
- Music by: John Surman
- Release date: 21 May 1999 (Cannes)
- Country: United States
- Language: English

The Shade is a 1999 American drama film directed by Raphael Nadjari and starring Richard Edson and Lorie Marino. It is Nadjari's debut film. The Shade is a modern adaptation of Fyodor Dostoyevsky's short story "A Gentle Creature" (1876) and takes place in contemporary New York City.

== Plot ==
The film begins with Simon, a Jewish middle-aged pawnbroker, alone in his apartment with the corpse of his wife, Anna, who has just committed suicide. In his grief, Simon remembers the first time he met Anna. The film flashes back to a year prior when mysterious Anna walks into Simon's pawnbroker shop in Spanish Harlem. Seeming to come from nowhere, Anna impresses solitary Simon with her beauty, and he proposes to her on their first night out. They then enter into a passionate relationship that leads her to death.

== Awards and nominations ==
- 1999 Cannes Film Festival - Official Selection, Un Certain Regard
- Bergamo Film Festival (1999) - Audience Award
