= Should the Wind Drop =

2020 film

- French: Si le vent tombe
- Armenian: Երբ որ քամին հանդարտվի
- Directed by: Nora Martirosyan
- Written by: Nora Martirosyan; Emmanuelle Pagano; Olivier Torres; Guillaume André
- Starring: Grégoire Colin; Hayk Bakhryan; Arman Navasardyan; David Hakobyan; Vartan Petrossian; Narine Grigoryan
- Cinematography: Simon Roca
- Edited by: Nora Martirosyan; Yorgos Lamprinos
- Music by: Pierre-Yves Cruaud
- Production companies: SISTER Productions; Aneva Production; Kwassa Films
- Release date: August 30, 2020 (Angoulême)
- Running time: 100 minutes
- Countries: Armenia; Belgium; France
- Languages: French; Armenian; English; Russian

Should the Wind Drop (French: Si le vent tombe, Armenian: Երբ որ քամին հանդարտվի Yerb vor k’amin handartvi, previously known as Should the Wind Fall) is a 2020 Armenian-Belgian-French drama film directed by Nora Martirosyan and starring Grégoire Colin and Hayk Bakhryan. The film was produced by Sister Productions in France, Kwassa Films in Belgium, and Aneva in Armenia. The film was selected for the 73rd edition of the Cannes Festival. The film was screened in the 2020 Angoulême Francophone Film Festival. The film was screened as part of Industry Selects at the 2020 Toronto International Film Festival. The film was screened in the competition part of the 2020 Tokyo Filmex. It was also selected as the Armenian entry for the Best International Feature Film at the 94th Academy Awards.

== Plot ==
An auditor is charged with appraising if Stepanakert Airport in the small, breakaway Republic of Artsakh in the Caucasus meets international aviation standards. He finds himself connecting with a young local boy to help the isolated territory open up to the outside world.

== See also ==
- List of submissions to the 94th Academy Awards for Best International Feature Film
- List of Armenian submissions for the Academy Award for Best International Feature Film
