= Notre musique =

Notre Musique
- Directed by: Jean-Luc Godard
- Written by: Jean-Luc Godard
- Produced by: Alain Sarde; Ruth Waldburger
- Starring: Sarah Adler; Nade Dieu; George Aguilar; Jean-Luc Godard; Rony Kramer
- Cinematography: Jean-Christophe Beauvallet; Julien Hirsch
- Production companies: Avventura Films; Peripheria; France 3 Cinéma; Vega Film; Canal Plus; TSR Regio DFI
- Distributed by: Les Films du Losange (France); Vega Film (Switzerland)
- Release date: May 19, 2004
- Running time: 80 minutes
- Countries: France; Switzerland
- Languages: French; Arabic; English; Hebrew; Serbo-Croatian; Spanish

Notre musique (English: Our Music) is a 2004 film directed by Jean-Luc Godard. The film reflects on violence, morality, and the representation of violence in film, and touches especially on past colonialism and the current Israeli–Palestinian conflict. It was screened out of competition at the 2004 Cannes Film Festival.

Notre musique received positive reviews from critics.

== Plot ==
The film is divided into three parts inspired by the Divine Comedy of Dante. "Realm 1: Hell" is a relatively brief, non-narrative montage composed of appropriated documentary and narrative fictional footage depicting war, carnage, and violence.

The second segment, "Realm 2: Purgatory", makes up the bulk of the film. Godard, playing himself, is waiting at the airport to depart to a European arts conference in Sarajevo. There he meets Ramos Garcia, a nationalized French Israeli, who is going to the conference as an interpreter. Ramos is looking forward to seeing his niece at the conference, Olga Brodsky, a French-speaking Jew of Russian descent. Another young woman at the conference, Judith Lerner, a journalist from Tel Aviv, visits the French ambassador and entreats him to have an on-the-record conversation about Jewish-Palestinian relations ("not a just conversation; just a conversation"). Later she interviews the poet Mahmoud Darwish, who says that Israel defines the Palestinian struggle. In between these encounters, Judith surveys the city, and visits the Mostar bridge, where she reads Emmanuel Levinas (Entre Nous).

Meanwhile, Olga attends Godard's lecture, ostensibly about the relationship between image and text. In addition to touching on a variety of other topics, Godard explains his opposition to the common cinematic trope of "shot/reverse shot," the cutting back and forth between two characters in a conversation or an exchange. Godard explains that presenting two characters in such a way, framed identically, regressively effaces their differences, and can be used as a tool of propaganda. Later Olga meets with her uncle Ramos, and discusses with him the philosophical problem of suicide.

After the conference, Godard is back home, watering his garden. He gets a call from Ramos Garcia, who tells Godard about a young woman who ran into a theater and declared she had a bomb in her bag. She asked for one person to die with her for Israeli-Palestinian peace; everyone left the theater. The police came and shot her. When they opened her bag, all they found were books. Garcia tells Godard that he is sure it was Olga.

In "Realm 3: Heaven," a brief postlude, Olga wanders contemplatively through an idyllic lakeside setting that appears to be guarded by American marines.

The soundtrack features Hans Otte, György Kurtág, J.S. Bach, Meredith Monk, and Alexander Knaifel amongst others.

== Critical reception ==
The film received generally positive reviews from critics. The review aggregator Rotten Tomatoes reported that 65% of critics gave the film positive reviews, based on 52 reviews. Metacritic reported the film had an average score of 77 out of 100, based on 19 reviews.

In Senses of Cinema, Christopher Weedman wrote that Notre musique is Godard's "most equitable examination of the Israeli-Palestinian conflict". J. Hoberman wrote that the film is "heartfelt in its desire to simply acknowledge, as the philosopher Emmanuel Levinas might have put it, the preeminence of the Other."

== Awards and nominations ==
- European Film Awards
  - Nominated: Best Actress (Sarah Adler)
  - Nominated: Best Screenwriter (Jean-Luc Godard)
- San Sebastián Film Festival (Spain)
  - Won: FIPRESCI Film of the Year (Jean-Luc Godard)
