= Richard Edson =

American actor (born 1954)

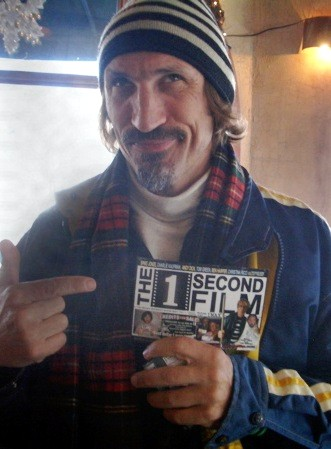
- Edson in 2006
- Born: January 1, 1954 (age 72); New Rochelle, New York, U.S.
- Occupations: Actor, musician
- Years active: 1979–present

Richard Edson (born January 1, 1954) is an American actor and musician.

== Personal life ==
Edson was born in New Rochelle, New York to a Jewish family. He has one brother, Steven, who resides in the Boston area, and two sisters, Andrea, who resides in Newton, Massachusetts, and Jennifer, who resides in New York City. His father, Arnold (1917–2012), was one of the first Marine officers to land at Guadalcanal in August 1942. After the war, his father became a toy manufacturer. His mother, Marian, a retired school teacher, resides in New Rochelle.

== Music career ==
In 1979, Edson was a founding member of the San Francisco art rock band The Alterboys with Snuky Tate, Tono Rondone, Richard Kelly and JC Garrett, playing both drums and trumpet. From 1981 to 1982, he was Sonic Youth's original drummer and played drums for Konk at the same time. Following the release of Sonic Youth's self-titled debut EP, Edson left the band to play with Konk full-time. Edson also played trumpet with San Francisco band The Offs on the group's eponymous 1984 album.

Edson composed the soundtrack for Alexandre Rockwell's feature film The Projectionist (2026).

== Acting career ==
Following his music career, Edson has worked as an actor, appearing in over 35 movies. His more notable roles include a disreputable parking garage attendant in Ferris Bueller's Day Off (1986), man at newspaper stand in Desperately Seeking Susan (1985), Richie in Howard the Duck (1986), Eddie in Jim Jarmusch's cult film Stranger Than Paradise (1984), real-life gambler Billy Maharg in Eight Men Out (1988), and the title character in Joey Breaker (1993). He also appeared in Platoon (1986), Good Morning, Vietnam (1987), Tougher Than Leather (1988), Let It Ride (1989), and Do the Right Thing (1989). He starred in the 1993 movie Super Mario Bros as Spike, King Koopa's cousin. In 1987, Edson performed a main role live in the Scott B and Joseph Nechvatal collaboration called Not a Door: A Spectacle at Hallwalls, based on the poetry of St. John of the Cross, Flaubert's Temptation of St. Anthony and works of Jean Genet and Georges Bataille.

Edson played the lead role in three films directed by Raphaël Nadjari: The Shade (1999), I Am Josh Polonski's Brother (2001) and Apartment #5c (2002). In 2003, he appeared in the music video for Cave In's single, "Anchor". Edson played the central character of the video, a depressed man walking down the street with his feet encased in cement blocks. He also appeared in Frankenfish (2004).

His television appearances include The Adventures of Pete & Pete; the third-season finale of Homicide: Life on the Street; and the 1990–91 series Shannon's Deal, produced by John Sayles. Edson appeared in a 2007 TV commercial for The Travelers Companies Inc., in which he plays the human personification of risk.

== Selected filmography ==
- 1984 Stranger Than Paradise as Eddie
- 1985 Desperately Seeking Susan as Man With Newspapers
- 1986 Ferris Bueller's Day Off as Garage Attendant
- 1986 Howard the Duck as Ritchie
- 1986 Crime Story (TV Series) as Jake Rennick
- 1986 Platoon as Sal
- 1986 Walker as Turley
- 1987 Good Morning, Vietnam as Private Abersold
- 1988 Eight Men Out as Billy Maharg
- 1988 Tougher Than Leather as Bernie Carteez
- 1988 The Chair as Riot Leader
- 1989 Bloodhounds of Broadway as Johnny Crackow
- 1989 Do the Right Thing as Vito
- 1989 Let It Ride as Johnny Casino
- 1989 Monsters (TV Series) as Jack Bateman
- 1990-1991 Shannon's Deal (TV series)
- 1991 Eyes of an Angel as Goon
- 1992 Love Is Like That as Bubba-Lilly
- 1992 Crossing the Bridge as Mitchell
- 1993 Split Ends (TV Series) as Eric
- 1993 Joey Breaker as Joey Breaker
- 1993 Posse as Deputy Tom
- 1993 Super Mario Bros. as Spike
- 1993 What About Me as Nick
- 1993 Love, Cheat & Steal as Billy Quayle
- 1995 Jury Duty as Skeets
- 1995 Destiny Turns on the Radio as Gage
- 1995 Strange Days as 'Tick'
- 1996 Scorpion Spring as Lem Wells
- 1996 Marco Polo The Missing Chapter as Bergman
- 1996 Cosas que nunca te dije as Steve
- 1996 The Winner as Frankie
- 1996 Wedding Bell Blues as Tom
- 1996 An Occasional Hell as Rodney Gillen
- 1997 This World, Then the Fireworks as Joe
- 1997 Snide and Prejudice as Rudolph Hess
- 1997 Double Tap as Fischer
- 1998 Lulu on the Bridge as Dave Reilly
- 1999 Thick as Thieves as Danny
- 1999 Purgatory (TV Movie) as Euripides
- 1999 The Shade as Simon
- 1999 Jack of Hearts as Henry
- 2000 Cement as Robbo
- 2000 The Million Dollar Hotel as Joe
- 2000 Timecode as Lester Moore
- 2000 Picking Up the Pieces as Edsel Farkus
- 2000 A Man Is Mostly Water as Bud Guy
- 2000 Desperate but Not Serious as Screenwriter
- 2001 I Am Josh Polonski's Brother as Abe Polonski
- 2001 Southlander: Diary of a Desperate Musician as Thomas
- 2001 P.O.V. - Point of View as Fool On Hill
- 2002 Sunshine State as Steve Tregaskis
- 2002 Apartment #5C as Harold
- 2003 Highway to Oblivion (TV Movie) as Leslie
- 2004 Starsky & Hutch as Monix
- 2004 Land of Plenty as Jimmy
- 2004 Frankenfish (TV Movie) as Roland
- 2004 Goodnight, Joseph Parker as Frankie
- 2005 Welcome to California as Husband / Sylvio
- 2005 The Kid & I as Guy Prince
- 2006 Hard Scrambled as Joe
- 2006 The Astronaut Farmer as Chopper Miller
- 2006 Cut Off as Mikey
- 2007 Under There (Short) as Roman
- 2008 Japan as Gus
- 2008 Momma's Man as Tom
- 2008 Columbus Day as Manny
- 2008 Vicious Circle as John
- 2009 Black Dynamite as Dino
- 2009 The Smell of Success as Nelly 'The Nose '
- 2009 The Greims (Short) as Larry
- 2010 NUMB3RS (TV Series) as Nick Rowland
- 2010 Happiness Runs as Pete
- 2010 Hands & Eyes (Short) as The Artist
- 2012 A Glimpse Inside the Mind of Charles Swan III as Sanchez
- 2012 Averageman
- 2014 Dark Hearts as Ravetti
- 2015 3 Holes and a Smoking Gun as Sam Dunkim
- 2015 Dutch Book as Billy Santiago
- 2018 Burning Shadow as Ronald
- 2019 3 from Hell as Carlos Perro
