= Aya (2012 film) =

2012 film

- Film poster
- Directed by: Oded Binnun; Mihal Brezis
- Written by: Oded Binnun; Mihal Brezis; Tom Shoval
- Starring: Sarah Adler
- Release date: 1 September 2012 (Israel)
- Running time: 40 minutes
- Countries: France; Israel
- Languages: English; Hebrew

Aya is a 2012 French-Israeli short drama film directed by Oded Binnun and Mihal Brezis. The film was nominated for the Academy Award for Best Live Action Short Film at the 87th Academy Awards, but did not win.

In 2025, the directors released a full-length feature, Dead Language based on the original short film, with the same lead actors- Israeli actress Sarah Adler and Danish actor Ulrich Thomsen.

== Plot ==
Aya is waiting for someone at the Ben Gurion International Airport. A driver asks her to hold his welcome sign for Mr. Overby, who is flying into Israel to judge the Arthur Rubinstein piano competition. When the Danish juror shows up, Aya decides on an impulse to drive him to his hotel in Jerusalem. During the car ride, an unexpected intimacy develops between Aya and the reserved Overby.

== Cast ==
- Sarah Adler as Aya
- Ulrich Thomsen as Mr. Overby
