= Xi Feng =

Canadian film editor

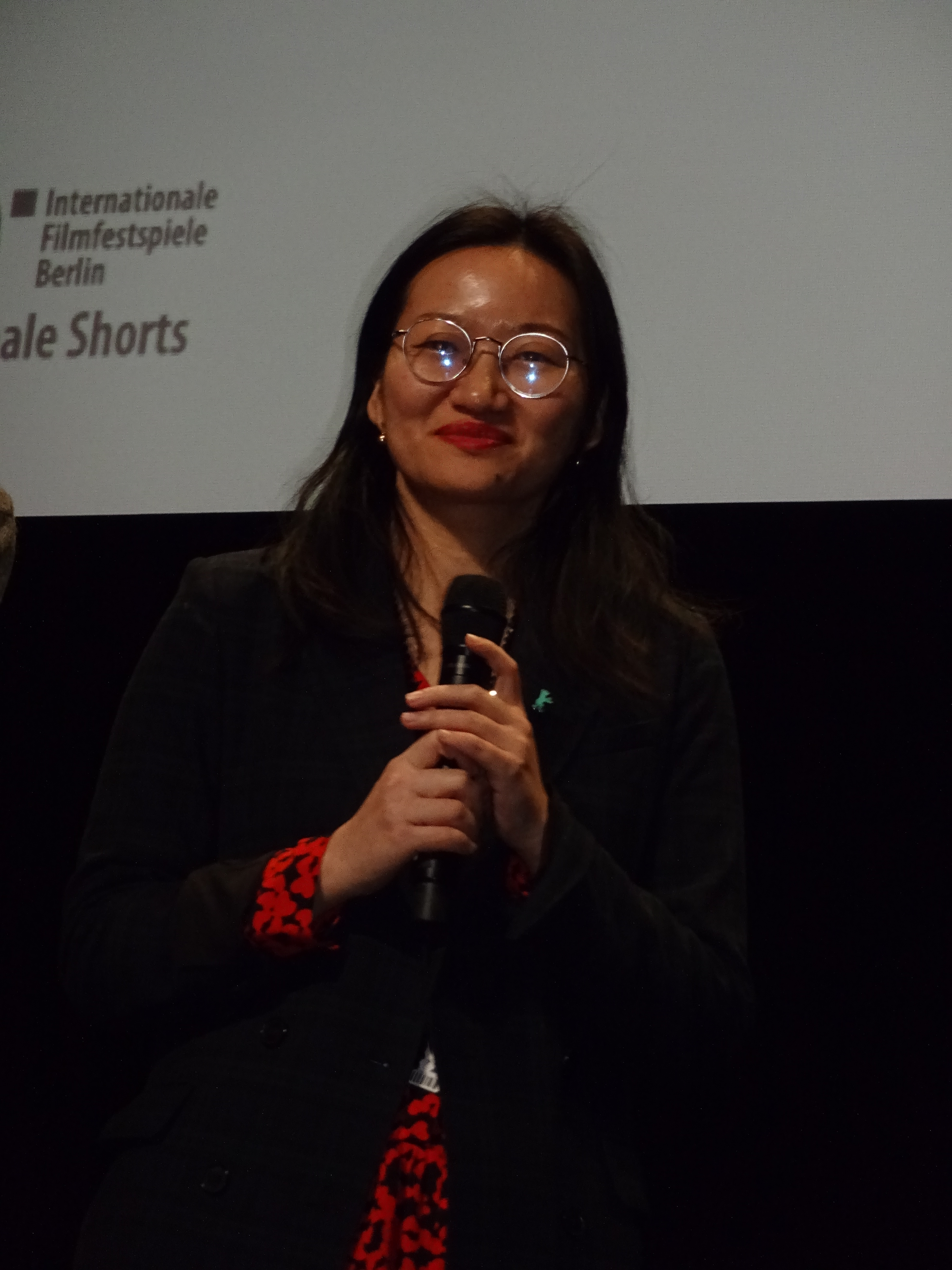
- Occupation: Film editor
- Years active: 2000s–present

Xi Feng is a Canadian film editor. She is most noted for her work on the film Universal Language, for which she won the Canadian Screen Award for Best Editing at the 13th Canadian Screen Awards in 2025.

Her other credits have include the films Mutts (Clebs), Sing Me a Lullaby, Babushka, This House (Cette maison), Caiti Blues, Fantas, Village Keeper, Lucky Star, I Never Promised You a Jasmine Garden, Shifting Baselines and Where the River Begins (Donde comenzia el rio).

She is currently the Quebec regional chair of Canadian Cinema Editors.
