= Mutts (film) =

2019 Canadian short documentary film

- Film poster
- French: Clebs
- Directed by: Halima Ouardiri
- Written by: Halima Ouardiri
- Produced by: Halima Ouardiri
- Cinematography: Anna Cooley
- Edited by: Xi Feng
- Distributed by: La Distributrice de Films
- Release date: November 17, 2019 (RIDM)
- Running time: 18 minutes
- Country: Canada
- Language: Arabic

Mutts (French: Clebs) is a 2019 Canadian short documentary film written, directed and produced by Halima Ouardiri. The film is a portrait of a sanctuary for stray dogs in Morocco. It won two awards at the Berlin Film Festival and received Canadian Screen Award and Prix Iris nominations for Best Short Documentary.

== Synopsis ==
The film observes about 750 stray dogs living in a shelter in Agadir, Morocco, where they are cared for while awaiting possible adoption. It shows the dogs feeding, resting and fighting within the shelter. Near the end, the only human voice heard is a radio announcer reporting on refugee flows around the world.

== Release and festival screenings ==
The film premiered on November 17, 2019, at the Montreal International Documentary Festival. It was subsequently screened at the 2020 Berlin Film Festival and the 2020 Festival International du Film Francophone de Namur.

== Reception ==
Sam Broadway of Mail & Guardian described Mutts as “beautiful and broad” and “deceptively simple”. He wrote that the film was “far from being an animal rights documentary” and interpreted the dogs as “symbols of our own human condition”.

Marina D. Richter of Ubiquarian wrote that the film could be read as a metaphor, but that this interpretation alone would do the film an injustice. She praised Ouardiri’s direction and Anna Cooley’s camera work, and described the film as projecting a “universal story of seclusion and entrapment”.

== Awards and nominations ==
At the 2020 Berlin Film Festival, Mutts won the Crystal Bear for best short film in the Generation 14plus section and the Special Prize of the Generation 14plus International Jury. It also won the jury prize at the 2020 Festival International du Film Francophone de Namur.

In 2021, it received a Canadian Screen Award nomination for Best Short Documentary at the 9th Canadian Screen Awards, and a Prix Iris nomination for Best Short Documentary at the 23rd Quebec Cinema Awards.
