= Noah Harlan =

American film producer

Noah Harlan is an independent film producer and Founder of Two Bulls digital studio. He has produced or co-produced seven feature films, including three with director Raphael Nadjari: Avanim (2004), Tehilim (2007), and Ce que mes yeux ont vu (2007). Harlan received a New England Emmy Award in "Advanced Media Interactivity" in 2008.

Harlan grew up in Cranbury, New Jersey. graduated from Williams College in 1997 with a degree in Computer Science. He also studied at Trinity College (University of Melbourne) and the British American Drama Academy.

He lives in Manhattan with his wife, author Micol Ostow.
