= I Am Josh Polonski's Brother =

- I Am Josh Polonski's Brother poster
- Directed by: Raphael Nadjari
- Written by: Raphaël Nadjari
- Produced by: Caroline Bonmarchand; Tom Donahue; Francesca Feder; Anne Feinsilber; Geoffroy Grison
- Starring: Richard Edson; Jeff Ware; Meg Hartig; Arnold Barkus; Ivan Martin
- Cinematography: Laurent Brunet
- Edited by: Tom Donahue
- Music by: Vincent Segal; Jean-Pierre Sluys
- Distributed by: MK2 Diffusion
- Release date: June 6, 2001
- Running time: 87 minutes
- Countries: France; United States
- Language: English

I Am Josh Polonski's Brother is Raphael Nadjari's second feature film. It was shot in New York City in 1999 and early 2000, in Super 8mm 200 ASA. The film premiered at the Berlin Film Festival in the Forum.

== Plot ==
The Polonski brothers, Abe, Ben and Josh, work together in their family's fabric store on the lower east side of Manhattan. Like any other Jewish family they go to their mother's to spend the Sabbath together. But one day, Josh is shot to death in the middle of the street in front of Abe's eyes.. For Ben the tragic situation has an explanation - the nightlife of Josh - but Abe wants to understand what happened. Following the path of his brother, he walks in the same footsteps, finding more and more of himself.

== Production and release ==
Shot in two period, one of 15 days during December 1999 and a few days of retakes in April 2000, in Super-8 format and improvised with no script, I Am Josh Polonski's Brother was shot mainly in Orchard Street in New York City, it includes rare footage of Rivington Street's First Roumanian-American congregation. The film premiered at the Forum of Young Cinema in the Berlin Film Festival. The film was then released in France by distributor MK2 and more than 50,000 people came to see it in theaters even though it was shot in Super 8mm. Kodak supported the film to prove that it was possible to create a narrative feature in Super-8 format in the midst of the digital age. Nadjari not only proved it but demonstrated that the digital age, instead of reducing media to its own format, is in fact a great system of expanding the possibilities of most film and video formats.

Nadjari's idea is that the digital age is an archiving system that enables any other format to fit, not technically, but more to integrate with the story we want to tell. It is thus possible to use almost any recording device and have it fit to a narrative integration. Here the film was about family and nostalgia for film of the 70's, Super-8 film was the best format to fuse the format with its content.

== Awards and nominations ==
- Berlin Film Festival (2001) - Forum of Young Cinema
