= Students Across the Seven Seas =

2005 novel

- Pardon my French cover
- Language: English
- Genre: Young adult
- Publisher: Penguin
- Publication date: 2005 (first volume)
- Publication place: United States
- Media type: Print Paperback)
- Website: =

Students Across the Seven Seas (S.A.S.S.) is a young adult novel series published by Penguin between 2005 and 2010. It is a multi-author series based on the idea of studying abroad. Students Across the Seven Seas (or "S.A.S.S." for short) is the name of the fictional study abroad organization which arranges the visits. Each book centers on an American teenage girl and her experiences studying abroad in a foreign country such as France, Spain, Sweden or Italy. The titles of the books are witty plays on words featuring the country and a common phrase, such as Spain or Shine and Swede Dreams.

== Books (in order of publishing) ==
- Westminster Abby by Micol Ostow. Set in England with main character Abby. (May 5, 2005)
- Getting the Boot by Peggy Guthart Strauss. Set in Italy with main character Kelly. (May 5, 2005)
- Spain or Shine by Michelle Jellen. Set in Spain with main character Elena. (September 8, 2005)
- Pardon my French by Cathy Hapka. Set in France with main character Nicole. (November 3, 2005)
- The Sound of Munich by Suzanne Nelson. Set in Germany with main character Siena. (March 2, 2006)
- Heart and Salsa by Suzanne Nelson. Set in Mexico with main character Cat. (June 1, 2006)
- Now and Zen by Linda Gerber. Set in Japan with main character Nori. (September 7, 2006)
- Swede Dreams by Eva Apelqvist. Set in Sweden with main character Calista. (February 15, 2007)
- Girl Overboard by Aimee Ferris. Set in the Caribbean with main character Marina. (May 10, 2007)
- The Finnish Line by Linda Gerber. Set in Finland with main character Mo. (October 4, 2007)
- When Irish Guys Are Smiling by Suzanne Supplee. Set in Ireland with main character Delk. (January 10, 2008)
- French Kissmas by Cathy Hapka. A sequel to "Pardon My French," it takes place in France and has Nicole as the main character. (September 11, 2008)
- The Great Call of China by Cynthea Liu. Set in China with main character Cece. (February 19, 2009)
- Up Over Down Under by Micol Ostow and Noah Harlan. Set in Melbourne, Australia and Washington, D.C., with the main characters Eliza (an American girl who goes to Australia) and Billie (an Australian girl who goes to America). (April 29, 2010)
