= Avanim =

2004 film directed by Raphael Nadjari

Avanim אבנים
- Theatrical poster
- Directed by: Raphael Nadjari
- Written by: Raphael Nadjari
- Produced by: Geoffroy Grison; Marek Rozenbaum; Itai Tamir; Noah Harlan (co); Jean Labib (co)
- Starring: Asi Levi; Danny Steg; Uri Gavriel
- Cinematography: Laurent Brunet
- Edited by: Godefroy Fouray
- Music by: Nathaniel Méchaly
- Release dates: February 2004 (Berlin Film Festival); 14 July 2004 (Jerusalem Film Festival); 16 March 2005 (France)
- Countries: Israel; France; United States
- Language: Hebrew

Avanim (Hebrew: אבנים) is Raphael Nadjari's fourth feature film. It was shot in and around Tel Aviv in 2003, in HDCam. The film was presented in the Berlin Film Festival as a Panorama: Special presentation in 2004.

The screenplay was also written by Raphaël Nadjari, marking his first film in Hebrew. The story revolves around a woman dissatisfied with her family life and career who decides to unburden herself and start anew after her close friend is killed by a thrown stone. Stones were placed on her grave during the funeral, inspiring the film's title.

The name of the film is derived from the Hebrew word for stones, which in Hebrew, holds deep cultural and religious significance.

The film employs a Dogme 95-inspired aesthetic, characterized by intense improvisation and grainy digital video close-ups, amplifying the claustrophobic atmosphere.

== Plot ==
Michale is a woman in her mid-30s. She is married with a young son and works in her father's Tel Aviv accounting firm, which serves religious institutions. She divides her time between her child, her husband, her work, and the man with whom she is having an affair. When Michale learns of her lover's sudden death, her life is shattered.

== Cast ==
- Asi Levi (Michale)
- Uri Gavriel (Meir)
- Florence Bloch (Nehama Tinski)
- Shaul Mizrahi (Gabai)
- Danny Steg (Shmoulik)
- Gabi Amrani-Gur (Rav Ozeri)
- Eli Eltonyo (Gabriel)

== Release ==
Following its premiere as a Panorama Special presentation at the Berlin Film Festival, Avanim premiered in New York at the Museum of Modern Art (MoMA) and was released theatrically in France later that year.

== Awards and nominations ==
- Berlin Film Festival (2004) - Panorama
- Cinema Tout Ecran (Geneva) - Winner, Best Film
- Seville European Film Festival - Winner, Golden Giraldillo to Best Film
- France Culture - Winner, Director of the Year
- European Film Awards - Nominee, Best Actress (Asi Levi)
