= Photoplay edition =

Movie tie-in books of the silent film and early sound era

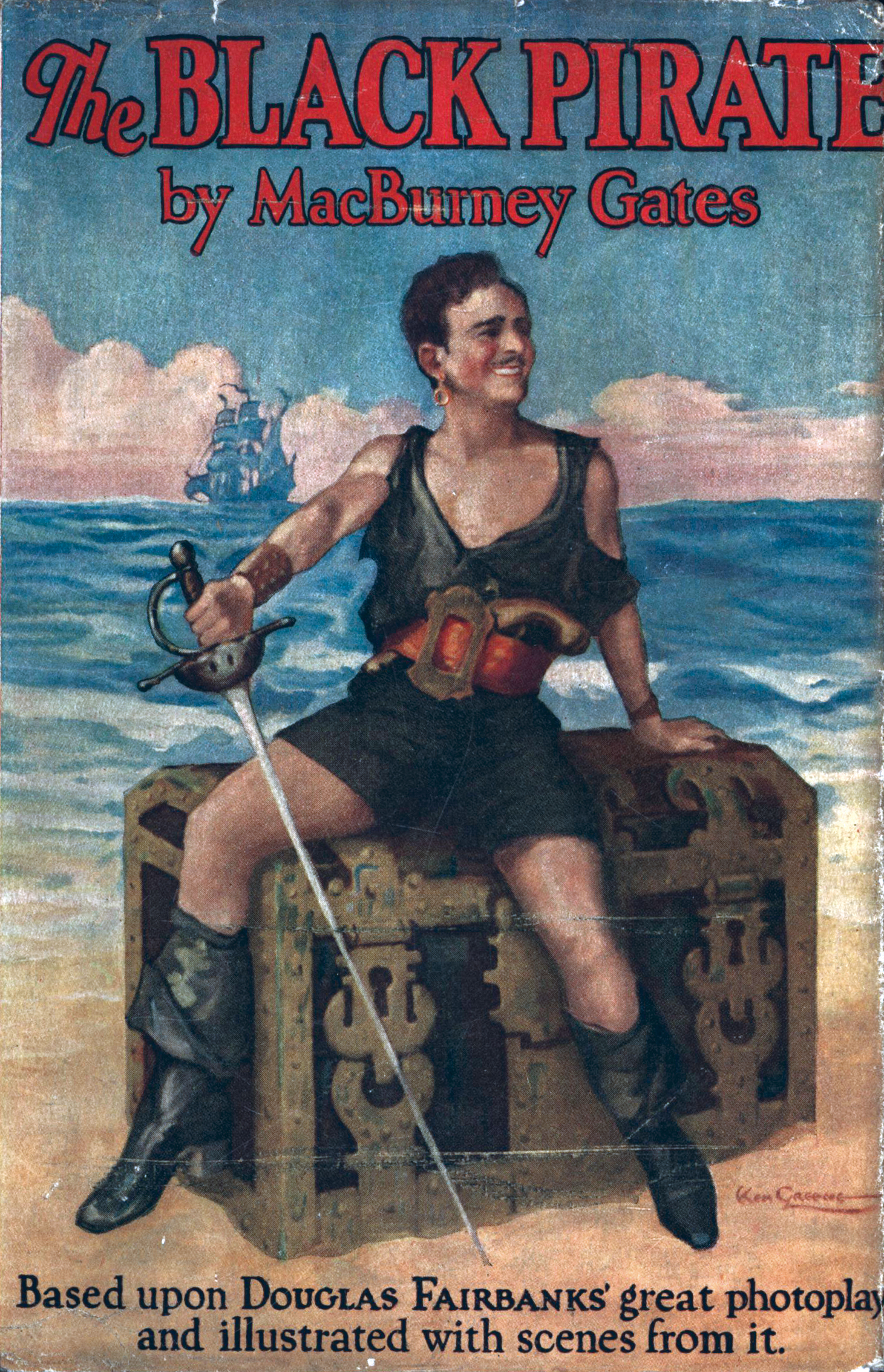
Front cover of The Black Pirate (1926), a movie-tie in to the 1926 film starring Douglas Fairbanks, published by Grosset & Dunlap

Photoplay edition refers to movie tie-in books of the silent film and early sound era at a time when motion pictures were known as "photoplays". Typically, photoplay editions were reprints of novels additionally illustrated with scenes from a film production. Less typically, photoplay editions were novelizations of films, where the film script was fictionalized in narrative form. Today, vintage photoplay editions are sought after by film buffs, bibliophiles, and collectors.

The first photoplay editions were published around 1912, and as a genre, they reached their height in the 1920s and 1930s. Thousands of different titles were issued in the United States. Most photoplays were published in hardback by companies like Grosset & Dunlap or A. L. Burt, and some in soft cover by companies like Jacobsen Hodgkinson. Similar movie related books were also published in England, France, Spain and elsewhere.

Typically, photoplay editions of the 1920s and 1930s contained stills and/or a dust jacket featuring artwork or actors from a film. Deluxe editions might also contain a special binding, illustrated end papers or, rarely, a written introduction by the star of the film. Sometimes, the spine or cover of the book will note the edition is a "photoplay edition."

Illustrated movie tie-in books continued to be published though the 1940s, 1950s, and into the 1960s. Today, novels published in conjunction with the release of a film will often feature an actor or actress on the cover of the book, but without the interior illustrations.

Today, the most sought after photoplays are those tie-in editions for favorite films such as Dracula, Frankenstein and King Kong, or lost films such as London After Midnight. Other collectors search for books featuring individuals stars, like Louise Brooks or Rudolph Valentino. Published by Grosset & Dunlap in 1927, The General is today one of the most sought after of photoplay books. Not only did the Joseph Warren novel make its first appearance in print as a photoplay, but the book is the only photoplay edition to feature film star Buster Keaton.

== Guidebooks ==
Emil Petaja's Photoplay Edition was the first book published on the subject.

Photoplay Edition (SISU, 1975), by the noted science fiction and fantasy author Emil Petaja, was the first book on the subject. Petaja based the book on his collection of photoplays, which at the time of publication numbered more than eight hundred. Petaja had owned many rare examples, including a few autographed by film stars.

Petaja's Photoplay Edition is composed of a checklist of books, with each entry detailing the book's movie title (which sometimes differed from the title of the novel), as well as its author, publisher, date of release, the motion picture company which produced the film, its leading actors, and the number of illustrations included within the book. Illustrating Petaja's guide are dozens of dust jackets and scene stills, each of which graced the original editions. Petaja also offers a short prologue, a longer history of photoplay books, and an anecdotal chapter telling the story of the author's involvement in collecting these books.

Photoplay Edition has been surpassed by later, more comprehensive, illustrated guides. These include Arnie Davis' Photoplay Editions and Other Movie Tie-In Books (Mainely Books, 2002), and Rick Miller's Photoplay Editions: A Collector's Guide (McFarland, 2002). Each list more than the 800 examples found in Petaja's pioneering guide. Thomas Mann's Horror and Mystery Photoplay Editions and Magazine Fictionizations (McFarland, 2004) examines genre editions.
