= Camp Confidential =

Book series by Melissa J. Morgan

Camp Confidential is a US book series for preteens written by Melissa J. Morgan. It focuses around a group of girls at Camp Lakeview (Later Camp Walla Walla). There are 25 books in this series so far. The series is also sold in the UK under the name Summer Camp Secrets published by Usborne Publishing.

== Books ==
1. Natalie's Secret
2. Jenna's Dilemma
3. Grace's Twist
4. Alex's Challenge
5. TTYL
6. RSVP
7. Second Time's the Charm
8. Wish You Weren't Here
9. Best (Boy) Friend Forever
10. Over and Out
11. Falling In Like
12. Winter Games
13. A Fair To Remember
14. Hide and Shriek (Scary Super Special)
15. Reality Bites
16. Golden Girls
17. Freaky Tuesday
18. And the Winner Is...
19. Charmed Forces (Super Special)
20. Suddenly Last Summer
21. Reunion (Super Special)
22. Extra Credit
23. Politically Incorrect
24. Topsy-Turvy
25. In It To Win It
