= Raphaël Nadjari =

French-Israeli television writer and director

- רפאל נדג'ארי
- Born: 1971 (age 53–54); Marseille, France
- Occupation(s): Film director, screenwriter
- Years active: 1999–present

Raphaël Nadjari (Hebrew: רפאל נדג'ארי; born 1971) is a French-Israeli writer and director for film and television.

== Career ==
In 1993, Nadjari started working for French television as a writer and director. In 1997, he wrote the television screenplay Le P'tit Bleu, which was directed by Francois Vautier for Arte as part of the TV drama collection Petits Gangsters.

The same year he wrote and directed his first US feature, The Shade (released in 1999), which starred Richard Edson, Lorie Marino, and Jeff Ware. It was an adaptation of A Gentle Creature by Dostoevsky that Nadjari updated, setting it in contemporary New York City. This film was an official selection for Un Certain Regard at the 1999 Cannes Film Festival and also appeared at the Deauville Film Festival; the film was awarded in Bergamo Film Festival (Italy).

At the end of 1999, Nadjari directed his second feature, I Am Josh Polonski's Brother (2001). Starring Richard Edson and Jeff Ware, it was shot on Super 8 mm film in New York. The film opened in Paris on June 6, 2001, and was selected for the Forum for New Cinema at the Berlin International Film Festival in 2001. The same year, Nadjari shot the film Apartment #5c in New York; it was released in 2002. The film starred Richard Edson and Tinkerbell, an Israeli actress, and was selected in Cannes Directors' Fortnight.

In 2004, Nadjari filmed Avanim in Tel Aviv with Asi Levi who has been nominated for Best Actress in the European Film Award. The film received also the Best Film award in Cinéma Tous Ecrans and the Best Director award in the Cannes 2005 France Culture Award, Awards at the Seville Film Festival.

In 2006 Tehilim was set in Jerusalem and stars Michael Moushanov and Limor Goldstein, two prominent figures of Israeli television and theatre; it has been shown at the 2007 Cannes Film Festival in the Official Selection and won the Tokyo Filmex Best Film Award the same year.

In 2009, his documentary A History of Israeli Cinema, a two-episode film of 104 minutes each, telling the story of Israeli Cinema since 1933 until today, was screened at the Berlin film festival forum.

In 2013, A Strange Course of Events, a film set in Haifa was screened in the Directors' Fortnight section at the 2013 Cannes Film Festival.

Nadjari's 2016 film Night Song (Mobile étoile) won the Tobias Spencer Award (in the Between Jewish and Israeli Identity competition) at the Haifa International Film Festival.
