= Elves in fiction =

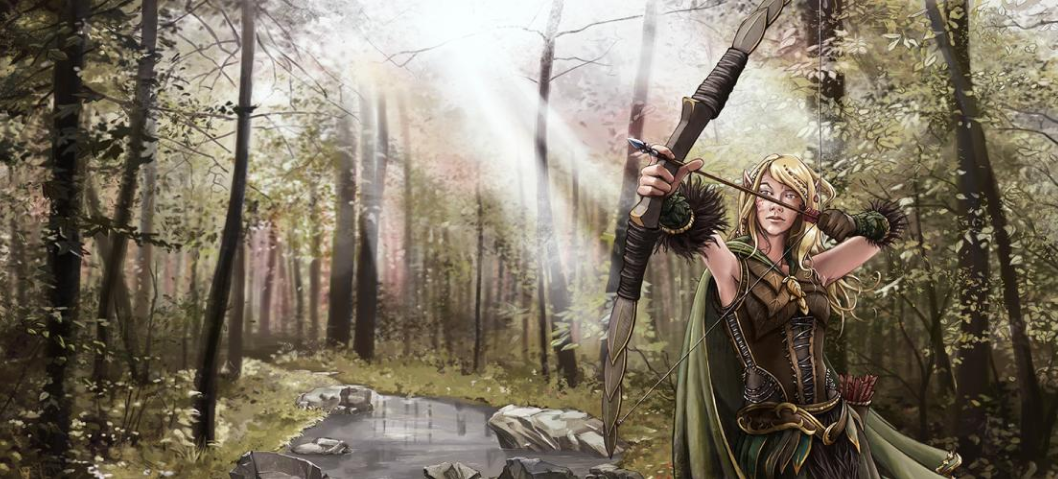
A post-Tolkien interpretation of a fantasy elf, from the Wesnoth fantasy setting, 2011

In many works of modern fantasy, elves are depicted as a race or species of pointy-eared humanoid beings. These depictions arise from the álfar of Norse mythology influencing elves in fantasy as being semi-divine and of human stature, whose key traits are being friendly with nature and animals (Oftentimes being able to communicate with some facet of nature). However, this differs from Norse and the traditional elves found in Middle Ages folklore and Victorian era literature.

Post-Tolkien fantasy elves tend to be immortal or long-lived in comparison to humans, more beautiful and wiser, with sharper senses and perceptions, and abilities or crafts that seem alien or magical. They may be from an age long before other races appeared or were created. Consequently, Elves often serve as living relics of a setting's fictional mythology and the source of its lore.

== In modern fantasy literature ==
=== Lord Dunsany ===
The elves of modern fantasy first appeared in Lord Dunsany's 1924 novel The King of Elfland's Daughter, with Norse-style elves.

=== Tolkien ===
In Tolkien's legendarium, Elves have a pregnancy that lasts about a year. By the age of 1, Elves can speak, walk and dance. Puberty and full height are attained at around their fiftieth to one hundredth year, when they stop aging physically. Elves marry freely, monogamously, only once, and for love early in life; adultery is unthinkable. Betrothal, with the exchange of rings, lasts at least a year, and is revocable by the return of the rings, but is rarely broken. Marriage is by words exchanged by the bride and groom (including the speaking of the name of Eru Ilúvatar) and consummation; it is celebrated with a feast. Wedding rings are worn on the index fingers. The bride's mother gives the groom a jewel to wear. Elves view the sexual act as special and intimate, for it leads to the birth of children. Elves who are married cannot be forced by other Elves to have sex; before that they will lose the will to endure and go to Mandos. Elves have few children, and there are long intervals between each child. They are soon preoccupied with other pleasures; their libido wanes and they focus their interests elsewhere, like the arts.

Elves, particularly the Noldor, spend their time on smithwork, sculpture, music and other arts, and on preparing food. Males and females are equal. Elves are skilful horse-riders, riding without saddle or bridle, though Tolkien was inconsistent on this point.

The archer Legolas Greenleaf, here portrayed by Orlando Bloom in Peter Jackson's film adaptation of The Lord of the Rings, is the archetypal elf in that story.

Tolkien created many languages for his Elves. His interest was primarily philological, and he said his stories grew out of his languages. Indeed, the languages were the first thing Tolkien ever created for his mythos, starting with what he originally called "Elfin" or "Qenya" [sic]. This was later spelled Quenya (High-elven); it and Sindarin (Grey-elven) are the most complete of Tolkien's constructed languages. Elves are also credited with creating the Tengwar (by Fëanor) and Cirth (Daeron) scripts.

Tolkien's Elves are immortal, and remain unwearied with age, but can be killed in battle. Spirits of dead Elves go to the Halls of Mandos in Valinor. After a period of cleansing, their spirits are again clothed in bodies. (Note: Tolkien 1993, The Converse of Manwë and Eru, pp. 361–364) Elves eventually grow weary of Middle-earth and desire to go to Valinor; they often sail from the Grey Havens, where Círdan the Shipwright dwells with his folk. (Note: Tolkien, J. R. R. (1977). Christopher Tolkien (ed.). The Silmarillion. Boston: Houghton Mifflin. ISBN 978-0-395-25730-2., ch. 20 "Of the Fifth Battle: Nirnaeth Arnoediad".) Eventually, their immortal spirits overwhelm and consume their bodies, rendering them "bodiless", whether they opt to go to Valinor or not. At the end of the world, all Elves will have become invisible to mortal eyes, except to those to whom they wish to manifest themselves.

=== Other authors ===
Tolkien's The Lord of the Rings (1954–1955) became extremely popular and was extensively imitated. His elves have formed the view of elves in modern fantasy like no other singular source. In the 1960s and afterwards, elves similar to those in Tolkien's novels became staple, non-human characters, in high fantasy works and in fantasy role-playing games.

Tolkien's elves were followed by Poul Anderson's grim Norse-style elves of human size, in his 1954 fantasy The Broken Sword.

Guy Gavriel Kay's Fionavar Tapestry series, starting with his 1984 fantasy The Summer Tree, includes both lios alfar (light elves) and swart alfar (dark elves), using variations on the original Norse or Icelandic terms. They play parts corresponding, respectively, to Tolkien's elves and to his goblins (different from orcs).

Philip Mazza's 2014 fantasy The Harrow takes a different approach, in a post-apocalyptic fantasy world. Elves are of the En' Edan in the old tongue, or of the races of man and similar origins, those of the good and righteous. In Mazza's first book, The Harrow: From Under a Tree, the first appearance of elves is described as follows: "Dressed in pure white and with long black hair was a fair-skinned elf, the Elf-King to be exact, and his name was Dalgaes. Faithfully by the Elf-King's side was the archer Tinnfierl, a slim elf with auburn hair, wearing a mixture of tan leather and green cloth, and with bow and arrow strapped to his back." For Mazza, there are many of the En' Edan, to include the elves or En' Edhel, the race of dwarfs or the En' Naug, and those of man who reside in the northern wastelands of the Crag or the Mur' Edan.

In Luc Besson's 2002–2005 Arthur book series and the 2006 animated trilogy Arthur and the Minimoys based on it, there is a race of elves with African descent called the Minimoys (in the American version, "Invisibles"), who are extremely tiny, 2 mm tall, and it is difficult to see them with the naked eye. They have the usual pointy ears and big eyes, and can be thousands of years old. A thousand Minimoy years is equivalent to ten human years. Their world is a mix of modern and medieval era. It is possible for humans to turn into Minimoys through a special ritual.

== In games ==
=== Dungeons & Dragons ===
Elves are a humanoid race in the Dungeons & Dragons fantasy role-playing game, one of the primary races available for player characters, and play a central role in the narratives of many setting worlds of the game. Elves are renowned for their grace and mastery of magic and weapons such as the bow and sword. Becoming physically mature by the age of 25 and emotionally mature at around 125, they are also long-lived, capable of living more than half a millennium and remaining physically youthful. Possessed of innate beauty and grace, they are viewed as both wondrous and haughty by other races; however, their natural detachment is seen by some as introversion or xenophobia. They were usually antagonistic towards dwarves.

There are numerous different subraces and subcultures of elves, including aquatic elves, dark elves (drow), deep elves (rockseer), grey elves, high elves, moon elves, snow elves, sun elves, valley elves, wild elves (grugach), wood elves and winged elves (avariel). The offspring of humans and elves are known as "half-elves" among humans, and as "half-humans" among elves.

=== Generic Universal RolePlaying System ===
The Generic Universal RolePlaying System (GURPS) Fourth Edition deals with a wide variety of types of Elves. Discworld Roleplaying Game (which uses the GURPS system) describes the Elves of the Discworld series in addition to the Typical Elf, Royal Elf, and Elf-Kin. GURPS Basic Set: Characters, GURPS Banestorm, GURPS Fantasy, and Dungeon Fantasy Adventurers, part of the Dungeon Fantasy Roleplaying Game (which uses GURPS rules), each have a different template for the "standard" Elf. Other variations in those books and in GURPS Dungeon Fantasy 3: The Next Level include the Dark Elf, Half-Elf (two versions), High Elf, Mountain Elf, Sea Elf (two versions), Shadow Elf, Winged Elf, and Wood Elf. GURPS Fantasy Folk: Elves includes the templates for all previous Fourth Edition books and also includes templates for Deep Elf, Eldritch Elf, and Sky Elf. Third Edition supplements with different variations include GURPS Fantasy (for Third Edition) and GURPS Fantasy Folk.

=== Warhammer franchise ===
In the Warhammer franchise, the first civilized people of the world were the High Elves (Asur) from the Atlantis-like (though unsunken) island realm of Ulthuan. Early on, the High Elves colonized large parts of the Warhammer world, but following the rise of the Druchii (called "Dark Elves" by others than themselves), a fascistoid movement of corsairs and slavers, the High Elves were plunged into civil war and their power greatly faded. Their civil war was followed decades later by a costly war with the Dwarfs, which saw the Elves expelled from many of their colonies, reducing their civilisation to only Ulthuan. Many of the elves who were expelled from their former colonies took up residence in the deep forests of the Old World, and with time became known as Wood Elves (Asrai). The three kindreds of elves in Warhammer are not separate species but rather separate national groups which epitomise the moral and emotional extremes of the powerful elven psyche – The High Elves are elves at their most noble, morally upright and fair, the Dark elves are elves at their most cruel, vicious and debased. The Wood Elves combine aspects of both in their behaviour, seeming fickle, capricious and dangerously inconstant to outsiders. Unlike Tolkien's elves, those of the Warhammer world are not known to interbreed with humans – a consistent feature of their design in recent years being a concern to differentiate them as much as possible from humans, who they might otherwise begin to resemble too closely. Further, while they may bear physical similarity to the works of Tolkien, GW writers have stated that their elves were based on the works of the American science fiction author Poul Anderson.

Warhammer is unique in the aspect that Warhammer 40,000, the science fantasy version of the game, features space faring elves under the name of Aeldari (previously called Eldar, a term borrowed from Tolkien) – an ancient race that once served the Old Ones and in the aftermath of a great catastrophe have split into four distinct groups, the Craftworld Aeldari, the rustic Aeldari Exodites (dinosaur riding eldar in self-imposed exile) the mysterious and acrobatic Harlequins and the fallen kindred, the Drukhari.

=== Warcraft franchise ===
Azeroth, a high fantasy world of the Warcraft franchise created by Blizzard Entertainment, originally featured high elves who are similar to elf archetypes found in other high fantasy video games. The series introduced the naturalistic violet-skinned night elves in the 2002 real-time strategy video game Warcraft III. Within series lore, the night elves are among the oldest known races in Azeroth and are descended from a tribe of the now extinct dark trolls; in turn, other subraces of elves are descended from the night elves. Despite starting off as practitioners of arcane magic, they eventually abandon its use and focus on the powers afforded to them over nature. The high elves, who split from the night elves in the distant past, face the destruction of their kingdom, Quel'Thalas, and its capital, Silvermoon, at the hands of the undead Scourge. The survivors are thereafter known as blood elves and, due to the destruction of the magically powerful Sunwell, become aware of their magical addiction. This faction was at one point part of the alliance alongside the humans, but abandoned the alliance following the events of Warcraft III.

Two new playable factions of elves were introduced during the events of World of Warcraft: Legion, an expansion to the massively multiplayer online role-playing game World of Warcraft: the nightborne and the void elves. Nightborne are a night elf subrace with an affinity for arcane magic, while the void elves are blood elves or high elves who have embraced the power of the metaphysical realm known as the Void. In 2026, Blizzard announced the skyborne as a new playable elven race for World of Warcraft: Forever, with players able to choose between the Horde and Alliance factions.

Several elf characters from the Warcraft universe are represented in the crossover multiplayer online battle arena game Heroes of the Storm. Tyrande Whisperwind,, Kael'thas Sunstrider, Sylvanas Windrunner and Illidan Stormrage are examples of playable elf heroes in the game. Numerous cards with the card art depicting night elves and blood elves are present in digital collectible card game Hearthstone.

=== The Elder Scrolls universe ===
The universe of The Elder Scrolls video games features distinct races of elves (or Mer as they refer to themselves, while humans are conversely referred to as Men) including High Elves (Altmer), Dark Elves (Dunmer, formerly the Chimer or Velothi) and their offshoot the Cantemiric Velothi, Wood Elves (Bosmer), Wild Elves (Ayleid), Snow Elves (Falmer), Sea Elves (Maormer), and the ancestors of all elves, the Aldmer. Within The Elder Scrolls universe, both the "Dwarves" (Dwemer, who are not actually of short stature) and the Orcs (Orsimer) are elven-derived races. One of the human races in The Elder Scrolls universe known as the Bretons are also of elven ancestry. This is said to account for their natural affinity towards the magical arts.

=== Heroes of Might and Magic series ===
In the Heroes of Might and Magic series, Elves are divided into two sub-species: Wood Elves, and Snow Elves. Wood Elves are from the wooded kingdom of AvLee which lies in eastern Antagarich. They are descendants and cousins of the Vori elves. Snow Elves a.k.a. Vori Elves or "true elves", are from the icy isle of Vori, which lies north of the continent of Antagarich in Heroes of Might and Magic 3 and its expansions.

=== RuneScape ===
RuneScape features elves as a race in the game's fictional world of Gielinor. They dwell to the west in the land of Tirannwn. Elves once inhabited much of the Kingdom of Kandarin under Queen Glarial and King Baxtorian, but following the death of Glarial and the disappearance of Baxtorian, retreated west over the mountains, and their continued presence in the world has passed out of the common knowledge of most other races. Some elves mistrust humans, dwarves, gnomes and trolls, and humans may not enter their capital city of Prifddinas. The elves follow the goddess Seren, who led them to Gielinor through the 'World Gate' during the First Age. One elf dwells within the Champions' Guild as the elven champion, while a number of elves serve in the Army Recruitment and Mobilisation Society as formidable wielders of magic. The 'dark elves' of the Iorwerth clan have taken over the elven capital of Prifddinas and turned against the elves to serve a "Dark Lord". Members of the Iorwerth clan are also present in and under the supposedly plague-stricken human city of West Ardougne, disguised as plague doctors. There are also some remaining elves of the other clans, who are now forced to hide as they fight to take back power, and now reside within the hidden lodge of Lletya, as well as within other small camps and areas across Tirannwn.
