= Paul Greenberg =

Paul Greenberg may refer to:

- Paul Greenberg (journalist) (1937–2021), winner of Pulitzer Prize for Editorial Writing
- Paul Greenberg (comedian) (born 1965)
- Paul Greenberg (author) (born 1967), author of "Four Fish"
- Paul Greenberg (executive), Digital Media CEO
- Paul Greenberg (producer), film and commercial producer
