= BUF Compagnie =

French visual effects company

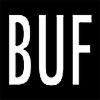
- Type: Privately held company
- Industry: Visual effects, CGI animation
- Founded: 1984
- Headquarters: Paris, France
- Key people: Pierre Buffin
- Number of employees: 150
- Website: buf.com

BUF Compagnie is a French visual effects company, specializing in CGI for feature films, commercials, and music videos.

== History ==
BUF was founded by Pierre Buffin in 1984. The company originates from Paris, France and has since expanded to Montreal, Canada and Los Angeles, California.

== Technology ==
BUF is credited with launching the 'bullet time' effect created for The Matrix franchise, which was directly inspired by the research carried out by BUF while working on Michel Gondry's "Like A Rolling Stone" music video in 1996.

== Films ==
This is a list of films in which BUF provided VFX work.

- The City of Lost Children (1994)
- Batman & Robin (1997)
- Fight Club (1999)
- The Cell (2000)
- Panic Room (2002)
- S1m0ne (2002)
- The Matrix Reloaded (2003)
- The Matrix Revolutions (2003)
- Van Helsing (2004)
- Finding Neverland (2004)
- 2046 (2004)
- Alexander (2004)
- Batman Begins (2005)
- Angel-A (2005)
- Revolver (2005)
- Three Burials of Melquiades Estrada (2005)
- Once Upon a Time in the Oued (2005)
- Harry Potter and the Goblet of Fire (2005)
- Silent Hill (2006)
- The Prestige (2006)
- United 93 (2006)
- Arthur and the Invisibles (2006)
- Our Earthmen Friends (2007)
- Spider-Man 3 (2007)
- Mr. Magorium's Wonder Emporium (2007)
- Two Worlds (2007)
- Big City (2007)
- Dante 01 (2008)
- Asterix at the Olympic Games (2008)
- Be Kind Rewind (2008)
- Speed Racer (2008)
- The Dark Knight (2008)
- Babylon A.D. (2008)
- City of Ember (2008)
- Ricky (2009)
- Solomon Kane (2009)
- Splice (2009)
- In the Beginning (2009)
- Knowing (2009)
- Enter the Void (2009)
- Arthur and the Vengeance of Maltazard (2009)
- Avatar (2009)
- Arthur 3: The War of the Two Worlds (2010)
- Thor (2011)
- Green Lantern (2011)
- Machine Gun Preacher (2011)
- Dark Shadows (2012)
- Total Recall (2012)
- Life of Pi (2012)
- Omar (TV series) (2012)
- The Blue Elephant (2014)
- Jupiter Ascending (2015)
- Poltergeist (2015)
- Kingsman: The Secret Service (2015)
- Run All Night (2015)
- The Lobster (2015)
- Independence Day: Resurgence (2016)
- X-Men: Apocalypse (2016)
- The Divergent Series: Allegiant (2016)
- Blade Runner 2049 (2017)
- The Dark Tower (2017)
- Kingsman: The Golden Circle (2017)
- 12 Strong (2018)
- The Darkest Minds (2018)
- High Life (2018)
- Beetlejuice Beetlejuice (2024)
