= Cinnabar (disambiguation) =

Cinnabar is the common bright scarlet to brick-red form of mercury(II) sulfide.

Cinnabar may also refer to:

- Cinnabar, Queensland, a locality in the Gympie Region, Queensland, Australia
- Cinnabar moth (Tyria jacobaeae), a brightly coloured arctiid moth
- Cinnabar Theater, a theater in Petaluma, California, United States
- Vermilion, a red pigment made from the mineral
- Cinnabar, a character in the manga and anime Land of the Lustrous
- Dracaena cinnabari, a tree with red sap that was used as a dye
