= In Case of Emergency (TV series) =

US television series

- Jonathan Silverman, Lori Loughlin, and David Arquette
- Genre: Sitcom
- Created by: Howard J. Morris
- Starring: David Arquette; Jonathan Silverman; Greg Germann; Kelly Hu; Nicholas Roget-King; Jackson Bond; Lori Loughlin
- Composers: John O'Brien; Rick Boston
- Country of origin: United States
- Original language: English
- No. of seasons: 1
- No. of episodes: 13 (1 unaired)

Production
- Executive producers: Howard J. Morris; Emile Levisetti; Jon Favreau (Pilot only)
- Producer: Mychelle Deschamps
- Cinematography: Victor Hammer (Pilot only); Dave Perkal
- Editors: Daniel Lebental (Pilot only); Art Kellner; Teresa Lang
- Camera setup: Single-camera
- Running time: 30 minutes
- Production companies: Bushwacker Productions; Howard J. Morris Productions; Touchstone Television

Original release
- Network: ABC
- Release: January 3 – April 11, 2007

In Case of Emergency is an American half-hour sitcom television series shown on ABC in the United States. The series follows a group of high school acquaintances whose lives have not turned out as they hoped. It premiered on January 3, 2007, at 9:30 pm and ended on April 11, 2007. The pilot episode was directed by Jon Favreau and the cast included Jonathan Silverman, David Arquette, Lori Loughlin, Kelly Hu, and Greg Germann.

Although ABC gave early renewal notices to several of its series on March 21, 2007, In Case of Emergency was not one of them.

On April 12, 2007, ABC announced that the show had been officially canceled, leaving one episode unaired, which has since been broadcast internationally.

== Cast and characters ==
=== Series regulars ===
- Jonathan Silverman as Harry Kennison (captain of the debate team), now a frustrated greeting-card writer
- David Arquette as Jason Ventress (voted most likely to succeed), now under investigation for a corporate scandal and volunteering at a hospital
- Greg Germann as Sherman Yablonsky (competitive eating club '84-'87), now a self-obsessed, formerly obese, disgraced diet guru
- Kelly Hu as Kelly Lee (former valedictorian), now working at a Korean massage parlor
- Lori Loughlin as Dr. Joanna Lupone, a doctor with whom Jason falls in love, despite her being engaged
- Jackson Bond as Dylan Kennison, Harry's son, Nicholas Roget-King played the role in the pilot.

=== Recurring characters ===
- Leigh-Allyn Baker as Maureen, Harry's ex-wife
- Natsuko Ohama as Madam, Kelly's boss
- Jane Seymour as Donna Ventress, Jason's mom
- David Norona as Paul, Jason's lawyer and, unbeknownst to him, Joanna's fiancé
- Maree Cheatham as Elizabeth Yablonsky, Sherman's mom
- Sara Erikson as Summer, a stripper who befriends Sherman
- Lee Reherman as Frank, Kelly's cop boyfriend
- George Sharperson as Omar, Sherman's assistant
- Gary 'G. Thang' Johnson as Officer G Thang, Frank's partner

=== Notable guests ===
- David Carradine as Guru Danny, Stephanie Yablonsky's new spiritual leader
- James Hong as Mr. Lee, Kelly's dad
- Jimmy Kimmel as himself
- Leslie Sykes as herself
- Emily Kuroda as Mrs. Tuckman, a friend of Donna's
- Penny Balfour as Moonblossom, a member of Guru Danny's ashram
- Louis Lombardi as Todd, a security guard at the hospital

== Episodes ==
No.	Title	Directed by	Written by	Original release date	Viewers (millions)
1	"Pilot"	Jon Favreau	Howard J. Morris	January 3, 2007	6.32
A series of personal emergencies reunites high school classmates Harry, Jason, Sherman, and Kelly: Harry encounters Kelly at a Korean "happy endings" massage parlor, and the two flee when her cop boyfriend busts in, diet guru Sherman freaks out when his wife leaves him, taking all his possessions, and Jason ends up at the hospital after trying to kill himself. Guest stars: Jimmy Kimmel, Jeff Imada
2	"It's Got to Be the Morning After"	Robert Duncan McNeill	Howard J. Morris	January 10, 2007	5.22
Kelly's cop boyfriend, Frank, catches Harry helping her move her things out of his place. Sherman's staff refuse to help him as his reputation goes down the drain. Jason starts volunteering at the hospital in the hope of seducing Dr. Joanna. Guest stars: Sonya Eddy, John Enos III, Leslie Sykes
3	"Let Go, Let Golf"	Lev L. Spiro	Tracy Poust and Jon Kinnally	January 17, 2007	3.36
Sherman and Harry sneak into the ashram where Sherman's ex-wife is now staying to retrieve her. Kelly reveals that she accidentally killed her husband during a game of golf. Jason tries to convince Dr. Joanna's ailing grandmother to accept medical treatment so Joanna can postpone her wedding. Guest stars: David Carradine, Ellen Albertini Dow, Arabella Field, Greg Cromer, E. E. Bell
4	"Stuck In Amber"	Lev L. Spiro	Bob Kushell	January 24, 2007	2.98
Jason tries to avoid a process server. Harry gets angry with his boss and quits his job. Sherman starts wearing a disguise to avoid hostile former fans. Guest stars: Rose Abdoo, Michael Kostroff, Bonnie Hellman
5	"Denial For A While"	Gil Junger	Howard J. Morris	January 31, 2007	4.43
Harry asks Kelly not to tell Sherman and Jason what she really does. Sherman turns his eating addiction into a shopping addiction until Jason tells him that his investment company has lost all of his money. Dr. Joanna keeps rejecting Jason's advances.
6	"Oh, Henry"	Gil Junger	Jack Kenny	February 28, 2007	4.42
Faced with going to jail, Jason ponders cutting a deal by ratting on his CEO, who also happens to be his Uncle Henry and his mother Donna's favorite brother. He asks Harry to help him convince his mother, but Donna immediately starts flirting with Harry, leading to a deep, passionate kiss. Meanwhile, Kelly takes Sherman to a strip club to help get him over his wife and introduces him to Summer. Guest stars: Sarah Culberson
7	"Forbidden Love"	Paul Lazarus	David Feeney	March 7, 2007	6.06
Jason discovers Donna and Harry's affair, which makes him rethink his love for Joanna. Meanwhile, Sherman has trouble maintaining his diet and Dylan asks Kelly to be his girlfriend. Guest stars: Keone Young, Emily Kuroda
8	"Proof of Love"	Paul Lazarus	Eric Siegel and Eric D. Wasserman	March 14, 2007	4.66
Sherman asks Kelly to help him kidnap his wife from the ashram. Harry and Donna try to make things right with Jason, who realizes he has proof that Dr. Joanna kissed him. Guest stars: Marco Sanchez, Louis Lombardi, Penny Balfour, Laurence Mason
9	"Your Goose is Cooked"	Victor Nelli, Jr.	Jenny Lee	March 21, 2007	5.13
Kelly's traditionalist parents make a surprise visit, causing her to invent a new life for herself, having Harry pretend to be her husband. To Harry's dismay, she then changes her mind, telling her parents Jason is her husband, to which they demand a traditional Korean wedding be celebrated. Guest stars: James Hong, Amy Hill, Nayo K. Wallace
10	"The Good, the Bad and the Mob"	Emile Levisetti	Rosalind Moore	March 28, 2007	4.31
Dylan is being bullied at school, causing Kelly to ask two Korean mobsters to intimidate his tormentor. Meanwhile, Jason finally convinces Dr. Joanna to go have a coffee with him, on the very same day as all his assets get repossessed. Guest stars: Sterling Beaumon, Lamont Johnson, Loren Lester, Garret T. Sato
11	"Happy Endings"	Linda Mendoza	Michael P. Fox and Robyn Adams	April 4, 2007	4.81
Harry, Jason, and Sherman all have a sex dream on the same night. Sherman convinces Harry to go to a spa with him to stop thinking about Kelly, but once there, Sherman immediately finds himself a girlfriend. Joanna gets a pain in her neck whenever she thinks about Jason, so she goes to see Kelly for a massage, not realizing the type of establishment at which she works. Guest stars: Deborah Theaker
12	"Disorder in the Court"	Victor Nelli, Jr.	David Feeney	April 11, 2007	3.77
Harry tries to get his ex-wife and her new boyfriend Mitch to marry as soon as possible so he can stop paying her alimony, but his efforts backfire when Dylan expresses a preference for Mitch over him. Jason is dismayed when he realizes his lawyer Paul is Joanna's fiancé just as Joanna is about to break up with him to be with Jason. Sherman decides to go to rehab to jumpstart his fading fame. Guest stars: Carla Jimenez
13	"The Picture"	N/A	N/A	Unaired in the US	N/A
Harry and Maureen get back together. Joanna discovers a hidden attachment to Jason. Sherman is a celebrity again as his book becomes a number-one bestseller in Japan. Guest stars: Kathryn Joosten, J. P. Manoux, Kelly Perine

== Ratings ==
Seasonal ratings based on average total viewers per episode of In Case of Emergency on ABC:

Viewership and ratings per season of Show
Season	Timeslot (ET)	Episodes	First aired	Last aired	TV season	Viewership rank	Avg. viewers (millions)	Ref.
1	Wednesday 9:30 P.M. EDT	13	January 3, 2007	April 11, 2007	2006-2007	107	4.8	
