= Robert Stanton (actor) =

American actor, director and playwright

- Born: Robert Lloyd Stanton; March 8, 1963 (age 63); San Antonio, Texas, U.S.
- Education: New York University (MFA)
- Occupations: Actor, director, playwright
- Years active: 1985–present

Robert Lloyd Stanton (born March 8, 1963) is an American actor, director, and playwright. His credits include The House on Carroll Street (1988), A League of Their Own (1992), Bob Roberts (1992), Dennis the Menace (1993), The Cosby Mysteries (1994-1995), Don't Drink the Water (1994), Striptease (1996), Washington Square (1997), Red Corner (1997), Frasier (1998), Next Stop Wonderland (1998), Mercury Rising (1998), The Quiet American (2002), Head of State (2003), The Stepford Wives (2004), Find Me Guilty (2006), Confessions of a Shopaholic (2009), Jason Bourne (2016), Ed (2000), Third Watch (2001), Law & Order: Special Victims Unit (2003), Damages (2011), NYC 22 (2012), The Good Wife (2013), and Orange Is the New Black (2013), and Mr. Mercedes (2017-2018).

== Early life ==
Stanton was born on March 8, 1963, in San Antonio, Texas, and raised in Annandale, Virginia, the son of federal workers Billie Loree (née Baker) and Lloyd Winter Stanton, Jr. He was a student at George Mason University in Fairfax, Virginia.

He trained at NYU's Tisch School of the Arts Graduate Acting Program, graduating in 1985.

== Career ==
=== Theater ===
Stanton began his acting career in Joseph Papp's production of the play Measure for Measure at the Delacorte Theater in 1985. He was in the resident company of the American Repertory Theater in Cambridge, Massachusetts, from 1989 to 1991.

Stanton appeared on Broadway in James Graham’s Ink, George Bernard Shaw’s Saint Joan, John Guare's A Free Man of Color, Friedrich Schiller's Mary Stuart, Tom Stoppard's The Coast of Utopia, and Alan Ayckbourn's A Small Family Business. Two-dozen Off Broadway credits include David Lindsay-Abaire's Fuddy Meers, A. R. Gurney's A Cheever Evening, and Caryl Churchill's Owners and Traps. He won an Obie Award, and a Clarence Derwent Award for his performance in David Ives's All in the Timing in 1994. Stanton directed the premiere of Ives's play Don Juan in Chicago Off-Broadway in 1995.

In 2008 and 2009, Stanton appeared in Off-Broadway productions of Love Child, a 22-character farce for two actors, with his co-writer, Daniel H. Jenkins.

In March and April 2012, Stanton appeared in the Eugene O'Neill play Strange Interlude at the Shakespeare Theatre Company, in the role of Charles Marsden; he returned in January 2016 to play Mr. Puff in Jeffrey Hatcher's adaptation of Richard Brinsley Sheridan's The Critic and Moon in Stoppard's The Real Inspector Hound on a double-bill, winning the company's Emery Battis Award for his performances.

=== Film and television roles ===
Stanton made a brief appearance in the thriller The House on Carroll Street (1988). In 1992, he appeared in the films A League of Their Own (1992), and Bob Roberts (1992). The following year, Stanton worked for writer-producer John Hughes, playing Henry Mitchell in Dennis the Menace (1993).

Stanton played John Chapman in the television show The Cosby Mysteries (1994-1995). He appeared in a variety of films, including Don't Drink the Water (1994), Striptease (1996), Washington Square (1997), Red Corner (1997), Next Stop Wonderland (1998), Mercury Rising (1998), The Quiet American (2002), Head of State (2003), The Stepford Wives (2004), Find Me Guilty (2006), Confessions of a Shopaholic (2009), two sequels to Luc Besson's Arthur and the Invisibles, playing Armand Montgomery, father to Freddie Highmore's Arthur, and Jason Bourne (2016).

Stanton appeared in episodes of the television shows Law & Order, Law & Order: Criminal Intent, Law & Order: Special Victims Unit (2003), Frasier (1998), Ed (2000), Third Watch (2001), Damages (2011), NYC 22 (2012), The Good Wife (2013), and Orange Is the New Black (2013).

Stanton also played Anthony “Robi” Frobisher, boss to mass killer in David E. Kelley’s 2017 television adaptation of Stephen King’s novel Mr. Mercedes (2017-2018).

== Filmography ==
=== Film ===
Year	Title	Role	Notes
1988	The House on Carroll Street	Dionysus	
1990	Love or Money	Dudley	
1992	A League of Their Own	Western Union Delivery Man	
1992	Bob Roberts	Bart Macklerooney	
1993	Dennis the Menace	Henry Mitchell	
1996	Striptease	Erb Crandal	
1997	Washington Square	Arthur Townsend	
1997	Hudson River Blues	Jeff	
1997	Red Corner	Ed Pratt	
1998	Next Stop Wonderland	Robert	
1998	Mercury Rising	Dean Crandell	
2000	Happy Accidents	Fetishist	
2002	The Quiet American	Joe Tunney	
2003	Head of State	Advisor	
2004	The Stepford Wives	Ted Van Sant	
2005	Find Me Guilty	Chris Newberger	
2006	The Convention	Good Samaritan	Short film
2008	Gigantic	James Weathersby	
2009	Confessions of a Shopaholic	Derek Smeath	
2009	Arthur and the Revenge of Maltazard	Armand Montgomery	French: Arthur et la vengeance de Maltazard, also known in English as Arthur and the Invisibles 2 or simply Arthur 2 as well as Arthur and the Great Adventure for its UK re-release
2010	Arthur 3: The War of the Two Worlds	Armand Montgomery	French: Arthur et la guerre des deux mondes, also known in English as Arthur and the Invisibles 3 or simply Arthur 3 as well as Arthur and the Great Adventure for its UK re-release
2015	True Story	Jeffrey Gregg	
2016	Jason Bourne	Government Lawyer	

=== Television ===
Year	Title	Role	Notes
1989	Double Exposure: The Story of Margaret Bourke-White	Lloyd-Smith	Television movie
1991	Law & Order	Jed Knox	Episode "The Wages of Love"
1994	Don't Drink the Water	Mr. Burns	Television movie
1994–1995	The Cosby Mysteries	Medical Examiner John Chapman	14 episodes
1995	Central Park West (also known as C.P.W.)	Tom Chasen	2 episodes
1996–1997	Cosby	Mr. Acker	2 episodes
1997	Law & Order	Jacob Sutter	Episode "Harvest"
1998	Frasier	Ben	Episode "The Zoo Story"
2000	Ed	Arthur Daily	Episode "Just Friends"
2001	Third Watch	Donald Simkins	Episode "Duty"
2002	Law & Order: Criminal Intent	Dennis Griscom	Episode "The Third Horseman"
2003	Law & Order: Special Victims Unit	P.B.A. Representative	Episode "Rotten"
2003	Law & Order	Tim Grayson	Episode "Seer"
2003	The Brotherhood of Poland, New Hampshire	Dr. Patz	Episode "Secrets and Lies"
2005	Jonny Zero	Stuart	Episode "Bounty"
2006	Law & Order	Douglas Preston	Episode: "Avatar"
2010	Law & Order: Criminal Intent	Mr. Nower, School Official	Episode: "Three-in-One"
2011	Damages	Pastor Stephen Yates	Episode "Next One's on Me, Blondie"
2012	NYC 22	Steve Cowan	Episode "Jumpers"
2013	The Good Wife	Hugh Saxon	Episode "Going for the Gold"
2013	Orange Is the New Black	Maury Kind	2 episodes
2014	Elementary	Stan Kovacevic	Episode: "The Many Mouths of Aaron Colville"
2014	Alpha House	Van Pingree	Episode: "Gaffergate"
2015	The Blacklist	Verdiant Boss	Episode: "Eli Matchett (No. 72)"
2017–2018	Mr. Mercedes	Anthony "Robi" Frobisher	10 episodes
2021	New Amsterdam	Hank	Episode: "Death Begins in Radiology"
2022	Pretty Little Liars	Marshall Clanton	6 episodes
2022	Blue Bloods	Connor Kelly	Episode: "Homefront"

=== Video games ===
- Bully (2006) - Mr. Galloway
