= Arthur (Besson book series) =

- French cover for a box set containing the 4 novels.
- Arthur et les Minimoys (2002); Arthur et la cité interdite (2003); Arthur et la vengeance de Maltazard (2004); Arthur et la guerre des deux mondes (2005)
- Author: Luc Besson
- Country: France
- Language: French
- Genre: Children; Fantasy
- Publisher: Éditions Intervista
- Published: 2002–2005
- Media type: Print (hardback & paperback); Audiobook; E-book
- No. of books: 4

The Arthur series refers to a series of fantasy novels for children written by Luc Besson, a film director and producer, and published from 2002 to 2005 in France, the United States and the United Kingdom.

This term also refers to the feature films based on them, which Besson wrote, produced and directed. The films were made and released from 2006 to 2010, in France, the UK and the US. The series has also been produced in video game format.

== Novels ==
The four novels were originally published in France by Intervista. Later reissues by Le Livre de Poche have dropped the "Arthur et" part of the titles.

1. Arthur et les Minimoys (2002, literally and in English as "Arthur and the Minimoys")
2. Arthur et la cité interdite (2003, literally and in English as "Arthur and the Forbidden City")
3. Arthur et la vengeance de Maltazard (2004, literally "Arthur and the Revenge of Maltazard")
4. Arthur et la guerre des deux mondes (2005, literally "Arthur and the War of the Two Worlds")

Only the first two books have been published in English (translator: Ellen Sowchek) by HarperCollins in the United States and Faber and Faber in the United Kingdom. These two were reissued in one volume in 2007 by the latter publisher as Arthur and the Invisibles.

== Films ==
Arthur
- Based on: Arthur by Luc Besson
- Produced by: Luc Besson; Emmanuel Prévost (1-3); Stéphane Lecomte (2-3); Fanny Besson (4)
- Production companies: EuropaCorp (1-3); Avalanche Productions (1-3); Apipoulaï Prod (1-3); Canal+ (1-3); TF1 Films Production (2-3); Luc Besson Productions (4); Kinology (4); Cofinova 17 (4)
- Distributed by: EuropaCorp; Apollo Films (4)
- Country: France
- Languages: English (1-3); French (4)
- Budget: Total (3 films): $185 million
- Box office: Total (3 films): $217.2 million

1. Arthur and the Minimoys (2006), based on the two books Arthur et les Minimoys and Arthur et la cité interdite. In the film, 10-year-old Arthur Montgomery enters a magical land, known as the Land of the Minimoys, in a bid to see his grandfather Archibald Suchot, only to be confronted by the Evil M, Maltazard. It was altered as Arthur and the Invisibles for the United States release by The Weinstein Company, but this alteration is now out-of-commerce following the distributing company's closure although is only available on US and UK DVDs.
2. Arthur and the Revenge of Maltazard (2009), based on Arthur et la vengeance de Maltazard. Set two years after the events of The Minimoys, a now 12-year-old Arthur returns to the Minimoys after receiving a distress-call from them. Maltazard later springs loose from the telescope and has now gained human size.
3. Arthur 3: The War of the Two Worlds (2010), based on Arthur et la guerre des deux mondes. In the film, Arthur must find a way to revert to his human size in order to stop the evil forces of Maltazard.
4. Arthur, malédiction (2022) (literally translated to be Arthur, curse), a standalone spin-off psychological horror film.

The second and third installments, which were made back-to-back, have a directly continuous storyline but, in English version only, differ somewhat in the casting of the voice-only roles.

== Video games ==
Video games for the popular consoles of the time have been released alongside the first two films. The Arthur and the Revenge of Maltazard games have been distributed in the United Kingdom and under that name despite the film not being so.

- Arthur and the Invisibles (Microsoft Windows, PlayStation 2, PlayStation Portable)
- Arthur and the Invisibles (Nintendo DS)
- Arthur and the Invisibles (Game Boy Advance)
- Arthur and the Revenge of Maltazard (Microsoft Windows, PlayStation 3, Wii)
- Arthur and the Revenge of Maltazard (Nintendo DS)

== Television series ==
An animated TV series, Arthur and the Minimoys, was produced by Studio 100, and debuted on 17 July 2018. A 20-episode web series was also being planned.

== Other media ==
- Arthur and the Invisibles: Original Motion Picture Soundtrack
- A "4-D film", Arthur: L'Aventure 4D, has been an attraction at Futuroscope.
- In June 2014, the Europa-Park theme park in Rust, Germany was opened as Arthur – The Ride, an inverted-spinning dark ride based on the Arthur movies and characters. The ride includes audio-animatronics and projected footage from the films. The ride's cost was €25 million.
