= Feature Presentation (disambiguation) =

Feature presentation refers to the main film in a theatrical movie.

Feature Presentation or Feature presentation may also refer to:

- Our Feature Presentation, a 2008 independent comedy film
- Feature Presentation (album), an album by Katt Calhoun
- "Feature Presentation", a 2025 track by Toby Fox from Deltarune Chapters 3+4 OST from the video game Deltarune
