= Penny Balfour =

American actress

Penny Balfour is a film, stage and television actress, originally from Honolulu, Hawaii. She is a member of the Actors' Equity Association, and was a student of the School of American Ballet.

In 2015, the cast of Picasso at the Lapin Agile, performed at the Long Wharf Theatre, tied for Best Ensemble for the 2015 Connecticut Critics Circle Awards. Balfour played the role of Germaine.

She starred in the American premiere of Hidden Laughter produced at the Hartford Stage in 1992, the 2023 world premiere of Twisted at the Theater for the New City, and in the 2026 world premiere of Lines at the Theatre 154.

== Performances ==
Selected filmography
Year	Title	Role	Ref.
1999	Flawless	Cristal	
2000	Drop Back Ten	Amanda Bennett	
2001	Sidewalks of New York	young hooker	
2002	Ash Wednesday	Callie	
2006	Arthur and the Invisibles	Rosetta 'Rose' Suchot Montgomery	
2007	Just Add Water	Charlene	
2009	Arthur and the Revenge of Maltazard	Rosetta 'Rose' Suchot Montgomery	
2010	Arthur 3: The War of the Two Worlds	Rosetta 'Rose' Suchot Montgomery	
2011	The Resident	drug addict	

Selected stage appearances
Year	Play	Theatre	Director	Role	Notes	Ref.
1992	Hidden Laughter	Hartford Stage	Mark Lamos	Natalie Pertwee	American Premiere	
1994	Full Moon	American Conservatory Theater		Kerney Bascomb		
1995	Have You Spoken to Any Jews Lately?	The American Jewish Theatre	Michael Rudman	Margaret; German cabaret performer; Tennis player		
1996	The Nina Variations	Contemporary American Theatre Festival	Jef Vowell	Nina	First Production	
1997	Kitty the Waitress	John Drew Theatre	Elizabeth Gottlieb	Kitty		
1997	Misalliance	Pioneer Theatre Company	Charles Morey	Hypatia		
1997	Naomi in the Living Room	John Drew Theatre	Elizabeth Gottlieb	Johnna		
1999	The Stumbling Tongue: "Slippers and Eggs"	Off-Broadway's Public Theatre	Craig Carlisle	Mabel		
1999	Who's Afraid of Virginia Woolf?	Pittsburgh Public Theater	Ted Pappas	Honey		
2014	Picasso at the Lapin Agile	Long Wharf Theatre	Gordon Edelstein	Germaine		
2023	Twisted	Theater for the New City	Joe John Battista		World Premiere	
2026	Lines	Theatre 154	Bellamy Brewster	Julia	World Premiere	

Selected TV appearances
Year	Title	Episode	Role	Ref.
1991	Murphy Brown	S3 E25: "Q&A on FYI"	Alexis Dewar	
1998	Law & Order	S9 E4: "Flight"	Roni	
2000	Ed	S1 E9: "Your Life Is Now"	waitress	
2001	Law & Order	S11 E9: "Hubris"	Carol Gibbons	
2001	Law & Order: Criminal Intent	S1 E9: "The Good Doctor"	Lisa Voight	
2003	The Division	S3 E6: "Cold Comfort"	Mrs. Jenkins	
2004	Malcolm in the Middle	S5 E8: "Block Party"	Margie	
2004	NYPD Blue	S11 E18: "The Brothers Grim"	Alyssa Huber	
2005	Blind Justice	E7: "Leap of Faith"	Victoria Purdy	
2006	24	S5 E11: "Day 5: 5:00 p.m. – 6:00 p.m."	Jenny McGill	
2006	24	S5 E11: "Day 5: 6:00 p.m. – 7:00 p.m."	Jenny McGill	
2006	My Name Is Earl	S2 E10: "South of the Border"	flight attendant	
2006	Without a Trace	S5 E3: "911"	Sue Young	
2007	In Case of Emergency	E7: "Forbidden Love"	Moonblossom	
2007	In Case of Emergency	E8: "Proof of Love"	Moonblossom	
