= St. Joseph High School (Lakewood, California) =

Saint Joseph High School

Location
- 5825 North Woodruff Avenue; Lakewood, California 90713; United States; 33°51′38″N 118°7′4″W

Information
- Type: Private, All-Female
- Motto: Love, Hope and Zeal
- Religious affiliation: Roman Catholic
- Patron saint: St. Joseph
- Established: September 14, 1964; 61 years ago
- Founder: Sisters of St. Joseph of Carondelet
- Sister school: St. John Bosco High School
- Oversight: Sisters of St. Joseph of Carondelet & Archdiocese of Los Angeles
- Principal: Terri Mendoza
- Chaplain: Salesians of Don Bosco
- Grades: 9-12
- Enrollment: 615 (2014-2015)
- Student to teacher ratio: 22:1
- Colors: Orange and white
- Mascot: Jester
- Nickname: SJ, Joseph's, St. Joe's, SJ
- Team name: Jesters
- Accreditation: Western Association of Schools and Colleges
- Newspaper: SJ Press
- Tuition: Regular rate $9,966.00; Active parish-eegistered Catholics eate $9,317 (2015-2016)
- Website: www.sj-jester.org

Saint Joseph High School is a private Catholic all-girls high school located in Lakewood, California. It is located in the Roman Catholic Archdiocese of Los Angeles and sponsored by the Sisters of St. Joseph of Carondelet. Its brother school is St. John Bosco High School.

== History ==
The high school was founded by the Sisters of St. Joseph of Carondelet (CSJ). It opened its doors on September 14, 1964, and was dedicated on May 5, 1967, by Cardinal James McIntyre who had asked the CSJ to open a school for girls in Lakewood. Since its founding, the school has graduated over 4,200 students. Class colors are green, blue, red, and yellow.

== Recognitions and accreditations ==
Saint Joseph is a National Blue Ribbon School and is accredited by the Western Association of Schools and colleges (WASC) and the Western Catholic Education Association (WCEA).

Admissions to Saint Joseph is based on entrance examination, activities, arts and athletics. The admissions process is competitive. The school primarily accepts girls who are college bound. Admission decisions are based on interview of parents and (separately) the student; letters of recommendation from teachers; participation in activities, community service, arts and/or athletics; grades from elementary school, and entrance test scores.

== Notable alumnae ==
- Savannah DeMelo - professional soccer player for Racing Louisville FC
- Ava DuVernay - film director
- Lisa Fernandez - member of the United States Women Olympic Softball Team (1996, 2000, and 2004), associate head coach at UCLA
- Leslie Sykes - morning weekday co-anchor of the "Eyewitness News" at KABC-TV in Los Angeles.
