= Pointy ears =

Physical characteristic

An anime-style elven archer with pointed ears

Pointy ears or pointed ears (also satyr, pixie, goblin, elf(in), or gnome ears) are a characteristic feature of various imaginary creatures. Such ears are a common characteristic of many humanoids in the fantasy genre and can be used as a visual cue indicating that a fictional character is not human (a trope of "otherness").

== In folklore ==
This anatomical feature has been present in various mythological hybrid creatures, like satyrs.

Pointy ears have been a characteristic of many creatures in folklore, such as the French croquemitaine, the Brazilian curupira, the Irish Leprechaun, and the Japanese earth spider. The trait is visible in artworks dating back at least to the times of Ancient Greece and medieval Europe.

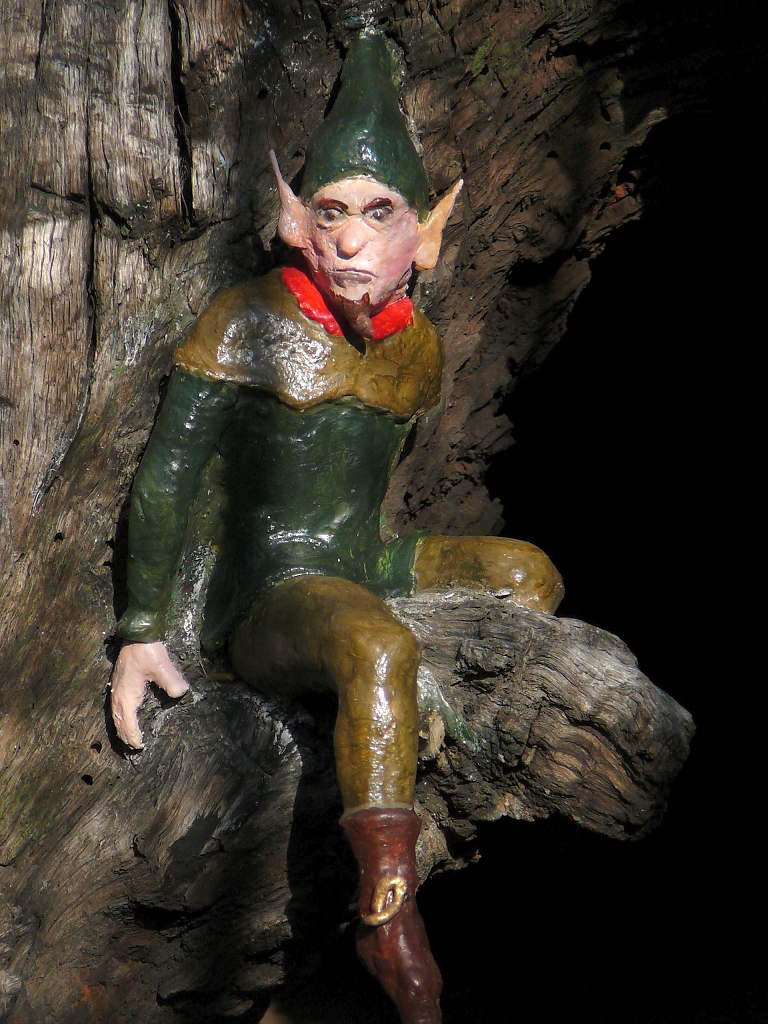
Gnome figure, with pointed ears, part of the Elfin Oak (London)

== In fiction ==
Pointy ears are a common characteristic of many creatures in the fantasy genre such as elves, faeries, gnomes, pixies, hobbits, goblins and orcs, among others. They are also a characteristic of creatures from the horror genre, such as vampires or werewolves.

Pointy ears have become associated with elves in Victorian literature of the 19th century. Popularization of the pointy ears as an attribute of Elves has been attributed to the big screen interpretation of the works of J. R. R. Tolkien. However, the status of elvish ears as canon is not universally accepted by the Tolkien fandom.

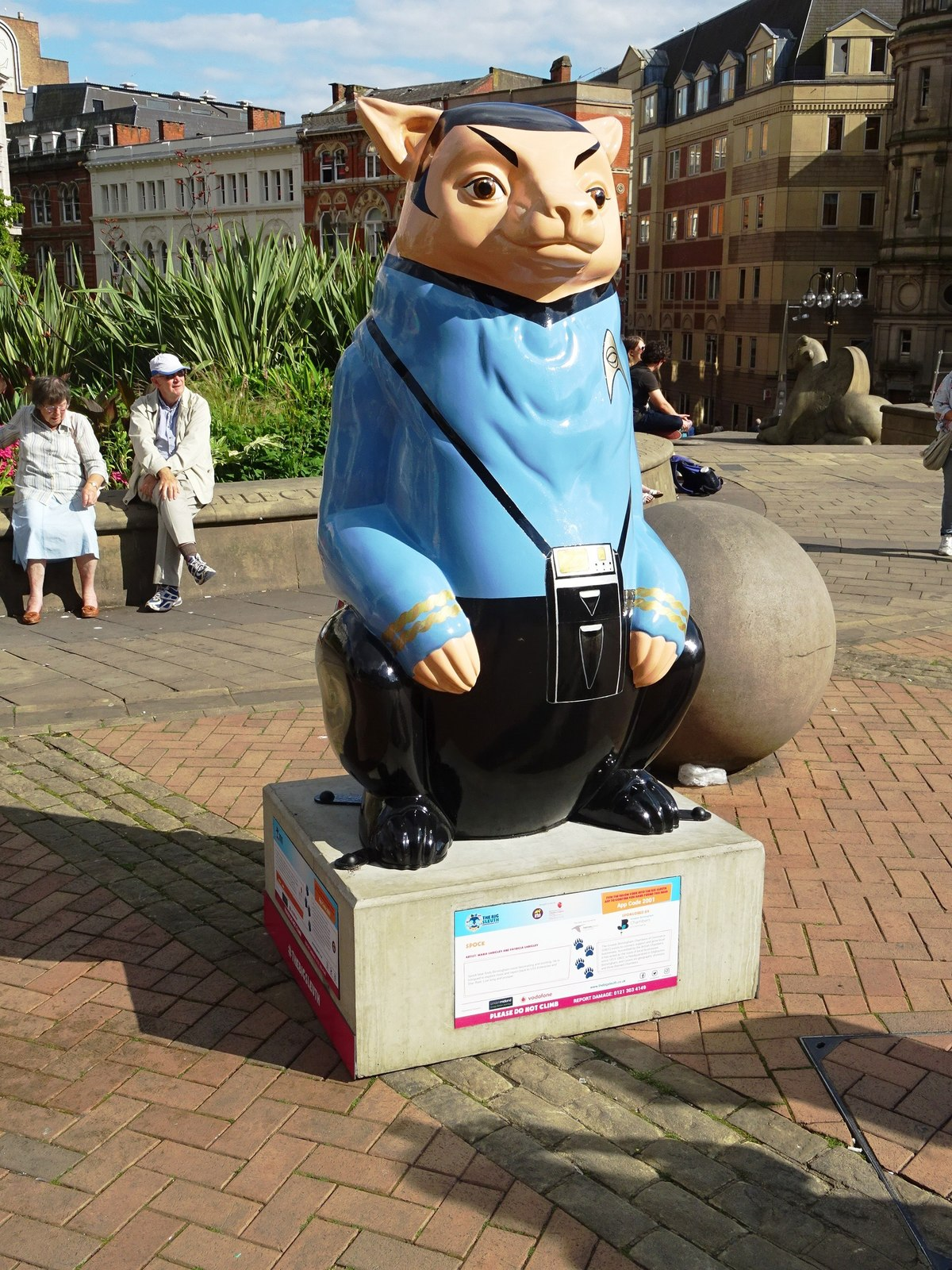
Statue of a "Spock" bear, with pointy ears, in the center of Birmingham (2017)

This type of ears are often found in humanoids, such as among the Vulcan and Romulan races of the Star Trek universe, or the Nightcrawler character from the X-Men universe. The Hylian and Gerudo races in the The Legend of Zelda universe have pointed ears always and sometimes respectively.

This characteristic has been adopted into the Japanese anime and manga art style, where pointy ears are also a common trope of fantasy characters. Manga and anime elves in particular are distinguished by very prominently displayed pointed ears, often drawn larger, more angled, and generally more distinct than in the Western works.

The pointed ears of the alien Mr. Spock from Star Trek have been since called "iconic", having inspired many imitations, while the original prop is preserved as an exhibit in the National Air and Space Museum since 2021. The curator of the museum recalled that, before the show started airing, the production team feared that spectators might perceive "Spock’s appearance — specifically his pointed ears — as devilish, leading some early NBC publicity photos to round off Spock’s ear". The ears were on display at the National Museum of American History in Washington in 2015.

Pointy ears have been described as a simple and cheap visual cue indicating that a fictional character is not human (a trope of "otherness").

== Props and plastic surgery ==
As part of a trend in the 2020s, Boris Johnson, author Holly Black, and others have worn latex pointy ears in the style of an elf in public. while some people have modified their ears surgically to make them pointed. In 2026, the Wall Street Journal noted that "elf ears" was the most "coveted enhancement" in Asia; the trend was particularly notable in China and Korea. The same year, The Star reported one case in which the operation had been associated with health complications. Majority of people undergoing the surgery are women who like the perception that such ears make their face look smaller. Concerns have been raised about the procedure, as in many places it has not yet accredited by mainstream health bodies, and it is considered relatively new and experimental, with unknown long term health effects.

== See also ==
- Elves in fantasy fiction and games
- Fantasy tropes and conventions
- Donohue syndrome
