= Just Add Water (film) =

- Promotional poster
- Directed by: Hart Bochner
- Written by: Hart Bochner
- Produced by: Clifford Werber; Robin Bissell; Brook Stefan
- Starring: Dylan Walsh; Tracy Middendorf; Danny DeVito; Penny Balfour; Justin Long; Anika Noni Rose; Jonah Hill; Pablo Gateza; Nebsile Adda; Petros Peter; David Athiswill; Yonas Tadese; Brad Hunt
- Cinematography: Aaron Barnes
- Edited by: Alan Cody; James Renfroe
- Music by: John Swihart
- Release date: June 17, 2008
- Running time: 95 minutes
- Country: United States
- Language: English

Just Add Water is a 2008 American romantic comedy film written and directed by Hart Bochner. The film stars Dylan Walsh as a hardworking man living in the same small town in which he was born and grew up, Danny DeVito as a gas station owner, and Justin Long as a meth dealer.

== Plot ==
This film is an offbeat romantic comedy about Ray Tuckby, a decent guy with a dead-end life in town of Trona, California, which has been all but a ghost town since the local water supply was diverted to Los Angeles. After discovering that his wife has had an affair with his brother Mark and that his son Eddie is actually Mark's son, he decides to start his life all over again.

Ray's mother and sister die after they fight over his mother's secret lemon meringue pie recipe. After their funeral, his mother's lawyer gives Ray his share of his mother's legacy, including the recipe. He gives the legacy to Eddie for his college expenses, but Eddie says he is working for the local teenage meth baron, Dirk.

After Ray meets and takes encouragement from Merl, a new Chevron gas station operator, Ray begins to dream again.

Ray musters the nerve to pursue his childhood love, Nora, and after Dirk shuts down the town's electricity and water supplies, Ray and his neighbors finally plot to take back his community by toppling Dirk. Upon their success, rain pours from the sky, refilling the local lake and righting the local ecology.

Ray marries Nora and opens a restaurant with her, using his mother's lemon meringue pie as the signature dish. Eddie works as his chef while Spoonie, Denny and his wife work as waiters. Everything works towards a happy ending, with Nora also shown to be expecting a baby.

== Cast ==
- Dylan Walsh as Ray Tuckby
- Tracy Middendorf as Nora
- Danny DeVito as Merl Stryker
- Penny Balfour as Charlene
- Will Rothhaar as Dirk
- Justin Long as Spoonie
- Melissa McCarthy as Selma
- Anika Noni Rose as R'ch'lle
- Jonah Hill as Eddie Tuckby
- June Squibb as Mother
- Brad Hunt as Denny
- Lindsey Axelsson as Chrisy
- Chelsea Field as Jeanne
- Cerina Vincent as The Mrs.
- Tracey Walter as Clem
- Jenifer Boisvert as Nurse
- Emily Arlook as Candy
- Brook Stefan as Thomas Jackson
- Michael Hitchcock as Mark Tuckby
