= Angels with Angles =

- Directed by: Scott Edmund Lane
- Written by: Scott Edmund Lane; Mark Pietri
- Produced by: Paul Greenberg; Scott Edmund Lane; Melissa Wegman
- Starring: Rodney Dangerfield; Frank Gorshin; Branscombe Richmond; Soupy Sales; Adam West; Frank Stallone; David Proval
- Cinematography: Holly Fink
- Edited by: Jamie Mitchell; Steven Vosburgh
- Music by: Tim Kobza; Scott Edmund Lane
- Production company: Sierra Mar Pictures
- Distributed by: InVision Entertainment
- Release date: December 16, 2005
- Running time: 87 minutes
- Country: United States
- Language: English

Angels with Angles is a 2005 American comedy film directed by and starring Scott Edmund Lane.

== Cast ==
- Julie Carmen as Graciella
- Frank Gorshin as George Burns / Shelleen
- Rodney Dangerfield as God
- Scott Edmund Lane as Shoomie
- David Proval as Howie Gold
- Branscombe Richmond as El Capitan
- Henry Darrow as Raul
- Adam West as Alfred the Butler
- Jerry Mathers as Tobacconist #1
- Soupy Sales as Tobacconist #2
- Richard Moll as Robert the Bartender
- Frank Stallone as Elvis Presley
- Zelda Rubinstein as Zelda, God's Assistant
- Carmen Argenziano as Rico
- Jeffrey Weissman as Groucho

== Reception ==
The film has a 0% rating on Rotten Tomatoes from five critics.
