= The Boat Builder =

- Film poster
- Directed by: Arnold Grossman
- Written by: Arnold Grossman
- Based on: The Boat Builder by Arnold Grossman
- Produced by: Richard J. Bosner
- Starring: Christopher Lloyd
- Cinematography: Phillip Briggs
- Edited by: Robert Schafer
- Music by: Giona Ostinelli
- Production companies: Blue Creek Pictures; Reunion Films
- Release date: November 6, 2015 (Fort Lauderdale)
- Running time: 88 minutes
- Country: United States
- Language: English

The Boat Builder is a 2015 American independent drama film directed by Arnold Grossman and starring Christopher Lloyd and Jane Kaczmarek. It is Grossman's directorial debut. It is based on a novel by Grossman.

== Premise ==
An embittered old mariner and an unwanted young orphan form an unlikely bond building a boat.

== Plot ==
Abner Green, an unsociable elderly former sea-captain, lives in an old house and trailer by the shores of San Francisco, and is largely shunned and ridiculed by the locals. He is rebuilding an old sailing sloop, with dreams to sail far away from "troublesome" society and be alone. Only his daughter Katherine comes to visit him regularly, and is worried for his well-being. Due to Abner's being deeply embittered by the cancer-caused death of his wife many years earlier, however, he is unwilling to either listen to or accept Katherine's concerns or advice. One day a group of four neighborhood hoodlums on bicycles come by to verbally harass Abner, then leave. A moment later, a frightened young Black boy named Rick shows up and claims that the delinquents were chasing him. Although Abner is none too pleased to see the boy on his property, he tolerates his presence in order to allow him to distance himself from his tormentors, and they share a philosophical conversation; Rick also expresses a wish to help Abner to finish the work on his boat. The following day, Rick and his foster father, Charles, pay a visit to Abner, and the two grownups allow Rick to stay and assist Abner for a while. Abner and Rick further bond emotionally, and Abner is impressed with Rick's mechanical skills as a carpenter's assistant; the previously-stubborn and frowningly-taciturn Abner also begins to soften and open up more to Rick about his feelings and dreams. He also cautions Rick about how an ocean voyage can be both relaxing and terrifying, with the dangers of sinking in a storm, starving to death if one's craft fails to reach land as soon as planned, and so on. Nonetheless, Rick remains enthusiastic about going on a sailing adventure with Abner. That night, however, Rick has a nightmare about a sea-voyage gone wrong, and a worried Charles fears that Rick's mind is being too troubled by Abner's tales, and wants to send Rick to a juvenile psychiatric ward for treatment. Having already once been confined to a home for delinquents in the past --- and received extremely abusive treatment there --- Rick tells Abner that he would rather run away than be sent to such an intolerable place again. Rick is then assaulted by the bicycle-miscreants when he tries to stop them from vandalizing Abner's boat; they spray-paint his face and shirt with the same color paint that they'd used to scrawl the word "crazy" on the boat's keel, causing Abner to think that Rick did the graffiti and other vandalizing himself. Eventually Abner believes Rick's protests of innocence when Rick's foster sister, Ruth, also shows up and reveals a shocking revelation --- her own brother, Donnie, was in cahoots with the four delinquent bicyclists, and she'd overheard Donnie talking to them on the phone about it. Abner and Rick reconcile, and perform more work on the boat together. Unbeknownst to Abner, however, his daughter Katherine has complained to the code-enforcement officer about Abner's boat-building, which turns out to be a violation of local ordinances; Katherine's hopes are that this will force Abner to abandon his life-consuming boat-restoration efforts and be placed in a nursing home where his health and well-being will be looked after. The officer gives Abner two weeks before the boat will be demolished by the city. Abner feels like giving up, but Rick encourages him to try to complete the boat's repairs in the two weeks' grace period, with Rick's help. The two friends buckle down in earnest, and complete the necessary refurbishing and outfitting on the evening before the deadline. On the morning of the scheduled demolition, the bulldozer and city workers show up, along with the press and a number of protesting citizenry in support of Abner. They are surprised to discover, however, that both Abner and his boat are nowhere to be found, having set sail sometime earlier. In the ensuing bewilderment and confusion, nobody seems to notice that Rick has disappeared, also. It is revealed that he had stowed away on Abner's boat in order to assist and be with him, to be discovered by a flabbergasted Abner only when he is far out at sea, past the Farallon Islands. The movie ends with a flustered-but-resigned Abner giving Rick basic instructions on navigation and steering the boat.

== Cast ==
- Christopher Lloyd as Abner Green
- Jane Kaczmarek as Katherine
- David Lascher as Charles
- Jeffrey Weissman as Bud
- Rachel Resheff as Ruth
- Derek Stefan as Officer Grigsby
- Joseph John Schirle as Duffy
- Heather Mathieson as Jean
- Apeksha Pradhan as Insurance Agent
- Tekola Cornetet as Rick

== Production ==
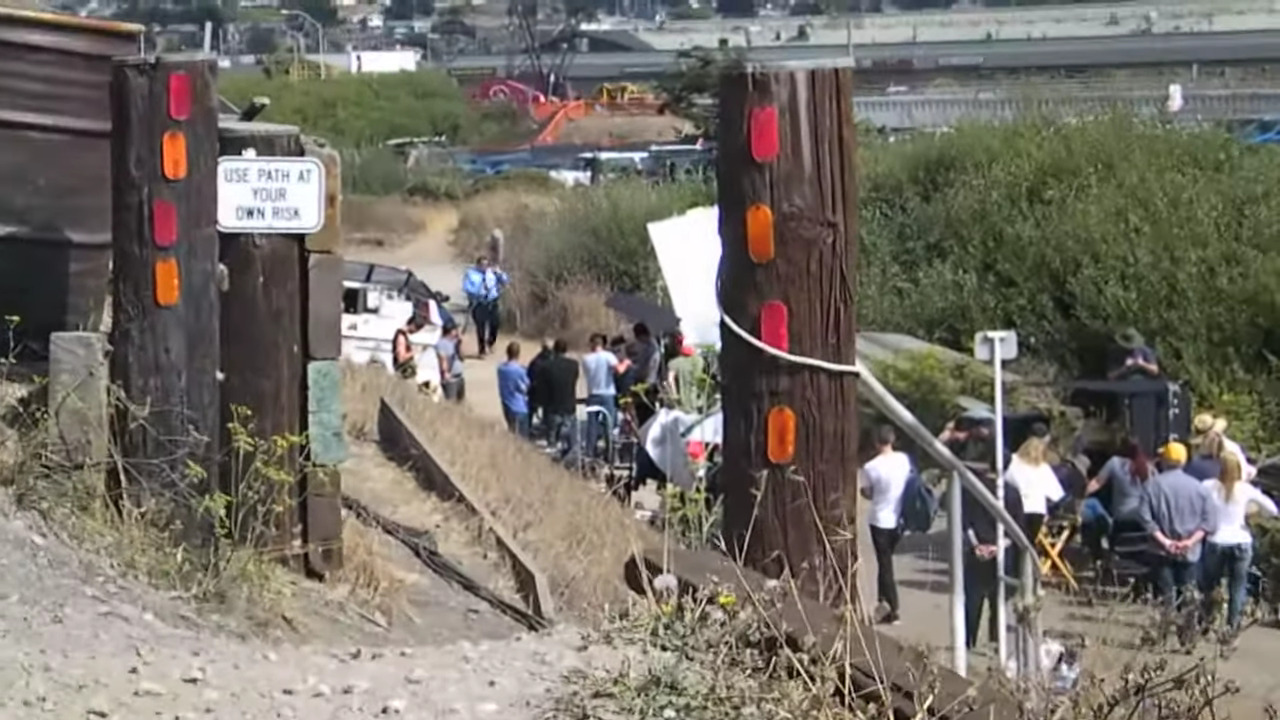
Part of The Boat Builder film set near Pacifica State Beach

Bruce Dern was initially considered for the role of Abner.

The film was shot in the San Francisco Bay Area. The sound recording of the film occurred in Colorado.

== Release ==
The film made its worldwide premiere at the 30th Fort Lauderdale International Film Festival on November 6, 2015.
