= The Cosby Mysteries =

American mystery drama television series

- Genre: Mystery; Drama
- Created by: David Black; William Link
- Directed by: Jerry London
- Starring: Bill Cosby; Robert Stanton; James Naughton; Rita Moreno; Mos Def; Lynn Whitfield
- Composers: Craig Handy; Bill Cosby (as William H. Cosby, Jr.); David Weiss
- Country of origin: United States
- Original language: English
- No. of seasons: 1
- No. of episodes: 19 (18 + pilot)

Production
- Running time: 60 minutes per episode
- Production companies: Sah Enterprises; Columbia Pictures Television; NBC Productions

Original release
- Network: NBC
- Release: January 31, 1994 – April 12, 1995

The Cosby Mysteries is an American mystery drama television series starring Bill Cosby that aired on NBC from September 21, 1994, to April 12, 1995. 19 episodes were made. It was the first television series to star Cosby since The Cosby Show (which ended in the spring of 1992) and lasted just one season (1994–1995). Actor/rapper Yasiin Bey (also known as Mos Def) appeared in several episodes (sometimes credited as Dante Smith).

== Premise ==
Cosby played Guy Hanks, a New York City Police Department criminalist, who retired from the police force after winning $44 million in the lottery.

His peaceful retirement is frequently interrupted by his former colleagues, Detective Adam Sully (James Naughton) and medical examiner John Chapman (Robert Stanton), who ask him to consult on tough cases. As Hanks uses his wits and his forensics knowledge to solve crimes, he deals with his holistic housekeeper Angie Corea (Rita Moreno) and his girlfriend Barbara Lorenz (Lynn Whitfield).

== Production history ==
The show was created by David Black and William Link. Link's previous series included Columbo on NBC and Murder, She Wrote on CBS. Link developed the series at Cosby's request, as Cosby wanted to make an intelligent, character-driven mystery series that did not rely on graphic violence.

The show began on January 31, 1994, as a two hour movie, and 18 regular episodes began airing on NBC on September 21, 1994. The series ranked 62nd for the season with an average 9.9 household rating. Executive producer William Link criticized NBC for not effectively advertising the show before its premiere launch. NBC Entertainment president Warren Littlefield blamed Bill Cosby for not using his personal fame to promote the show.

At the beginning of 1995, prior to the show's cancellation, creators William Link and David Black were dropped from the production team by NBC.

Critics expressed hope that The Cosby Mysteries would fare better than Cosby's previous two ventures, Here and Now and the game show remake, You Bet Your Life. The Cosby Mysteries has been rerun in the United Kingdom, on digital channel ITV1, and in the United States on A&E, STARZ! Mystery and TV One.

The Cosby Mysteries was shot in New York City by SAH Enterprises.

== Cancellation ==
The Cosby Mysteries lasted 19 episodes in one season, and was cancelled permanently in February 1995. On April 12, 1995, The Cosby Mysteries ceased operations for good.

== Cast ==
- Bill Cosby as Guy Hanks
- Rita Moreno as Angie Corea
- Robert Stanton as Medical Examiner John Chapman
- James Naughton as Det. Adam Scully
- Yasiin Bey as Dante Beze
- Lynn Whitfield as Barbara Lorenz

== Episodes ==
No.	Title	Directed by	Written by	Original release date
1	"Pilot"	Jerry London	David Black and William Link	January 31, 1994
NYPD criminalist Guy Hanks retires from the force.
2	"The Lottery Winner Murders"	Jerry London	Story by : David Black & William Link & Ed Zuckerman; Teleplay by : Ed Zuckerman & Edward Tivnan & Alfonse Ruggiero	September 21, 1994
Guy is profoundly shocked when a killer targets lottery winners. Note: This is the first regular episode.
3	"Our Lady of Cement"	Philip Sgriccia	Story by : Robert Van Scoyk; Teleplay by : Alfonse Ruggiero	September 28, 1994
A mummified corpse is found in a refurbished apartment.
4	"Self Defense"	E. W. Swackhamer	Edward Tivnan	October 5, 1994
Sully is accused of murdering a cop.
5	"Only You"	E. W. Swackhamer	Siobhan Byrne	October 12, 1994
A bereaved husband asks Guy to investigate his wife's life.
6	"One Day at a Time"	John Whitesell	Charles Kipps	October 19, 1994
Guy Hanks investigates a recovering substance abuser's claim of innocence for the killing of a district attorney.
7	"Home, Street Home"	Corey Allen	Charles Kipps	October 26, 1994
Guy identifies a homeless woman's body.
8	"The Fine Art of Murder"	Alan J. Levi	Story by : Edward Tivnan & William Link; Teleplay by : Edward Tivnan	November 2, 1994
Simon Jones plays a multimillionaire with Guy acting as his alibi.
9	"Expert Witness"	Corey Allen	Story by : William Link & Edward Tivnan & Nancy Miller; Teleplay by : Charles Kipps & Siobhan Byrne & Nancy Miller	November 16, 1994
An OAP cat burglar is accused of murder.
10	"Mirror, Mirror"	Gwen Arner	Story by : Harold Schechter; Teleplay by : Harold Schechter & Eric Overmyer	November 30, 1994
Guy investigates the death of a well-known lawyer.
11	"Camouflage"	Neema Barnette	Eric Overmyer	December 14, 1994
Guy investigates a 12-year-old boy's murder.
12	"Last Tango"	John Bowab	Story by : Max Eisenberg & Lonon Smith; Teleplay by : Max Eisenberg & Lonon Smith & Edward Tivnan	January 4, 1995
A well-known dancer is found murdered.
13	"Comic Book Murder"	Lou Antonio	Story by : Kenneth Cosby & David Black; Teleplay by : Kenneth Cosby & Siobhan Byrne	January 11, 1995
A comic book artist becomes a prime suspect when a well-known artist is found murdered.
14	"Baker's Dozen"	Nick Havinga	Story by : Jack Richardson; Teleplay by : Charles Kipps & Jack Richardson	February 1, 1995
Guy's friend mysteriously vanishes.
15	"The Hit Parade"	Neema Barnette	Lee Goldberg & William Rabkin	March 8, 1995
A professional killer is found dead.
16	"Big Brother Is Watching"	Alan J. Levi	Terence Winter	March 15, 1995
Guy investigates when a boy he's partnered with in a Big Brother's program claims to have witnessed a murder.
17	"The Medium Is the Message"	Alan J. Levi	Paul Robert Coyle	March 22, 1995
A record executive is found murdered on a jogging path.
18	"Goldilocks"	Win Phelps	Lee Goldberg & William Rabkin & Terence Winter	April 5, 1995
Guy returns from holiday early and finds a dead mystery woman's body in his bed.
19	"Dial H for Murder"	Lou Antonio	R.J. Stewart	April 12, 1995
Guy's name is scrawled on a deceased Broadway performer's hand. Note: This is the season finale and the final episode.

== In popular culture ==
- In an episode of The Simpsons, "Guess Who's Coming to Criticize Dinner?", Homer Simpson laments the cancellation of The Cosby Mysteries, saying "That show had limitless possibilities!"
- An episode of Saturday Night Live hosted by Patrick Stewart on February 5, 1994, did a parody sketch of The Cosby Mysteries. Adam Sandler played Cosby as a buffoonish character, who rambles on incoherently with dialog full of made up nonsense words.
