= Ron Crawford =

American actor

- Born: October 11, 1945 (age 80); Tampa, Florida
- Occupations: Actor, artist

Ron Crawford (born October 11, 1945 in Tampa, Florida) is an American actor and artist.

== Filmography ==
=== Film ===
Year	Title	Role	Notes
1995	Home of Angels	Card Player	
2006	Arthur and the Invisibles	Archibald	English version; voice
2007	Christmas Story	Gideon	English version; voice
2008	Our Feature Presentation	Alexander Weever	
2009	Stingray Sam	Old Scientist	
2009	Arthur and the Revenge of Maltazard	Archibald	English version; voice
2010	Arthur 3: The War of the Two Worlds	Archibald	English version; voice
2011	Virgin Alexander	Bucky Mann	
2011	Sweet Little Lies	Arthur	
2011	We Are the Hartmans	Buddy	
2013	Blood Ties	Old	

=== Television ===
Year	Title	Role	Notes
1991	American Playhouse	Willy	Episode: "The Grapes of Wrath"
2000	Spin City	Judge	Episode: "The Pig Whisperer"
2001	Ed	—N/a	Episode: "Mind Over Matter"
2015	The Jack and Triumph Show	Mark Twain	Episode: "Something Racist"
2015	Deadbeat	Hobo #1	Episode: "Good Will Haunting"
2021	Dickinson	Usher	Episode: "Split the Lark"
2021	The Chair	Professor McHale	6 episodes

=== Video games ===
Year	Title	Role	Notes
2018	Red Dead Redemption 2	The Local Pedestrian Population	Voice
