= Arthur and the Invisibles (soundtrack) =

Arthur and the Invisibles: Original Motion Picture Soundtrack

Soundtrack album by Éric Serra
- Released: January 9, 2007
- Recorded: 2007
- Genre: Soundtrack
- Length: 77:52
- Label: Atlantic Records
- Producer: Éric Serra

Éric Serra soundtracks chronology
Bandidas (2006)	Arthur and the Invisibles: Original Motion Picture Soundtrack (2007)	Arthur and the Revenge of Maltazard (2009)

Singles from Arthur and the Invisibles: Original Motion Picture Soundtrack
- 1. "Quest for Love" Released: 9 January 2007; 2. "Go Girl" Released: 2007; 3. "It's a Beautiful Day" Released: 2007

Arthur and the Invisibles: Original Motion Picture Soundtrack is the original soundtrack to the 2006 French film Arthur and the Minimoys and was released by Atlantic Records on January 9, 2007.

== Track listing ==
All music is composed by Éric Serra, except as noted.

No.	Title	Length
1.	"Quest for Love" (composed by Andrea Remanda and Jewel Kilcher and performed by Jewel)	3:20
2.	"Go Girl" (composed by Calvin Broadus and Josef Leimberg and performed by Snoop Dogg)	3:39
3.	"It's a Beautiful Day" (composed by Da. Octopusss, Elijah Harris and Lee Harris and performed by Elijah Harris)	3:23
4.	"The Minimoys Overture"	2:19
5.	"Nice Town"	1:25
6.	"Arthur and the Aqueduct"	1:22
7.	"The Phonecall and the Waxcake"	2:44
8.	"Davido and the Watertank"	0:40
9.	"Small as a Tooth"	1:22
10.	"Stolen Kiss"	1:09
11.	"Grandpa's Mission"	1:07
12.	"The Cloth Ladder"	1:13
13.	"Bogo Matassalai"	4:02
14.	"Try to Be Convincing"	1:53
15.	"Third Ring for the Soul"	1:29
16.	"The Land of the Minimoys"	3:26
17.	"Central Gate"	1:18
18.	"The Blueberry Catapult"	1:15
19.	"Lovebirds"	1:18
20.	"Feeding Time"	1:20
21.	"The Sword of Power"	1:52
22.	"Arthur the Hero"	2:07
23.	"Patchimole"	1:34
24.	"Cosmonut"	2:18
25.	"Nutboat and Laces"	1:07
26.	"Ballad for Granny"	1:06
27.	"In Bed with Selenia"	1:53
28.	"Red Poppy Night"	0:58
29.	"Dragonfly Eggs"	0:45
30.	"Evil Straws"	1:02
31.	"Koolo"	1:31
32.	"Malthazar"	4:15
33.	"No Kiss but Tradition"	1:04
34.	"Show Time in Necropolis"	3:18
35.	"Timeballs"	1:16
36.	"Solid Gate"	0:55
37.	"Eternally Grateful"	1:15
38.	"A Beautiful Sunday"	1:30
39.	"Destruction of Seides"	2:41
40.	"A Bowl of Rubies"	1:16
41.	"Greed and Loneliness"	1:21
42.	"The Minimoys Finale"	3:04
Total length:		77:52
