= Jeffrey Weissman =

American actor (born 1958)

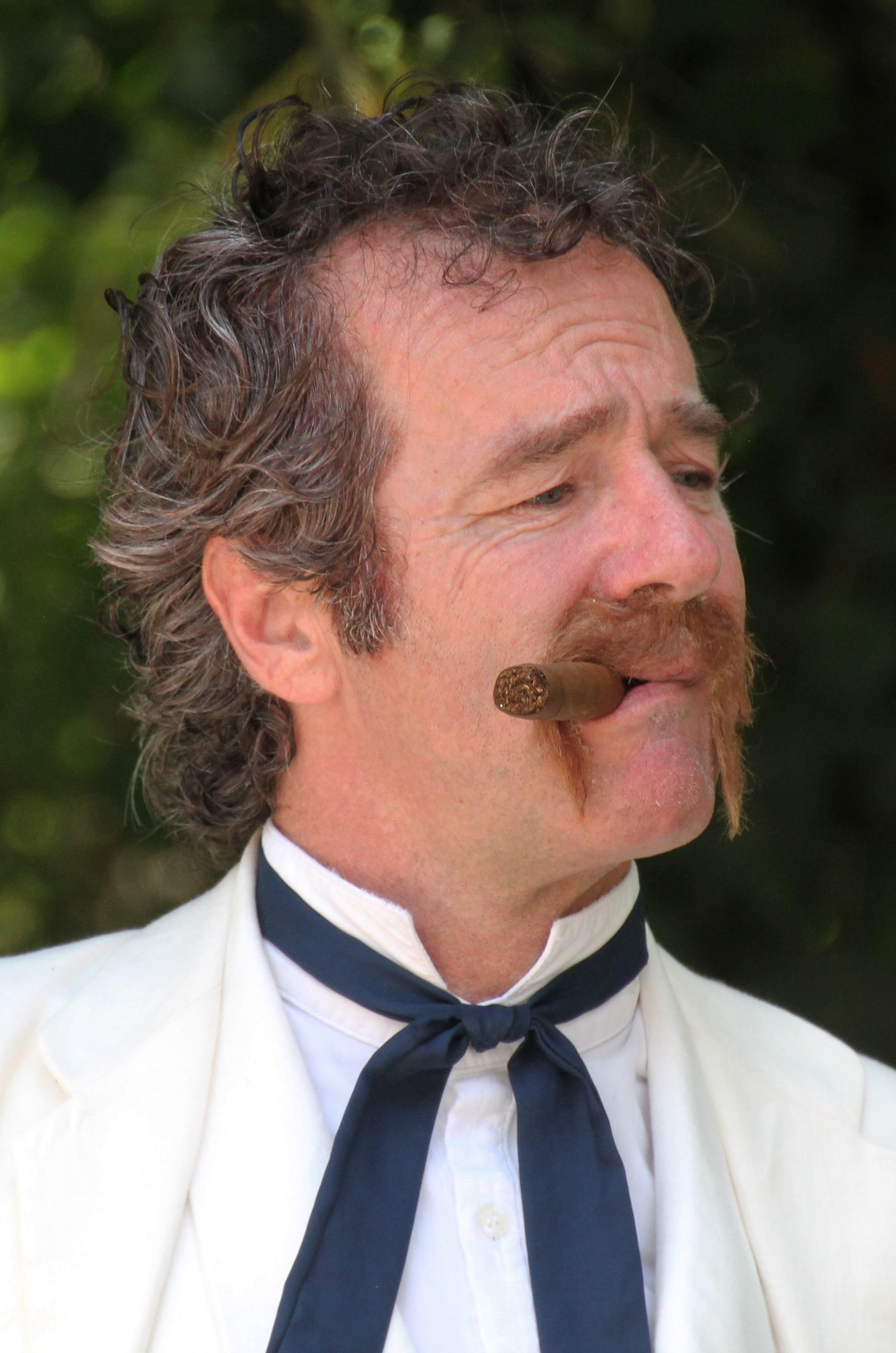
- Jeffrey Weissman as Mark Twain in 2015
- Born: October 2, 1958 (age 67); Santa Monica, California, U.S.
- Occupation: Actor
- Years active: 1972–present
- Spouse: Kimbell Jackson (m. 2004)
- Children: 2
- Website: jeffreyweissman.com

Jeffrey Weissman (born October 2, 1958) is an American actor. He has appeared in dozens of motion pictures and TV shows, most notably as George McFly in Back to the Future Part II and III and as Teddy Conway in Pale Rider. He has guest starred spots on Scarecrow and Mrs. King, Max Headroom, Dallas, The Man Show, and with Dick Van Dyke on Diagnosis: Murder and as Screech's Guru on Saved by the Bell.

Weissman is a teacher of commedia dell'arte and film technique, with students including both professionals and newcomers to the arts. He also teaches acting for film, directing, writing and improv at San Francisco School of Digital Film Making.

== Background ==
Weissman trained in acting and performance at American Conservatory Theater, San Francisco State University, UCLA and Santa Monica City College. His comedic experience includes work with The Second City alumni, Los Angeles Theater Sports, Andy Goldberg and Bill Hudnutt Sitcom Workshops, (formerly Harvey Lembeck). He also trained at Berkeley Rep. in the "Finding the Inner Imp" with Ron Campbell and participated in acting workshops with Peter Flood, Jackie Benton, and Magic Theater Gym. He has trained in dance, movement, storytelling workshops with the Voice of Men In Motion. He also trained under Jackie Benton, Peter Flood, and Bill Hudnut, and was a Varsity Player with Los Angeles Theatersports.

== Career ==
Weissman began his acting career in theatre, in 1972. He has worked in commercials, television shows, and feature films, and is probably best known for his portrayal of the role of George McFly in the two Back to the Future sequels, taking over the role from Crispin Glover, who declined to return from the first film. For the role, Weissman wore extremely heavy makeup to have him resemble Glover, and most of his scenes were shot with him either upside down or in the background. Glover eventually sued the producers for using his likeness without his permission.

He has appeared in roles in feature films including Pale Rider and Twilight Zone: The Movie. He has also made guest appearances on television shows such as Saved by the Bell, The Man Show, Dallas, Max Headroom, Scarecrow and Mrs. King, Chip and Pepper's Cartoon Spectacular, and Divorce Court. His commercial credits include an interactive television commercial for Ameritech and a Christmas commercial for the grocery chain Publix.

Weissman has performed ADR and looping on dozens of projects; Heathers, Loverboy, The Best Times, Crime of Innocence, Pale Rider, Hot Resort, and others.

He has directed for Universal Studios in Japan, and he was artistic director of the ‘Flying Penguins’ improv comedy group, (helping to form the highly acclaimed Los Angeles Theater Sports, now in its 18th year). He has recently been teaching theater games to training teachers at Dominican College, commedia dell'arte & "The Business of Acting" at Sonoma State University, as well as "Kidprov" & "Teenprov" workshops & shows at various libraries in Marin County and South San Francisco.

Weissman is also an avid activist for charity events, since the mid 1970s.

== Personal life ==
Weissman met his wife Kimbell Jackson in 1972, while working in children's theatre, they married in 2004. The couple has two sons.

== Filmography ==
=== Feature films ===
- 1983: Twilight Zone: The Movie as Young Husband
- 1984: Johnny Dangerously as Tee Shirt Vendor
- 1984: Crackers as Backstage Dancer
- 1985: Pale Rider as Teddy Conway
- 1989: Back to the Future Part II as George McFly
- 1990: Back to the Future Part III as George McFly
- 1991: For the Boys as the North Africa Stage Manager
- 1998: BASEketball as Hospital Orderly (uncredited)
- 2001: To Protect & To Serve as Jean Goddard
- 2001: 2001: A Space Travesty as Groucho
- 2001: Max Keeble's Big Move as McGoogles (bodysuit)
- 2004: Slapdash as Mosley
- 2005: Return to Sender as Old Comic
- 2005: Angels with Angles as Groucho
- 2006: Night Fliers as Lee Hawthorn
- 2006: Car Babes as Jay
- 2006: Looking Back at the Future (documentary) as himself
- 2007: Hats Off as Dr. Ball
- 2008: Corked as Jerry Hannon
- 2008: Our Feature Presentation as Hugo Wilmington
- 2009: American Disciples as Dr Garownski
- 2010: Chateau Meroux as Roy Hutchinson
- 2010: Bottle Caps as Howard
- 2012: Dam California as Harvey
- 2013: Torn as Mr. Angr
- 2014: Witches Blood as Uncle George
- 2015: The Boat Builder as Bud
- 2025: No Address as Corey Smart

=== Television ===
- 1984: Scarecrow and Mrs. King: "Filming Raoul"
- 1985: Dallas: "Lovers and Other Strangers"
- 1987: Max Headroom: "Rakers"
- 198?: Divorce Court: "Cott Vs. Cott"
- 1991: Saved By the Bell: "Rockumentary"
- 1992: NBC Cartoon Spectacular: "Chip and Pepper"
- 2000: Diagnosis: Murder: "Two Birds With One Sloan"
- 2002: The Man Show: "Assoholics Anonymous"
- 2020: The Show Must Go Online: "Twelfth Night"
- 2021: Bingewatch and Friends: "Magical Intrigues"

=== Mini-series ===
- 1994: The Stand
- 2000: The '70s

=== Short films ===
- 1996: He's Dead, But He Won't Lie Down
- 1997: Garbage
- 1998: god@heaven
- 2003: Touched
- 2007: Edible as Father
- 2008: We Missed You, Pete
- 2011: Kosher

=== Theatre ===
- 1998: Tallulah (Hollywood)
- 2004: Tony Kushner's The Illusion (Cinnabar Theater)
- 2005: Mellisa Gibson's "[sic]" (6th St. Playhouse/Sonoma Actor's Theatre)
- 2005: William Shakespeare's Twelfth Night
- 2006: Tease-O-Rama Baggy Trouser Blackout Comedy, at Bimbo's 365 Club
- 2006: Just For Laughs (SF Fringe Festival)
- 2007: Just For Laughs (fundraiser establishing a Theater Department Schoarship at OSU)
