= Don't Drink the Water (1994 film) =

1994 television film by Woody Allen

- DVD artwork
- Genre: Comedy
- Written by: Woody Allen
- Directed by: Woody Allen
- Starring: Woody Allen; Mayim Bialik; Michael J. Fox; Dom DeLuise; Julie Kavner; Edward Herrmann
- Narrated by: Ed Herlihy
- Country of origin: United States
- Original language: English

Production
- Executive producers: J.E. Beaucaire; Jean Doumanian
- Producer: Robert Greenhut
- Cinematography: Carlo Di Palma
- Editor: Susan E. Morse
- Running time: 92 minutes
- Production companies: Jean Doumanian Productions; Magnolia Productions; Sweetland Films

Original release
- Network: ABC
- Release: December 18, 1994

Don't Drink the Water is a 1994 American made-for-television comedy film written and directed by Woody Allen, based on his 1966 play. This is the second filmed version of the play, after a 1969 film starring Jackie Gleason left Allen dissatisfied.

The story revolves around a family of American tourists (played by Allen, Julie Kavner, and Mayim Bialik) that gets trapped behind the Iron Curtain. Michael J. Fox plays the American ambassador's son.

This is the second time Allen wrote and performed in a movie made for television (Men of Crisis: The Harvey Wallinger Story was filmed in 1971 but was never broadcast). The film was not well-received by critics.

== Cast ==
- Woody Allen as Walter Hollander
- Julie Kavner as Marion Hollander
- Mayim Bialik as Susan Hollander
- Michael J. Fox as Axel Magee
- Dom DeLuise as Father Drobney
- Josef Sommer as Ambassador Magee
- Edward Herrmann as Mr. Kilroy
- Robert Stanton as Mr. Burns
- Rosemary Murphy as Miss Pritchard
- Austin Pendleton as Chef Oscar

== Reception ==
Don't Drink the Water has a 44% approval rating on Rotten Tomatoes. In 2016 film critics Robbie Collin and Tim Robey ranked it as one of the worst movies by Woody Allen.

== Year-end lists ==
- Honorable mention – Jeff Simon, The Buffalo News
