= Arthur and the Minimoys =

2006 film by Luc Besson

- Theatrical release poster
- French: Arthur et les Minimoys
- Directed by: Luc Besson
- Written by: Luc Besson; Céline Garcia
- Story by: Luc Besson
- Based on: Arthur and the Minimoys and Arthur and the Forbidden City by Luc Besson
- Produced by: Luc Besson; Emmanuel Prévost
- Starring: Freddie Highmore; Mylene Farmer; Mia Farrow; Alain Bashung
- Cinematography: Thierry Arbogast
- Edited by: Karim Benhammouda; Yann Hervé; Vincent Tabaillon
- Music by: Éric Serra
- Production companies: EuropaCorp; Avalanche Productions; Apipoulaï Prod; Canal+
- Distributed by: EuropaCorp
- Release dates: 29 November 2006 (France); 12 January 2007 (United States)
- Running time: 103 minutes
- Country: France
- Language: English
- Budget: €60 million
- Box office: $107.9 million

Arthur and the Minimoys (French: Arthur et les Minimoys) is a 2006 English-language French live-action animated fantasy adventure film directed and co-written by Luc Besson. It is based on the first two books of the Arthur children's book series by Besson.

Arthur and the Minimoys was released theatrically in France on 29 November 2006 by EuropaCorp. With a budget of €60 million, it was the most expensive French film ever produced at the time. It grossed $46 million at the French box office. The film's soundtrack album was released in 2007.

For its US release, The Weinstein Company edited the film, cutting the running time by nine minutes, adding narration and reducing the sexual innuendo. It was released under the title Arthur and the Invisibles. This version received generally negative reviews from critics, and grossed $15 million in the US, with a worldwide total for both versions of $108 million.

The film's success in France spawned a franchise, including two sequels, Arthur and the Revenge of Maltazard (2009) and Arthur 3: The War of the Two Worlds (2010), a spin-off film, Arthur, malédiction (2022), multiple video games, an animated television series, and theme park attractions at Futuroscope and Europa-Park.

== Plot ==
In 1960, 10-year-old Arthur Montgomery lives with his grandmother Daisy in a quiet farm house on a dirt road, in a small rural community in Northeastern Connecticut (based on Sterling). His grandfather Archibald has recently gone missing and he sees little of his parents (who are away looking for work). Daisy entertains Arthur with stories of his grandfather's adventures in Africa, featuring the tall Bogo Matassalai and the minuscule Minimoys, the latter of whom now live in Archibald's garden, protecting a collection of rubies. Arthur becomes enamoured of a picture of Selenia, the princess of the Minimoys.

When Daisy receives a two-day deadline to pay a large sum of money to a building developer named Ernest Davido, who plans to evict the two, Arthur looks for the rubies to pay off the debt and discovers various clues left by his grandfather. He is met in the garden by the Bogo Matassalai, who reduce Arthur to Minimoy size. From the Minimoys, Arthur learns that they are in danger from Maltazard, a Minimoy war hero who now rules the nearby "Necropolis", after corruption by a weevil, by whom he has a son named Darkos.

Arthur, reflecting his legendary British namesake, draws a sacred sword from its recess and uses it to protect the Minimoys from Maltazard's soldiers; whereupon Sifrat, the ruler of the Minimoys, sends Arthur to Necropolis, with the princess Selenia and her brother Betameche. En route, they are attacked on two occasions by Maltazard's soldiers.

In Necropolis, Selenia kisses Arthur, marking him as her husband and potential successor, and confronts Maltazard alone. When Maltazard learns that she has already kissed Arthur and thus can no longer give him her powers and cure his corruption, he imprisons all three, who discover a Minimoy form of Archibald.

Thereafter Arthur and his grandfather escape and return to human form, with little time to spare before Maltazard's flood reaches the Minimoys. With the help of Mino, a royal advisor's long-lost son, Arthur redirects the flood to Necropolis, whereupon Maltazard abandons Necropolis and his son, and the water ejects the rubies above ground. Archibald pays Davido with one ruby; and when he tries to take them all, the Bogo Matassalai capture him and give him to the authorities. Arthur asks Selenia to wait for his return, and her agreement to do so ends the film.

== Cast ==
=== Live-action cast ===
- Freddie Highmore as Arthur Montgomery, a newly ten-year-old boy who journeys through the invisible world of the minimoys to find the treasure his long-lost grandfather had hidden. Highmore also voices Arthur in his CGI animated Minimoy form. In the French version, Arthur is voiced by actress Barbara Kelsch who also provided the motion-capture performance for the character.
- Mia Farrow as Daisy Suchot, Arthur's maternal grandmother and Archibald's wife.
- Ron Crawford as Archibald Suchot, Arthur's maternal grandfather and Daisy's husband. Crawford also voices Archibald in his animated Minimoy form. The character is voiced by actor Michel Duchaussoy in the French version.
- Penny Balfour as Rose Montgomery, Arthur's mother and Daisy and Archibald's daughter. The character is voiced by actress Valérie Lemercier in the French version.
- Douglas Rand as Armand Montgomery, Arthur's father and Rose's husband. The character is voiced by actor Jean-Paul Rouve in the French version and in both the original and the Weinstein Company versions, Rand's voice was dubbed in a British accent by Robert Dauney.
- Adam LeFevre as Ernest Davido, the Real Estate Agent. The character is voiced by actor José Garcia in the French version.
- Jean Betote Njamba as The Chief of the Matassalai. The character is voiced by rapper Doudou Masta in the French version.
- An uncredited German Shepherd as Alfred, Arthur's pet dog.

=== Voice cast ===
- Madonna as Princess Selenia, the daughter of Emperor Sifrat. The character is voiced by singer Mylène Farmer in the French version.
- Douglas Rand (in the original version) and Jimmy Fallon (in the Weinstein Company version) as Prince Simono Matradoy de Betameche, or simply Betameche "Beta", Selenia's younger brother. The character is voiced by radio host Cartman in the French version. Rand also voices Miro, the royal advisor and Mino's father (in the original version) who was voiced by Harvey Keitel in the Weinstein Company version.
- Robert De Niro as Emperor Sifrat XVI, Betameche and Selenia's father.
- Tonio Descanvelle (in the original version) and Emilio Estevez (in the Weinstein Company version) as The Ferryman. The character is voiced by singer Dick Rivers in the French version.
- Chazz Palminteri as The Travel Agent
- Snoop Dogg as Max, the leader of the Koolamassai, a race of beings similar to the Minimoys. The character is voiced by rapper Rohff in the French version.
- Allen Hoist as DJ Easy Low, a Koolamassai. The character is voiced by DJ Cut Killer in the French version. Hoist also voices another Koolamassai (in the original version) who was voiced by Anthony Anderson in the Weinstein Company version.
- Christian Erickson (in the original version) and Jason Bateman (in the Weinstein Company version) as Prince Darkos, Maltazard's vicious but dim-witted son. The character is voiced by actor Marc Lavoine in the French version. Erickson also voices an antique dealer.
- David Bowie as Emperor Maltazard (also known as the Evil M, Maltazard the Evil, or Malthazar the Cursed). The character is voiced by singer Alain Bashung in the French version.
- Barbara Weber Scaff (in the original version) and Erik Per Sullivan (in the Weinstein Company version) as Mino, Miro's long lost son. Per Sullivan also voices a baby bug.
- Rob Corddry and Nate Corddry (in the Weinstein Company version) as the Seides
- Ron Crawford (in the original version) and David Suchet (in the Weinstein Company version) as The Narrator

== Production ==
=== Genesis and development ===
''A little boy able to enter a world of elves''. With this idea, conceived by Patrice and Céline Garcia, Luc Besson wanted to make it into a film. Before writing a script, he wrote and published the book Arthur and the Minimoys in 2002, based on the original idea by Céline Garcia and illustrated by Patrice. Three other books were published subsequently: Arthur and the Forbidden City (2003), Arthur and the Revenge of Maltazard (2004), and Arthur and the War of the Two Worlds (2005). Luc Besson then wrote the script for the first film with Céline Garcia, which incorporates the plots of the first two books.

=== Casting ===
To find the actor for Arthur, Luc Besson conducted an extensive casting process worldwide: "I had a lot of trouble, and was hesitating between three English actors and two Americans when a casting director, who was external to the project, suggested I take a look at the photos of Freddie Highmore. Charlie and the Chocolate Factory had just been filmed, I went to see it and immediately fell in love with him."

Even though this film is “100% French” in origin, all the actors come from Great Britain or the United States. The film was therefore shot in English. Besson directed their performances. In terms of lip sync with actors' dialog, the French animators could not cope with the English phonemes. For Madonna and David Bowie, a camera was used to record their lips to help the animators. The animation was done with proprietary software.

In terms of voice casting, several artists, singers, and musicians are featured: Mylène Farmer as Sélénia, rapper Rohff as Max, Alain Bashung as Maltazard, along with Doudou Masta, Stomy Bugsy, Cut Killer, and Dick Rivers. In the English version, Madonna, Snoop Dogg, and David Bowie are part of the cast. Furthermore, Barbara Kelsch, who voices Arthur in the French version, also dubbed Milla Jovovich in The Fifth Element.

=== Filming ===
The animation was produced by the French company BUF Compagnie, which hired approximately 100 animators, most of them from French animation schools and without any previous experience. Besson wanted a photorealistic environment, and BUF initially used microlenses to film physical environments, but eventually instead used photogrammetry, where a digitized photograph of a real object is manipulated with a computer. Sets were built to 1:3 scale, which allowed the animators to use natural elements, such as plants and grass. While the film did not use motion capture, real actors were used as reference, and recorded with 13 to 14 video cameras, but without the markers used in motion capture.

While some scenes were shot at the studios of Épinay-sur-Seine, most of the sets and models were installed in Pantin, in an old grain silo that Pierre Buffin (the animation director) and his team at BUF Compagnie transformed into a high-tech studio. 225 people were gathered there for the animation work, which lasted nearly 27 months, notably for the creation of the 3D sequences. The character animation was created using a motion recording system without the usual sensors, invented by Pierre Buffin, allowing actors greater freedom of movement.

I found it more interesting to propose something new that had never been done before. This is the case with this film, which mixes 3D characters evolving in 3D sets but drawn from real models: we really built the giant mushrooms you see in the film! This gives a unique image and rendering: it's our way to enter the competition, to compete with them, even if we are just a very small company in comparison.

— Luc Besson

The live-action scenes with the actors were filmed in Normandy.

== American version ==
After a screening test in the United States, The Weinstein Company (TWC) re-edited the film under the title Arthur and the Invisibles. Approximately nine minutes were cut. Most of the edits pertained to the love story between Arthur and Selenia due to age differences. The entire storyline involving the parents and their greed for money was also deleted, reduced to a short scene and the narrator explaining that worrying over their son was all they needed to reform completely. In addition to these deleted scenes, The Weinstein Company's version also adds in new narration by David Suchet replacing Ron Crawford's narration as Archibald, along with actors Jimmy Fallon (Prince Simono Matradoy), Jason Bateman (Prince Darkos), Emilio Estevez (Ferryman), Harvey Keitel (Miro), Rob Corddry and Nate Corddry (both voiced Seides), Erik Per Sullivan (Mino and the baby bug), and Anthony Anderson (one of the Koolamassai) replacing various actors from the original version.

The American version of the film was theatrically released on 12 January 2007 by Metro-Goldwyn-Mayer (MGM) and TWC. The British and Australian versions of the film, also distributed by TWC, similarly had these changes. This release is now out-of-print following the closure of TWC other than US and UK DVDs.

=== Technology ===
The Minimoys featured in the first augmented reality Nestlé Chocapic cereal box with the help of Dassault Systèmes technology 3DVIA Virtools.

== Soundtrack ==
There was a soundtrack based on this film released under the former-Invisibles title. It was released two weeks before the American premiere. This soundtrack is now out-of-print.

== Availability ==
The original version was uploaded on YouTube in 2021, but was taken down due to legal issues, while the Weinstein cut was never distributed or renewed after the closure of The Weinstein Company following the arrest of Harvey Weinstein on 25 May 2018 other than US and UK DVDs. In 2023, the film returned to circulation with the original content restored. It is available to watch through Disney+ and digital storefronts such as Apple TV and Amazon Prime.

== Reception ==
=== Box office ===
The film was budgeted at $86 million. In its first two weeks in cinemas in France Arthur earned over US$20 million.

=== Critical response in France ===
The film gained positive attention in France and became a box-office success.

=== Awards ===
In 2007, the film received two awards: on 1 February for Imagina Award in the category Prix du Long-Métrage and on 1 October, Mylène Farmer was awarded the NRJ Ciné Award for her dubbing of Sélénia's voice in Arthur and the Minimoys.

=== Copyright issues ===
On 8 January 2016, the Court of First Instance in Paris ruled that four illustrators involved in the design of the film — Philippe Rouchier, Robert Cepo, Georges Bouchelaghem, and Nicolas Fructus — were considered "co-authors" since their contributions constituted an essential element of the film. As a result, they were awarded a percentage of the profits instead of the flat fee stipulated in their contracts.

=== Critical response to the American cut ===
The American cut received largely negative reviews upon its release in early 2007. It has an approval rating of 22% via Rotten Tomatoes, based on reviews from 91 critics, with an average rating of 4.4/10. The site's consensus reads: "Arthur wastes its big-name voice talent on a predictable script and substandard CG animation". Metacritic, which uses a weighted average, assigned the film a score of 39 out of 100, based on 22 critics, indicating "generally unfavorable" reviews. Audiences polled by CinemaScore gave the film an average grade of "A-" on an A+ to F scale.

Los Angeles Times reviewer Alex Chun wrote: "Director Luc Besson admits he knew nothing about animation before he started this project, and it shows". Variety's Robert Koehler called it "alienating and dislikable", and specifically noted that "…having African-American thesps Snoop Dogg and Anthony Anderson voice creatures that are basically humanoid monkeys shows poor taste".

Many found it derivative of sources ranging from King Arthur and The Sword in the Stone to The Dark Crystal and The Ant Bully films. Frank Lovece of Film Journal International said that "it all simply looks as if [conceptual artist Patrice] Garcia and Besson couldn't decide on any one thing to copy, …so they copied them all". Lovece also noted that "the whole thing gets seriously creepy when [the animated versions of] the grown-up, pinup-beauty princess and the 10-year-old boy fall for each other. Mary Kay Letourneau comes uncomfortably to mind". Common Sense Media disliked the film, giving it 2 stars out of 5. Josh Tyler of CinemaBlend greatly disliked the film, giving it 1.5 stars out of 5: "Sure it has sometimes-loved French director Luc Besson's name on it, but the character designs look like they were stolen from those wispy haired troll dolls that were popular for about five minutes fifteen years ago, and the plot sounded like it was written by a ten-year-old kid underneath a heavy bedspread, with a big chief tablet and a pencil the size of a horse's leg". Besson, in a May 2007 interview, blamed American distributor The Weinstein Company for the film's failure in the U.S., saying "…why the critics didn't like Arthur was because [Weinstein] changed so much of the film and tried to pretend the film was American. […] America and the UK were the only countries where the films were changed. The rest of the world has the same film as France."

== Franchise ==
=== Sequels ===
Arthur and the Minimoys was followed by a 2009 sequel, Arthur and the Revenge of Maltazard, based on the novel of the same name, and another sequel in 2010 titled Arthur 3: The War of the Two Worlds, based on the final book in the series. In the United States, they were distributed by 20th Century Fox instead of the now-defunct Weinstein Company that originally distributed Arthur and the Minimoys. In the UK and Ireland, both sequels were combined into a single movie, Arthur and the Great Adventure, released in December 2010. Both sequels generated huge losses for EuropaCorp.

=== Video game ===
A video game based on Arthur and the Minimoys was marketed for PlayStation 2, PC, and Nintendo DS during the film's release in Europe in 2006. It was marketed in the US under the film's now-former Invisibles title.

=== Television series ===
An animated TV series of the same name was produced by Studio 100 and EuropaCorp Animation, and debuted on 17 July 2018. A 20-episode web series was also being planned.

=== Attractions ===
==== Arthur, The 4D Adventure ====
In parallel with the film trilogy, an attraction was created at the Futuroscope park. Titled Arthur, The 4D Adventure, it opened on 19 December 2009 in the Dynamic IMAX pavilion. It features a motion simulator, providing a 3D film of 4' 30" in OMNIMAX format, projected on a hemispherical screen of 900 m2.

The total cost of the attraction was 6 million euros, including 1.8 million euros for the design, construction, and decor, and 4.2 million euros for the production of the 3D film. Just like the trilogy, the production of the short film is handled by Luc Besson and the French studio Buf Compagnie.

==== Arthur in the Land of the Minimoys ====
In July 2014, a new attraction based on Arthur and the Minimoys opened at the German amusement park Europa-Park. Unlike the Futuroscope park, here a part of the film's universe is recreated, including the Minimoys' village, Paradise Alley, and much more. This new area of Europa-Park required a year and a half of construction and cost 25 million euros, making it the most ambitious project at the amusement park since its opening.

This universe is primarily located indoors and consists of three attractions, including a roller coaster, a drop tower, and a carousel, with the latter two being reserved for children.

At the opening, Luc Besson stated that Arthur now has his home, and that it is at Europa-Park. Indeed, in the French park, the universe of Arthur and the Minimoys is only represented on a 4-D cinema screen.

=== Spin-off ===
A psychological horror-themed spin-off, titled Arthur, malédiction, was produced. Written by Besson and directed by Barthélemy Grossmann, the film is not set in the same universe and follows a group of teenagers who are looking for the house where the original trilogy was filmed only to find that it is in reality haunted. It was released theatrically in France on 29 June 2022. The film was poorly received by critics and fans of the franchise and is considered to be one of the worst films ever made.
