= Arthur, malédiction =

2022 French psychological horror film

- Theatrical release poster
- Directed by: Barthélemy Grossmann
- Screenplay by: Luc Besson
- Based on: Arthur by Luc Besson
- Produced by: Luc Besson; Fanny Besson
- Starring: Mathieu Berger; Thalia Besson; Lola Andreoni; Mikaël Halimi; Yann Mendy; Jade Pedri; Vadim Agid; Marceau Ebersolt
- Cinematography: Colin Wandersman
- Edited by: Julien Rey
- Music by: 38ème Donne
- Production companies: EuropaCorp; Luc Besson Production; Kinology; Cofinova 17; Canal+; Cine+
- Distributed by: Apollo Films
- Release date: 29 June 2022
- Running time: 87 minutes
- Country: France
- Language: French
- Budget: €2.2 million
- Box office: €1.3 million

Arthur, malédiction (transl. Arthur, curse) is a 2022 French psychological horror film directed by Barthélemy Grossmann. Based on the Arthur novels by Luc Besson, the film serves as a spin-off and the fourth installment of its film series, with the prior trilogy presented as films-within-a-film. The film stars an ensemble cast, and follows a group of Arthur fans who discover the house that was used as one of the trilogy live-action sequences set, only to find themselves being hunted down one-by-one by a group of deranged role-players.

Production secretly started in 2020 in Normandy. It is the first Arthur film to be rated "prohibited to spectators under 12 years old" by the French Cinematographic Works Classification Board and the first to be filmed in French language. It is also the only film in the series not distributed by EuropaCorp following the company financial difficulty.

Arthur, malédiction was released in France on 29 June 2022 by Apollo Films. It was poorly received by critics, and grossed only €1 million against a €2 million budget, making it a box-office bomb.

== Plot ==
Eight-year-old Alex and his friends Samantha, Jean, Mathilde, Renata, Maxime, Douglas, and Dominique gather to watch the Arthur film trilogy. Alex expresses his dream of becoming a Minimoy. Ten years later, 18-year-old Alex disguises himself as Arthur to evade the gendarmes. Meanwhile, Jean, Mathilde, Renata, Maxime, Douglas, and Dominique prepare for Alex's birthday party.

Samantha surprises Alex by arriving dressed as Princess Selenia. They celebrate with cake and presents. Later, they watch the films again and discover that their friends Momo and Pilou have found the house used as a film set. Excited, the group embarks on a journey to find the house. During their trip, they encounter strange events. In a quiet town, the locals observe them closely. They then come across a house where an inhabitant, with his dogs, warns them about the dangerous surroundings and shoots his gun to scare the friends away, making them run back to their car. Undeterred, they find a road leading to the house but are halted by a fallen tree. The group continue on foot while Renata marks the path with ribbons.

The friends explore the house, finding the film props and a hatch leading to the basement. Upstairs, they discover camping equipment belonging to Momo and Pilou. Maxime and Dominique join the others upstairs, while Alex and Samantha explore the basement. They find a blocked door and decide to regroup with the rest. However, Jean startles them by appearing in full film character makeup. The group sets up camp near the house, enjoying the evening. Alex and Samantha confess their feelings for each other and share a kiss. During the night, Alex has a nightmare about Momo, Pilou, and himself being attacked. He wakes up to see lights in the distance but receives no response when he calls out.

The next day, they find their food eaten, and Douglas sets off to buy supplies, only to be killed by the attackers. Maxime and Dominique discover Momo hanging upside down from a tree, and Maxime, who tries to get him down, gets caught in a bear trap and Momo falls to his death, before Dominique frees Maxime and head back to the house. Meanwhile, the rest of the group finds a hole that resembles the gateway to the Minimoy kingdom. They lower Jean with a camera, but something pulls him down, and Alex saves him by cutting the rope. Tensions rise, and Renata suggests they go home. After finding out that Maxime is injured, Alex, Jean and Dominique take him to the car to get him to the hospital and search for Douglas. While Samantha and Renata are distracted by listening to music, Mathilde, in her panic, notices an unidentified person is in the house and barricades herself in a barn, where she gets stung by a swarm of bees, which the unidentified person was on the roof banging on top to disturb the hive. When Alex and Jean find out that Douglas is dead after seeing his ripped off arms stuck in the tree, they realize that Dominique and Maxime have been attacked near the car.

The boys rush back to the house to warn the girls, until the unidentified person cuts down the front porch swing Samantha is sitting on. She falls down below, gets kidnapped and dragged into the basement. Alex and Jean follow to rescue her, during which they discover that Pilou is dead. Suddenly, after successfully saving Samantha, Alex gets knocked out by a strange monster who fooled them by blending into the walls. Alex, Samantha, Jean and Renata awaken and notice they are being tied up and surrounded by people dressed as Matassalai, characters from the Arthur trilogy. The Matassalai plan to send Alex into the world of the Minimoys, but Jean cuts the rope and starts to fight them, while Renata creates a diversion to help Alex break free and Samantha makes an escape to try to get help. Out of nowhere, Renata gets stabbed through her abdomen by a group of Minions, who fight the Matassalai, and Samantha gets attacked by a person dressed up as the villain Maltazard, who begins to strangle her. Alex, Samantha, and Jean are saved by the paranoid inhabitant, who points his gun at the attackers and shoots them. After that, the inhabitant approaches Alex and tells him to never come back the house again before leaving.

As the police arrive, an officer informs Alex, Samantha and Jean that they are going to take them to the infirmary at the police station and they have managed to locate the bodies of Alex's friends and will be repatriated. They even found Mathilde dead in the barn, due to her bee allergy. When Alex asks the officer who the attackers were, it is revealed that they are actually drug-addicted teenagers, who do role-playing games. Three years ago, the teenagers did a role-play game on Batman vs. Superman by jumping off buildings thinking they could fly. When they found out about the Arthur films, they decided to role-play those at the house for the weekends, take drugs, fought and some of them ended up dead.

In the aftermath, Alex, Samantha and Jean leave in a police van that takes them to the infirmary, unaware of the unidentified person observing them from the house. After that, the house is surrounded by police and medical examiners, dealing with the corpses of the attackers and Alex's friends.

== Cast ==
- Mathieu Berger as Alex
- Thalia Besson as Samantha
- Lola Andreoni as Mathilde
- Mikaël Halimi as Douglas
- Yann Mendy as Jean
- Jade Pedri as Renata
- Vadim Agid as Maxime
- Marceau Ebersolt as Dominique
- Didier Manuel as Maltazard
- Mahamadou Coulibaly as Chief Massaï
- Ludovic Berthillot as The Inhabitant

=== English dub cast ===
- Tod Fennell as Alex
- Thalia Besson as Samantha
- Eleanor Noble as Mathilde
- Julian Stamboulieh as Douglas
- Jaa Smith-Johnson as Jean
- Shawn Baichoo as Maxime
- Paul Zinno as Dominique

== Production ==
Luc Besson initially asked students from his film school Cité du Cinéma to write a horror spin-off of Arthur and the Minimoys, Following a viral review of the movie in 2022, an anonymous student revealed online that the production heavily exploited students. They were hired under the guise of an internship. Even though they were eventually paid minimum wage because having that many unpaid interns was illegal, they were systematically underpaid. Students worked complex roles like camera assistants and sound technicians but were officially contracted and compensated at the bare minimum rate for a standard runner. The anonymous student even revealed that the production was too cheap to hire professional stunt doubles. Students were forced to act as extras and perform stunts without proper training, contracts, or safety protection. After reading their drafts, he rejected them and wrote the script entirely by himself. The students felt there was no room to criticize or correct the project because nobody was allowed to contradict the director, Barthélémy Grossmann, or Luc Besson who was controlling things from behind the scenes. Students noted that the original script contained racist reflections, which were eventually deleted. They also tried to rewrite the weak third act, but Grossmann warned them not to alter what Besson had written too much. Due to heavy production delays—the shoot was extended from 5 weeks to 6 weeks—Luc Besson personally took over the directing duties in the fourth week to complete the movie.

Principal photography began in secret in the summer 2020 in Normandy, where the original films were filmed and using the same house, between the first and second lockdown during the COVID-19 pandemic. It lasted 33 days.

The students that during weekly parties organized on the shoot, a technician repeatedly jumped on female students, grabbing their chests and forcing kisses onto them. When that behavior was brought up, Fanny Besson (Luc Besson's sister and the production manager of the film) minimized the incidents. She reportedly told the victims that they needed to get used to it because the film industry is full of flawed men, and that they should just "slap them on the nose" to move on. Horrified by the administration's "lunar" reaction, the students had to organize their own "counter-parties" to protect one another and avoid being left alone around predatory staff. Ultimately, the school suffered consecutive heavy financial deficits during the film's production, and alongside the fallout of these management and misconduct scandals, it was forced to close its doors for good shortly after Murder Mystery 2 was filmed there.

Filming took place in the Orne department, at the Château des Laitiers, owned by Luc Besson, where Arthur and the Minimoys and The Messenger: The Story of Joan of Arc were also filmed.

== Release ==
=== Theatrical ===
Arthur, malédiction was released in France on 29 June 2022 by Apollo Films.

=== Home media ===
Arthur, malédiction was released in France on DVD, and digitally on 7 December 2022 by EuropaCorp, with distribution handled by ESC Distribution. A Blu-ray edition was planned but was canceled without explanation.

== Reception ==
In France, the film obtained an average score of 1.8 out of 5 on the Allociné site, which lists five press titles.

Few press outlets have reviewed the film, which reflects the lack of enthusiasm and interest for this installment of the series. Despite this, Le Parisien gave a positive review, stating that it "takes its time to raise the tension and does not overbid, but the result is entertaining and effective." Les Inrockuptibles gave the film a negative review, but equivocates that "even if it looks like a desperate headlong rush that will probably mark a milestone, Arthur Malédiction has at least in itself a certain audacity, and can, in spite of all forms of good taste, call itself unprecedented without a quivering chin." Écran Large and Télérama were both derisive, with Écran Large saying it's "the absolute renunciation of everything that founded [Luc Besson's] cinema, and Télérama saying "What ensues is a killing game as imaginative as a credit card receipt, suffered by young unknown actors (including Thalia Besson, the producer's daughter) who probably did not deserve this."

== Controversies ==
Shortly after its release, several students from the Cité du Cinéma, a film school founded by Luc Besson, denounced that they were asked to work on the film for free and uncredited. A former student of the school detailed the dangers and abuses when working with Besson, whom they further accused of taking advantage of his students' inexperience.

On Twitter, Arthur Reudet, a young assistant-director and alumn of the Cité du Cinéma, remarked, without explicitly accusing Besson of plagiarism, that Arthur, malédiction had several similarities with a short film he directed in 2017, based on the same screenplay, starring Shannah Besson, one of Luc Besson's daughters.

== See also ==
- Metacinema
