= Paul Greenberg (producer) =

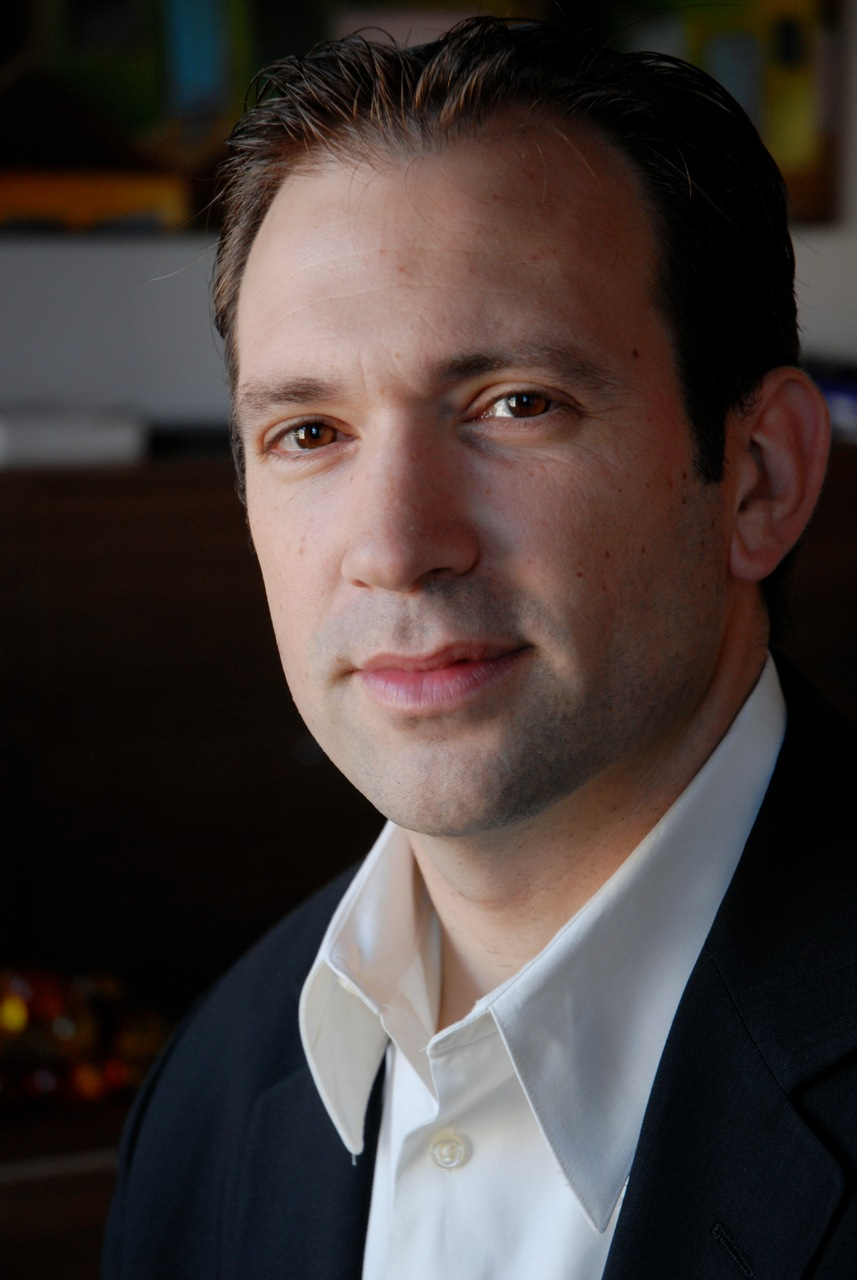
- Born: Liverpool, England
- Education: Manchester Metropolitan University
- Occupations: Producer, director
- Years active: 1988–present

Paul Greenberg is a producer and director of commercials and films. Originally from Liverpool, England, he moved to Los Angeles in 1991.

== Biography ==
Paul Greenberg's interest in film making began at the age of 13. His involvement in the production of short films and corporate videos gave him an early education in the basics of film production. At 16 he was awarded the Young Filmmaker Award by Sony for his original production about his hometown Liverpool.

When he turned 18, Greenberg was selected from over 2000 applicants to fill one of the 16 places at the Prestigious Manchester Metropolitan University Film Program. Greenberg focused on film production and direction, earning Honors in his Bachelor of Arts degree three years later.

The day after his graduation he boarded a flight to Los Angeles. Greenberg quickly moved up the ranks, and within three years had already landed his first film directing gig, shooting "It's a Digital World" on the Universal Studios Backlot. Featuring a cast of hundreds, this live action kids musical also featured technologically advanced computer animated characters - a groundbreaking feat for its time. Greenberg also discovered child actress, Jessica Biel, who went on to achieve international acclaim as a Hollywood leading lady. Jessica Biel was a complete unknown when she arrived in Hollywood at the age of 13. Greenberg launched Biel's career by casting her in her first on-screen role. Greenberg also produced the feature "Angels with Angles" starring Rodney Dangerfield and Frank Gorshin (playing the roles of God and George Burns respectively) in what would become the final movie performances of their lives. Greenberg chose to focus his attention on the lucrative Direct Response Television business for the next decade, achieving unprecedented success. The 35 half-hour TV shows he produced and directed during that time grossed over $3 Billion dollars in sales.

Greenberg worked as Vice-President of production at Sylmark (now IdealLiving) before moving on to serve as Chief Creative Officer for Thane Direct. Greenberg currently runs and operates his own production company Greenberg Direct, Inc.

Greenberg recently returned to his movie-making roots and has three screenplays currently in development.

He is a voting member of the British Academy of Film and Television Arts (BAFTA) and is a Licensed Private Pilot.
