= Paul Greenberg (executive) =

Paul Greenberg is the CEO of Butter Works, a digital consulting firm. He was formerly executive vice president and general manager of FYI Network and executive vice president of 45th & Dean, a multiplatform video and audio storytelling hub, at A+E Networks.

== Education ==
Greenberg graduated from St. Albans School in Washington, D.C. in 1986 and graduated from Columbia College in 1990 with a bachelor's degree. He also received an MBA from Columbia Business School in 1997.

== Career ==
For his work with TV Guide Digital, Greenberg was named to the Hollywood Reporter's Digital Power 2009 list of top 50 new-media executives.

In 2010, Greenberg signed on with Time Inc. as Digital Lifestyle President, taking over 10 website properties including Real Simple and Health.com. He spent just over seven months at Time before leaving to become CEO of CollegeHumor, a comedy website, which he joined in October 2010 to lead web, social, TV, and mobile efforts. He left CollegeHumor to become the CEO of fashion magazine Nylon in 2014. Prior to his move to Nylon, Greenberg was president of SFX Entertainment.
