= Leslie Sykes =

American journalist

- Born: June 27, 1965 (age 61); San Diego California, U.S.
- Education: Spelman College
- Occupation: News Anchor
- Employer(s): KABC-TV, Channel 7
- Spouse: Patrick W. Spann
- Children: 1 child

Leslie Ann Sykes (born June 27, 1965) is an American television news anchor, journalist and reporter. Sykes was the morning co-anchor of the Eyewitness News at KABC-TV, ABC's owned and operated television station in Los Angeles until her retirement on September 23, 2025.

== Early life ==
Leslie Ann Sykes was born in San Diego, California to Abel Baxton Sykes, Jr. (June 1, 1934 – December 19, 2012) and Sylvia Mae Thierry Sykes (November 28, 1936 – July 5, 2021). She has two older sisters; Dawn Carol Sykes and Daphne Grace Sykes. She grew up in Compton, California, where her father worked as an administrator for Compton Community College. Sykes attended St. Joseph High School (Lakewood, California) and then went to Spelman College in Atlanta, Georgia where she majored and has a degree in English. While there, she made her film debut as "Miss Mission" in Spike Lee's 1988 film, School Daze.

== Career ==
Upon graduation, Sykes began her professional career as a journalist. One of her first jobs was as a general assignment reporter at the now defunct Los Angeles Herald-Examiner. An internship followed at local independent television station (now MyNetworkTV owned-and-operated station) KCOP-TV. This led to a desk assistant position in the news department at Fox owned-and-operated station KTTV.

Her big break came when she landed her first on-air job in Hattiesburg, Mississippi at WDAM-TV. There she served as a reporter, anchored three shows a day, and produced a newscast. From there she received her first major market assignment at WVUE-TV in New Orleans, Louisiana. In December 1994, Sykes returned to Los Angeles as a general assignment reporter for KABC-TV's Eyewitness News program.

In late 1998, Sykes was approached by WBBM-TV in Chicago to become its new top female weekend anchor, replacing Sarah Lucero. However, a December 3, 1998 article in the Chicago Sun-Times reported that She had opted "to stay put in L.A."

In June 1999, Sykes was promoted to co-anchor the weekend edition of the Eyewitness News. In 2009, she was promoted again to co-anchor of the 11am-Noon slot and then joined the team on Eyewitness News This Morning as well.

On September 23, 2025, Leslie Sykes signed off from the Eyewitness News desk after more than 30 years with ABC’s Los Angeles affiliate, KABC-TV.

== Personal life ==
Sykes is married to Patrick W. Spann. They have a son and currently live in the View Park-Windsor Hills neighborhood of Los Angeles.
