= Arthur and the Invisibles (video game) =

2007 video game

- PAL region cover art.
- Developers: Etranges Libellules; Neko Entertainment (DS); Mistic Software (GBA)
- Publisher: Atari
- Composers: Fabrice Bouillon-LaForest, Raphaël Gesqua (DS)
- Platforms: Microsoft Windows, PlayStation 2, Game Boy Advance, PlayStation Portable, Nintendo DS
- Release: PlayStation 2: FRA: November 17, 2006; NA: January 9, 2007; EU: February 2, 2007; AU: January 2007; Nintendo DS: FRA: December 14, 2006; NA: January 9, 2007; EU: February 2, 2007; AU: January 2007; Game Boy Advance: FRA: December 15, 2006; NA: January 9, 2007; EU: February 2, 2007; AU: January 2007; PlayStation Portable: EU: January 9, 2007; AU: February 2, 2007; FRA: February 23, 2007; Windows: FRA: November 17, 2006; NA: January 12, 2007; EU: February 2, 2007; AU: January 2007
- Genres: Adventure, arcade
- Mode: Single-player

Arthur and the Invisibles (French: Arthur et les Minimoys) is three video games based on the 2006 French film Arthur and the Minimoys by Luc Besson. It retained the original name of the movie in Europe. The game involves Arthur and his two friends, Selenia and Bétamèche, on their mission to save the Minimoys' world from destruction. The game incorporates Besson's Minimoy universe and its inhabitants.

== Gameplay ==
Gameplay revolves around the teamwork of the trio (Arthur, Selenia and Bétamèche): players can progress by combining the three characters' skills. These skills are expanded upon as the game progresses, ranging from detectors that allow to find the game's collectibles (Bétamèche), upgrading Selenia's dagger to The Sword of Power, and allowing Arthur to remove shields equipped by some enemies. A common puzzle throughout the game involves stacking pieces of a standing stone, called a "Flagstone", in order to open doors. Players also get the chance to stack on top of a Mogoth to cross razor-sharp stone pathways, as well as ride among monstrously huge spiders and ladybugs in order to access some areas.

The DS game of the game consists of playing a series of mini-games and raising pet mul-muls that can interact with those from other people's games.

== Reception ==
Reception

Aggregate scores
Aggregator	Score				
Aggregator	DS	GBA	PC	PS2	PSP
GameRankings	62.17%	36.50%	68.42%	65.48%	N/A
Metacritic	61/100	N/A	65/100	66/100	N/A

Review scores
Publication	Score				
Publication	DS	GBA	PC	PS2	PSP
Eurogamer	N/A	N/A	N/A	6/10	N/A
Game Informer	N/A	N/A	N/A	6.8/10	N/A
GameSpot	7/10	3.2/10	7/10	N/A	N/A
GameZone	4.0/10	4.1/10	7.7/10	8.0/10	N/A
IGN	6/10	N/A	N/A	7.5/10	N/A
NGamer	59%	N/A	N/A	N/A	N/A

The PlayStation 2 and PC game received somewhat favorable reviews. The DS game had mixed reviews, with its poorer graphics and comparatively easier gameplay. The Game Boy Advance game got poor reviews across the board, criticized for its poor graphics and soundtrack, extremely easy gameplay, and lack of content compared to the other versions. The PSP version did not receive much attention, due to its low production and the fact that its North American release was cancelled.
