= Cinnabar Theater =

Theater in Petaluma, California, US

The Cinnabar Theater, located in Petaluma, California, is a professional non-profit theater producing opera and musical theatre, drama and a chamber music series under the auspices of the Cinnabar Arts Corporation. The venue is also home to the Young Repertory Theater (founded in 1983), the longest running and largest youth performing arts program in Sonoma County.

== History ==
The theater, a 1908 schoolhouse, was purchased by Marvin Klebe (1935–1999) and his wife and love Jan Klebe in 1970 as a venue to produce opera and musical theater. The Klebes converted it into a theater with much family and community help including the talents of Marvin's San Francisco Opera Company colleague, soprano Sylvia Davis (1937-).

Cinnabar Theater opened in 1972.

Marvin Klebe was an operatic baritone who appeared in three roles with the San Francisco Opera's Spring Opera Theater during the 1963 and 1967 seasons and in the U.S. premiere of Gunther Schuller's The Visitation in 1967 at the War Memorial Opera House.

In 1986, Nina Shuman (1954–2010) joined the company as music director and conductor. The daughter of Juilliard trombone professor Davis Shuman (who commissioned and premiered works by Ernest Bloch, Vincent Persichetti, Darius Milhaud, Tibor Serly, and Henry Cowell in addition to playing principal trombone with the American Symphony Orchestra), Shuman had studied conducting with Murry Sidlin at the Aspen Music Festival. She led the Cinnabar Opera Theater in over thirty-five opera productions, including the 2010 West Coast premiere of Tobias Picker's Emmeline in addition to conducting productions for Lamplighters Music Theatre, Boise Opera and as music director of the Harrower Summer Opera Workshop at the University of Georgia.

In 1988, Shuman and Klebe created the Petaluma Summer Music Festival as part of the Cinnabar Arts Corporation, in addition to developing the Cinnabar Chamber Singers and the Cinnabar Choral Ensemble. The theater has also served as a home for dancer/choreographer Ann Woodhead's Mercury Moving Company and the experimental Quicksilver Theater Company under the leadership of Richard Blake.

Their former conductor, Mary Chun (who also serves as conductor of San Francisco's new music ensemble Earplay), has led performances for Hawaii Opera Theatre and served on the conducting staffs of San Francisco Opera, the Los Angeles Music Center Opera, The Opera Theatre of Saint Louis, Belgium's La Monnaie, the Théâtre du Châtelet in Paris and the Opéra de Lyon, where she was also the director of musical studies for Music Director Kent Nagano. She has conducted Cinnabar productions of She Loves Me (2011), Don Giovanni (2012), Carmen (2013), The Marriage of Figaro (2014), and others.

Notable among the many dramatic works produced at Cinnabar was a 2004 production of Tony Kushner's The Illusion (1988) adapted from L’Illusion Comique by 17th-century French playwright Pierre Corneille. The Cinnabar production featured actor Jeffrey Weissman. In 2013, Broadway veteran and film/television actor Charles Siebert played the role of Gregory Solomon in the Cinnabar production of Arthur Miller's The Price.

In 2024, Cinnabar Theater announced plans to build a new venue located at the Petaluma Village Premium Outlet Mall. While the theater is in construction, Cinnabar will be performing their 2024/25 season at Sonoma State University.
