= Arthur 3: The War of the Two Worlds =

- Theatrical release poster
- French: Arthur 3 : La Guerre des deux mondes
- Directed by: Luc Besson
- Written by: Luc Besson; Céline Garcia
- Based on: Arthur and the War of Two Worlds by Luc Besson
- Produced by: Luc Besson; Stéphane Lecomte; Emmanuel Prévost
- Starring: Freddie Highmore; Selena Gomez; Doug Rand; Lou Reed; Iggy Pop; Mia Farrow; Ron Crawford
- Cinematography: Thierry Arbogast
- Music by: Éric Serra
- Production companies: EuropaCorp; TF1 Films Production; Apipoulaï Prod; Avalanche Productions; Canal+
- Distributed by: EuropaCorp
- Release date: 13 October 2010
- Running time: 101 minutes
- Country: France
- Language: English
- Budget: €65 million (US$85 million)
- Box office: $30.7 million

Arthur 3: The War of the Two Worlds (French: Arthur 3: La Guerre des deux mondes) is a 2010 English-language French live-action/animated fantasy adventure comedy film directed and co-written by Luc Besson, based on the fourth and final book of the Arthur children's books series by Besson. It is the sequel to Arthur and the Revenge of Maltazard (2009) and the third installment in the Arthur film series. The film was shot back-to-back with the previous installment. It is the last installment in the main series.

Arthur 3: The War of the Two Worlds was released theatrically in France on 13 October 2010 by EuropaCorp. The film received mixed reviews from critics but was a box-office success in France. However, following the box-office bombs of its two predecessors internationally, the film generated huge losses for EuropaCorp. It was released as a direct-to-video in the United States by 20th Century Fox Home Entertainment, while in the United Kingdom and Ireland, it was edited as one film with the second film under the title Arthur and the Great Adventure. The film marked Lou Reed's last acting role before his death in 2013.

A spin-off, Arthur, malédiction, was released in France in 2022.

== Plot ==
Picking up after the second film, Maltazard has assumed human size, and left Arthur in miniature. Accompanied by Princess Selenia and her brother, Prince Betameche, Arthur attempts to retrieve an enlarging potion from his house, which Maltazard seizes to enlarge his followers.

Arthur returns to human form using an Elixir of Life given by a queen bee. Archibald convinces Darkos, Maltazard's son, to change sides, and enlarges him with a second potion. Arthur and Darkos then confront Maltazard, until Selenia and Betameche shrink Maltazard back to his Minimoy size and Arthur captures him, while the U.S. Army overcome Maltazard's forces. Maltazard thereafter remains a prisoner of Arthur's family.

== Cast ==
Live-action cast

- Freddie Highmore as Arthur Montgomery. Highmore also voices Arthur in CGI animation.
- Mia Farrow as Daisy Suchot
- Ron Crawford as Archibald Suchot. The character is voiced by actor Michel Duchaussoy in the French version.
- Robert Stanton as Armand Montgomery. The character is voiced by actor Jean-Paul Rouve in the French version.
- Penny Balfour as Rose Montgomery. The character is voiced by actress Frédérique Bel in the French version.
- Jean Betote Njamba as the chief of the Matassalai.
- Cooper Daniels as George Lucas
- Steve Routman as Dr. Stitch
- Norman Stokle as the mayor
- Dashiell Eaves as Deputy Sheriff Simon Suchot
- Richard William Davis as Maltazard's human disguise
- Antony Hickling as Douglas the fireman

Voice cast

- Selena Gomez as Princess Selenia. The character is voiced by singer Mylène Farmer in the French version.
- Doug Rand as Prince Betameche. The character is voiced by radio host Cartman in the French version. Rand also voices a Clerk in the movie.
- Lou Reed as Maltazard. The character is voiced by actor Gérard Darmon in the French version.
- Iggy Pop as Prince Darkos. Pop replaces Christian Erickson, who voiced the character in the first film. The character is voiced by actor Marc Lavoine in the French version.
- David Gasman as Emperor Sifrat XVI. Gasman also voices the Bogo Chief.

== Production ==
The budget of the film is 68.83 million euros, which makes it at that time the 3rd most expensive French film in history, just ahead of the previous film in the saga.

The film was shot in Normandy, simultaneously with the previous film.

== Reception ==
In France, the film received a mixed to favourable reception. It obtained an average rating of 2,9/5 on the Allociné site, which lists twelve press titles.

On the American website Rotten Tomatoes the film has an approval rating of 20% based on reviews from 5 critics.

David Nusiar of Reelfilm.com called the film "a mild improvement over its two predecessors" and gave it a score of 2 out of 5.
