= Our Feature Presentation =

- Directed by: Gardner Loulan
- Written by: Joseph Brady; Gardner Loulan
- Produced by: Gavin Heslet; G. Lewis Heslet; JoAnn Loulan
- Starring: Chad Eschman; Diane Tasca; Ron Crawford; Liam Brady; Jeffrey Weissman; Craig Lewis; Dustin Diamond; Erin Cahill
- Cinematography: Dan Schmeltzer
- Edited by: Joseph Dillingham
- Music by: Haley Mancini
- Distributed by: Aunt Colony
- Release date: 2008
- Country: United States
- Language: English

Our Feature Presentation is a 2008 independent comedy film directed by Gardner Loulan and written by Gardner Loulan and Joseph Brady.

== Production ==
Our Feature Presentation is a low-budget independent film. Cast and crew include many professionals and volunteers. The director is Gardner Loulan who is a host for NBC's show 1st Look. During production Gardner was a VJ and writer on the MTV college station, MTVU. The entire film was cast and shot in 2006 in Palo Alto, California: auditions for cast were held April 28–30; callbacks were on May 13–14; pre-production began May 15; principal filming began June 15 and wrapped on July 15. Post-production was done in New York City and the film had its theatrical premiere in Atherton, California on December 21, 2008.

== Plot ==
Cody Weever (played by Chad Eschman) grew up a child who loved films and yearned to make one with the help of his doting grandfather Alexander Weever (Ron Crawford), a former Hollywood star. His mother (Diane Tasca), an irascible self-made billionaire, refuses to fund Cody's project, leaving him resentful yet determined. At the same time, and much to his dismay, an unconfirmed rumor begins to spread in Cody's small affluent town of Buck Valley that the beautiful but untalented Hollywood star and salt fortune heiress Jasmine Danell (Christina Rosenberg) wants to star in Cody's film in order to make her current lover and famed French-Canadian director LeStat LeChaton (Craig Lewis), jealous. The residents of town react to the news by confronting Cody, and one by one lobbying to be a part of the film. His ego and ambition overpower Cody, and he allows the people of the town to distract and corrupt his initial vision. Jasmine stars in his film, and Cody's brother auctions the directorial role to LeChaton much to Cody's dismay. Finally, and after significant personal compromise, with his production usurped and his unprofessional cast and crew, Cody attempts to sabotage his set only to realize it has taken on a life of its own.

== Partial cast ==
- Chad Eschman as Cody Weever
- Ron Crawford as Alexander Weever
- Jeffrey Weissman ... Hugo Wilmington
- Dustin Diamond as Mr. Renolds
- Erin Cahill as Mrs. Renolds
- Elissa Stebbins as Finny Wong
- Diane Tasca as Helen Weever
- Craig Lewis as Lestat LeChaton
- Liam Brady as Kenneth Weever
- Christina Rosenberg as Jasmine Danell
- Maggie VandenBerghe as Sam Biscotti
- Haley Mancini as Michelle Biscotti
- Karen Hager as Judy Templeton
- Brandon Alexander as Bobby Roberts
- Kellen Breen as Shirtless Gardner No. 2
- Scott Knapp as Shirtless Gardner No. 4
