= Arthur and the Revenge of Maltazard =

- Theatrical release poster
- French: Arthur et la Vengeance de Maltazard
- Directed by: Luc Besson
- Written by: Luc Besson; Céline Garcia
- Based on: Arthur and the Revenge of Maltazard by Luc Besson
- Produced by: Luc Besson; Stéphane Lecomte; Emmanuel Prévost
- Starring: Freddie Highmore; Selena Gomez; Doug Rand; Lou Reed; Mia Farrow; Ron Crawford; Snoop Dogg; will.i.am; Fergie
- Cinematography: Thierry Arbogast
- Edited by: Julien Rey
- Music by: Éric Serra
- Production companies: EuropaCorp; TF1 Films Production; Apipoulaï Prod; Avalanche Productions; Canal+
- Distributed by: EuropaCorp
- Release date: 2 December 2009
- Running time: 93 minutes
- Country: France
- Language: English
- Budget: €65 million
- Box office: $78.5 million

Arthur and the Revenge of Maltazard (French: Arthur et la Vengeance de Maltazard) is a 2009 English-language French live-action/animated fantasy adventure film directed and co-written by Luc Besson, based on the third book of the Arthur children's books series by Besson. It is the sequel to Arthur and the Minimoys (2006), and the second installment in the Arthur film series.

Arthur and the Revenge of Maltazard was released theatrically in France on 2 December 2009 by EuropaCorp. The film received mixed reviews from critics in France and was received negatively outside France. Like its predecessor, it was a box-office success in France but was a box-office bomb internationally. It was released direct-to-video in the United States by 20th Century Fox Home Entertainment, while in the United Kingdom and Ireland, it was edited as one film with the third film under the title Arthur and the Great Adventure. As a result, the film generated huge losses for EuropaCorp.

A sequel, titled Arthur 3: The War of the Two Worlds and shot back-to-back, was released in 2010 in France.

== Plot ==
It is 1962, two years after Arthur Montgomery saved his grandparents’ home and saved the Minimoys from the evil Maltazard. Arthur stays with his grandparents for the holidays, during which the Bogo Matassalai (a fictitious African society) assign Arthur a series of tests, including camouflage and environmental nonviolence. Having passed these tests, Arthur prepares to see the Minimoys to celebrate, until his father decides to take him and his mother back to the metropolis.

When a spider gives Arthur a grain of rice containing a distress call, which he believes has come from the Minimoys, he returns to his grandparents' house, where the Bogo Matassalai's attempt to give him Minimoy stature through a telescope fails, and they instead wrap him in ropes of increasing tightness until he falls as a drop of sap into the Minimoy Max's bar.

En route to investigate the Minimoys' condition, Arthur and Max rescue Betameche, who leads Arthur to the King. He then learns that Selenia is held captive by Maltazard, who is inspired to invade the human world by increasing his own size. Maltazard tricks the Minimoys into completing his design. The telescope itself is destroyed in the process, leaving Arthur trapped at his Minimoy size, while Maltazard is free to roam the world.

== Cast ==
Live-action cast

- Freddie Highmore as Arthur Montgomery. Highmore also voices Arthur in CGI animation.
- Mia Farrow as Daisy Suchot
- Ron Crawford as Archibald Suchot. The character is voiced by actor Michel Duchaussoy in the French version.
- Robert Stanton as Armand Montgomery. Stanton replaced Doug Rand, who played the character in the first film. The character is voiced by actor Jean-Paul Rouve in the French version.
- Penny Balfour as Rose Montgomery. The character is voiced by actress Frédérique Bel in the French version, replacing Valérie Lemercier.
- Jean Betote Njamba as the chief of the Matassalai.

Voice cast

- Selena Gomez as Princess Selenia. Gomez replaced singer Madonna, who voiced the character in the first film. The character is voiced by singer Mylène Farmer in the French version.
- Doug Rand as Prince Betameche. The character is voiced by radio host Nicolas Bonaventure Ciattoni in the French version.
- Snoop Dogg as Max. The character is voiced by rapper Rohff in the French version.
- will.i.am as Snow. The character is voiced by actor Omar Sy in the French version.
- Fergie as Replay. The character is voiced by actor Fred Testot in the French version.
- David Gasman as Emperor Sifrat XVI. Gasman replaced Robert De Niro, who voiced the character in the first film. He also voiced the mechanic and the Bogo Chief.
- Barbara Weber Scaff as Miss Perlanapple
- Alan Fairbanks as Pump Attendant
- Logan Miller as Jake
- Leslie Clack as Ferryman
- Alan Wenger as Mono Cyclop/DaVinci
- Jerry di Giacomo as Proscuitto/Guard
- Paul Bandey as Miro/Unicorn Chief
- Lou Reed as Maltazard. Reed replaced singer David Bowie, who voiced the character in the first film. The character is voiced by actor Gérard Darmon in the French version, replacing Alain Bashung.

== Production ==
=== Development ===
Luc Besson said that the character of Arthur was meant to grow up alongside the film's audience, as had been done with the Harry Potter series, and that giving characters a past allowed them to be written with more maturity.

=== Role assignment ===
While Douglas Rand played Arthur's father in Arthur and the Invisibles, the role is reprised in this film and the next by Robert Stanton. Furthermore, Yann Loubatière replaces Barbara Kelsch for the French voice of Arthur. On the American voice side, Lou Reed replaces David Bowie for the voice of Maltazard while David Gasman succeeds Robert De Niro for that of the King of Minimoys. Likewise on the French side for Maltazard, the voice is taken over by Gérard Darmon after the death of Alain Bashung.

=== Filming ===
The filming of the live action scenes was done simultaneously with those of the following film, Arthur 3: The War of the Two Worlds, because Luc Besson wanted to prevent the young actor Freddie Highmore from growing up too much between the two films.

As with the first film, it was Normandie that Arthur's village located in Connecticut was recreated, but this time on nearly 40,000 square meters. Luc Besson and production designer Hugues Tissandier created settings that did not appear in the first film: a church, shops, a supermarket, a garage, a hardware store, a police station, a cinema and a fountain, etc.

== Distribution outside France ==
Following the intensive negative reactions from the cuts of Arthur and the Minimoys, The Weinstein Company would not distribute this sequel or the next one. It was instead distributed by 20th Century Fox. Unlike its predecessor, no scenes were cut or changed for the US release. However, it was edited in the UK and Ireland by combining it with the next sequel into one film under the title Arthur and the Great Adventure. Also, neither of the American actors that re-dubbed the original dialogues in Minimoys would repeat this due to Weinstein not partaking any distribution of the Arthur sequels.

The Japanese release would only change the theme song to be "Uh Uh" by IMALU.

== Reception ==
=== Reviews ===
In France, the film obtained an average rating of 3.1/5 on the AlloCiné site, which lists 17 press titles.

The film was very poorly received by the press in the United States. On American aggregator Rotten Tomatoes the film has an approval rating of 14% based on reviews from 7 critics, with an average rating of 4/10.

== Video game ==
To promote the film, two video games by Ubisoft were released for PlayStation 3, Microsoft Windows, Nintendo Wii and Nintendo DS. The games compose of mostly minigames and cutscenes which are loosely related to the plot of the film.

== Sequel ==
In 2010, a sequel titled Arthur 3: The War of the Two Worlds was released.
