= List of Yaiba: Samurai Legend characters =

The Yaiba: Samurai Legend manga series features an extensive cast of characters created by Gosho Aoyama.

== Yaiba's Group ==
=== Yaiba Kurogane ===
Voiced by: Minami Takayama (Japanese); Erica Mendez (English)
Yaiba Kurogane (鉄 刃, Kurogane Yaiba) is the Thunder God incarnate, and later acquires the legendary Dragon's Orb. Since he fights without the Thunder Orb in the socketed Thunder God's sword, he was spared the same fate of being possessed by the sword's owner that had befallen Onimaru. Aside from his skills with the sword and his keen senses, he is also able to converse with animals.
For some time, Yaiba was fighting without any orbs. While this left him vulnerable because he had no divine assistance, it also let him master several techniques: the Senpūken (せんぷう剣; Whirlwind Sword), in which he spins the sword like a lawnmower blade by twirling it with his fingers in the hole where the orbs would usually go in; the Kaminari Giri (かみなり斬り; Lightning Cut), in which he executes a downward slash in a furious zigzag pattern, and finally; the Kazaguruma (風車; Windmill Slash), in which he executes a full-body vertical spin in the air by sticking his sword between his feet, using the momentum to create a buzzsaw-like effect.
Another technique, "The Wave of Wind Thunder", can only be used along with Takeshi Onimaru, for both Thunder God and Devil Wind Swords are needed in order to execute this technique. It is the resulting combination of Yaiba's "Lightning Blast" and Takeshi's upgraded Devil Wind Slash "Tornado Ripper". They used this move against Kaguya-hime.
Personality-wise, Yaiba is a carefree, happy-go lucky, yet reckless individual who often acts as somewhat of a goofball when training, but is surprisingly clever and persistent.

=== Sayaka Mine ===
Voiced by: Kotono Mitsuishi (1993 series), Manaka Iwami (2025 series) (Japanese); Rebecca Wang (English)
Sayaka Mine (峰 さやか, Mine Sayaka) is Yaiba's unlikely love interest. She originally had not intended to join Yaiba's journey, and simply found herself tied to Kagetora with Yaiba going towards the Thunder God's sword when she woke up. Later it is revealed that she is the Dragon Maiden incarnate, the key to Kaguya's true form.

=== Kenjuro Kurogane ===
Voiced by: Bin Shimada (1993 series), Katsuyuki Konishi (2025 series) (Japanese); Craig Lee Thomas (English)
Kenjuro Kurogane (鉄 剣十郎, Kurogane Kenjūrō) is Yaiba's father. He was only shown in one episode of Yaiba in the anime, whereas in the manga he accompanies Yaiba to Tokyo. He doesn't stay very long, though, but occasionally comes back to check up on Yaiba.

=== Musashi Miyamoto ===
Voiced by: Masaharu Satō (1993 series), Junichi Suwabe (2025 series) (Japanese); Christopher Corey Smith (English)
Musashi Miyamoto (宮本 武蔵, Miyamoto Musashi) is the legendary 400-year-old samurai Musashi took it upon himself to guard the Thunder God sword and lived as a hermit quite near it (although this is puzzling considering that the Thunder God's sword itself electrocutes all unworthy of it). Since his time on the mountain, he has taught one student and started using two swords due to old age. Like all old men, he is lecherous. He serves as Yaiba's teacher, especially upon controlling the Thunder Orb.

=== Kojiro Sasaki ===
Voiced by: Jūrōta Kosugi (1993 series), Gō Inoue (2025 series) (Japanese); Howard Wang (English)
Kojiro Sasaki (佐々木 小次郎, Sasaki Kojirō) has been dead for a long time, having been defeated, killed in a duel and buried by Musashi himself. However, he was given new life by Onimaru, through Spiderman's reviving Ritual (or rather, it was the stench coming from the foul-smelling ingredients used for the reviving ceremony that brought Kojiro back, as well as the Hakki's facial slapping), on the condition that he kill Yaiba. After getting beaten by Yaiba while using the Thunder Orb, he then becomes friends with them in order to beat them. Kojiro uses an enchanted sword (Washing Pole as he calls it) that grows longer on his whim, and thus the maximum length that the sword can attain is limited only by Kojiro's imagination. It doesn't seem to be particularly durable as the other mystical swords shown in the series, since various characters (even those with no mystical powers or weapons to begin with) have been known to cut the sword all the way down to the guard with apparent ease. Thankfully, Kojiro's sword's ability allows it to recover the severed blade simply by lengthening itself indefinitely. Perhaps the sword's only true weakness is the fact that it is very sensitive to salt water (even to teardrops); even a slight splash will cause it to spontaneously lengthen against Kojiro's will, making it inadvisable to use in a battle where a large body of salty water happens to be nearby. He is also a natural playboy – one of the series' many running gags. Kojiro usually needs to be manhandled by others in order to "help" him subdue his overwhelming idiocy. Despite this, he serves as one of the shows more prominent sword fighters in the series

=== Jubei Yagyu ===
Voiced by: Takaya Hashi (1993 series), Hidenori Takahashi (2025 series) (Japanese); Mick Lauer (English)
Jubei Yagyu (柳生 十兵衛, Yagyū Jūbei) was revived by Onimaru and defeated Kojiro Sasaki by kicking Kojiro's overextended sword straight down to Sayaka Mine's house. Before he defeated Yaiba, Musashi yelled at him and withdrew himself from attacking to join with Yaiba's group. What Onimaru didn't know about is that he is Musashi's disciple. He tends to be suicidal, as he always attempts to commit seppuku if he commits an error or feels that he did something dishonorable. When Jubei got drunk thanks to Musashi, who forcibly makes him drink sake (Japanese rice wine), Onimaru takes advantage of the situation and summons a demon while he's in a drunken state to turn him into a werewolf which has the same skills (albeit heightened to a degree) like a normal Jubei but is murderous and loves drinking sake. He can revert to Jubei when he's knocked out cold, but when he gets drunk again, he'll change into a werewolf.

=== Kagetora ===
Voiced by: Hisao Egawa (1993 series), Isshin Chiba (2025 series) (Japanese); Kellen Goff (English)
Kagetora (カゲトラ) is Yaiba's friend tiger. He helps Yaiba with his training and lets Yaiba ride him when speed is needed. He is also shown a much higher intelligence than Yaiba when it comes to rock-scissors-paper. He was probably found on the same mountain where Yaiba and his father lived.

=== Shonosuke ===
Voiced by: Ryō Horikawa (1993 series), Kōsuke Echigoya (2025 series) (Japanese); Steve Prince (English)
Shonosuke (庄之助, Shōnosuke) is Yaiba's friend's vulture. He helps Yaiba with his training and lets Yaiba ride him when he needs to fly. Like Kagetora, he occasionally ups Yaiba. He was probably found on the same mountain Yaiba and his father lived.

=== Gerozaemon Geroda ===
Voiced by: Kazunari Tanaka (1993 series), Takeharu Ōnishi (2025 series) (Japanese); Kyle Hebert (English)
Gerozaemon Geroda (ゲロ田 ゲロ左衛門, Geroda Gerozaemon) is the frog demon Gerozaimon is the first of Onimaru's demons to attack Yaiba, and was beaten by him when Yaiba called for his snake friends. When the second demon came and informed him he was to be disposed due to his uselessness, Gerozaimon was befriended by Yaiba. He uses his axe in battle. He also shows how good his tongue is against a battle with the chameleon demon. In the anime, his speech pattern forces him to either begin or end any sentence with "Gero" (ゲロ), which is Japanese for "Ribbit". In the manga, he is shown to be somewhat easily depressed, having fallen to a state of despair after Snakeman told him that Onimaru already gave up on him. As a result, Gerozaimon brutally beats up the Kuro Oni who came with Snakeman in blind despair.

=== Mr. Sea Cucumber ===
Voiced by: Tsutomu Kashiwakura (1993 series), Kana Ichinose (2025 series) (Japanese); Xanthe Huynh (English)
Mr. Sea Cucumber (ナマコ男, Namako-Otoko; lit. "Sea cucumber Man"), like Gerozaimon, he used to be one of Onimaru's demons. On his way to Izu he gets lost and is found by Yaiba's group. From then on he is always with them, usually seen on Sayaka's shoulder. He usually ends his sentences with "Zura" (ズラ).

=== Moroha Kurogane ===
Moroha Kurogane (鉄 諸羽, Kurogane Moroha) is Yaiba's little sister. Because she was raised to believe Kenjuro is her mother's enemy, she has been training in the way of the sword to defeat him. She joins Yaiba's group for the final arc and speaks very bluntly.

=== Nadeshiko Yamato ===
Voiced by: Sayaka Senbongi (Japanese); Suzie Yeung (English)
Nadeshiko Yamato (大和 撫子, Yamato Nadeshiko) is a girl that Yaiba helped in the jungle when she was attacked by an animal. After that, she fell in love with him and made a promise to marry him. Yaiba accidentally agreed if she's stronger (Yaiba thought she is a daughter of a Soba's seller). After she got stronger, she came to the Mine dojo and asked for a fight, defeating Musashi and Kojiro. Jubei didn't want to fight her because he fell for her. She finally left to get even stronger. In the 2025 anime adaptation, she also serves as one of the main supporting characters of the series and joins Yaiba's group as well.

== Onimaru Faction ==
=== Takeshi Onimaru ===
Voiced by: Ryō Horikawa (1993 series), Yoshimasa Hosoya (2025 series) (Japanese); Alan Lee (English)
Takeshi Onimaru (鬼丸 猛, Onimaru Takeshi) is a skilled swordsman and rival of Yaiba, later aligning with him during the Kaguya conflict. After their initial duel ends inconclusively, Onimaru trains relentlessly, discovering a hidden chamber containing the Thunder God and Devil Wind swords. Wielding the latter, he transforms into the Devil Wind incarnate, gaining demonic horns. He later relinquishes the Devil Wind sword to Yaiba upon obtaining the Mao-Ken blade. Onimaru briefly seizes control of Japan by manipulating the Diet, which accounts for the lack of interference during his battles. His followers are horned, shadowy humanoids.

=== Mr. Spider ===
Voiced by: Tetsuo Sakaguchi (1993 series), Shūhei Sakaguchi (2025 series) (Japanese); Alenjendro Saab (English)
Mr. Spider (クモ男, Kumo-Otoko; lit. "Spider Man") is the third of Onimaru's Hakki, he become something of a sidekick to Onimaru, who often sends him to others whom he instructed Spiderman to revive to attack Yaiba and his friends. He is also arguably the most comedic Hakki shown in the series. He calculates the expenses of financing high technological projects, usually with an old-fashioned abacus. In the anime, he sometimes uses a calculator with several features. His one true flaw is the fact that he's easily intimidated by loud noises. For example: several fragile materials like beer bottles or plate breaking against the floor can render Spiderman in a state of trauma. That, along with the fact that he's very gullible with limited fighting skills make him a not-so-formidable enemy. After Onimaru becomes carbonated, he comes to live with Yaiba while loyally polishing his master. He speaks with a Kansai dialect.

== Hakki Arc ==
Onimaru's Hakki (八鬼; 8 Demons) are 8 demon souls reborn into the bodies of dead animals. Gerozaimon, Namako-Otoko, and Kumo-Otoko are among their ranks. While each of them have their own unique fighting skill and abilities, all of them are also downright comedic – a continuous running gag in the series.

Mr. Snake (ヘビ男, Hebi-Otoko; lit. "Snake Man")
Voiced by: Ken Yamaguchi (1993 series), Takayuki Nakatsukasa (2025 series), Emi Shinohara (1993 series), Rena Maeda (2025 series) (Human disguise) (Japanese); Michael Schwalbe (English)
The second assassin sent after Yaiba. He fights with a hoko yari from a powerful snake god. Being a sentient reptile, he is also the fellow Hakki most feared by Gerozaimon, which is appropriate since snakes are the natural enemies of frogs. He is defeated by Yaiba's Senpūken technique.
Mr. Starfish (ヒトデ男, Hitode-Otoko; lit. "Starfish Man")
Voiced by: Wataru Takagi (1993 series), Genta Nakamura (2025 series) (Japanese); Brent Mukai (English)
A large male starfish from Kumamoto who thinks of himself as the leader of his group. He is married with a son and runs a dining hall. He speaks with a Kumamoto dialect. He encounters Yaiba's group again and helps them retrieve the Fire Orb from Mount Aso, nearly dying in the attempt.
Mr. Mantis (カマキリ男, Kamakiri-Otoko; lit. "Mantis Man")
Voiced by: Michio Nakao (Japanese); Kellen Goff (English)
Sent with Hitode-Otoko and Namako-Otoko to stop Yaiba. After their many failures, they each get homesick and return to their respective hometowns. He speaks with a Nagoya dialect.
Mr. Slug (ナメクジ男, Namekuji-Otoko; lit. "Slug Man")
Voiced by: Tsutomu Kashiwakura (1993 series), Shinya Takahashi (2025 series) (Japanese); Derek Stephen Prince (English)
His sticky body made him a tough opponent, but he is defeated when Yaiba throws a salt package over him and cuts it open with the Senpūken, causing him to shrivel up. He puts on a shell to become Mr. Snail (かたつむり男, Katatsumuri-Otoko; lit. "Snail Man") and challenges Yaiba to a rematch, but meets the same fate once again.
Batman (バットマン, Battoman)
Voiced by: Hirohiko Kakegawa (1993 series), Kazuyuki Okitsu (2025 series) Kayleigh McKee (English)
Often speaks in English and greatly admires Musashi. His weakness is sunlight. He is a master swordsman and the strongest of the Hakki but is also defeated by Yaiba's Senpūken technique. During Yaiba's attack on Onimaru Castle, he is revived by Kumo-Otoko, but Yaiba defeats him with a single lightning strike. In the anime he was renamed Mr. Bat (バットガイ, Battogai; lit. "Batguy").

== Onimaru's Shitennō Arc ==
Yakitori-kun (やきとりくん)
Voiced by: Fumihiko Tachiki (1993 series), Hiroya Egashira (2025 series) (Japanese); Patrick Seitz (English)
A giant angler fish wearing a paper lantern on his lure, lives in an underground lake in Onimaru's Fortress. He tries to swallow Yaiba and his friends but is eventually tricked into smashing into a wall and is defeated by Yaiba's Kaminari Giri attack.
Chameleon Bonaparte (カメレオン·ボナパルト, Kamereon Bonaparuto)
Voiced by: Kazumi Tanaka (1993 series), Shinya Hamazoe (2025 series) (Japanese); Derek Stephen Prince (English)
A French-speaking chameleon who can change shape and color, lives in a forest inside Onimaru's Fortress. He kidnaps Kagetora, Shonosuke and Gerozaemon and turns into a copy of Yaiba to trick the group, but is eventually found out and defeated by the combined efforts of Kojiro and Yaiba.
Dorai-Dorai (ドライドライ)
Voiced by: Tesshō Genda (1993 series), Akihiro Tajima (2025 series) (Japanese); Kellen Goff (English)
A super-powered gorilla that is only the size of a doll, nearly defeats the group but is accidentally knocked out by Kojiro (who decided to side with him) and defeated by Yaiba's Kaminari Giri. He then turns into a giant rampaging gorilla but is tamed by Yaiba.
Tortoise Europa (トータスヨーロッパ, Tōtasu Yōroppa)
A giant mechanical suit operated by Spider-man, can be assembled in many ways and has many weapons, including spikes, explosive mini-turtles and chests containing ageing gas. It can also turn into a giant mechanical spider.

== Dragon God Orbs Arc ==
Professor Kanabo (金棒博士, Kanabō-hakase)
Voiced by: Hisao Egawa (1993 series), Yoshimitsu Shimoyama (2025 series) (Japanese); Steve Prince (English)
The genius professor recruited by Onimaru and Kumo-Otoko to strengthen Onimaru's Castle with the Onimaru Cannon and repair the Fūjin-ken. He serves as a quirky but loyal advisor to Onimaru. During the Kaguya arc, he builds the special flying submarine to infiltrate Kaguya's hideout and later the Wind Thunder Gods' Bazooka, a giant cannon that combines the powers of the Fujin and Raijin orbs.
Miyoshi-Seikai Nyūdō (三好 清海 入道)
Voiced by: Minoru Inaba (1993 series), Nobuyuki Hiyama (2025 series) (Japanese); Kellen Goff (English)
One of Onimaru's underlings. He is revived inside an Octopus' body and can transform into a giant Octopus. He attacks Yaiba while he's searching for the Water Orb in Lake Biwa and is eventually vanquished by Yaiba's Kaminari Giri.
Kotaro Fuma (風魔 小太郎, Fūma Kotarō)
Voiced by: Hōchū Ōtsuka (1993 series), Shinji Kawada (2025 series) (Japanese); Patrick Seitz (English)
One of Onimaru's underlings. He is revived inside a Hawk's body and can transform into a hawk-man. He attacks the group inside Mount Tsurugi in Shikoku with his ninja techniques and weapons. He nearly kills Yaiba but is defeated and forced to flee, thanks to the help of the local tanuki. He reappears later with a "new ally" to take his revenge, but is backstabbed and cut in half by Goemon.
Shiro-Tokisada Amakusa (天草 四郎時貞, Amakusa Shirō-Tokisada)
Voiced by: Toshihiko Seki (1993 series), Anri Katsu (2025 series) Y. Chang (English)
One of Onimaru's underlings. He is revived inside a Fox's body. He's a sorcerer capable of summoning weapons and animals, as well as turning himself into various things, including a tiger, an elephant and a giant Raijū. He's eventually defeated by Yaiba's Fire Orb.
Goemon Ishikawa (石川 五右衛門, Ishikawa Goemon)
Voiced by: Shōzō Iizuka (1993 series), Tomoaki Maeno (2025 series) (Japanese); Jas Patrick (English)
One of Onimaru's underlings. He is revived inside a Bear's body and can transform into a Bear-man. He first appear under the disguise of "Rokuemon Ishida", and wins the group's trust by killing Kotarō, only to steal their map. He's first fought in Osaka, where he turns the local Onimaru Castle into a giant mecha to fight against Yaiba's Big Orb and is forced to flee when the castle is destroyed. Later he steals the Darkness Orb, challenging Yaiba and his group to a battle at Kawanakajima. After a long battle during which he turns into a shuriken-wielding bear-man, he is defeated by Yaiba's Fire Orb.
Kero-kichi (ケロ吉)
Voiced by: Kappei Yamaguchi (1993 series), Hiroki Goto (2025 series) (Japanese); Kellen Goff (English)
Darkness Orb World's guide that wants some friends to play with. He is a kappa. He tries to persuade Yaiba to give up his dream, but is eventually persuaded to leave the Orb and find a dream of his own.
Kero-suke (ケロ介)
Voiced by: Shigezō Sasaoka (1993 series), Taiten Kusunoki (2025 series) (Japanese); Alenjandro Saab (English)
Darkness Orb World Exit's guard. He was defeated by Yaiba's Kazaguruma. Another kappa, but with a giant body who can spit fire and whose head is incredibly hard.
Benkei Musashibo (武蔵坊 弁慶, Musashibō Benkei)
Voiced by: Daisuke Gōri (1993 series), Tetsu Inada (2025 series) (Japanese); Kyle Hebert (English)
One of Onimaru's underlings. He is revived inside a Bull's body and can transform into a Bull-man wearing the clothes of a baseball player and a steel kanabo. He's encountered by the group in Hokkaido where he fought them for the possession of the Legendary Orb. He was defeated by Yaiba's Ice Orb and shattered by Musashi.
Basho Matsuo (松尾 芭蕉, Matsuo Bashō)
Voiced by: Takeshi Aono (1993 series), Yoji Ueda (2025 series) (Japanese); Frank Todaro (English)
One of Onimaru's underlings. He is revived inside an Ape's body and can transform into an ape-man. Rather than being a poet, Basho was actually a shinobi disguised as one. He betrayed Onimaru, wanting the power of Ryūjin's Orb for himself, and fights the group using a scythe and several magical needles that turns the victim to stone. He was defeated by Yaiba's Darkness Orb and sent into the World of darkness, where he's last seen chased around by Kerosuke.
Dragon God (龍神, Ryūjin)
Voiced by: Kōji Ishii (1993 series), Akio Otsuka (2025 series) (Japanese); Rick Zieff (English)
The guard of Ryūjin's Orb inside Mount Fuji. He is the one that tested Yaiba in order to give the power of Ryūjin. He looks like an old samurai/shogun. He reappears during the final battle against Kaguya to advise Yaiba, and seemingly vanishes when the battle is over. He reappears once more during the Yamata no Orochi arc to stop Onimaru and ends up sacrificing himself to defeat Dark.

== Kaguya Arc ==
Kaguya (かぐや)
Voiced by: Rika Fukami (1993 series), Ami Koshimizu (2025 series) (Japanese); Lauren Landa (English)
She is the second enemy of Yaiba, the Empress of the Moon and the ruler of a race of bunny people living on the moon. Unlike the other inhabitants of the Moon who are all anthropomorphic rabbits, she appears as a human dressed like a Playboy bunny. She awakens after sensing the energy of Yaiba's Dragon Orb, and launches an invasion of earth using bamboo-styled spaceships. She had conquered the world a thousand years before, but the priest of the Dragon God defeated her by cutting off her ears and sealing them within the spirit of the Dragon Priestess, and each Dragon Priestess down the line. Kaguya has many properties of a Gaki, a form of spiritual vampire, and as such, she requires the essence of young girls to maintain her youth and power. A simple kiss from Kaguya drains the youth and energy from young girls and recharges Kaguya for a time. How long depends on how much of her world-cracking energy she chooses to unleash. Kaguya has minions of her own, including a nearly limitless population of gray-furred rabbits dressed in sharp suits and sunglasses, very similar to the Yakuza-style look. They are incredibly polite, even to their captives, though they are completely loyal to Kaguya. Her true form is that of a colossal, hydra-like monster whose real face is on the "body". She eventually merges with her people and planet Earth, but is sealed by Yaiba using Ryuujin's power. She reappears during the Yamata no Orochi arc where she reluctantly helps Yaiba against Onimaru.
During one of their first encounters, Kaguya uses her "Carbon Freeze Ray", sealing Onimaru in a block of stone very similar to how Han Solo was frozen in Carbonite in Star Wars.
She was called "Princess Moon" in the Philippines' English-dubbed version.
Tsukikage (ツキカゲ; Moon Shadow)
Voiced by: Daiki Nakamura (1993 series), Koki Uchiyama (2025 series) (Japanese); Phillip Reich (English)
He is the most effective General and Shogun of the Moon Bunny forces. Tsukikage is an anthropomorphic rabbit who acts with the full authority and trust of Kaguya. Like all the Moon Rabbits, he has the power to fly, and also the power to 'Gatai', or fuse, with other objects or even other people. He is incredibly competent (which is unusual in most television shows) and tolerates Kaguya's temper tantrums with almost limitless patience. At times, Kaguya gives Tsukikage her fan, a symbol of her authority and a focus for some of her power. The fan allows Tsukikage to fire Kaguya's trademark pink energy blasts. Tsukikage only voiced a concern with one of Kaguya's orders, which was to release Gekko from imprisonment in order to combat Yaiba.
He was called "Moon Beam" in the Philippines' English-dubbed version.
Gekko (ゲッコー, Gekkō)
Voiced by: Kazuki Yao
Gekko is the only black rabbit on the Moon, Gekko was bullied as a child. The only rabbit who would stand up for him was Tsukikage, and thus formed a brotherly bond between the two. Gekko often calls Tsukikage 'Aniki', which translates roughly as 'brother'. Gekko's style of dress is similar to Tsukikage's own, and he has a scar over one eye that keeps it shut. In later episodes, his eye opens as a result of using the full power of the Mao-Ken sword. Gekko's tactics, unlike all the generals sent to stop Yaiba, are ruthless and direct. Gekko has no need for fair play and even begins his assault on Yaiba while at Sayaka's house in the middle of dinner. Once determining that Gekko cannot beat Yaiba without some degree of magical weapon, Gekko goes to "Cell Sixty Six" to unleash the Mao-Ken sword, the blade responsible for turning the Moon from a lush bamboo forest into a barren wasteland. Gekko's proficiency and power with the Mao-Ken sword force Yaiba and Onimaru to join forces to combat him. Gekko's desire for victory was so great that he was willing to kill other Moon Rabbits, though it is entirely possible that the Moon Rabbits he killed were the ones initially responsible for his imprisonment.
He was called "Moon Light" in the Philippines' English-dubbed version.
Mangetsu (マンゲツ)
Voiced by: Toshihiko Nakajima
Mangetsu is one of the Generals under Tsukikage, vying for his position. He is a huge rabbit with a sinister look to him, dressed in a different style of uniform from the other generals. This indicates that he's either a general of a different branch of the "Moon Army" that came down, or all the other generals are of a higher rank than him. He concocts a plan to deliver Yaiba to Kaguya, which fails. Mongetzu then decides to take action by assaulting Yaiba directly. The fight ends up in a seafood restaurant where Mongetzu demonstrates the 'true power of the moon people' by brandishing a lobster, then yelling "Gatai!". Once the smoke cleared, Mongetzu was now part lobster, with claws, gleaming red shell armor, and (as all Gatai forms have) big rabbit ears. The next Gatai Mongetzu attempted was with a propane tank, which gave him the power to breathe fire. Yaiba defeated him using a combination of the "Big" orb and the "Fire" orb he had earned at this point, and blasted Mongetzu clear back to the Moon Bunny base. For his failure, Kaguya disintegrated him.
Mikazuki (ミカヅキ)
Voiced by: Nobuhiko Kazama
Mikazuki is another one of Kaguya's generals. During Yaiba's attack against the Moon base he performs "Gatai" with a shark, but is defeated by Yaiba's fireball and has his ears cut, leaving him in his shark form.
Shingetsu (シンゲツ)
Voiced by: Tomohisa Asō
Shingetsu is another one of Kaguya's generals. During Yaiba's attack against the Moon base he performs "Gatai" with a giant squid, but is defeated by Yaiba and has his ears cut, leaving him in his squid form.
Hangetsu (ハンゲツ)
Voiced by: Ginzō Matsuo
Hangetsu is another one of Kaguya's generals, he performs Gatai on Jubei, taking over his body and using it to fight Yaiba, but is tricked by Musashi into drinking saké, awakening Jubei's werewolf form and being forced to leave his body. He's later blasted into pieces by Gekko.

== Pyramid Arc ==
Emerald (エメラルド, Emerarudo)
A mysterious girl that appears in front of Yaiba and guide him and Sayaka inside the Pyramid. Later, her identity is revealed that she is actually one of the guards in Pyramid, the "Defense" Soldier. She is killed by the beam of the Japan's sinker machine. She has the ability to heal and create a barrier.
Sugi Pollen Soldier (スギ花粉ソルジャー, Sugi Kafun Sorujā)
One of the guards in the Pyramid similar to an Ent. It can make the enemies cry by releasing pollen, as well as throwing poisoned leaves and wielding multiple swords. He's defeated by Yaiba's Juumonji Giri.
Ruby (ルビー, Rubī)
One of the guards in Pyramid that holds the element of power. She attacks with an axe made from light and is incredibly strong.
Sapphire (サファイア, Safaia)
One of the guards in Pyramid that holds the element of technique. She attacks with the Raijin-ken made from light and can emulate any technique she sees, even just once.
Diamond (ダイヤモンド, Daiyamondo)
One of the guards in Pyramid that holds the element of intelligence. She can predict all of her enemies' thoughts. She fights with a scythe and spikes made of energy.
Jewel (ジュエル, Jueru)
The perfect knight. He is the combination of Emerald, Ruby, Sapphire, and Diamond. So, he holds all of their powers.

== Underworld Arc ==
Gold (ゴールド, Gōrudo)
One of the two best warriors of the Underworld, he's a colossal, black-skinned cyclops, wielding a huge scimitar. His eye can emit a telekinetic beam and his rubber-like body can stretch and repel any attack by bouncing it back; however, he has the intellect of a baby. He is turned into a crazed demon by Onimaru's Demon King Sword, but is eventually defeated by Yaiba who, taking advantage of his own power, runs him through with the Supreme King Sword.
Silver (シルバー, Shirubā)
One of the two best warriors of the Underworld, he's a colossal, black-skinned cyclops, wielding a spiked ball on a chain and whose eye can emit an electrifying beam. His elastic body can also stretch and repel any attack, however, he is more intelligent than Gold, with only his eye as his weak spot. After being defeated by Yaiba and later tricked into attacking Gold, he's bisected by the latter's super heated sword.
Boss (ボス, Bosu)
The Leader of the Underworld people, he hates humans for spoiling the Earth so much and so sided with Onimaru and started the Pyramid project to punish all humans. However, Onimaru betrays him and tries to take over the pyramids for his plans of world domination. After the defeat of Silver and Gold, he is moved by Yaiba and decides to give humanity one more chance.

== Yamata no Orochi Arc ==
Rain (レイン, Rein)
One of Onimaru's underling, she's the Demon God of Water. She can manipulate water and ice and use the Water Demon Longsword. She tries to lure Yaiba into a trap on the school's rooftop to kill him but is eventually defeated by the Supreme King Sword.
Burner (バーナー, Bānā)
One of Onimaru's underling, the Demon God of Fire. He can manipulate fire and flames, uses the Fire Demon Longsword along with a fire-spitting shield and can make clones out of flames. He attacks Sayaka's mansion to force Yaiba to come out, but is eventually defeated by Yaiba and finished off by Dark.
Dark (ダーク, Dāku)
One of Onimaru's underling, the Demon God of Darkness. He can use shadows to teleport himself and others and sink enemies into a pool of sheer darkness called the "Dark Zone". His strongest power lets him use a pyramid of black energy called the "Delta Zone", to send his victims into the netherworld. He is eventually defeated by Ryuujin and absorbed into his own Delta Zone.
Plasma (プラズマ, Purazuma)
One of Onimaru's underling, the Demon God of Light. He can move at light speed, use illusions and manipulate any light source like lightnings and solar rays. He attacks Yaiba disguised as Kojiro and tries to melt the last seal, but after a fierce battle, is cut down by Yaiba. With the last of his strength, he blows himself up in order to break the ice covering the last seal.
Yamata no Orochi (ヤマタノオロチ)
A giant demonic dragon from the past sealed away by Susano'o, sealed away with eight magical swords. His current body is actually Japan itself and can grow eight monstrous heads, capable of firing destructive laser beams. It is awakened by Onimaru and used to destroy the world, but is stopped and sealed once more by the combined efforts of a Kaguya-possessed Sayaka (who blocks his heart) and Yaiba's Supreme King Sword (used to cut off his horn).

== Oda Nobunaga Tournament Arc ==
Soshi Okita (沖田 総司, Okita Sōshi)
The grandson of the historical Shinsengumi member, he's a genius swordsman, even stronger than Yaiba or even Jubei. He actually dislikes swordsmanship and would rather give it up, but after seeing that Yaiba's sheer determination is much greater than his, he is moved to increase his skills.
Frederick Luther III (フレデリック·ルーサーIII世, Furederikku Rūsā Sansei)
A Knight from Europe who fights with a saber, he pretends to be a loyal and honor-bound warrior but he actually resorts to cheating in order to win.
Gozuma (ゴズマ)
A massive warrior trained since childhood by the Shirogane Corporation to be the perfect warrior. He fights with a Da Dao and has electrical microunits all over his body that powers him up, allowing him to boost his speed and power by absorbing electrical energy. At first he looks like an emotionless cyborg but by the end of the battle he develops a genuine respect for Yaiba.

== Other characters ==
Raizo Mine (峰 雷蔵, Mine Raizō)
Voiced by: Unshō Ishizuka (1993 series), Tesshō Genda (Conan vs. KID vs. Yaiba), Atsushi Miyauchi (2025 series) (Japanese); Patrick Seitz (English)
Sayaka's father, and an old rival of Kenjuurou. He is a kendo master and has his own dojo.
Shizuka Mine (峰 静香, Mine Shizuka)
Voiced by: Kyoko Terase (1993 series), Rina Satō (2025 series) (Japanese); Jennifer Sun Bell (English)
Sayaka's mother.
Fuji Mine (峰 富士, Mine Fuji)
Voiced by: Reiko Suzuki (1993 series), Kimiko Saitō (2025 series) (Japanese); Jessica Gee-George (English)
Sayaka's grandmother. More commonly known as Goinkyo (ご隠居; Retired Person), she is a very strict and seems to know more about kendo than Raizo.

== Swords ==
Raijin-ken (雷神剣, Lightning God Sword)
Yaiba's sword, Raijin-ken has an orb within it marked with the kanji for "Thunder". It has the power to control the thunder. It was called "Sword of Thunder God" in the Philippines' English-dubbed version of the anime. Throughout his adventures in Japan, Yaiba finds several other orbs in search of the Dragon God's Orb, which are listed as follows:
- Water (水) - This orb allows Yaiba to control water by swinging his sword and can shoot water from the tip of the sword. It was found in Lake Biwa.
- Gold (金) - Allows Yaiba to transform into different people and objects. He earned this orb from the Tanuki in Shikoku.
- Fire (火) - This orb allows Yaiba to shoot balls of flame from his sword. It was found on Mount Aso.
- Big (大) - Lets Yaiba grow huge. The first time he used this orb, he grew large enough to leave the atmosphere. However by the time the orb runs out of power, it turns black and Yaiba becomes exhausted because he used up all his stamina. It takes time to recharge the orb before he can use it again. It was found in Nara.
- Darkness (闇) - This orb is the most dangerous of all. It can suck up anything in its path including the user as an act of desperate measure. When Yaiba used it for the first time, he got sucked into the orb along with Jubei, though they got out from the orb successfully. It was found in Niigata.
- Ice (氷) - This orb allows Yaiba to shoot ice from the tip of this sword. It also allows him to freeze water into ice. It was found in Hokkaidō.
- Reliance (当) - This talking orb indicates the position of all the other orbs. It was found in Tōhoku. Voiced by Shigeru Chiba (1993 series), Shun Horie (2025 series) (Japanese); Derek Stephen Prince (English).
- Dragon (龍) - Contains all of the powers of the six other orbs from Water to Ice. Whenever he uses it, the Raijin-ken changes its shape; turning into the Ryūjin-ken. This also happened when he used the orb on Onimaru's Fūjin-ken when the Raijin-ken was swallowed by Kaguya-hime. The orb has 3 abilities: Yaiba can fly while holding the sword; it can create a powerful energy shield that can block projectiles and; he can summon the Dragon God by activating all of the orbs, including the Dragon Orb as well to unveil its ultimate power. It was found inside of Mount Fuji.
Fūjin-ken (風神剣, Wind God Sword)
Onimaru's sword, Fūjin-ken has an orb within it marked with the kanji for "Wind". It has the power to control the wind. It was called "Sword of Devil Wind" in the Philippines' English-dubbed version of the anime.
Ryūjin-ken (龍神剣, Dragon God Sword)
Raijin-ken and Fūjin-ken's form when the Dragon orb is inserted.
Haō-ken (覇王剣, Supreme King Sword)
The legendary sword that once wielded by Susanoo to seal Yamata no Orochi inside Japan. In Pyramid arc, when Yaiba fought Jewel, Yaiba's Raijin-ken and Fūjin-ken changed their shapes into one sword, the Supreme King Sword. It is far stronger than Raijin-ken and Fūjin-ken. It changed the wielder's fighting powers into its power.
Maō-ken (魔王剣, Demon King Sword)
The demonic sword created by Kaguya to rule the Moon, but because of its immense power, it destroyed all the bamboo forests on the Moon. It was once used by Gekko to fight Yaiba and Onimaru. Onimaru later took it as his new weapon instead of the Fūjin-ken. It has three attack forms: the Crescent Slash (weakest attack); the Half-Moon Slash and; the Full-Moon Slash (strongest attack) which has the power to destroy one planet in an instant. It changed the evil powers into its power. It was called "Sword of Devil King" in the Philippines' English-dubbed version of the anime.
Suima no Tachi (水魔の太刀, Water Demon Longsword)
Rain's sword. It has the power to summon water and changes its shape into whatever the wielder wants.
Enma no Tachi (炎魔の太刀, Fire Demon Longsword)
Burner's sword. It has the power to summon fire and change its shape into whatever the wielder wants.
Kenjūrō no Bokuto (剣十郎の木刀, Kenjūrō's Wooden Sword)
Kenjūrō's wooden sword with his name on its handle. In the Oda Nobunaga Tournament arc, Yaiba got it from his mother and used it in the tournament.
Kikuichi Monji (菊一文字, Chrysanthemum Crest)
The sword of the famous Soshi Okita.
Monohoshizao (物干し竿, Washing Pole)
Kojiro's famous sword that can be stretched as long as the wielder wants.
Ma-ken Kusanagi (魔剣クサナギ, Demon Sword Kusanagi)
Yaiba's current sword. It gives him the ability to fly at high speed and he can summon it just by whistling.
