= Hisao Egawa =

Japanese voice actor

- Occupation: Voice actor
- Years active: 1991–present
- Agent: Aoni Production

Hisao Egawa (江川 央生, Egawa Hisao) is a Japanese voice actor who works for Aoni Production. Egawa is most known for the roles of Shin'ichi Maki in Slam Dunk, Geki Kuroiwa in Brave Command Dagwon, Geki Hyūma and Goldymarg in The King of Braves GaoGaiGar, Ogremon and Mugendramon in Digimon Adventure, Killer Bee in Naruto Shippuden, Falco Lombardi in the Star Fox series, and Purple Haze in JoJo's Bizarre Adventure: All Star Battle.

In 2016, he became the second voice actor to voice for Keiishin Ukai of Haikyu!! after Kazunari Tanaka's death.

== Filmography ==
=== Television animation ===
1992

- Dragon Ball Z (Aqua, Bora, Gozu, Man in City, Olibu, P.E. Teacher, Papoi, Pirozhki, Spopovitch, Teacher, Torubi)
- Sailor Moon (Announcer, Band-Man, Boss Cat, Clerk, Soldier)

1993

- Kenyū Densetsu Yaiba (Kagetora, Professor Kanabo)
- Ghost Sweeper Mikami (Right Gatekeeper)
- Aoki Densetsu Shoot! (Shigeki Otsuka)
- Slam Dunk (Shinichi Maki)
- Sailor Moon R (Jakoku, Old Man)

1995

- Kuso Kagaku Sekai Gulliver Boy (Maron, Priest, Sensei)
- Romeo and the Black Brothers (Boss B)

1996

- Jigoku Sensei Nube (Yamagami)
- Brave Command Dagwon (Geki Kuroiwa)

1997

- The Slayers Try (Kurabos)
- Cooking Master Boy (Al)
- Chō Mashin Eiyūden Wataru (Rottman)
- Pokémon (Construction Director)
- GaoGaiGar: King of the Braves (Genki Hyuma, Goldy Marg)
- Flame of Recca (Tsumemaru)

1998

- Outlaw Star (Kyokan)
- Trigun (Gunman A, Man A, Marvin)
- Master Keaton (Truck Driver)
- Yu-Gi-Oh! (Headman, Red)
- Record of Lodoss War: Chronicles of the Heroic Knight (Rabid)

1999

- Kindaichi Shounen no Jikenbo (Takashi Ishikawa)
- The Big O (Waiter)
- Turn A Gundam (Daimyo)
- Digimon Adventure (Ogremon, Mugendramon)
- BuBu ChaCha (Hippo Truck)
- Infinite Ryvius (Brian Brab Jr., Fu Namuchia)

2000

- Clockwork Fighters Hiwou's War (Ishi)
- Hajime no Ippo (Toshiyuki Ohta)
- Boogiepop Phantom (Officer Morita)
- Mushrambo (Iris)
- Detective Conan (Haruyuki Yoshino)
- One Piece (Kuroobi)

2001

- Inuyasha (Bandit leader, Jinenji)
- Geisters: Fractions of the Earth (Urba Shamarel)
- Shaman King (Kajimahide, Mosuke)
- Zone of the Enders (Bashiriko Basilisk)
- Daisuki! BuBu ChaCha (Hippo Truck)
- Noir (Paolo)
- Detective Conan (Kengo Bito, Osamu Kenzaki)

2002

- Overman King Gainer (Yassaba Jin)
- Mobile Suit Gundam Seed (Captain Hoffman)
- Ultimate Muscle (The Cyborg)
- The Twelve Kingdoms (Goson)
- Tenshi na Konamaiki (Goshima)
- Heat Guy J (Daqui)
- Full Metal Panic! (Koh)

2003

- Inuyasha (Ginkotsu, Villager)
- Zatch Bell! (Dalmos)
- Mermaid Forest (Fisherman)
- Texhnolyze (Akihisa Sonoda)
- Bōken Yūki Pluster World (Zanagul)
- Bobobo-bo Bo-bobo (Kirariino)

2004

- Area 88 (Captain Shibukawa)
- Kinnikuman Nisei - Ultimate Muscle (Blocks, Legocs)
- Samurai Gun (Lord Kozan)
- Samurai Champloo (Habu)
- Naruto (Fukusuke Hikyakuya)
- Burst Angel (Eiji)
- Phoenix (Getsudan)
- Black Jack (Azizi, Delinquent A)
- Bleach (Bulbous G, Danzomaru, Shrieker)
- BECK: Mongolian Chop Squad (Micchan)
- Detective Conan (Naokazu Fukuchi, Keiji Hotta)
- Paranoia Agent (Yoshihiro Wanibuchi)
- Ragnarok The Animation (Holgren)

2005

- Aria the Animation (Akatsuki's Brother)
- The Law of Ueki (Sakura Suzuki)
- GUNxSWORD (Sheriff, Zanak)
- Speed Grapher (Makabe)
- Xenosaga: The Animation (Andrew)
- Shinshaku Sengoku Eiyū Densetsu - Sanada Jū Yūshi The Animation (Kani Saizo Yoshinaga)
- Transformers: Cybertron (Jackshot)
- Black Cat (Naizer Bruckheimer)
- Brave King GaoGaiGar Final Grand Glorious Gathering (Geki Hyūma)
- Rockman EXE Beast (Zoano GutsMan)

2006

- Aria The Natural (Akatsuki's Brother)
- Gintama (Saigou, Shuwa)
- Kekkaishi (Yoki)
- Jyu-Oh-Sei (Professor Loki)
- Black Blood Brothers (Badrick Serihan)
- Black Lagoon (Abrego)
- Black Lagoon: The Second Barrage (Abrego, Sahalov)
- Detective Conan (Hozumi)
- Yu-Gi-Oh! Duel Monsters GX (Male Yubel)
- Yume Tsukai (Overseer)

2007

- Kishin Taisen Gigantic Formula (Raizo Rakuichi)
- Gegege no Kitarō (Tsurube-Otoshi)
- Kenichi: The Mightiest Disciple (Bouncer)
- Neuro: Supernatural Detective (Souta Tsutsui)
- Red Garden (Randy)

2008

- Allison & Lillia (Man 1)
- Kaiba (Vanilla)
- Mobile Suit Gundam 00 Second Season (Arthur Goodman)
- Hakaba Kitarō (Chairman)
- Antique Bakery (Gymnastics Chairman)
- Nabari no Ou (Shiranui)
- Persona -trinity soul- (Kunio Itou)

2009

- Golgo 13 (Bernard Kelly)
- Sōten Kōro (Cao Hong/Sō Kō)

2010

- Dragon Ball Kai (Pirozhki)
- Naruto Shippūden (Killer Bee)
- Pocket Monsters: Best Wishes! (Don George)
- Beyblade: Metal Masters (George)
- Rainbow - Nisha Rokubō no Shichinin (Igarashi)
- Stitch! ~Best Friends Forever~ (Stitch's clone)

2011

- Gintama (Saigou Tokumori)
- Tamayura - Hitotose (Ichirō)
- Toriko (Morijii)
- Phi-Brain - Puzzle of God (Cafeteria Oyaji)
- Blade (Saragi)
- Beyblade: Metal Fury (George)

2012

- Mobile Suit Gundam AGE (Zanald Beyhard)
- Sket Dance (Daijirō Kutsuwa)
- Smile Precure! (Warubuttaa)
- Muv-Luv Alternative: Total Eclipse (Kozo Sanada, Teacher)
- High School DxD (Zatouji)
- Phi-Brain - Puzzle of God: The Orpheus Order (Zatouji)
- Btooom! (Yoshihisa Kira)
- Persona 4: The Animation (Daidara Shopkeeper)
- One Piece Episode of Nami: Kōkaishi no Namida to Nakama no Kizuna (Kuroobi)

2013

- Saint Seiya Omega (Eigaion)
- Hajime no Ippo Rising (Iwao Shimabukuro)
- Hakkenden: Eight Dogs of the East (Kenta's Father)
- Pocket Monsters: Best Wishes! Season 2: Decolora Adventure (Don George)

2014

- Yona of the Dawn (Yu-Hon)
- Rage of Bahamut: Genesis (Garth, Ghos)
- The World Is Still Beautiful (Chamberlain B)
- Marvel Disk Wars: The Avengers (Nick Fury)
- Dragon Ball Kai (Bora, Spopovitch)
- Hero Bank (Shishio Torai)
- Persona 4 the Golden Animation (Master Daidara)
- Momokyun Sword (Tekki)
- The Last: Naruto the Movie (Hamura Otsutsuki)

2015

- Ushio & Tora (Hitotsuki)
- Dragon Ball Super (Pirozhki)

2016

- World Trigger (Gatlin)
- Haikyu!! (Kenshin Ukai)

2017

- Natsume's Book of Friends Six (Hyakko (ep. 6))
- Kirakira PreCure a la Mode (Glaive)
- Kakegurui (Jun Kiwatari (ep. 4 & 5))

2018

- GeGeGe no Kitarō 6th series (Wanyūdō (ep. 13))
- Karakuri Circus (Shinobu Nakamachi)

2019

- Fairy Gone (Biivii Risukaa)

2020

- Dorohedoro (Vaux)
- Haikyu!! (Kenshin Ukai)
- Digimon Adventure: (Ogremon)

2021

- World Trigger 2nd Season (Gatlin)

=== Theatrical animation ===
- Dragon Ball Z: Super Android 13! (1992) (Android 14)
- Fatal Fury: The Motion Picture (1994) (Big Bear)
- Street Fighter Alpha: The Animation (1999) (Rosanov)
- Dōbutsu no Mori (Animal Crossing film) (2006) (Daruman (Hopper))
- Welcome to the Space Show (2010) (Rubin)

==== Unknown date ====
- Dokidoki! PreCure the Movie: Mana's Getting Married!!? The Dress of Hope Tied to the Future! (Purple Buggy)
- Dragon Ball: The Path to Power (Sergeant Metallic)
- Dragon Ball Z: Bojack Unbound (Bido, Tenkaichi Budokai announcer)
- Dragon Ball Z: Plan to Eradicate the Saiyans (God Guardon)
- Naruto the Movie: Blood Prison (Killer Bee)
- Pokémon 4Ever (Ursaring)

=== Original net animation ===
- 7 Seeds (2019) (Dōsei Yanagi)
- Super Crooks (2021) (The Salamander)

=== Video games ===
Year	Title	Role	Console	Source
1995	Double Dragon	Cheng-Fu, Duke	Neo Geo AES, Neo Geo CD	
1996	Super Dodge Ball	Shinji		
1997	Tobal 2	Ill Goga	PlayStation	
2001	Inuyasha	Bandit leader	PlayStation	
2002	Xenosaga Episode I: Der Wille zur Macht	Andrew Cherenkov		
2002	Zero 4 Champ Series: Drift Champ	Yuugo Torisu	PlayStation 2	
2004	Airforce Delta Strike	Holst Prendre, Robert Williams, Donald Chan	PlayStation 2	
2004	Metal Gear Solid 3: Snake Eater	The Pain		
2005	Star Fox: Assault	Falco Lombardi	GameCube	
2005	Romancing SaGa	Storm		
2006	JoJo's Bizarre Adventure: Phantom Blood	Jack the Ripper	PlayStation 2	
2006	Castlevania: Portrait of Ruin	Brauner	Nintendo DS	
2008	Valkyria Chronicles	Largo Potter		
2011	Warriors Orochi 3	Cao Ren, Goemon Ishikawa, Yoshihiro Shimazu		
2015	Yakuza 0	Sohei Dojima		
2016	Persona 5	Munehisa Iwai		
2016	Samurai Warriors: Spirit of Sanada	Goemon Ishikawa, Yoshihiro Shimazu		
2018	Valkyria Chronicles 4	Dan Bentley		
2018	Yakuza Kiwami 2	Sohei Dojima		
2019	Oninaki	Zephyr		

- Dead or Alive (1996) (Bayman)
- JoJo's Bizarre Adventure (1997) (Mohammed Avdol)
- Shenmue (1999) (Charlie)

==== Unknown date ====
- Call of Duty: Modern Warfare 3 (Yuri, Japanese voice)
- Dragon Ball Z: Budokai Tenkaichi 2 (Tenkaichi Budokai announcer, Freeza Soldier #2)
- Dragoon Might (Kodama, Suiko, Jaoh, Dogma)
- Dynasty Warriors series (Cao Ren)
- Fullmetal Alchemist and the Broken Angel (Gantz Bresslau)
- Fate/Extra (Lancer/Vlad III)
- Fate/Grand Order (Geronimo, Vlad III 〔Extra〕)
- Kaiser Knuckle (known outside Japan as Global Champion) (Gonzales)
- Kessen (Sakakibara Yasumasa)
- Kessen III (Takeda Katsuyori)
- Langrisser I & II (Soun)
- Lego Batman 3: Beyond Gotham (Swamp Thing)
- Mega Man Zero 3 (Tretista Kelverian)
- Ninja Gaiden (Gamov)
- Sakura Wars: In Hot Blood (Rasetsu)
- Samurai Warriors 2 (Shimazu Yoshihiro)
- Shining Force Neo (Rhinos)
- Star Fox 64 (Falco Lombardi, Wolf O'Donnell, others)
- Star Ocean: Till the End of Time (Shelby)
- Super Smash Bros. Melee (Falco Lombardi)
- Super Smash Bros. Brawl (Falco Lombardi, Little Mac)
- Super Smash Bros. for Nintendo 3DS and Wii U (Falco Lombardi, Nightmare)
- Tenchu: Stealth Assassins (Onikage, Japanese voice)
- Time Crisis 4 (Captain Marcus Black, Lieutenant Colonel Gregory Barrows)
- Tokyo Afterschool Summoners (Aegir)
- Super Smash Bros. Ultimate (Nightmare)

=== Tokusatsu ===
- Gridman the Hyper Agent (1993) (Rebirth Shinobilar (ep. 15) (Normal Voice by Nobuhiko Kazama), Kung Fu Shinobilar (ep. 29)
- Ninja Sentai Kakuranger (1994) (Daimaou's younger Daidarabotchi (ep. 50)
- Juukou B-Fighter (1995) (Ikari-Bomber (ep. 11), Ikari-Bomber II (ep. 27)
- Gekisou Sentai Carranger (1996) (VV Goriin (ep. 23)
- B-Fighter Kabuto (1996) (Fang Tiger Beast Dorafire (ep. 16)
- B-Robo Kabutack (1997) (Ganiran)
- Kyuukyuu Sentai GoGo-V (1999) (Bomb Psyma Beast Gasguile (ep. 3)
- Hyakujuu Sentai Gaoranger (Wedding Dress Org (ep. 6)
- Tokusou Sentai Dekaranger (2004) (Cristonian Ferley (ep. 14)
- Mahou Sentai Magiranger (Victory General Branken (eps 1–18)
- Ultraman Mebius (Roberga (ep. 31), Glozam (ep. 43, 46)
- Engine Sentai Go-onger (Engine Bus-on)
- Engine Sentai Go-onger: Boom Boom! Bang Bang! GekijōBang!! (Engine Bus-on)
- Engine Sentai Go-onger vs. Gekiranger (Engine Bus-on)
- Samurai Sentai Shinkenger vs. Go-onger: GinmakuBang!! (Engine Bus-on)
- Tensou Sentai Goseiger (Bari-Boru-Dara of the Uniberus Headder (ep. 47)
- Kaizoku Sentai Gokaiger (Engine Bus-on (ep. 35–36)
- Tokumei Sentai Go-Busters (Bulldozerloid (ep. 36)
- Ressha Sentai ToQger (Bag Shadow (ep. 1)
- Doubutsu Sentai Zyuohger (Prisonable (ep. 21)
- Uchuu Sentai Kyuranger (Yuterujan (ep. 14)
- Kaitou Sentai Lupinranger VS Keisatsu Sentai Patranger (Limon Gaolfang (ep. 23–25)
- Kamen Rider Zi-O (Kikai Driver (ep. 23–24)

=== Dubbing roles ===
==== Live-action ====
- Dominic Purcell
  - Prison Break (Lincoln Burrows)
  - The Gravedancers (Harris McKay)
  - Vikingdom (Eirick)
  - Assault on Wall Street (Jim Baxford)
  - Breakout (Tommy Baxter)
  - In the Name of the King III (Hazen Kaine)
  - A Fighting Man (Sailor O'Connor)
  - The Flash (Mick Rory/Heat Wave)
  - Turkey Shoot (Cmdr Rick Tyler)
  - Gridlocked (David Hendrix)
  - Isolation (Max)
  - Legends of Tomorrow (Mick Rory / Heat Wave / Chronos)
  - Crisis on Earth-X (Mick Rory / Heat Wave)
- Dave Legeno
  - Harry Potter and the Half-Blood Prince (Fenrir Greyback)
  - Harry Potter and the Deathly Hallows – Part 1 (Fenrir Greyback)
  - Harry Potter and the Deathly Hallows – Part 2 (Fenrir Greyback)
- 10,000 BC (2011 TV Asahi edition) (Nakudu (Joel Virgel))
- 12 Strong (General Abdul Rashid Dostum (Navid Negahban))
- 2 Fast 2 Furious (Tej Parker (Ludacris))
- American Gangster (Leroy Nicholas "Nicky" Barnes (Cuba Gooding Jr.))
- Armored (Baines (Laurence Fishburne))
- Babylon 5 (Doctor Stephen Franklin (Richard Biggs))
- Belly of the Beast (General Jantapan (Tom Wu))
- Blue Steel (1993 Fuji TV edition) (Robber (Tom Sizemore))
- Casino Royale (Steven Obanno (Isaach De Bankolé))
- Chappie (Amerika (Jose Pablo Cantillo))
- The Constant Gardener (Arnold Bluhm (Hubert Koundé))
- Die Hard with a Vengeance (Otto (Richard E. Council))
- The Fundamentals of Caring (Cash (Bobby Cannavale))
- Ghostbusters: Afterlife (Sherman Domingo (Bokeem Woodbine))
- Hidden Figures (Jim Johnson (Mahershala Ali))
- Home of the Brave (Specialist Jamal Aiken (Curtis Jackson))
- Inception (2012 TV Asahi edition) (Yusuf (Dileep Rao))
- Just Mercy (Walter McMillian (Jamie Foxx))
- Last Light (2009 DVD edition) (Fred Whitmore (Forest Whitaker))
- Léon: The Professional (Benny (Keith A. Glascoe), Tonto (Lucius Wyatt Cherokee))
- Magic Mike XXL (Tarzan (Kevin Nash)
- The Mentalist (Wayne Rigsby (Owain Yeoman))
- Notorious (Christopher Wallace / The Notorious B.I.G. (Jamal Woolard))
- Ocean's Twelve (2007 NTV edition) (Roman Nagel (Eddie Izzard))
- Predators (Mombasa (Mahershala Ali))
- Resident Evil: Extinction (Lloyd Jefferson Wade (Mike Epps))
- Secret in Their Eyes (Raymond "Ray" Kasten (Chiwetel Ejiofor))
- She-Wolf of London (Male Student 3)
- Suicide Squad (George "Digger" Harkness / Captain Boomerang (Jai Courtney))
- The Suicide Squad (George "Digger" Harkness / Captain Boomerang (Jai Courtney))
- Supernatural (Gordon Walker (Sterling K. Brown))
- Transformers: Revenge of the Fallen (Sideswipe)
- Transformers: Dark of the Moon (Sideswipe)
- True Romance (Don 'Big Don' (Samuel L. Jackson))
- X-Men Origins: Wolverine (John Wraith (will.i.am))

==== Animation ====
- Batman: The Brave and the Bold (Despero)
- Happy Feet Two (Seymour)
- Planet Hulk (Hulk)
- Meet the Robinsons (Coach)
- Shrek the Third (Merlin)
- Shrek Forever After (Jamie)
- Surf's Up 2: WaveMania (J.C.)
- Thomas the Tank Engine and Friends (Diesel (Season 6), Derek, S.C.Ruffey, Cranky (Season 5-8), Jem Cole (Season 5))
