= Majin Bone =

Japanese media franchise

マジンボーン
- Manga
- Written by: Naoya Sugita
- Published by: Shueisha
- Magazine: Saikyo Jump
- Original run: January 4, 2014 – May 6, 2015
- Volumes: 2
- Anime television series
- Directed by: Kōnosuke Uda
- Written by: Daisuke Habara (eps 1-6); Isao Murayama (eps 7-52)
- Music by: Katsuki Maeda; Takatsugu Wakabayashi
- Studio: Toei Animation
- Original network: TXN (TV Tokyo)
- Original run: April 1, 2014 – March 31, 2015
- Episodes: 52
- icon

Majin Bone (マジンボーン; 'Devil Bone') is a digital card game by Bandai. A manga series is serialized in the magazine Saikyo Jump by Shueisha and an anime television series debuted on April 1, 2014, on TX Network stations.

== Characters ==
=== Earth Warriors ===
Shougo Ryujin/Dragon (竜神翔悟, Ryujin Shougo)
Voiced by: KENN
Shougo is an ordinary high school student who notices strange occurrences all over the Earth. Most of them are being attributed to weather phenomena. When visiting his friend Saho's house one afternoon he hears a mysterious sound. The sound ends up being the voice of Dragon Bone resonating with him. The two merge, and, while he is reluctant at first to accept the responsibility of fighting, Shougo determines he must fight in order to protect his everyday life.

Dragon Bone
Voiced by: Hozumi Gōda

Luke/Shark (ルーク, Ruku)
Voiced by: Shinnosuke Tachibana
The unspoken leader of Earth's Warrior. He carries the dimensional device and was the first one to become a bone adept. Luke is willing to sacrifice anyone or anything to keep the Dragon Bone safe. His father, Ian, is the head of the Research Institute in Los Angeles.
Antonio/Jaguar (アントニオ, Antonio)
Voiced by: Hiroyuki Yoshino
A former thief that was found in the slums and resonated with Jaguar Bone. Antonio became a performer and a master of all trades. He tries to befriend anyone and everyone but is willing to dive in front of any attack he thinks will hurt his friends.
Tyrone/Rhino (タイロン, Tairon)
Voiced by: Hiroki Yasumoto
The oldest of 16 kids. Tyrone fights to keep his 8 sisters and 7 brothers safe. He listens to the environment with the belief that listening to others can allow peace and prosperity more so than always battling.
Gilbert/Leo (ギルバート, Girubāto)
Voiced by: Yūko Sanpei
A 13-year-old college student from America. Gilbert chose to become a bone adept so he could protect the Earth. He often refers to himself as being "The Ace." Gilbert is an expert boxer and is the first adept to gain an iron bone.
Gregory/Wolf (ゴレゴリー, Goregorī)
Voiced by: Hiroaki Hirata
Victor's brother. He is a war orphan. After Director Higashio saved his life he was accepted by his bone. Currently he works with the Nepos Council because he feels Earth betrayed him when they tried to kill him.
Victor/Tiger (ヴィクトール, Vikutōru)
Voiced by: Akira Ishida
Gregory's brother. He is a war orphan. After Director Higashio saved his life he was accepted by his bone. Currently he works with the Nepos Council because he feels Earth betrayed him when they tried to kill him.

=== Neposian Council ===
- Stolz/Phoenix
- Klude/Wyvern
- Revolt/Cerberus
- Socius/Uroboros
- Barlish/Behemoth
- Pellebrand/Leviathian
- Raquelt/Basilisk
- Carvaleo/Unicorn

=== Eques Warriors (referred to as Dark Bones) ===
- Liebert/Panther: Liebert is the daughter of Stolz
- Morse/Bear: One of Liebert's henchmen.
- Gusstos/Grizzly: One of Liebert's henchmen.
- Freyd/Bat: The silent one of the Dark Bones
- Gladis/Swordfish
- Vyse/Eagle
- Drossas/Alligator
- Apis/Bee
- Semiria/Hawk
- Ullurra/Owl
- Ventoza/Kraken
- Corvus/Crow
- Serpence/Snake
- Griffon
- Horse
- Scorpion
- Spider
- Beetle

=== Other characters ===
Saho Shimatani (島谷早穂, Shimatani Saho)
Voiced by: Eri Sendai
Shougo's childhood friend. In the first episode her house is destroyed when the warriors of Nepos Angelis sense that Dragon Bone is nearby. She moves in with Shougo's family and begins to notice the changes in his life, but she feels Shougo is leaving her behind because he won't share his secrets with her. She is a huge fan of UFOs and anything that relates to life on other planets.
Tomoko Ryujin (竜神智子, Ryujin Tomoko)
Voiced by: Minako Kotobuki
Shougo's older sister. She owns a restaurant and uses the funds to help support the dojo her father runs. She believes her mother ran away from the family. She often closes the restaurant to allow the bone adept warriors a private place to conference, though she doesn't know of the secrets of any of them.
Kengo Ryujin (竜神健悟, Ryujin Kengo)
Voiced by: Kazunari Tanaka
Shougo's father. He knows that his wife is alive and that she is doing something private to help protect the Earth, but he refuses to share any of this with his kids until Shougo tells him that he knows his mom is alive. He runs a local dojo.
Kiyoko Shimatani (島谷喜代子)
Voiced by: Yuka Imai
Saho's mother. She oftentimes isn't seen, but when she is shown it is helping to run the dojo or doing laundry for the family after Kengo allows her and Saho to move into the dojo.
Momotaro (桃太郎, Momotaro)
Voiced by: Yūko Gibu
Saho's little dog. He oftentimes is found barking. He senses when warriors from Nepos Angelis arrive and acts as a warning voice should a bone adept not be around.
Anna Christine (アンナ·クリスティー, an'na kurisutī)
Voiced by: Ai Kobayashi
The Assistant Director of the Melbourne Lab. Anna often comes up with weapons to help fight bone fighters once they are in bone form, but she also tries to act as the most cautious voice when it comes to attacking the unknown.
Director Higashio (東尾, higashio)
Voiced by: Akio Otsuka
The Director of the Melbourne Lab. He was the head bone researcher who rescued Victor and Gregory from a war savaged country before they were accepted by Wolf and Tiger. He is usually drunk and believes his words can provide anyone hope.
Leonard (レナード, renādo)
Voiced by: Shintaro Asanuma
The leader of all bone research team for The Lab, both in Melbourne in Australia. He takes multiple trips to Japan whenever new bone data is unlocked to update his records. Currently he's working with Chie Ryuujin to try and unlock the final form of the cocoon and master the hidden powers of Majin Bone. He acts like a typical mad scientist and is nicknamed the demon scientist because of the tests he comes up with.
Ian (イアン)
Voiced by: Hiroshi Yanaka
The Director of the Los Angeles Lab and Luke's father.
Chie Ryuujin (竜神智恵)
Voiced by: Akemi Okamura
The mother of Shougo. She is also the head researcher for cocoon technology for bone research. At a young age she saw visions of the Nepos Angelis Council attacking when Shougo got older, and she knew the Earth would be destroyed if she couldn't come up with technology to counter it. Chie spends her time in space working on the cocoon's, which have to be made in zero gravity. She isn't able to talk with any of her family, outside of Shougo when he is at one of the labs, but she has vowed to return to be with them when the Earth is finally safe.

== Anime ==
=== International Broadcasts ===
In the Philippines aired premiere January 22 until July 23, 2017, on GMA Network.
