= Baby Elephant Walk =

1961 song by Henry Mancini and Hal David

Song by Henry Mancini and his Orchestra
- Released: 1962
- Songwriters: Henry Mancini (music), Hal David (lyrics)

"Baby Elephant Walk" is a song composed in 1961 by Henry Mancini for the 1962 film Hatari! Lyrics by Hal David were not used in the film version. The instrumental earned Mancini a Grammy Award for Best Instrumental Arrangement in 1963.

== Background ==
The tune was written for an impromptu scene in Hatari! in which Dallas (Elsa Martinelli) led three baby elephants to a waterhole to bathe. The catchy simplicity has made it one of Mancini's most popular works, appearing on many compilation albums. Hal David composed lyrics for it, which were not used for the film but appear in the printed sheet music. Pat Boone used the lyrics in his recording released by Dot Records in 1965. Mancini's version was not released as a single.

Brass instruments (including repeated blasts from the tuba) and woodwind elements are combined to convey a large and plodding elephant toddler that is filled with the exuberance of youth. Mancini uses a calliope introduction to suggest the sound of a circus. A cheeky melody is then played over this on a clarinet, and the song concludes with the calliope playing the old four-note phrase known as "Good Evening, Friends".

The overall style is as that of boogie-woogie, as Mancini explained:

I looked at the scene several times [and] I thought, 'Yeah, they're walking eight to the bar', and that brought something to mind, an old Will Bradley boogie-woogie number called 'Down the Road a Piece' ... Those little elephants were definitely walking boogie-woogie, eight to the bar. I wrote 'Baby Elephant Walk' as a result.

The cheerful tone, like that of Mancini's "The Pink Panther Theme", presents a stark contrast to more melancholy Mancini standards such as "Moon River". Due to its "goofy" sound, it is often used in a humorous context. As the AllMusic album review states, "if Hatari! is memorable for anything, it's for the incredibly goofy 'Baby Elephant Walk,' which has gone on to be musical shorthand for kookiness of any stripe. Get this tune in your head and it sticks."

== Chart history ==
"Baby Elephant Walk" performed by Lawrence Welk and His Orchestra peaked at #48 on the U.S. Billboard Hot 100 in the summer of 1962 as well as #10 on the Easy Listening chart. In Canada it reached #17, co-charting with versions by Miniature Men and Kai Winding.

== Cover versions ==
The song was recorded by a number of performers in the 1960s, including:

- Dalida, who recorded Petit Éléphant Twist in 1962, with French lyrics.
- the Fabulous Echoes on their 1963 Diamond Records album Those Fabulous Echoes
- Bill Haley & His Comets who recorded a version for Orfeon Records in 1964.
- Singles by Lawrence Welk and by the Miniature Men both reached the Billboard Top 100 the same week in 1962.
- Quincy Jones includes it on his 1964 album Quincy Jones Explores the Music of Henry Mancini.
- In 1963, Brazilian pre-Jovem Guarda group Trio Esperança recorded a vocal version of this song, titled "O Passo do Elefantinho", with lyrics written by Ruth Blanco. This version achieved #14 on the 1963 Brazil radio charts.

== Popular culture ==
- For a period of time, it was used as the theme song to The Ramblin' Rod Show, a children's television show.
- Tokyo Ska Paradise Orchestra recorded the song as "Tiny Elephant Parade" on their 1990 album Ska Para Toujou.
- The first few seconds of the song were interpolated in the 1980 arcade game Crazy Climber as the 5-second intro tune to each building (level).
- In 1986, the song was featured in Cheers season 5 episode 10: "Everyone Imitates Art", in which Woody whistles the song.
- In 1990 the song was featured in The Simpsons season 2 episode 5: "Dancin' Homer", in which a drunk Homer dances to the song which inspires the Springfield Isotopes baseball team to win.
- In 1994 Willi One Blood sampled the melody of "Baby Elephant Walk" for the chorus of the song "Whiney Whiney (What Really Drives Me Crazy)" as featured on the soundtrack for the film Dumb and Dumber.
- In 1996 the song was featured in Friends season 3 episode 7: "The One with the Race Car Bed". Joey hums the song during the episode's opening scene.
- In 2016, the song was used in a Land Rover TV ad.
