= Global Champion =

Global Champion may refer to:

- GFW Global Champion, a professional wrestling world heavyweight champion
- Kaiser Knuckle, a 1994 fighting game
