= Fujimi Orchestra =

Japanese novel series

- Cover of the first novel

富士見二丁目交響楽団 (Fujimi Nichōme Kōkyō Gakudan)
- Genre: Yaoi, Drama, Romance
- Novel series
- Written by: Kō Akizuki
- Illustrated by: Keiko Nishi; Sei Goto
- Published by: Kadokawa Shoten
- Imprint: Kadokawa Ruby Bunko
- Original run: March 31, 1994 – present
- Volumes: 54
- Manga
- Written by: Kō Akizuki
- Illustrated by: Sei Goto
- Published: Kadokawa Shoten
- Original video animation
- Directed by: Akira Nishimori
- Studio: Anime International Company
- Released: July 22, 1997
- Runtime: 60 minutes
- Live-action film

Cold Front Conductor
- Directed by: Satoshi Kaneda; Shinsuke Hakoda
- Written by: Rino Itaya
- Studio: Geneon Universal Entertainment
- Released: 12 February 2012

Fujimi Orchestra (Japanese: 富士見二丁目交響楽団, Hepburn: Fujimi Nichōme Kōkyō Gakudan; lit. "Fujimi Block No. 2 Symphony Orchestra") is a yaoi Japanese novel series that has had a manga, an anime Original Video Animation, and a live-action film based on it. The novels are written by Kō Akizuki, and feature an amateur orchestra, its concertmaster and its conductor. Tounoin Kei, a musical genius who has studied extensively in the area of conducting, falls in love with violinist and music teacher, Morimura Yuuki. Morimura also acts as concertmaster for the amateur orchestra that meets three times a week at the Fujimi Civic Center. Morimura is in love with Kawashima Natsuko, a female flutist in the orchestra, but Kawashima falls for Tounoin when he joins as the group's new conductor in order to get closer to Morimura. The unfolding relationships serve as the bases of the stories.

== Plot ==
Fujimi Orchestra is primarily about Tounoin and Morimura's romance, but also follows their musical careers. After being berated by Tounoin time and again, Morimura says he wants to quit the orchestra. To prevent this, Tounoin steals his violin and leads him to his house, where he forces himself on the violinist. Upon realizing that the encounter is Morimura's first time with a male lover, he is remorseful and confesses his love, telling him that Kawashima does not love him. With emotions overwhelming him, Morimura flees, but slips down a flight of wet stairs. Tounoin nurses the injured violist back to health, proving his devotion is genuine. In the end, Morimura stays with Fujimi Orchestra despite Tounoin's continued pressure to improve his playing while surreptitiously pursuing the man behind closed doors.

== Media ==
The novels are published by Kadokawa Ruby Bunko, a publishing company which specializes in Boy's Love titles. The first 16 novels and 3 additional character books were illustrated by Nishi Keiko, while all those that have been released since have been illustrated by Sei Goto. The first and fourth stories in the series were made into a manga which was illustrated by Goto.

The series also has a number of audio drama and musical accompaniment CDs released by Sony Music (Liner Notes Music) and June Collections.

The series also had an Original Video Animation made for it entitled Cold Front - The Storm After the Rain, which featured the first story (entitled Cold Front Conductor in the novel), in which Kei and Yuuki meet and events are set into motion. The OVA is actually from Morimura's perspective (as are the novels and the majority of the drama CDs), and is set after things have begun, so Yuuki explains the situation in retrospect.

== Voice actors ==
- Yuuki Morimura: Ryōtarō Okiayu, Ryō Horikawa and Sōichirō Hoshi.
- Kei Tounoin: Yasunori Masutani, Kunihiko Yasui, Ken Narita, and in a doujinshi CD, by Toshiyuki Morikawa.
- Natsuko Kawashima: Masako Katsuki
- Kento Igarashi: Akira Ishida
- Kunimitsu Ishida: Hideyuki Umezu
- Takane Ikushima: Kazuki Yao
- Sora Yasokawa: Kappei Yamaguchi

== Soundtrack music ==
The sound track of Fujimi Orchestra is composed primarily of european classical music. The soundtracks include music from a number of composers including, among others, Wagner, Mozart, Bach, Beethoven, Vivaldi, Mendelssohn, and Brahms.

All original music composed for Fujimi Orchestra is written by Fujio Takano (高野ふじお) and is released on CD by Sony Music.
