= Kazuki Yao =

Japanese voice actor (born 1959)

- 矢尾 一樹
- Born: June 17, 1959 (age 67); Kanazawa, Ishikawa Prefecture, Japan
- Occupations: Actor; voice actor; narrator
- Years active: 1970–present
- Notable work: Mobile Suit Gundam ZZ as Judau Ashta
- Spouses: Miina Tominaga (1990–????); Natsuki Hayashi (m. 2011)
- Website: lit.link/en/yao-chan

Kazuki Yao (矢尾 一樹, Yao Kazuki; born June 17, 1959) is a Japanese actor and narrator. He is married to actress Natsuki Hayashi.

== Biography ==
As a child, Yao was very active, building secret bases with his friends and playing outside, and did not watch TV much. In addition, because his father was a government official, he had to be transferred every three years, so he moved from place to place. When he was in the second year of junior high school, he was transferred to Tokyo, and the government office building that he moved into was too small for a TV, so his family decided not to have a TV. At that time, his sister, who was four years older than him, and his mother were fond of musicals and plays, and Yao accompanied them to see them. At the time, it was popular for kabuki actors to perform William Shakespeare's plays, and he saw a Shakespeare play starring Kawarasaki Gonjūrō, and when he saw the stage greeting at the final performance of the play, it solidified his desire to become a stage actor. As soon as he graduated from high school and went to college, one of the women in his class was the younger sister of Shōichirō Akaboshi, so he started going to the rehearsal room of Matenrō Theater Company run by Takuya Hiramitsu with her help, and after being involved in a couple of productions as a staff member, he joined the stage as an actor. One of his seniors in the same theater company was Hozumi Gōda.

Matenrō Theater Company was one of the more popular small theater companies, but it did not generate enough income to keep them afloat. For a while, Yao worked part-time while doing theater activities, but when he realized that he could not go on like this, he consulted with the staff and was introduced to a production company, which led him to get work in TV dramas and movies. Among them, he had an audition for an anime and made his voice acting debut as Shurugi Nam in the OVA BIRTH. Naturally, he had no experience in dubbing, and although he was the lead actor, he did not understand the technical terms included in the director's instructions, but he was helped by his co-stars Keiko Toda and Jōji Yanami, and he still looks up to them as his teachers.

In 1985, Yao played the role of Shinobu Fujiwara in the TV anime series Dancouga – Super Beast Machine God. This is the series that Yao considers most memorable, and he says it was the show that made him understand what it meant to play an anime character. In addition, Shinobu's line, "I'll do it!" (やってやるぜ！, Yatte yaruze!) is a byword for Yao, and is often quoted in other works. In the arcade game Kaiser Knuckle, in addition to "I'll do it!", he also shouts, "Dancouga!" in some scenes. He also sang a song called "YATTE YARUZE!", which is included in his 1986 album YAO.

After working for Haikyō, M-Company, and Sigma Seven (May 20, 2004 – May 2009), he became a member of Max Mix on June 1, 2009, until 2025.

On December 8, 2024, the staff of the One Piece anime television series announced that Yao would be stepping down from his role as Franky, the staff stated in an announcement that this was part of a long discussion process. A "graduation ceremony" for Yao was held on December 22 of that year during Jump Festa, where the show announced his replacement as Subaru Kimura.

== Filmography ==
=== Television animation ===
- Dancouga – Super Beast Machine God (1985) (Shinobu Fujiwara)
- Mobile Suit Zeta Gundam (1985) (Gates Capa, Addis Aziba)
- Mobile Suit Gundam ZZ (1986) (Judau Ashta)
- NG Knight Lamune & 40 (1990) (Da Cider)
- Wedding Peach (1995) (Pluie)
- Detective Conan (1996) (Naoki Uemura)
- VS Knight Lamune & 40 Fire (1997) (Da Cider)
- Harelya II Boy (1997) (Reiji Maroka)
- Initial D (1998) (Kouichirou Iketani)
- Detective Conan (1998) (Kenichi Shishido)
- Beast Wars Neo (1999) (Saberback)
- Betterman (1999) (Bodaiju)
- Monster Rancher (1999) (Tiger)
- One Piece (Jango)
- Great Teacher Onizuka (2000) (Toshiyuki Saejima)
- Digimon Adventure 02 (2000) (Igamon)
- Hunter × Hunter (1999) (2000) (Izunabi (episode 45))
- One Piece (2001) (Mr. 2 Bon Clay)
- Astro Boy (2003) (Skunk)
- Konjiki no Gash Bell!! (2003) (Steng)
- Ninja Scroll: The Series (2003) (Kawahori)
- F-Zero Falcon Legend (2003) (Jack Levin)
- Fullmetal Alchemist (2003) (Lieutenant Yoki)
- Kenran Butohsai (2004) (Episode 18, Crawley)
- Sweet Valerian (2004) (Stress Team)
- One Piece (2005) (Franky)
- Detective Conan (2005) (Kano)
- Genesis of Aquarion (2005) (Moroha)
- Nerima Daikon Brothers (2006) (Prime Minister Oizuma)
- Keroro Gunsou (2006) (Zoruru)
- Detective Conan (2006) (Kuramoto Youji)
- Demonbane (2006) (Tiberius)
- Kenichi: The Mightiest Disciple (2006) (Takeda Ikki)
- Death Note (2007) (Sidoh)
- Kaiji (2007) (Kitami)
- Detective Conan (2007) (Kahara Fuuga)
- Detective Conan (2008) (Toby Keynes)
- Real Drive (2008) (Ayumu Fujiwara)
- Mobile Suit Gundam 00 (2008) (Arbor Lint)
- Pokémon (2008) (Tougan)
- Detective Conan (2009) (Yaguchi Akihiko)
- Digimon Xros Wars (2011) (Zamielmon)
- Wolverine (2011) (Hideki Kurohagi)
- One Piece (2011) (Fake Sogeking)
- Hunter × Hunter (2011) (2011) (Majitani)
- Naruto: Shippuden (2011) (Suika)
- Detective Conan (2013) (Reiji Himuro)
- Detective Conan (2017) (Ginji Kajiyoshi)
- One Piece (2018) (Charlotte Tablet)
- Blade Runner: Black Lotus (2021) (Hooper)

Unknown date

- Agatha Christie's Great Detectives Poirot and Marple (Desmond)
- Beast Wars (Starscream)
- Black Jack (Takashi)
- Captain Tsubasa (Heffner)
- Corrector Yui (Kasuga Shinichi)
- Doraemon (Red haired Gang Member)
- Grenadier (Suirou)
- Gunslinger Girl (Marco)
- Hanada Shōnen Shi (dad)
- Inuyasha: The Final Act (Kaō, English: The Flower Prince)
- Jankenman (Masked Osodashi)
- Marchen Awakens Romance (Puss n' Boots)
- Pretty Sammy TV (Ginji Kawai)
- Saint Seiya Omega (Taurus Harbinger)
- Street Fighter II V (Fei Long)
- Tenjho Tenge (Bunshichi Tawara)
- Yaiba (General Mongetzu, Gekko)
- Zoids: Chaotic Century (Stinger)

=== Original video animation (OVA) ===
- The Heroic Legend of Arslan (1993) (Guibu)
- Rance: Sabaku no Guardian (1993) (Rance)

Unknown date

- Amon: The Apocalypse of Devilman (Seylos)
- Bastard!! (Dark Schneider)
- Crystal Triangle
- Gunbuster (Aim for the Top! - Top wo Nerae!) (Smith Toren)
- Legend of the Galactic Heroes (Warren Hughs)
- Madara (Seishinja)
- Megazone 23 Parts I and II (Shogo Yahagi)
- Murder Princess (Dominikov)
- Ushio and Tora (Juro)
- Yagami-kun's Family Affairs (Yūji Yagami)
- Soreyuke Marin-chan (Stripper in episode 2)

=== Theatrical animation ===
- Violinist of Hameln (1996) (Hamel)
- Berserk: The Golden Age Arc (2012) (Gaston)
- City Hunter the Movie: Shinjuku Private Eyes (2019)

=== Video games ===
- Angelique (xxxx) (Pastha)
- Demonbane (xxxx) (Tiberius)
- Dynasty Warriors: Gundam (xxxx) (Judau Ashta)
- Dynasty Warriors: Gundam 2 (xxxx) (Judau Ashta)
- Earnest Evans (1991) (Earnest Evans)
- Initial D Arcade Stage series (xxxx) (Koichiro Iketani)
- Linda Cube (1995) (Ken Challenger)
- Last Bronx (1996) (Yusaku Kudo)
- Kaiser Knuckle (known outside Japan as Global Champion) (xxxx) (Kazuya)
- Maji de Watashi ni Koishinasai! S (xxxx) (Chosokabe)
- One Piece (xxxx) (Jango, Mr. 2 Bon Clay, Franky)
- Puyo Puyo CD (xxxx) (Dark Prince)
- Puyo Puyo Tetris (xxxx) (X)
- Super Robot Wars series (xxxx) (Judau Ashta, Gates Capa, Fujiwara Shinobu, Fog Sweeper, Tiberius, Da Cider)
- Tales of the Abyss (2005) (Dist)
- Ys 4: The Dawn of Ys (xxxx) (Mīyu)

=== Drama CDs ===
- Fujimi Orchestra Series 2: D-Senjou no Aria (xxxx) (Tsutomu Yasaka)
- Fujimi Orchestra Series 6: Manhattan Sonata (xxxx) (Takane Ikushima)
- Fujimi Orchestra Series 7: Recital Rhapsody (xxxx) (Takane Ikushima)
- Fujimi Orchestra Series side story: Yasei no Amadeus (xxxx) (Takane Ikushima)
- Yumemiru Nemuri Otoko (xxxx) (Kenji Anan)

=== Tokusatsu ===
- Ninja Sentai Kakuranger (1994) (Ninjaman/Samuraiman) (Eps. 36-53)
- Gekisou Sentai Carranger (1996) (OO Batton) (Ep. 40)
- B-Robo Kabutack (1997) (Denden Roller)
- Voicelugger (1999) (Buzzerma) (Ep. 1)
- Moero！！ Robocon (1999) (Roboboss (Voice), Police (Actor)
- Mirai Sentai Timeranger vs. Go Go V (2001) (Murder Boxer Boribaru/Fused Psyma Boripierre (Voice of Taiki Matsuno)
- Mahou Sentai Magiranger (2005-2006) (Hades Ultimate God Drake) (Eps. 35-42)
- GoGo Sentai Boukenger (2006) (Ouga) (Ep. 40-42)
- Kaizoku Sentai Gokaiger (2012) (Ninjaman) (Ep. 45-46)
- Unofficial Sentai Akibaranger (2012) (Doctor Z/Takehiro Tsuzuki (Actor)
- Zyuden Sentai Kyoryuger (2013) (Debo Nagareboshi) (Ep. 17-18, 21, 36)
- Shuriken Sentai Ninninger (2015) (Advanced Yokai Oboroguruma) (Ep. 36)
- Kamen Sentai Gorider (2017) (Totema)
- Super Sentai Strongest Battle (2019) (Ninjaman (Ep.1 Non Credit))

=== Dubbing ===
==== Live-action ====
- Gridlock'd, Alexander "Stretch" Rawland (Tim Roth)
- Kung Fu Hustle, Brother Sum (Danny Chan Kwok-kwan)
- Lost Boys: The Tribe, Edgar Frog (Corey Feldman)
- Snatch, Franky Four-Fingers (Benicio del Toro)
- That Thing You Do!, Lenny Haise (Steve Zahn)

==== Animation ====
- Adventure Time, Billy

=== Other ===
- Yan and the Japanese People: Let's Learn Japanese (1984-1995) (Taro Kato)

== Awards ==
Year	Award	Category	Result	Ref.
1986	9th Anime Grand Prix	Voice actor of the Year	Won	
