= One Piece The Movie: Dead End no Bōken =

2003 film by Kōnosuke Uda

One Piece the Movie: Dead End no Bōken
- Theatrical release poster

Japanese name
- Kanji: ONE PIECE THE MOVIE デッドエンドの冒険
Transcriptions
- Revised Hepburn: Wan Pīsu Za Mūbī: Deddo Endo no Bōken
- Directed by: Konosuke Uda
- Screenplay by: Yoshiyuki Suga
- Starring: Mayumi Tanaka; Kazuya Nakai; Akemi Okamura; Kappei Yamaguchi; Hiroaki Hirata; Ikue Ōtani; Yuriko Yamaguchi
- Cinematography: Takumi Wakao (Note: Credited as Digital Photography Director (デジタル撮影監督).); Yoshitada Ishii (Note: Credited as Digital Photography Chief (デジタル撮影チーフ).)
- Edited by: Shinichi Fukumitsu
- Music by: Kōhei Tanaka; Shirō Hamaguchi
- Production company: Toei Animation
- Distributed by: Toei Company, Ltd.
- Release date: March 1, 2003
- Running time: 95 minutes
- Country: Japan
- Language: Japanese
- Box office: ¥2 billion

One Piece the Movie: Dead End no Bōken (Japanese: ONE PIECE THE MOVIE デッドエンドの冒険, Hepburn: Wan Pīsu za Mūbī Deddo Endo no Bōken; lit. One Piece The Movie: Dead End Adventure) is a 2003 Japanese animated film directed by Konosuke Uda and written by Yoshiyuki Suga. It is the fourth animated movie in the film series of the One Piece anime and the franchise's first full-length feature, released independently of any "Toei Anime Fair" event. It was released on March 3, 2003. Desperate for cash, the Straw Hat Pirates enter a secret race between pirate crews known as the Dead End Competition. There, they must battle against powerful people, including the bounty hunter who wants to kill Gasparde and a climactic battle with marine-turned-pirate Captain Gasparde.

== Plot ==
In a port town pub, the once again flat broke Straw Hats witness a suspicious exchange between a customer and the proprietor. Nami immediately senses money and endeavors to convince the host to give her whatever information he had given him. The other Straw Hats join in and soon he is persuaded. He shows them to a backdoor, behind which they find a long and winding tunnel. That tunnel leads to a large underground chamber, where a number of pirate crews have a gathering. The island they are on, turns out to be the starting point of an irregularly occurring, anything-goes sailing competition. For a moment, the Straw Hats weigh whether it is wise to join in the race, considering that two giants and a crew of fish-men, who were once the rivals of Arlong's gang, were participating as well. But once they learn the height of the price money, not entering is out of the question. From the bookmaker they receive an eternal pose, to lead them to the goal of the race. Free food is available at the bottom of the chamber and Luffy makes extensive use of it. His eating habit of stealing other people's food quickly angers the bounty hunter Shuraiya Bascùd (シュライヤ・バスクード, Shuraiya Basukūdo), as well as a group of men led by Gasparde (ガスパーデ, Gasupāde). Gasparde is a deserted naval officer, with a bounty more than three times as high as Luffy's and said to be the race's favorite. A fight arises, and after Luffy and Shuraiya beat up his men.

They find themselves standing before the general himself. He is impressed with their skill and offers both of them to work under him. Of course they refuse, but Luffy finds some insulting words to do it and is caught off guard by Gasparde's right-hand man, Needles. Luffy's courage impresses Gasparde even more. He renews his offer, orders Needles to let go of the rookie pirate, and leaves the room. The next morning, a strong ocean current starts the race, by pushing the ships upstream over the island. As soon as they are over the top, the various crews start shooting broadsides, board each other's ships, and ram their competitors out of the water. But once the island is left behind, the field quickly clears up, leaving the Straw Hats time to eat. While inspecting the ship, Zoro discovers a boy named Anaguma (アナグマ), who had stowed away to earn money by killing some pirate to buy medicine for his adoptive grandfather, who works as an engineer on Gasparde's partially steam powered ship. The race continues. After fighting yet another rival crew and an encounter with a group of large sea kings, they arrive at the island the eternal pose is pointing to. The eternal poses were all mislabeled and led the fleet of unsuspecting pirates into reach of the cannons of the navy stronghold Navarone. Luffy has no doubt to whose fault it is. They turn around and using Chopper's fine nose, attempt to catch up with Gasparde's ship. Shuraiya, who had followed Gasparde's invitation to come along on his ship, turns against him to take revenge for Gasparde's killing his parents and sister. He fights Needles and throws him over board, but stands no chance against Gasparde's Logia-type powers, which allow him to turn parts or all of his body into liquid or solid candy. The general is about to kill the bounty hunter, when the Straw Hats arrive and catch his attention. Luffy confronts him and the two engage in a fierce but one-sided battle. Any attack Luffy throws at his opponent causes his limbs to get stuck in Gasparde's body. Only after Sanji gives two sacks of flour to Luffy, can he overcome the villain's ability. Anaguma turns out to be a girl and Shuraiya's thought-dead sister, Adele Bascùd (アデル・バスクード, Aderu Basukūdo). With all their competitors taken out, the Straw Hats are about to arrive at the goal of the race, when a fleet of navy ships appears and forces them to abandon their prize money, as onlookers note that Luffy's latest bounty is higher than Gasparde's.

== Cast ==
Character	Japanese voice actor
Monkey D. Luffy	Mayumi Tanaka
Roronoa Zoro	Kazuya Nakai
Nami	Akemi Okamura
Usopp	Kappei Yamaguchi
Sanji	Hiroaki Hirata
Tony Tony Chopper	Ikue Ōtani
Nico Robin	Yuriko Yamaguchi
Anaguma	Miki Sakai
Gasparde	Taro Ishida
Needless/Willy	Jūrōta Kosugi
Shuraiya	Mitsuru Miyamoto
Biera	Ichirō Nagai
Vigaro	Kōji Haramaki
Bobby/Marine Sergeant	Tetsu Inada
Pogo/Bookie	Daisuke Gōri
Drake	Eiji Takemoto
Bartender	Takeshi Aono

== Music ==
ONE PIECE THE MOVIE The Dead End Adventure MUSIC COLLECTION
#	Title	Length	Notes
01	Main Title ~ Port City Hannabal	2:53	Music Composed & Arranged: Kohei Tanaka (01,04~07,13, 15~17,19,21~26) Shiro Hamaguchi (02,03,08~12,14,18,20,27,28) 29 Performed: Ruppina Words: Mai Kudo Music: Fumio Yasuda Arrangement: Naoto Suzuki Conductor: Kohei Tanaka Strings: Hiroyuki Koike Group Trumpet: Masahiko Sugasaka Group Trombone: Osamu Matsumoto Group Horn: Otohiko Fujita Group Flute: Takashi Asahi, Yoshio Kizu Oboe: Masakazu Ishibashi Clarinet: Tadashi Hoshino Percussion: Midori Takada Percussion: Tomoko Kusakari Piano: Masato Matsuda Harp: Tomoyuki Asakawa Fagotto: Josuke Ohata Synth Operator: Minoru Maruo [まるおみのる] Recording Engineer: Juji Nakamura Musician Coordinate: 太田敏明 (ベルベットライン), 野間愛理子 (ベルベットライン) Mastering Engineer: Tetsuya Yamamoto (a-studio), Rena Koyanagi (a-studio) Recording Studio: Sound City Trackdown Studio: APPO SOUND PROJECT Mastering Studio: a-studio
02	Underground Bar, Big Hole!	3:05	
03	Big Fight	1:33	
04	Gasparde	0:55	
05	Recruit	1:43	
06	Straw Hat	0:58	
07	Anaguma	0:56	
08	Morning of the Start	1:23	
09	The Wind's Coming!	0:31	
10	Dead End, Start!	4:17	
11	No-Rules Pirate Race	1:04	
12	The Going Merry Flies!!	1:21	
13	If You Live	1:08	
14	Fierce Fighting! Zoro & Sanji	1:11	
15	Resolution for Ambition	1:10	
16	Beat Gasparde!	2:39	
17	Shuraiya's Past	0:29	
18	Shuraiya vs Needles	0:42	
19	Gasparde's Power	1:20	
20	Luffy's Here!	1:21	
21	Alive!	0:23	
22	Luffy vs Gasparde	2:21	
23	Torn Straw Hat	2:22	
24	Approaching Cyclone	0:31	
25	Boiler Room, Countdown to Explosion!!	0:54	
26	A Real Pirate!!!	2:47	
27	Life's Interesting	1:59	
28	Set Sail	1:55	
29	Free Will (TV Size)	1:44	
Disc length		45:35	

== Film comic ==
Shueisha created a film comic adaptation of the film, titled Gekijōban One Piece: Deddo Endo no Bōken (劇場版One Piece デッドエンドの冒険, meaning One Piece The Movie: The Adventure of "Dead End" (Note: This translation is given in the background of the volumes' table of contents.)) and released it in two volumes on October 3, 2003 (ISBN 4-08-873547-1 and ISBN 4-08-873548-X).

First volume chapter list

1. "Deddoendo e Yōkoso" (デッドエンドへよう こそ, lit. "Welcome to the Dead End")
2. "Shuraiya to Gasupāde" (シュライヤとガスバーデ, lit. "Shuraiya and Gasparde")
3. "Rēsu Sutāto!" (レース開始!, lit. "The Race Begins!")
4. "Hiretsu Naru Wana" (卑劣なる罠, lit. "The Foul Play Is a Trap")

Second volume chapter list

1. "Shuraiya Totsugeki" (シュライヤ突撃, lit. "Shuraiya's Assault")
2. "Hokori" (誇り, lit. "Pride")
3. "Arashi no Naka no Gekitō" (嵐の中の激闘, lit. "Fierce Battle in the Midst of a Storm)
4. "Ketchaku" (決着, lit. "Conclusion")
5. "Asu e no Ippo" (明日への一歩, lit. "A Step Towards Tomorrow")
