= Dragoon Might =

1995 video game

- Japanese arcade flyer of Dragoon Might.
- Developer: Konami
- Publisher: Konami
- Directors: Yuji Asano; Tomohiro Ishimoto
- Producer: Masahiro Inoue
- Programmers: Tomohiro Ishimoto; Tomoaki Yoshinobu; Akihide Tanimura; Takeaki Hasegawa
- Artists: Yuji Asano; Kanbanmusume; Toshiaki Matsumoto; Ikuya Nakamura
- Composers: Mayuko Kageshita; Naomitsu Ariyama
- Platform: Arcade
- Release: August 1995
- Genre: 2D Versus Fighting
- Mode: Up to 2 players simultaneously
- Arcade system: Konami GX hardware

Dragoon Might (ドラグーンマイト) is a 2D competitive fighting game produced by Konami and released as a coin-operated video game in August 1995.

== Gameplay ==
Dragoon Might features two distinct game modes. A single match mode in which the player must defeat their opponents in round-based matches, and a team match mode similar to The King of Fighters series in which two teams of three members must battle each other until the members of one team are all defeated.

Like most fighting games, special moves are performed by inputting a specific series of directional commands and/or buttons. The game features a unique type of special moves known as "Bomber Moves" (a.k.a. "Super Attacks" in the US version), which can deliver greater damage than standard special moves in exchange of some of the player's vitality. These moves act like those from most beat 'em up games and are performed by pressing all three punch buttons. There are also "Super Bomber" moves (also called "Final Attacks" in the US version) which can only performed while the player's vitality gauge is flashing. The player can also jump unto trees or cranes to avoid attacks by pressing all three kick buttons. The player can attack an opponent who is lying on the ground, as well as do an emergency escape roll when his/her character is knocked to the ground.

== Characters ==
Dragoon Might features a total of twelve selectable characters, as well as a non-playable final boss during the game's single-player mode. The story centers around a mythical relic known as the Dragon Medallion that will grant its collector one wish. The Medallion has been broken into thirteen fragments that has subsequently come into the possession of each main character, including the final boss, who must fight each other for their fragments until one of them collects all thirteen of them. Once the player defeats all eleven rival characters, he/she must defeat the final boss in order to unite the Dragon Medallion and see his/her character's good wish granted.

Yamato (ヤマト; voiced by Kaneto Shiozawa)
The lead character. A katana-wielding warrior. In his ending, he spends his time playing pachinko after collecting the Medallion, but ends up destroying the machine when he continues losing all the time.

Tsugumi (つぐみ; v.b. Hiromi Tsuru)
The lead heroine. A shrine maiden descended from a tengu. She seeks to collect the Medallion in order to maintain world peace. She fights using a hand-held fan.

Kodama (木霊; v.b. Hisao Egawa)
A ninja who serves the Sanada clan. He is the only playable character who fights barehanded.

Tekkamen (鉄仮面 ("Iron Mask"); v.b. Kaneto Shiozawa)
A masked ninja who is also a serial killer. He wields a claw on one hand and a crescent-shaped blade on the other.

Reggie (レジー; v.b. Kazunari Tanaka)
A stern-looking underground professional wrestler with a title "Reggie the Black Hole" who wishes to be on the front stage with his younger brother. He wields a jackknife.

Layla (レイラ, Leila; v.b. Hiromi Tsuru)
A tonfa-wielding female warrior who seeks to save her ill mother. In her ending, her mother is saved.

Ryan (雷庵, Raian; v.b. Kaneto Shiozawa)
A sinful monk who seeks material wealth. He fights using his monk staff. In his ending, he has a huge collection of treasure as a reward as for collecting all the pieces of the Medallion.

Suiko (酔虎, Yoitora; v.b. Hisao Egawa)
A gluttonous monk who spends most of his time eating and drinking. He fights using his large prayer beads.

Drake (ドレイク; v.b. Kazunari Tanaka)
A smug spear-wielding warrior.

Sarumaru (猿丸; v.b. Kazunari Tanaka)
The comical leader of a tribe of monkeys living in Monkey Mountain. He wields two large blades which are equipped under his sandals.

Jaoh (ジャオウ, Jaou; v.b. Hisao Egawa)
A large warrior in dark purple and red armor who wields a bladed yoyo.

Zack (ザック, Zach; v.b. v.b. Hiromi Tsuru)
A young zweihänder wielding knight.

Dogma (ドグマ; v.b. Hisao Egawa)
The final adversary in the single-player mode. A computer-only character. An evil sorcerer who seeks to rule the world.
