= Kōnosuke Uda =

Japanese director of anime (born 1966)

- 宇田 鋼之介
- Born: February 1, 1966 (age 60); Shizuoka Prefecture, Japan
- Education: Tokyo Design Academy (Animation)
- Occupation: Anime director

Kōnosuke Uda (宇田 鋼之介, Uda Kōnosuke; born 1966 in Shizuoka) is a Japanese director of anime. He graduated from the Animation Department of Tokyo Design Academy and worked as a freelancer at Toei Animation. His most notable work has been as a series director for One Piece, including two of its feature films. Other works directed include Ginga e Kickoff!!, Rainbow Fireflies, Majin Bone, and Days. He currently works mainly for MAPPA.

== Filmography ==
=== TV series ===
- One Piece (1999–2006) - Director
- The File of Young Kindaichi (2007) - Director
- Love Com (2007) - Director
- Ginga e Kickoff!! (2012–2013) - Director
- Majin Bone (2014) - Director
- One Piece: Adventure of Nebulandia (2015) - Director
- DAYS (2016) - Director, series composition
- One Piece: Episode of Skypiea (2018) - Chief director
- Hinomaru Sumo (2018–2019) - Chief director, series composition
- Ranma ½ (2024) - Director, sound director

=== Films ===
- One Piece: Dead End Adventure (2003) - Director
- One Piece: The Giant Mechanical Soldier of Karakuri Castle (2006) - Director
- Rainbow Fireflies (2012) - Director
- Zombie Land Saga: Yumeginga Paradise (2025) - Chief director
