= Willi One Blood =

American musician

- Born: September 11, 1956 (age 70)
- Occupations: Singer, actor
- Years active: 1990–present

Willi One Blood (born William Robert Harbour) is a reggae singer and actor, formerly New York-based and now in Miami. He is best known for the song "Whiney Whiney (What Really Drives Me Crazy)", from the soundtrack album of the 1994 film Dumb and Dumber, which peaked at number 62 on the Billboard Hot 100.

Blood's acting credits include the films Léon: The Professional (1994) and Joe's Apartment (1996). His character in Léon is called "Blood" by Gary Oldman's Stansfield character, and "Willi Blood" by another antagonist, Malky; he is credited as "Stansfield's 1st man". Blood guest-starred in the New York Undercover episode "Catman Comes Back" (1995), and appeared as himself in the independent film Blazin' (2001).

He started his career in Kingston, Jamaica in 1988 where he performed on Reggae Sunsplash in Montego Bay. He went on to record several singles in Jamaica and collaborated with such artists as Tony Rebel, Dignitary Stylish, Half Pint and Jack Radics, to name a few.
