= Léon: The Professional =

1994 film by Luc Besson

- French theatrical release poster
- French: Léon
- Directed by: Luc Besson
- Written by: Luc Besson
- Produced by: Patrice Ledoux
- Starring: Jean Reno; Gary Oldman; Natalie Portman; Danny Aiello
- Cinematography: Thierry Arbogast
- Edited by: Sylvie Landra
- Music by: Éric Serra
- Production companies: Gaumont; Les Films du Dauphin
- Distributed by: Gaumont Buena Vista International
- Release date: 14 September 1994
- Running time: 110 minutes
- Country: France
- Language: English
- Budget: $16 million
- Box office: $45.3 million

Léon (released in the United States and Australia as The Professional originally and then as Léon: The Professional) is a 1994 French English-language action-thriller film written and directed by Luc Besson. It stars Jean Reno, Gary Oldman and Natalie Portman in her feature film debut. The plot centers on Léon (Reno), an Italian-American professional hitman who reluctantly takes in twelve-year-old Mathilda Lando (Portman) after her family is murdered by corrupt Drug Enforcement Administration (DEA) agent Norman Stansfield (Oldman). Léon and Mathilda form an unusual relationship as she becomes his protégée and learns the hitman's trade. The film was released in France by Gaumont Buena Vista International on 14 September 1994 and received mostly positive reviews from critics.

== Plot ==
Léon is an Italian-American hitman (or "cleaner", as he refers to himself) working for a mafioso named Tony in the Little Italy neighborhood of New York City. One day, Léon meets Mathilda Lando, a lonely twelve-year-old who lives with her dysfunctional family in an apartment down the hall from Léon and has stopped attending class at her school for troubled girls.

Mathilda's abusive father attracts the ire of corrupt DEA agents, who have been paying him to stash cocaine in his apartment. After they discover that he has been stealing from their stash, DEA agents invade the apartment, led by their drug-addicted boss, Norman Stansfield. During their search for the missing drugs, Stansfield murders Mathilda's family while she is out shopping for groceries. When she returns, Mathilda realizes what has happened just in time to continue down the hall to Léon's apartment; he hesitantly gives her shelter.

Mathilda quickly discovers that Léon is a hitman. She begs him to take care of her and to teach her his skills, as she wants to avenge the murder of her four-year-old brother. At first, Léon is unsettled by her presence and considers killing her in her sleep, but he eventually trains Mathilda and shows her how to use various weapons. In exchange, she runs his errands, cleans his apartment, and teaches him how to read. Mathilda looks up to Léon and quickly develops a crush on him, often telling him she loves him, but he does not reciprocate.

When Léon is out on a job, Mathilda fills a bag with guns from Léon's collection and sets out to kill Stansfield. She bluffs her way into the DEA office by posing as a delivery girl and is ambushed by Stansfield in a bathroom. One of his men arrives and informs him that Léon had killed Malky, one of the corrupt DEA agents, in Chinatown that morning. Léon, after discovering her plan in a note left for him, rescues Mathilda, killing two more of Stansfield's men in the process. An enraged Stansfield confronts Tony, who is roughed up and forced to disclose Léon's whereabouts.

Léon tells Mathilda about how he became a hitman. When Léon was nineteen in Italy, he fell in love with a girl from a wealthy family, but Léon came from a poor family. The two made plans to elope. When the girl's father discovered their plans, he killed her out of anger. Léon killed the father in revenge and fled to New York, where he met Tony and trained to become a hitman.

Later, while Mathilda returns home from grocery shopping, an NYPD ESU team sent by Stansfield captures her and infiltrates Léon's apartment. Léon ambushes the ESU team and rescues Mathilda. Léon creates a quick escape for Mathilda by smashing a hole in an air shaft. He tells her that he loves her and to meet him at Tony's place in an hour, moments before the ESU team fires a grenade into the apartment, wounding Léon and creating chaos. He manages to disguise himself as a wounded ESU officer and sneaks down through the staircase. He goes unnoticed by everyone except Stansfield, who follows him and shoots him in the back. As Léon dies, he presses a grenade pin in Stansfield's palm, saying that it is from Mathilda. Stansfield opens Léon's vest to find a cluster of grenades, which detonate, killing Stansfield.

Mathilda goes to Tony and tries to convince him to hire her, but Tony flatly refuses to employ a twelve-year-old and tells Mathilda that he is holding Léon's money for her. Tony gives Mathilda $100 and orders her back to school, where the headmistress re-admits her after Mathilda reveals what has happened. Mathilda walks onto a field near the school to plant Léon's houseplant, as she had told Léon, to "give it roots".

== Cast ==
- Jean Reno as Léon
- Natalie Portman as Mathilda Lando
- Gary Oldman as Norman Stansfield
- Danny Aiello as Tony
- Michael Badalucco as Mr. Lando, Mathilda's father
- Ellen Greene as Margie Lando, Mathilda's stepmother
- Peter Appel as Malky
- Adam Busch as Manolo
- Joseph Malerba as Stairway Swat
- Maïwenn as The Blond Babe
- George Martin as The Hotel Clerk
- Jean-Hugues Anglade as Cameo
- Keith A. Glascoe as Benny
- Willi One Blood as 1st Stansfield Man
- Betty Miller as the Orphanage Headmistress
- Frank Senger as Fatman
- Elizabeth Regen as Mathilda's Sister
- Carl J. Matusovich as Mathilda's Brother
- Eric Challier as Bodyguard Chief
- Don Creech as 2nd Stansfield man
- Jernard Burks as Stansfield man
- Matt De Matt as Stansfield man
- Stuart Rudin as Leon's Taxi driver
- Lucius Wyatt Cherokee as Tonto
- Luc Bernard as Mickey
- Jessie Keosian as the old Lady

== Background ==
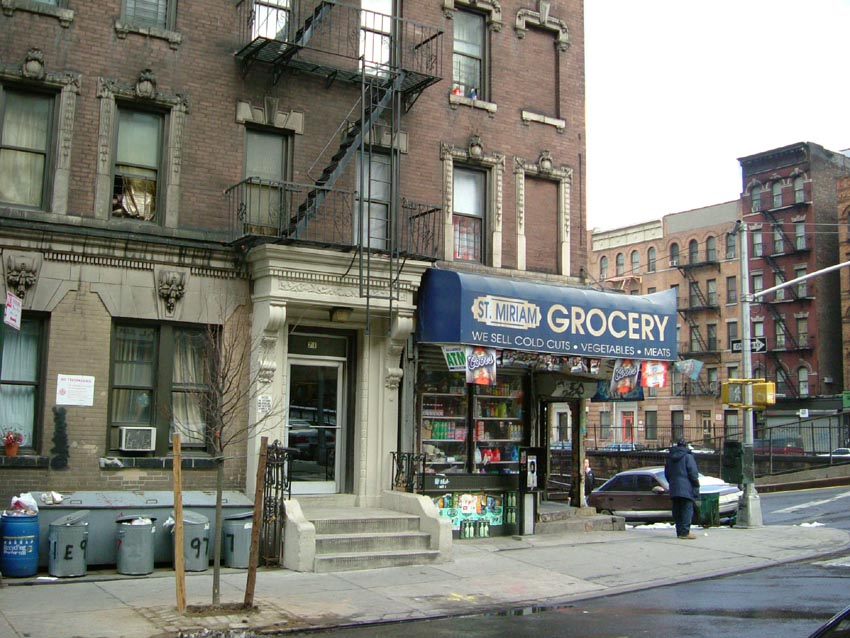
Léon and Mathilda's apartment building on the northwest corner of E 97th St & Park Ave, pictured in 2003

Léon: The Professional is to some extent an expansion of an idea in Besson's earlier 1990 film, La Femme Nikita (in some countries Nikita). In La Femme Nikita, Jean Reno plays a similar character named Victor. Besson described Léon as "Now maybe Jean is playing the American cousin of Victor. This time he's more human." Besson also drew inspiration from the character of Jef Costello in Le Samouraï. Robert Mark Kamen did an uncredited rewrite of the screenplay.

== Production ==
While most of the interior scenes were shot in France, the rest of the film was shot on location in New York City. The final scene at school was filmed at Stevens Institute of Technology in Hoboken, New Jersey.

== Soundtrack ==
A soundtrack for the film was released in October 1994 by TriStar Music. It was commercially successful in Japan, and was certified gold in December 1999 for shipping 100,000 copies.

- "Shape of My Heart" by Sting
- "The Experience of Love" by Éric Serra
- "Venus as a Boy" by Björk
- "I Like Myself" from It's Always Fair Weather

== Release ==
Léon: The Professional was released in France on 14 September 1994. The film was a commercial success, having sold $19.5 million in the US and $45.3 million worldwide. It grossed 26.8 million French francs ($5.1 million) in its opening week in France and was number one for three weeks. In France, it sold 3,623,153 tickets in total.

== Reception ==
=== Critical response ===
On Rotten Tomatoes, the film holds a critics approval rating of 76% based on 66 reviews, with an average rating of 7.3/10. Over 250,000 audience approval ratings come in at 95% with an average rating of 4.4/5. The site's critics consensus reads, "Pivoting on the unusual relationship between seasoned hitman and his 12-year-old apprentice—a breakout turn by young Natalie Portman—Luc Besson's Léon is a stylish and oddly affecting thriller." At Metacritic, the film received an average score of 64 out of 100 based on 12 critics, indicating "generally favorable reviews". Audiences polled by CinemaScore gave the film an average grade of "B" on an A+ to F scale.

Mark Salisbury of Empire magazine awarded the film a full five stars. He said, "Oozing style, wit and confidence from every sprocket, and offering a dizzyingly, fresh perspective on the Big Apple that only Besson could bring, this is, in a word, wonderful". Mark Deming at AllMovie awarded the film four stars out of five, describing it as "As visually stylish as it is graphically violent", and featuring "a strong performance from Jean Reno, a striking debut by Natalie Portman, and a love-it-or-hate-it, over-the-top turn by Gary Oldman".

Richard Schickel of Time magazine lauded the film, writing, "This is a Cuisinart of a movie, mixing familiar yet disparate ingredients, making something odd, possibly distasteful, undeniably arresting out of them". He praised Oldman's performance as "divinely psychotic". Hal Hinson, of The Washington Post, also praised Oldman's acting, saying "Reno plays it minimally; Oldman splatters his performance all over the screen. Oldman is the least inhibited actor of his generation, and as this deranged detective, he keeps absolutely nothing in reserve. When the camera gets close to him, you feel as if you want to back away."

Roger Ebert awarded the film two-and-a-half stars out of four, writing: "It is a well-directed film because Besson has a natural gift for plunging into drama with a charged-up visual style. And it is well acted." However, he was not entirely complimentary: "Always at the back of my mind was the troubled thought that there was something wrong about placing a 12-year-old character in the middle of this action. ... In what is essentially an exercise—a slick urban thriller—it seems to exploit the youth of the girl without really dealing with it." Gene Siskel gave the film one star out of four, writing: "Director Luc Besson dabbles with a kiddie porn sensibility in presenting the girl as a tart, and the gunplay is ferocious without purpose as the hitman battles a crazed DEA operative overplayed by Gary Oldman."

The New York Times' Janet Maslin wrote, "The Professional is much too sentimental to sound shockingly amoral in the least. Even in a finale of extravagant violence, it manages to be maudlin ... Mr. Oldman expresses most of the film's sadism as well as many of its misguidedly poetic sentiments."

In France, the film received mixed reviews. Oliver Nicklaus, in the magazine Les Inrockuptibles, reviewing the international version, wrote that it "drives home the point of a style that is certainly effective, but of a thought so poor that it confuses, for example, illiteracy and purity. By adorning an already simplistic film with such blue flower scenes, Besson takes the risk of flirting no longer with infantilism but with stupidity." Jean-Michel Frodon of Le Monde said it was "a misanthropic film, but not a desperate one. It affirms that there is still life and a future. It is a film infinitely ambitious in its subject (Genesis, no less), but rather modest in its execution: respect for the laws of the film of genre in the action scenes, priority given to the actors and human relationships over visual effects in the rest, which is a major part."

=== Year-end lists ===
- Honorable mention – Betsy Pickle, Knoxville News-Sentinel

== Legacy ==
In the 2013 book Poseur: A Memoir of Downtown New York City in the '90s, Marc Spitz wrote that Léon is "considered a cult classic". In 2014, Time Out polled several film critics, directors, actors, and stunt actors to list their top action films; Léon: The Professional was listed at No. 42. The character Norman Stansfield has since been named as one of cinema's greatest villains. In 2014, WhatCulture included Gary Oldman's role in their top "10 Most Convincing Movie Psychopath Performances".

Léon has been critically re-examined in the wake of the "#MeToo" movement (French: #BalanceTonPorc or 'expose your pig') after sexual assault allegations were levied against Luc Besson in 2018, Besson was exonerated by the courts in 2023. Maïwenn, his sixteen-year-old wife at the time of filming, says the film was inspired by their relationship. Besson met her when she was 15 and he was 31, they married a year later and had a child. At the time of the accusations, Natalie Portman discussed her "complicated feelings" about the film and her associated Lolita-like sexualization as a child. She also revealed that the film launched her career. Discovered by Luc Besson during a casting call, he had originally been looking for an older actress, Luc Besson was so impressed by her talent that he decided to hire her.

=== Adaptations ===
In 1999, an unauthorised Tamil-language remake titled Suriya Paarvai, directed by Jagan, was released. In 2000, the Indian Hindi-language film Bichhoo was released as an unofficial remake of the original French film. The 2026 action thriller King, directed by Siddharth Anand and Sujoy Ghosh and starring Shah Rukh Khan, has been widely reported to be inspired by the film.

The English band Alt-J released a song about the film, titled "Matilda". The first line in the lyrics, "This is from Matilda", refers to Léon's last words, shortly before his grenades detonate and kill Stansfield. South Korean comedian Park Myeong-su and singer-songwriter IU released and performed a song, "Leon", inspired by the film for a bi-annual music festival of South Korea's variety show, Infinite Challenge, in 2015. In 2022, UK rapper Knucks released his song "Leon the Professional" as part of his Alpha Place album.

== Future ==
Besson wrote a script for a sequel, Mathilda, but filming was delayed until Portman was older. In the script, Mathilda is described as "older" and "more mature" and works as a cleaner. However, in the meantime, Besson left Gaumont to start a movie studio, EuropaCorp. Unhappy at Besson's departure, Gaumont "has held The Professional rights close to the vest—and will not budge".

In 2011, director Olivier Megaton told reporters that he and Besson used the script for Mathilda as the basis for Colombiana, a film about a young 'cleaner' played by Zoe Saldaña. Like Mathilda, her character goes to war with a drug cartel as revenge for the murder of her family when she was a child.

== Extended version ==
There is an extended version of the film, referred to as the "international version", "version longue", or "version intégrale". Containing 25 minutes of additional footage, it is sometimes called the "Director's Cut", but Besson refers to the original version as the Director's Cut and the new version as "The Long Version".

According to Besson, this is the version he wanted to release; however, the extra scenes tested poorly with Los Angeles preview audiences. The additional material is found in the film's second act, and it depicts more of the interactions and relationship between Léon and Mathilda, as well as explicitly demonstrating how Mathilda accompanies Léon on several of his hits as "a full co-conspirator", to further her training as a contract killer.
