= Norman Stansfield =

Antagonist in Léon: The Professional

- Léon: The Professional character
- Gary Oldman as Stansfield in Léon: The Professional
- Created by: Luc Besson
- Portrayed by: Gary Oldman

In-universe information
- Nickname: Stan
- Occupation: DEA agent
- Nationality: American

Norman Stansfield (billed as Stansfield) is a fictional character and the primary antagonist of Luc Besson's 1994 film Léon: The Professional. Portrayed by Gary Oldman, the corrupt and mentally unhinged Drug Enforcement Administration (DEA) agent has been named as one of cinema's greatest villains. In recognition of its influence, MSN Movies described the Stansfield character as "the role that launched a thousand villains".

== Character ==
Stansfield is a DEA agent who employs a "holder" (Michael Badalucco) to store illegally obtained cocaine in his residence. When Stansfield learns that the holder has been taking a cut and adulterating the remainder, he and his henchmen gun down the man's entire family, with the exception of 12-year-old Mathilda Lando (Natalie Portman), who is able to find refuge with her neighbor Léon, who happens to be a professional hitman (Jean Reno). As the film progresses, Mathilda implores Léon to teach her his trade so she can kill Stansfield and avenge the murder of her four-year-old brother, the only member of her family she loved.

Stansfield wears gray and beige suits, and is unshaven with often unkempt hair. He has been described as a psychopath, and as having an unhinged, unpredictable personality; however he has also been cited for his charm. He is a classical music enthusiast who likens his killings to the works of Beethoven. Throughout the film, he takes a drug in capsule form that appears to be Librium, an early benzodiazepine.

== Creation and filming ==
According to director Luc Besson, the title character's austere nature gave actor Jean Reno "no room to play". Therefore, Stansfield was devised as a contrasting figure with whom "anything was possible. Anything." Although the antagonist of the film, Stansfield was intended to offer a measure of comic relief. Besson stated, "A movie without humor somewhere, is not a movie. A movie needs humor" (one writer described Stansfield as "menacing but so full of whimsical tics you can't help but let out a guilty chuckle"). Oldman had a collaborative rapport with Besson, saying, "You share ideas, and if you come up with an idea that he likes, you can bet your bottom dollar that it'll go in the movie. I liked working with Luc so much that if I actually never worked with another director again, it wouldn't worry me." In a later interview, however, Oldman alluded to some conflict with Besson on-set: "He tells you how to move, how to speak, where to stand. He tried that with me [laughs], not always with the greatest success."

Natalie Portman, who played Mathilda Lando, professed to having been "terrified" during her character's sole interaction with Stansfield. She said, "Working with Gary Oldman was probably the easiest acting experience of my life... I don't think I had to act at all in that scene. I mean, it was really simple, because he really does what he does well." Another pivotal scene is where Stansfield, who has "a talent for sniffing out a lie", interrogates Mathilda's father, played by Michael Badalucco. Stansfield has been paying him to store cocaine in his residence but suspects that he has been stealing some of the drugs for himself. The sniffing and invasion of Badalucco's personal space was improvised by Oldman, resulting in the genuine expression of unease on Badalucco's face during the scene. Oldman also improvised verbally on set.

== Reception and legacy ==
Léon: The Professional was critically well-received, with many reviewers singling out Oldman's portrayal of Stansfield for praise. Favorable comparisons were made to Jack Torrance, as played by Jack Nicholson in The Shining (1980). In a five-star review of the film, Mark Salisbury of Empire described Oldman's performance as "astonishingly histrionic"; Time's Richard Schickel characterized it as "divinely psychotic". Entertainment Weekly, in their annual film overview, honored Oldman with "Best Overacting". His exaggerated approach lent itself to the delivery of noted dialogue such as: "I haven't got time for this Mickey Mouse bullshit!", "Death is... whimsical today", "I take no pleasure in taking life if it's from a person who doesn't care about it", and "Bring me everyone. EV-ERY-ONE!" (a now "classic" scene that was originally intended as a joke by Oldman).

George Wales of Total Film argued that "you couldn't ask for a better portrayal of batshit craziness", but allowed that "Stansfield might be a little too [over the top] for some tastes". One such reviewer was the Deseret News' Chris Hicks, who described the character as "utterly ridiculous". Janet Maslin of The New York Times referred to a "preposterous role" in which Oldman expresses "misguidedly poetic sentiments". Besson suggested that Stansfield's "ironies" and "campiness" may have been lost on viewers who anticipated a stoic authority figure. He said, "To some people, it was a silly character... but [Stansfield] is the one that everyone on the street wants to talk to me about. Gary made it iconic."

Stansfield has appeared in lists of cinema's greatest villains and most corrupt cops. CNN's Screening Room series named the character one of the "Top 10 movie psychos". MSN Movies critic Daniel Bettridge wrote, "Oldman's arguably at his best as the crooked cop in Luc Besson's Leon. The English actor is pitch perfect as the nonchalant killer... it's easy to find yourself actually rooting for the charismatic crackpot." Reflecting on his days at drama school, actor Tom Hardy recalled how "everybody... used to do their impressions of [Oldman] in Léon". In 2018, financial news site 24/7 Wall Street declared Stansfield one of internet users' "50 most popular movie villains of all time", based on activity across Ranker, IMDb and Wikipedia.
