= Keith A. Glascoe =

American actor and firefighter (1962-2001)

- Glascoe in 2001
- Born: December 9, 1962; San Francisco, California, U.S.
- Died: September 11, 2001 (aged 38); South Tower, World Trade Center, New York City, U.S.
- Cause of death: Collapse of the South Tower during the September 11 attacks
- Occupations: Actor and firefighter
- Years active: 1994–2001
- Known for: Benny in Léon: The Professional

Keith Alexander Glascoe (December 9, 1962 – September 11, 2001) was an American firefighter, actor, and football player. He was killed during the September 11 attacks when the South Tower collapsed.

== Football career ==
Glascoe played college football at Springfield College for two years before transferring to Delaware State University. He played for two years at DSU as a defensive end. Following his college career, he had a tryout with the New York Jets and later played in Italy for several months.

== Death ==
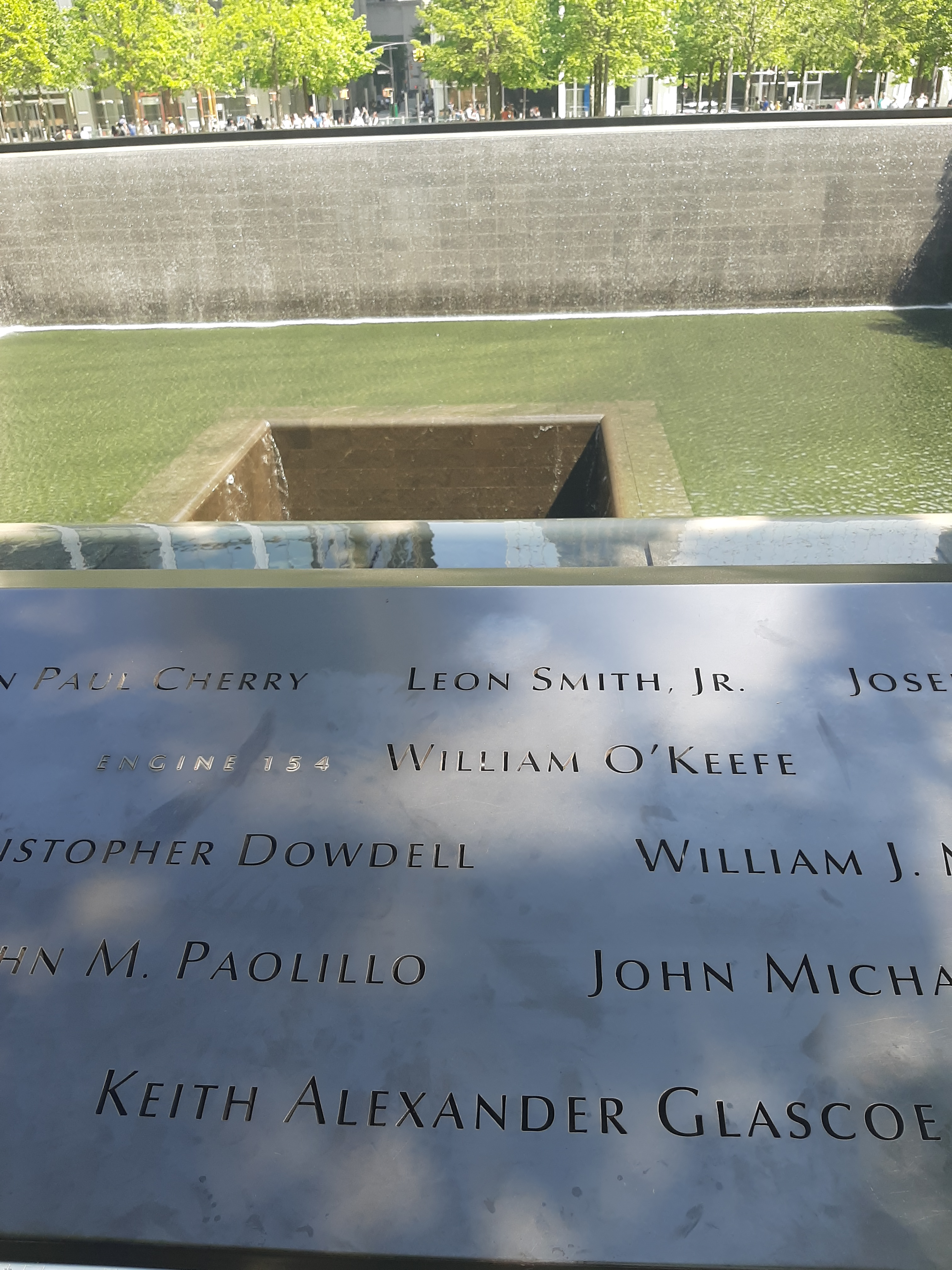
Inscription of Keith Alexander Glascoe at the National September 11 Memorial.

Glascoe was a firefighter with Ladder 21 of the New York City Fire Department. He perished when the South Tower collapsed during the September 11 attacks. His remains have never been found or identified.

At the National September 11 Memorial, Glascoe is memorialized at the South Pool, on Panel S-11, along with other first responders.

== Filmography ==
Year	Title	Role
1993	Dottie Gets Spanked	Dream Strongman
1994	Léon: The Professional	Benny (Stansfield man)
1997	Assault on Devil's Island	Carl
1997	Prime Time	Lamchop
2001	100 Centre Street	Hostage
2001	The Pirates of Central Park	Cop 2
