= Rainbow Fireflies =

- Cover artwork of the hardcover edition of the novel Niji-Iro Hotaru: Eien no Natsu Yasumi

虹色ほたる～永遠の夏休み～ (Niji-iro Hotaru: Eien no Natsu Yasumi)
- Genre: Juvenile, Coming-of-age
- Novel series
- Written by: Masayuki Kawaguchi
- Original run: May 8, 2004 – September 21, 2005
- Novel
- Written by: Masayuki Kawaguchi
- Illustrated by: Kaoru Maruyama (Note: AlphaPolis and AlphaPolis Bunko releases.); Chakutata (Note: Kizuna Bunko releases.)
- Published by: AlphaPolis
- Imprint: AlphaPolis; AlphaPolis Bunko; AlphaPolis Kizuna Bunko
- Published: July 30, 2007
- Manga
- Written by: Masayuki Kawaguchi
- Illustrated by: Madoka Asahi
- Published by: AlphaPolis
- Imprint: AlphaPolis Comics
- Magazine: AlphaPolis Web Manga
- Original run: July 20, 2011 – December 21, 2011
- Volumes: 1

Rainbow Fireflies
- Film poster advertising Niji-iro Hotaru: Eien no Natsu Yasumi in Japan
- Directed by: Kōnosuke Uda
- Screenplay by: Kei Kunii
- Based on: Rainbow Fireflies by Masayuki Kawaguchi
- Starring: Akashi Takei; Ayumi Kimura
- Cinematography: Masao Ōnuki
- Music by: Masataka Matsutoya
- Production company: Toei Animation
- Release date: May 19, 2012 (Japan)
- Running time: 104 minutes
- Country: Japan
- Language: Japanese

Rainbow Fireflies (虹色ほたる～永遠の夏休み～, Niji-iro Hotaru: Eien no Natsu Yasumi; Rainbow-Colored Fireflies: The Eternal Summer Vacation) is a Japanese novel written by Masayuki Kawaguchi and published by AlphaPolis in 2007. It received a manga adaptation by Madoka Asahi, which was serialized in 2011 and collected into a single volume published by AlphaPolis in 2012. An anime film adaptation, directed by Kōnosuke Uda, was produced by Toei Animation and screened in Japanese theaters also in 2012.

== Plot ==
On a hot summer day, a young boy named Yuta visits the dam where his father died one year ago. At the site he meets a mysterious old man. He gives the old man something to drink and later that day the old man saves him after slipping off the dam. He wakes up to discover he is 30 years in the past. There he meets a girl named Saeko, who loves fireflies, and also befriends a boy his age named Kenzo.

== Characters ==
Yuta (ユウタ, Yūta)
Voiced by: Akashi Takei (child) and Takahiro Sakurai (adult)
Saeko (さえ子)
Voiced by: Ayumi Kimura (child) and Mamiko Noto (adult)
Kenzo (ケンゾー, Kenzō)
Voiced by: Osamu Nitta (child) and Kazuya Nakai (adult)
Aotengu (青天狗)
Voiced by: Chikao Ohtsuka
Hotaru Ji (蛍じい, Hotaru Jī), "Grandpa" (お爺さん, Ojī-san)
Voiced by: Tarô Ishida
Yuta's Dad (ユウタの父, Yūta no Chichi)
Voiced by: Kenyu Horiuchi
Yuta's Mom (ユウタの母, Yūta no Haha)
Voiced by: Akemi Okamura
Shintaro (伸太郎, Shintarō)
Voiced by: Yūtarō Honjō
Tatsusaburo (辰三郎, Tatsusaburō)
Voiced by: Shūhei Hara
Grandma (おばあちゃん, Obā-chan)
Voiced by: Ikuko Tani
Saeko's Father (さえ子のお父さん, Saeko no Otō-san)
Voiced by: Masahiko Tanaka
Saeko's Brother (さえ子のお兄ちゃん, Saeko no Onī-chan)
Voiced by: Yūma Ōkura
Mr. Yoshizawa (芳澤さん, Yoshizawa-san)
Voiced by: Yūki Yagi

== Media ==
=== Novel ===
Rainbow Fireflies was the first literary work written by Masayuki Kawaguchi. It was first serialized as a web novel on Kawaguchi's personal website from May 8, 2004 to September 21, 2005; its high ranking on a popularity voting website eventually attracted the attention of AlphaPolis, which then in November 2006 decided to pick the work for publication as a novel in book form.

The first edition was published as a single tankōbon hardcover volume on July 30, 2007, under the main AlphaPolis imprint (formerly known as the Dream Book Club). The front cover was illustrated by manga artist Kaoru Maruyama. Three years later, it was reprinted into two smaller bunkobon paperback volumes, dubbed the "Top Volume" (上巻, Jōkan) and the "Bottom Volume" (下巻, Gekan), on July 20, 2010, under the AlphaPolis Bunko imprint; each volume's front cover was one cropped half of a wider rendition of the original tankōbon's Kaoru Maruyama cover artwork, with the top volume's cover focusing on the boy climbing the stairs (the left half of the full artwork) and the bottom volume's cover focusing on the beetle crawling on the tilted tree (the right half).

To promote the then-upcoming animated film adaptation, a new tankōbon softcover edition, dubbed the "Lightweight Edition" (軽装版, Keisō-ban), was published by AlphaPolis on March 15, 2012, retaining the hardcover's Kaoru Maruyama cover artwork but now enclosing it within an ornate white frame (typical of most AlphaPolis keisō-ban reissues).

For the seventeenth anniversary of the novel, a "kids' bunkobon" version for younger readers was published by AlphaPolis under its Kizuna Bunko imprint on July 15, 2024, split into top and bottom volumes like the 2010 regular bunkobon reissue. Larger than regular bunkobon but smaller than tankōbon in paper size, each shinsho-ban (新書判) volume featured a larger typeface and in-text furigana to aid elementary-school readers in reading the kanji. Both volumes included new artworks drawn by illustrator Chakotata (ちゃこたた), including the cover artworks (Top's cover featuring Yuta and Bottom's cover featuring Saeko) which were enclosed within an ornate orange frame that is characteristic of Kizuna Bunko books; when both volumes were placed side by side (Top on the left and Bottom on the right), both covers formed a full artwork revealing Yuta and Saeko running on a field while clasping hands together.

No.	Title	Release date	ISBN
	Niji-iro Hotaru: Eien no Natsu Yasumi (虹色ほたる～永遠の夏休み～)	July 30, 2007	978-4-434-10871-6
Original tankōbon (shiroku-ban) hardcover release, under the main AlphaPolis imprint.
上	Niji-iro Hotaru: Eien no Natsu Yasumi, Jō (虹色ほたる～永遠の夏休み～上)	July 20, 2010	978-4-434-14589-6
下	Niji-iro Hotaru: Eien no Natsu Yasumi, Ge (虹色ほたる～永遠の夏休み～下)	July 20, 2010	978-4-434-14590-2
Bunkobon (A6) paperback re-release (split into two "top" and "bottom" volumes), under the AlphaPolis Bunko imprint.
	Niji-iro Hotaru: Eien no Natsu Yasumi (Keisō-ban) (虹色ほたる～永遠の夏休み～ （軽装版）)	March 15, 2012	978-4-434-16513-9
Lightweight Edition: tankōbon paperback re-release, under the main AlphaPolis imprint. Its obi doubled as promotion for the then-upcoming animated film.
上	Niji-iro Hotaru: Jō (虹色ほたる 上)	July 15, 2024	978-4-434-34161-8
下	Niji-iro Hotaru: Ge (虹色ほたる 下)	July 15, 2024	978-4-434-34162-5
Kids' bunkobon (shinsho-ban) paperback edition (split into two "top" and "bottom" volumes), under the AlphaPolis Kizuna Bunko imprint (aimed at young elementary-school readers).

=== Manga ===
A manga adaptation, illustrated by Madoka Asahi, was serialized on the AlphaPolis Web Manga website from July 20 to December 21, 2011, encompassing eleven chapters. These chapters were collected into a single tankōbon paperback volume and published under the AlphaPolis Comics imprint on May 11, 2012, a week before the animated film adaptation, which the manga helped promote, was set to be premiered in theaters.

No.	Title	Release date	ISBN
	Niji-iro Hotaru (虹色ほたる)	May 11, 2012	978-4-434-16654-9
JIS B6 tankōbon paperback release. Its obi also served as promotion for the animated film, which premiered a week later from the release date.

=== Animated film ===
The animated film adaptation by Toei Animation was directed by Kōnosuke Uda, with screenplay written by Kei Kunii and cinematography by Masao Ōnuki. The idea for the film was traced back to producer Atsutoshi Umezawa coming across the original book sometime during the summer of 2007, which then led him to directly approach the president of Toei Animation with a proposal to adapt the novel to film. The animation, directed by Hisashi Mori and based on artworks by Kentarō Akiyama, was drawn entirely by hand, with no use of computer generated graphics; it was characterized by rough lines resembling brush strokes, something rarely seen in traditional animation. The music, which featured a live orchestra with no synthesized sounds, was composed by Masataka Matsutoya; his wife, legendary singer-songwriter Yumi Matsutoya, performed the theme song "Ai to Tōi Hi no Mirai e" (愛と遠い日の未来へ). The voice actors and actresses were picked so as to closely match the ages of the characters.

When asked about the movie, the original author Masayuki Kawaguchi stated that, even while writing the original web novel, they had been dreaming about a film adaptation of it, and seeing the novel get adapted into a movie was considered by them to be the ultimate fulfillment of such a long-held dream.

The movie was screened nationwide in Japanese Toei theaters on May 19, 2012, two months after the lightweight-edition tankōbon re-release of the novel, and a week after the manga adaptation was published. Before the nationwide premiere, a limited online preview screening was held on May 9; in addition, the first 20 minutes of the movie were streamed on YouTube from May 8 to 18.

Staff

- Directed by Kōnosuke Uda
- Based on the original work by Masayuki Kawaguchi
- Screenplay by Kei Kunii
- Character design and animation direction by Hisashi Mori
- Music by Masataka Matsutoya
- Theme song "Ai to Tōi Hi no Mirai e" by Yumi Matsutoya
- Art by Kentarō Akiyama
- Art direction and color design by Seiki Tamura
- Screen design and layout direction by Takaaki Yamashita
- Cinematography by Masao Ōnuki
- Edited by Shinichi Fukumitsu
- Marketing by Noriyuki Taniguchi
- Produced by Hiroshi Takahashi
- Planning by Atsutoshi Umezawa
- Executive producer: Munehisa Higuchi
- Production company: Toei Animation
- Distributed by Toei Company
