= Kazunari Tanaka =

Japanese voice actor

- 田中 一成
- Born: April 8, 1967; Osaka, Japan
- Died: October 10, 2016 (aged 49); Osaka, Japan
- Occupation: Voice actor
- Years active: 1990–2016
- Agent: Aoni Production

Kazunari Tanaka (田中 一成, Tanaka Kazunari; April 8, 1967 – October 10, 2016) was a Japanese voice actor from Osaka Prefecture who worked for Aoni Production.

== Death ==
Tanaka died on October 10, 2016, from intracerebral hemorrhage.

== Filmography ==
=== Television animation ===
- Sailor Moon (1992) (various minor roles)
- Dragon Ball Z (1993) (Maraikoh)
- Marmalade Boy (1994) (Tsutomu Rokutanda)
- Turn A Gundam (1999) (Bruno)
- Planetes (2003) (Hachirota "Hachimaki" Hoshino)
- Rockman EXE Stream (2005) (Rat)
- Haikyū!! (2014) (Keishin Ukai)
- Marvel Disk Wars: The Avengers (2015) (Baron Blood)
- Sailor Moon Crystal (2015) (Achiral)

Unknown date

- Air Gear (Inuyama)
- Air Master (Yashiki Shun)
- Bleach (Abirama Redder)
- Bobobo-bo Bo-bobo (Wonk)
- Brave 10 (Miyoshi Seikai Nyuudou)
- Code Geass (Shinichirō Tamaki)
- Dragoon Might (Reggie, Drake, Sarumaru)
- Gintama (Katoken)
- Green Green (Tadatomo "Bacchi-Gu" Ijūin)
- Hoshin Engi (Ko Hiko)
- InuYasha (Genbu)
- Kaiser Knuckle (known outside Japan as Global Champion) (J.McCoy)
- Konjiki no Gash Bell!! (Hiroshi Yamanaka)
- Magical Girl Pretty Sammy (Boss)
- Mobile Suit Gundam SEED (Orson White)
- One Piece (Talaran, Avalo Pizarro, Brownbeard, Manboshi, Blackback, Yomo)
- Shining Tears X Wind (Enu)
- SD Gundam Sangokuden Brave Battle Warriors (Touton Memedorza)
- Yaiba (Gerozaemon, Kendo Student, Hakki)
- Shippu! Iron Leaguer (Additional Voices)

=== Original video animation ===
- I Shall Never Return (1994) (Kazuyoshi Iwasaki)
- Blue Submarine No. 6 (1998) (Akihiro Ookawa)
- Mobile Suit Gundam MS IGLOO (2004) (Jackson)
- Nasu: A Migratory Bird with Suitcase (2007) (Dagdag)

=== Theatrical animation ===
- Mobile Suit Gundam :Special edition (2000) (Oscar Dublin)
- Mobile Suit Gundam: Soldiers of Sorrow :Special edition (2000) (Oscar Dublin)
- Mobile Suit Gundam: Encounters in Space :Special edition (2000) (Oscar Dublin)
- Doraemon: Nobita and the Windmasters (2003) (Wind Guide A)
- Rainbow Fireflies (2011) (Setsuko's father)

=== Tokusatsu ===
- Mirai Sentai Timeranger (2000) (Hitman Mad Blast (ep. 5))
- Hyakujuu Sentai Gaoranger (2001) (Freezer Org (ep. 13))

=== Video games ===
- Tobal 2 (1997) (Hom)
- Silhouette Mirage (1997) (Grigori Shemhazai)
- Metal Gear Acid 2 (2005) (Harab Serap)
- Bladestorm: The Hundred Years' War (2007) (Jean)
- Shining Wind (2007) (Enu)
- Last Escort 2 (2008) (Kouki)
- Code 18 (2011) (Takeshi Fujii)
- Yakuza 0 (2015) (Wen Hai Lee)
- JoJo's Bizarre Adventure: Eyes of Heaven (2015) (Tamami Kobayashi)
- Persona 5 (2016) (Junya Kaneshiro)

=== Drama CDs ===
- Daisuki (xxxx) (Masayoshi Ikeda)
- Hanayome wa Yoru ni Chiru (xxxx) (Wakana)

=== Dubbing Roles ===
==== Live-action ====
- American Pie Presents: The Naked Mile (Mike "Cooze" Coozeman (Jake Siegel))
- Painkiller Jane (Riley Jensen (Sean Owen Roberts))
- The Recruit (Ronnie Gibson (Mike Realba))

==== Animation ====
- Brother Bear 2 (Kenai)
- South Park: Bigger, Longer & Uncut (Mole)
