= Kaiser Knuckle =

1994 video game

- Japanese arcade flyer of Kaiser Knuckle
- Developer: Taito
- Publisher: Taito
- Designers: Takeshi Kobori (project leader); Hiroshi Aoki (main programmer); Nobuteru Yuki (image illustrator)
- Composer: Yasuhisa Watanabe
- Platform: Arcade
- Release: July 1994; Dan-Ku-Ga: 2022 (Egret II Mini)
- Genre: Fighting game
- Mode: Up to 2 players simultaneously
- Arcade system: Taito F3 System

Kaiser Knuckle (カイザーナックル, Kaizā Nakkuru), known outside of Japan as Global Champion, is a 1994 fighting game released for the arcades by Taito. Kaiser Knuckle was released during the fighting game trend of the 1990s that began with Capcom's Street Fighter II. It is included as part of the Taito Egret II mini console, marking its first re-release outside arcades.

== Gameplay ==
Gameplay screenshot showcasing a match between Kazuya and Lihua.

Kaiser Knuckle follows the fighting game conventions established by Street Fighter II, in which the player's character fights against opponents in a best two-out-of-three match round format from within a single player tournament mode, either with the computer or against another human player in versus mode. The player has a character roster of nine initially selectable fighters to choose from and three unplayable computer-controlled bosses, each with their own unique fighting style and special techniques. The control layout is set to the six-button standard (as with most Capcom fighting games), but it can be switched to a five-button layout via dip settings.

Another unique feature is that it introduced the power zones, which can be utilized via a successful hit of a special move when a player's "Crush Meter" is full. The power zones (either fire or electric) can also affect a certain special move that a character has. Backgrounds can be destructible when players get hit to charge up, and when those meters are full, the next special move that a player connects with an opponent will destroy the background's properties at will (other parts of stages, such as floors and walls are also destructible).

== Characters ==
There are nine playable characters, and three unplayable bosses.

- Kazuya – a karateka from Japan. Kazuya seeks to win the tournament so that he can not only gain the prize money, but impress some women.
- Barts – Kazuya's presumed rival (who he's seen clashing with in a TV commercial for the game). a mixed martial artist and biker from the USA, Barts is determined to win the tournament's prize money so that he can help fund a medical operation for his girlfriend Sarah, who was injured in a motorcycle accident.
- Lihua – a swordswoman from Taiwan, Lihua seeks to win the tournament in the hopes of locating her missing mother and father.
- Wulong – a Chinese martial artist and detective, he has black scratch marks on his cheeks. Wulong enters the tournament to win the prize money and use it to pay a debt to a Chinese criminal group that he knows well.
- Liza – an Amazonian jungle girl from Brazil, accompanied by a monkey and a green cockatoo, Liza heads to the tournament in the hopes of winning the prize money so that she can buy a new exotic costume for the Rio Carnival.
- Boggy – an African-American breakdancer from the USA, Boggy is determined to win the tournament so that he can advance his dancing career.
- Gekkou – a ninja from Japan, Gekkou seeks to win the tournament so that he can gain the secrets of his ninjutsu style from his master.
- Jim McCoy – a boxer from the USA, McCoy seeks to win the tournament so that he can use the prize money to help gain him a title shot against the current boxing heavyweight champion.
- Marco – a mutated human from Germany, his face is wrapped in bandages so only one of his eyeballs is visible, his skin is purple and covered in stitches, and his clothes including his shoes are ragged and worn out. Marco heads to the tournament in the hopes of winning the prize money so that he can help fund a science research that could enable him to become a normal human.

Bosses

- Gonzales – a judoka from Russia, he is often seen wearing a karate suit and a coonskin cap. Gonzales participates in the tournament so that he can attempt to locate his missing fiancée Tanya, who was separated from him after a civil war in their hometown.
- Azteca – an Aztec warrior from Mexico, Azteca participates in the tournament so that he can attempt to regain his own lost memories.
- General – the final boss and titular "Kaiser Knuckle", who is the commander of a space station in orbit. General is the sponsor of "The Kaiser Knuckle" tournament, but his reasons for holding the competition in the first place is shrouded in mystery.

== Other versions ==
=== Global Champion ===
Global Champion is a modified USA version of Kaiser Knuckle, the Japanese and European versions. Global Champion has the "Recycle It, Don't Trash It!" screen, the "super moves" were cut, and the portraits of Kazuya, Liza and Lihua were re-drawn. After players choose their characters and their first opponents, they will then be able to see an intro sequence that shows the prologue of their chosen character's own personal story. The title screen is also different as well, but strangely, the letter "K" from both words in the Kaiser Knuckle logo can still be seen in some of Global Champion's backgrounds.

=== Dan-Ku-Ga ===
An updated version of Kaiser Knuckle was planned to be released in December 1994 as Dan-Ku-Ga (断仇牙), but it was later discontinued; the prototype itself was dumped onto the Internet as a ROM and was later included with Taito Egret II Mini console released in 2022. This version allows the first two bosses, Gonzales and Azteca, to become playable characters. Players can no longer choose their first opponent in a one-player game, except on the Training difficulty level.

Other differences are the CPU AI being altered; players choose the difficulty level (Normal, Professional or Training) before their game; players can backdash with all characters; Gonzales becomes the 5th opponent, Azteca becomes the 9th and the doppelgänger of the selected character becomes the 10th; Kazuya, Lihua and Liza have been redesigned on the character select screen; all characters each have a third costume color; some of the basic attacks that are executed with two punch or kick buttons were taken out, but the rest are still present, being executed with a single button plus a joystick direction; and the third boss, General, can now be fought against without meeting certain conditions.

Additionally, Kaiser Knuckle 2 (カイザーナックル2) was also planned as a sequel to the original arcade board, intending to make the full transition to 3D, but the planning board itself was later canceled. The entire project would soon be retitled as Psychic Force, replacing the old models with new ones.

== Reception ==
Game Machine also listed Kaiser Knuckle on their October 15, 1994 issue as being the twelfth most-successful table arcade unit of the month. Retrospective reception of the game focused on the game's final boss, General, who is considered as the hardest boss character in all of fighting games.
