= Luc Besson filmography =

Luc Besson is a French film director, writer and producer. He has contributed to many projects as either writer, director, producer, or a combination of the three.

== Films ==
=== As director ===
Year	Film	Credited as			Rotten Tomatoes	Notes
Year	Film	Director	Writer	Producer	Rotten Tomatoes	Notes
1981	L'Avant Dernier	Yes	Yes	Yes		Short film
1983	Le Dernier Combat	Yes	Yes	Yes	70%	
1985	Subway	Yes	Yes	Yes	75%	
1988	The Big Blue	Yes	Yes	Co-producer uncredited	63%	
1990	La Femme Nikita	Yes	Yes	Yes	88%	
1991	Atlantis^{[I]}	Yes	Yes	Yes		
1994	Léon: The Professional	Yes	Yes	Co-producer uncredited	74%	
1997	The Fifth Element	Yes	Yes	No	71%	
1999	The Messenger: The Story of Joan of Arc	Yes	Yes	Co-producer	30%	
2005	Angel-A	Yes	Yes	Yes	44%	
2006	Arthur and the Minimoys	Yes	Yes	Yes	21%	
2009	Arthur and the Revenge of Maltazard	Yes	Yes	Yes	14%	
2010	The Extraordinary Adventures of Adèle Blanc-Sec	Yes	Yes	Associate	83%	
2010	Arthur 3: The War of the Two Worlds	Yes	Yes	Yes	20%	
2011	The Lady	Yes	No	No	33%	
2013	The Family (also known as Malavita)	Yes	Yes	Yes	29%	
2014	Lucy	Yes	Yes	Yes	66%	
2015	Save Kids Lives	Yes	No	No		
2017	Valerian and the City of a Thousand Planets	Yes	Yes	Yes	48%	
2019	Anna	Yes	Yes	Yes	33%	
2023	Dogman	Yes	Yes	Yes	62%	
2025	June and John	Yes	Yes	No		
2025	Dracula	Yes	Yes	No	73%	

1. Also credited as cinematographer and film editor.
2. Credited as camera operator.

=== As writer and producer ===
Year	Film	Credited as		Rotten Tomatoes	Notes
Year	Film	Writer	Producer	Rotten Tomatoes	Notes
1986	Kamikaze	Yes	Yes		
1991	Cold Moon	No	Yes		
1997	Nil by Mouth	No	Yes	65%	
1998	Taxi	Yes	Yes		
2000	Trasgredire (also known as Cheeky)	No	Yes		
2000	Taxi 2	Yes	Yes		
2000	The Dancer	Yes	Yes		
2001	Yamakasi	Yes	No		
2001	15 August	No	Yes		
2001	Kiss of the Dragon	Yes	Yes	51%	
2001	Wasabi	Yes	Yes	43%	
2002	Chaos and Desire	No	Yes	56%	
2002	The Transporter	Yes	Yes	54%	
2003	Ong-Bak	No	Executive	86%	uncredited
2003	Taxi 3	Yes	Yes		
2003	I, Cesar	No	Co-producer		uncredited
2003	Fanfan la Tulipe	Yes	Yes	17%	
2003	Les Côtelettes	No	Yes		
2003	Michel Vaillant	Yes	Co-producer		
2004	Crimson Rivers II: Angels of the Apocalypse	Yes	No		
2004	À ton image	No	Associate		uncredited
2004	Taxi	No	Yes	10%	
2004	District 13	Yes	Yes	80%	
2005	Unleashed (also known as Danny the Dog)	Yes	Yes	65%	
2005	Bunker Paradise	No	Yes		
2005	Imposture	No	Yes		
2005	The Three Burials of Melquiades Estrada	No	Yes	85%	
2005	Transporter 2	Yes	Yes	51%	
2005	Revolver	Yes	Yes	17%	
2005	Colour Me Kubrick	No	Executive	52%	
2005	The Black Box	No	Executive		uncredited
2005	Ze film	No	Yes		
2005	Au suivant!	No	Yes		
2006	Bandidas	Yes	Yes	62%	
2006	When I Was a Singer	No	Executive	94%	
2006	Dikkenek	No	Executive		
2006	Golden Door (also known as Nuovomondo)	No	Yes	72%	
2006	Love and Other Disasters	No	Executive	20%	
2006	Tell No One	No	Yes	94%	
2007	Michou d'Auber	No	Yes		
2007	L'Invité	No	Yes		
2007	Taxi 4	Yes	Yes		
2007	Frontier(s)	No	Co-producer	55%	
2007	The Secret	No	Yes		
2007	Hitman	No	Yes	14%	
2008	Taken	Yes	Yes	58%	
2008	Transporter 3	Yes	Yes	37%	
2009	I Love You Phillip Morris	No	Executive	72%	
2009	District 13: Ultimatum	Yes	Yes	74%	
2009	Home	No	Co-producer	0%	
2009	Staten Island	No	Yes	22%	
2010	From Paris with Love	Yes	Yes	37%	
2010	22 Bullets	No	Yes	42%	
2011	The Source	No	Yes	63%	
2011	Colombiana	Yes	Yes	27%	
2011	A Monster in Paris	No	Yes	85%	
2012	Lockout	Yes	Yes	38%	
2012	Taken 2	Yes	Yes	21%	
2013	Collision (also known as Intersections)	No	Yes		
2013	Jack and the Cuckoo-Clock Heart	No	Yes	77%	
2014	3 Days to Kill	Yes	Yes	32%	
2014	Brick Mansions	Yes	Yes	27%	
2014	The Homesman	No	Yes	81%	
2014	Taken 3	Yes	Yes	11%	
2015	The Transporter Refueled	Yes	Yes	16%	
2016	The Warriors Gate	Yes	Yes	43%	Co-writer
2017	Renegades	Yes	Yes	6%	
2018	Taxi 5	Yes	Yes	0%	
2022	Arthur, malédiction	Yes	Yes	17%	
2024	Weekend in Taipei	Yes	Yes	52%	
2026	Down the Arm of God	No	Yes		
TBA	Father Joe	Yes	Yes		

1. Credited as camera operator.

== Television ==
Years		Series	Credited as		Ratings	Notes
Start	End	Series	Writer	Producer	Ratings	Notes
2012	2014	Transporter: The Series	No	Yes		
2012	2015	No Limit	Yes	Yes		

== Bibliography ==
- Hayward, Susan (1998). Luc Besson. Manchester University Press. ISBN 0719050766.
- "Luc Besson > Filmography". Allmovie.
- "Luc Besson Official Website". luc-besson.com. Archived from the original on 31 May 2013.
