= Andrzej Malinowski =

Polish artist (born 1947)

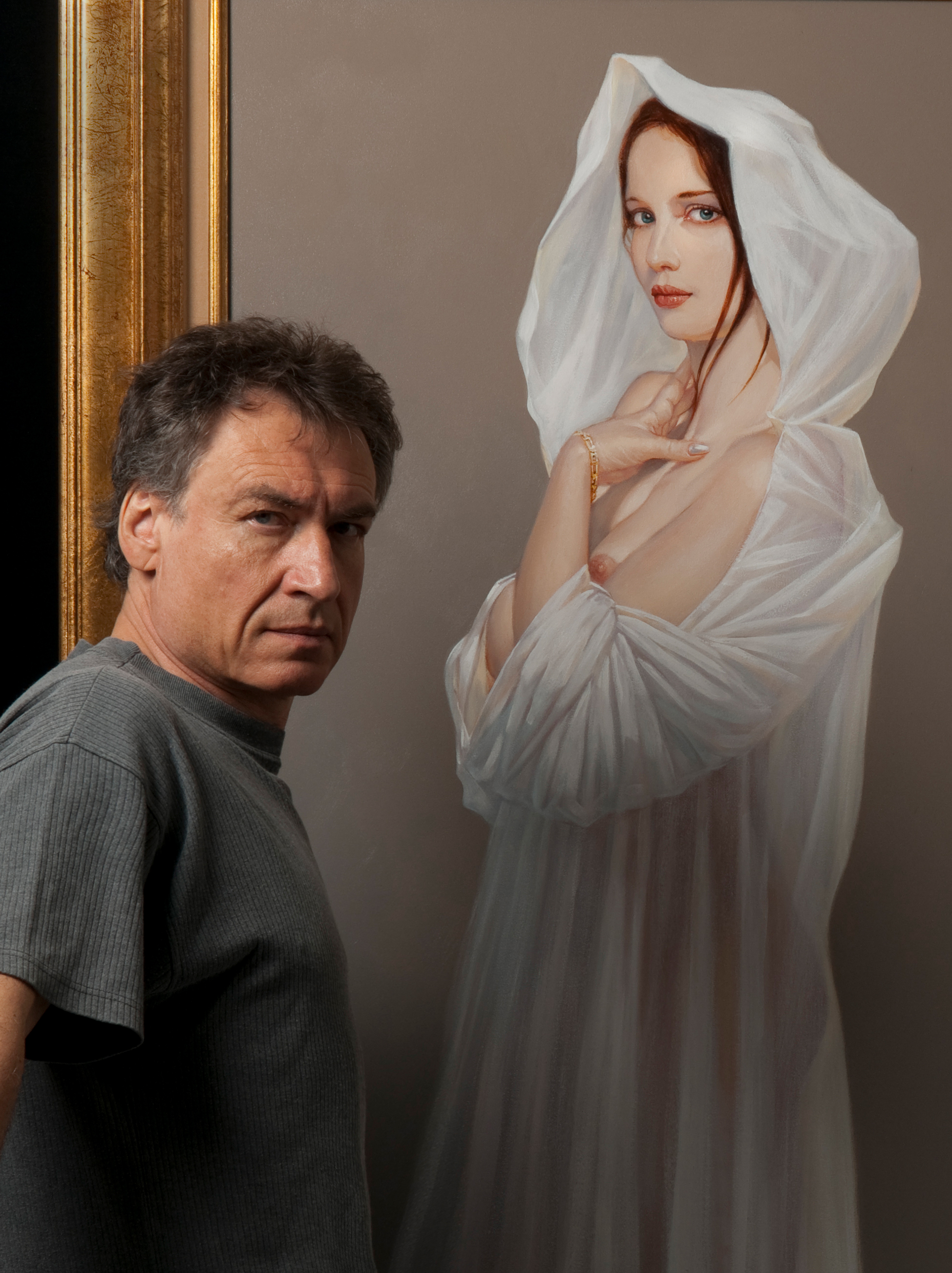
- Malinowski, 2009
- Born: 1947 (age 77–78); Warsaw, Poland
- Education: Academy of Fine Arts in Warsaw
- Occupation(s): Painter, graphic designer, illustrator, poster creator
- Website: Official website

Andrzej Malinowski (born in 1947) is a Polish artist, painter, graphic designer, illustrator, and poster creator. He resides and works in France.

== Biography ==
In his youth, Andrzej Malinowski drew inspiration from the works of Vermeer and Rembrandt. In 1973, he graduated from the Warsaw Academy of Fine Arts in the Illustration Department. After obtaining his diploma, he moved to Paris, where he continues to live and create. In 1982, he was granted French citizenship.

During the initial period of his stay in France, Malinowski was engaged in artistic direction, creating audiovisual presentations, television programs, graphics, illustrations, and posters. During this time, he won awards in the field of posters and illustrations. In 1977, he received the First Prize for the poster for the film The Exorcist at the Deauville Film Festival, as reported, among others, by French newspaper Le Parisien.

Andrzej Malinowski collaborated with the most prominent film directors. Those include:

- Andrei Tarkovsky (Nostalghia, 1983),
- Jerzy Skolimowski (Success Is the Best Revenge, 1984),
- Andrzej Wajda (The Possessed, 1988),
- Luc Besson (The Big Blue, 1988),
- Paolo and Vittorio Taviani (Il sole anche di notte, 1989),
- Kenneth Branagh (Henry V, 1989),
- Bernardo Bertolucci (The Sheltering Sky, 1990),
- Jean-Jacques Beineix (IP5: L'île aux pachydermes, 1992, Mortal Transfer, 2001).

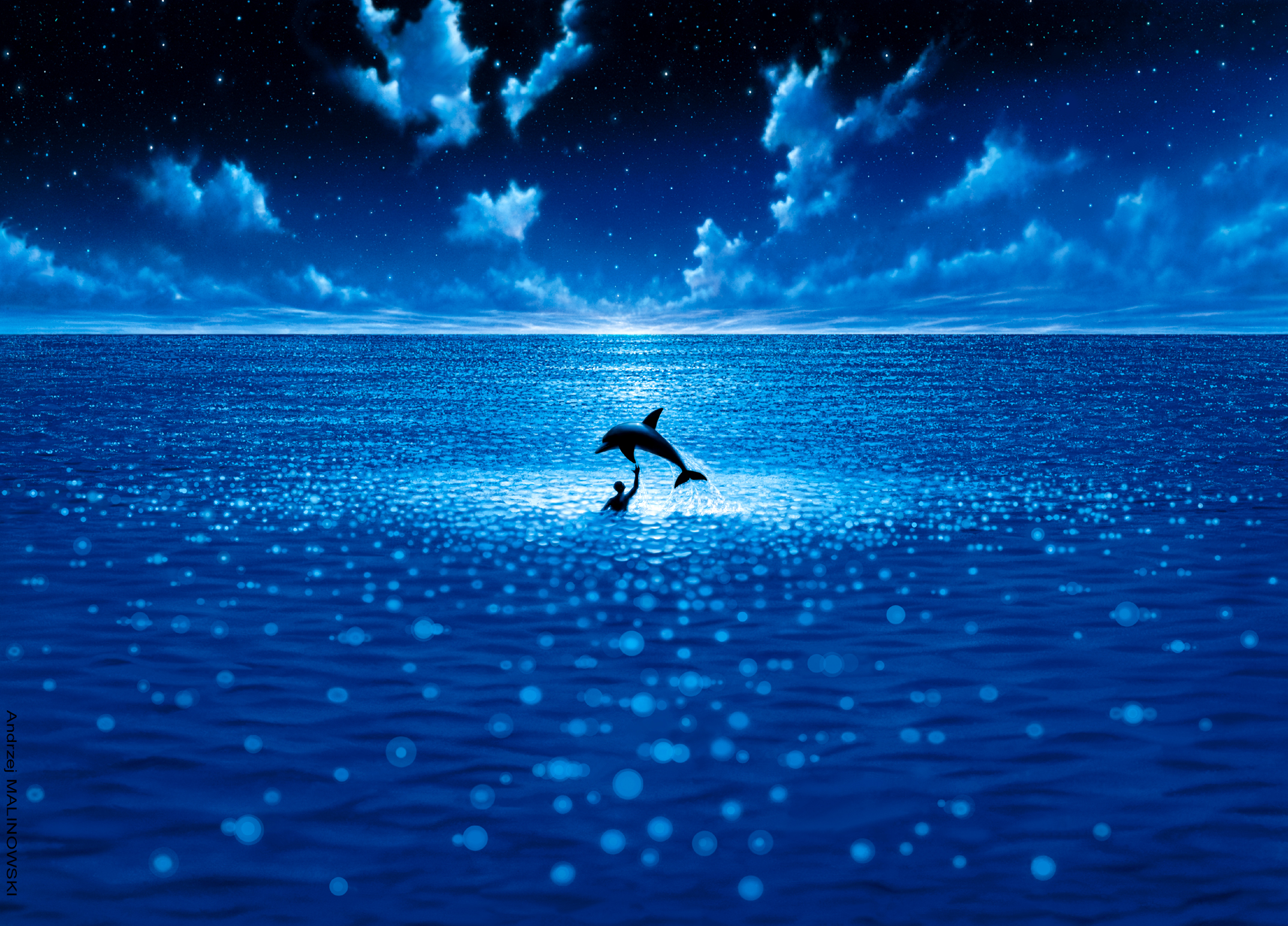
A movie poster for The Big Blue.

The artist gained international recognition for his movie poster for The Big Blue, directed by Luc Besson, for which Malinowski received a Cesar Award nomination in 1989 from the French Academy of Arts and Film Techniques.

"Nostalgia has a significant influence on the artist's work. Everything that surrounds us from early childhood, memories not only of the beautiful moments but also the painful ones, shapes our personality."

— Malinowski, interview for the quarterly magazine Artysta i Sztuka.

Andrzej Malinowski served as the president of various French artistic organizations, including being the head of the jury for the competition "Le plus beau dessin pour le Planétarium" in Paris. In the 1980s, he created covers and graphics for the French magazine L'Express and major newspaper Le Monde.

He was the head of the jury for the National "Film Poster" Competition of the French group Caisse d'Epargne. From 1983 to 1986, he was the vice president of the French Illustrators' Union.

Since 1986, Malinowski has been a member of the jury for the most important French film award competition, the César Awards.

Malinowski was the Chairman of the Jury of the Chalon sur Saône Film Image Festival in 1989 and 1990. He was responsible for the artistic direction and illustrations for two programs titled Franchir Espace in 1989 (screened at the "Planetarium 360°" in Paris) commissioned by the French Ministry of Culture.

He was the artistic director of the television program My City Concerns Me. He was invited by the media company Canal+ to prepare the program Nulle part Ailleurs (1990), which was broadcast during prime-time.

He collaborated with the international artistic group "Libellule." He participated multiple times in the Paris Salons ("Art en Capital" at the Grand Palais). Since the early nineties, Malinowski has been exclusively engaged in easel painting.

== Work as a painter and legacy ==
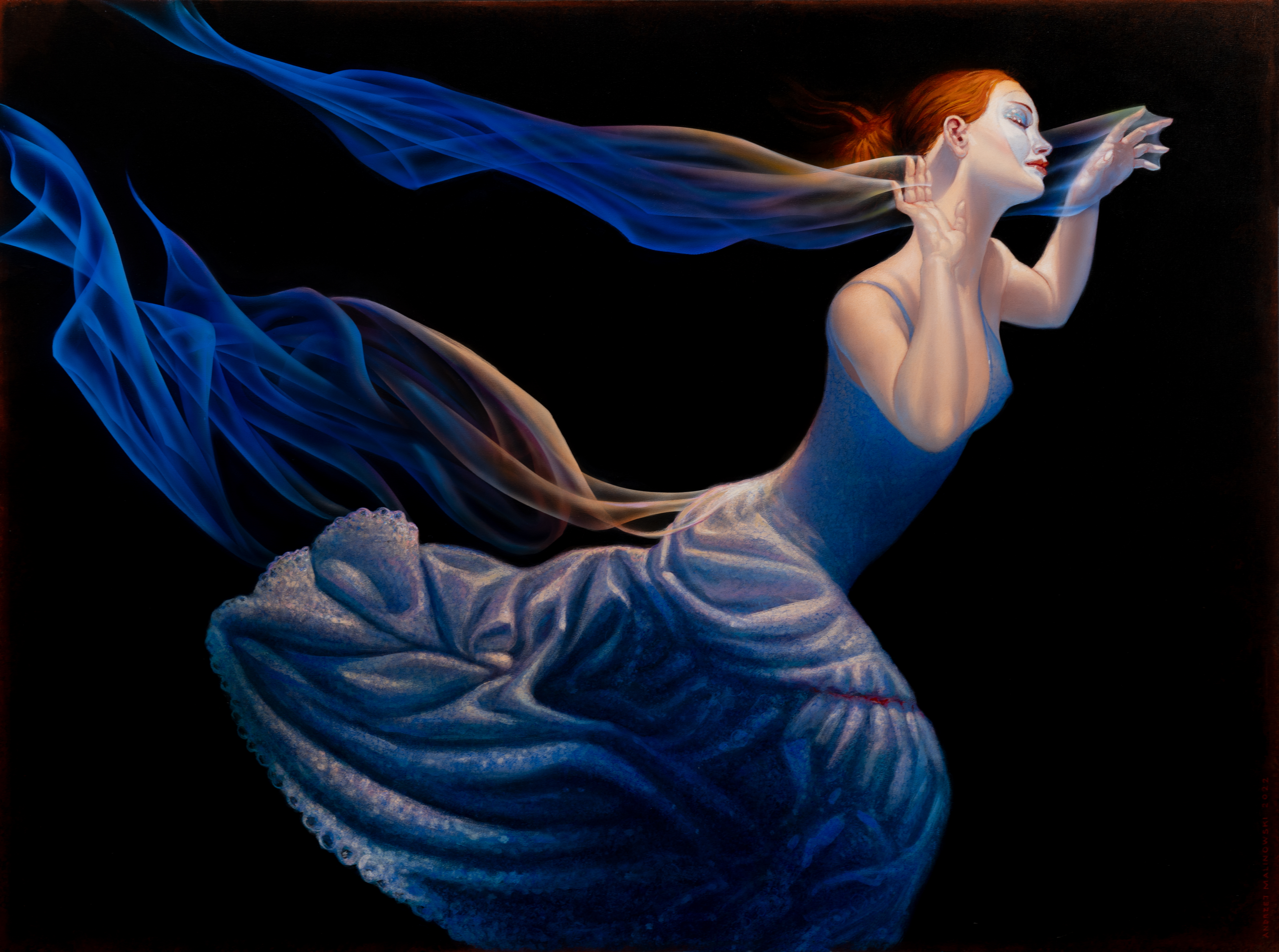
"Blue Fugue", Andrzej Malinowski, 2022.

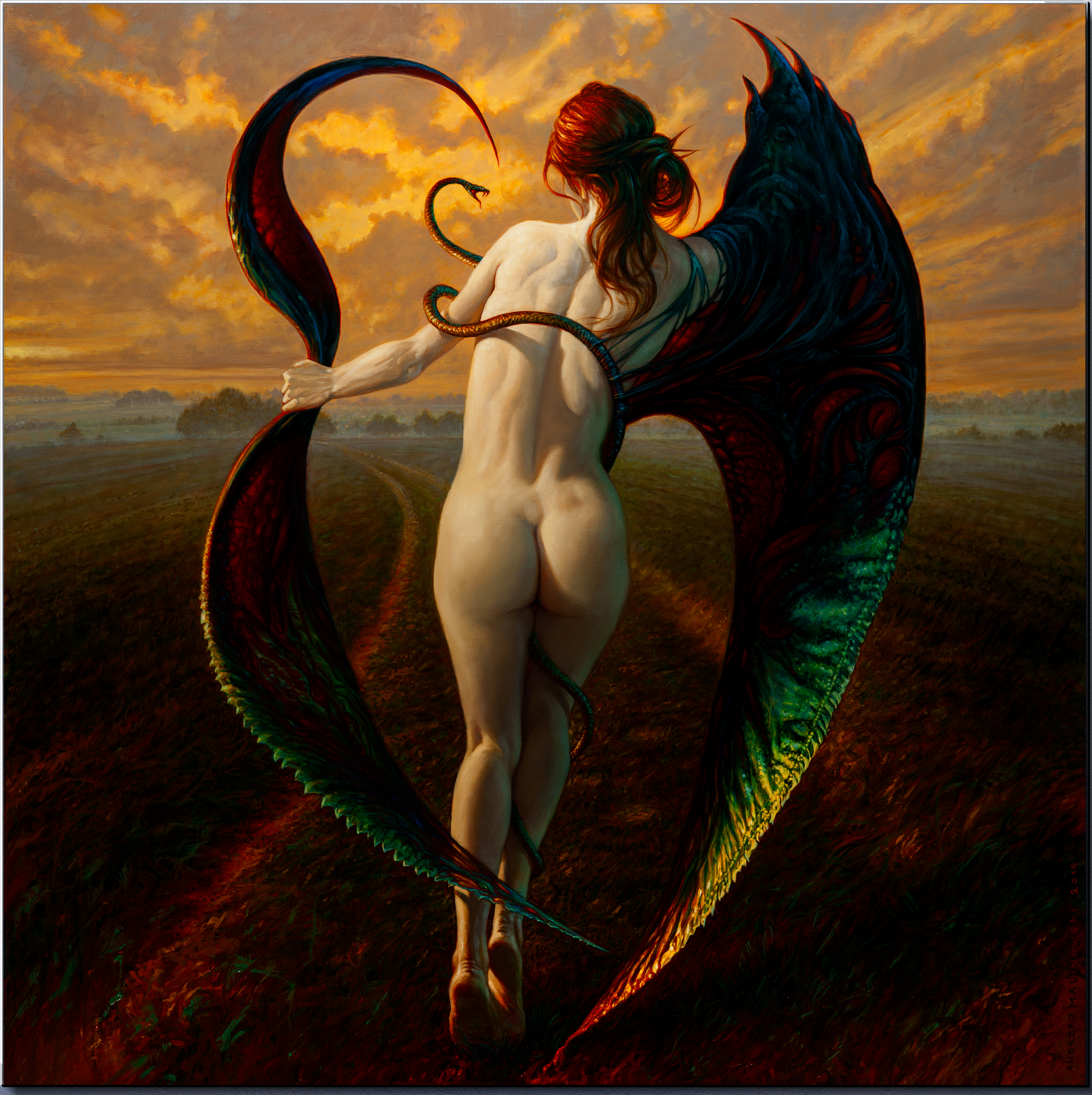
"Dawn", Andrzej Malinowski, 2014.

The main features of Malinowski's paintings are unique character choreography, subtle expression, rare composition, play of light and shadow, and a richness of colors. A frequent motif is the figure of a woman. In his works, the artist also makes references to his Polish identity.

From November 2008 to March 2009, Malinowski's works were exhibited at the Louis Senelecq National Museum – Lartigue Center. This was a solo exhibition titled "Silences," featuring sixty works by the artist. The exhibition was covered in publications such as the French-language magazine Azart – Le Magazine International de La Peinture.

Malinowski's paintings are displayed in galleries in Paris, the US, Argentina, and Japan. The artist's works are found in prestigious galleries such as Galeries Bartoux and Marciano Contemporary on Champs Elysées. His first solo exhibition in Poland (titled Returns) took place in 2022 at the Adam Rajzer Rzeszów Art House.

In 2005, the work of Malinowski was described by the French critic Thierry Sznytka in the pages of the magazine Arts – Actualités Magazine. In 2008, Valère-Marie Marchand also wrote about Malinowski's painting in the same magazine. Articles about Malinowski were also featured in Artistes en Direct (a magazine for leading illustrators) and Salon Artistique.

Recognized by the magazine Artysta i Sztuka for his "nonconformist, bold artistic approach" and "intense, thought-provoking technique," Malinowski is acknowledged both as a painter who has achieved "worldwide success", and as a poster artist who collaborated with top-class directors (Tarkovsky, Bertolucci, Besson, among others).

== Awards ==
- 1977, Deauville Film Festival – First Prize for the poster of the film The Exorcist
- 3 First Prizes Marker d'Argent – Mecanorma trophy
- Amnesty International Poster
- Honorary Guest JCA – Japan
- Grand Prix Martini
- 1995, 46th Le Salon de L'Artistique – Audience Award
