= Wang Jiaxiang (translator) =

Chinese translator

- 王家湘
- Born: September 1936 (age 89–90); Wuxi, Jiangsu, China
- Education: Beijing Foreign Studies University
- Occupation: Translator
- Writing career
- Language: Chinese, English
- Notable work: Uncle Tom's Cabin

Wang Jiaxiang (Chinese: 王家湘; pinyin: Wáng Jiāxiāng; born September 1936) is a Chinese translator of Black American literature and female literature. She was a professor at Beijing Foreign Studies University.

== Biography ==
Wang was born in Wuxi, Jiangsu, in September 1936. Due to the Second Sino-Japanese War, she was raised in southwest China's Sichuan, Guizhou and Guangxi provinces. In the summer of 1947, her family moved to Nanjing, where she secondary studied at Mingde Girls' High School. In 1948, her family relocated to Shanghai, she entered Xuhui Girls' High School in the following year. On July 1, 1949, her family moved to Beijing and she studied at Beiman Girls' High School. In 1953, Wang studied, then taught, at what is now Beijing Foreign Studies University. In 1982 she earned her Master of Arts in English literature from Griffith University. She studied at Cornell University as a Ruth scholar in 1986 and studied at the W. E. B. Du Bois Institute of Harvard University in 1998.

== Work ==
- 黑色火焰：20世纪美国黑人小说史 [Black Flame: History of Black American Novels in the 20th Century] (in Chinese). Zhejiang: Zhejiang Literature and Art Publishing House. 2017. ISBN 9787533949174.
- Wang Jiaxiang; Henry Louis Gates Jr. (2011). 有色人民——回忆录 [Colored People: A Memoir] (in Chinese). Beijing: Peking University Press. ISBN 9787301178164.

== Translations ==
- Uncle Tom's Cabin (汤姆叔叔的小屋)
- A Dog of Flanders (佛兰德斯的狗)
- The Sense of Wonder (惊奇之心)
- Three Days To See (假如给我三天光明)
- Jacob's Room (雅各布之屋)
- Speak, Memory (说吧，记忆)
- Walden (瓦尔登湖)

== Papers ==
- A Preliminary Study of the Works of Tony Morrison, a Black Female Writer (黑人女作家托尼·莫里森作品初探) (1988)
- On Alice Walker's Novel Art (论爱丽丝·沃克的小说艺术) (1988)
- In the Shadow of Richard Wright: Two African-American Female Writers in the 1930s and 1940s: Zola Neil Hurston and Ann Patry (在理查德·赖特的阴影下——三四十年代的两位美国黑人女作家佐拉·尼尔·赫斯顿和安·佩特里) (1989)

== Awards ==
- 2014 Colored People: A Memoir (有色人民——回忆录) won the 6th Lu Xun Literature Prize for Translation
- 2016 Chinese Translation Association - "Senior Translator"
