= Kamikaze (1986 film) =

- Theatrical release poster
- Directed by: Didier Grousset
- Written by: Didier Grousset; Luc Besson
- Produced by: Luc Besson; Louis Duchesne; Laurent Pétin
- Starring: Richard Bohringer
- Cinematography: Jean-François Robin
- Edited by: Olivier Mauffroy
- Music by: Éric Serra
- Distributed by: Gaumont Distribution
- Release date: 10 December 1986 (France)
- Running time: 90 minutes
- Country: France
- Language: French

Kamikaze is a 1986 French science fiction film directed by Didier Grousset.

== Plot ==
Albert, a brilliant but under-appreciated research scientist gets fired from his job. Spending his time at home, he goes insane and develops a technology that enables him to kill people by sending death rays through television cameras. He kills TV announcers and is soon hunted by police.

== Cast ==
- Richard Bohringer as Romain Pascot
- Michel Galabru as Albert
- Dominique Lavanant as Laure Frontenac
- Romane Bohringer as Julie
- Étienne Chicot as Samrat
- Riton Liebman as Olive
- Harry Cleven as Patrick
- Michael Goldman as Trevor
- Kim Massee as Léa
- Jean-Paul Muel as governement minister
- Charles Gérard as cop
- Beate Kopp as Béate
- Laurent Spielvogel as TV director
- Michel Pilorgé as TV journalist

== Reception ==
Time Out called the film "ambitious if somewhat slim satire" and "stylish fun."

== Production ==
Luc Besson co-wrote and produced Kamikaze right after Subway.

== Soundtrack ==
Two pieces have been published on a single in 1986.

== Home media ==
Kamikaze was originally released on VHS. In 2013 a digitally re-mastered HD French-language version with Japanese subtitles (NTSC, region 2) was issued.
