= The Great Bank Hoax =

1978 film

- Theatrical release poster
- Directed by: Joseph Jacoby
- Written by: Joseph Jacoby
- Produced by: Joseph Jacoby; Ralph Rosenblum
- Starring: Richard Basehart; Ned Beatty; Charlene Dallas; Burgess Meredith; Michael Murphy; Paul Sand; Arthur Godfrey
- Cinematography: Walter Lassally
- Edited by: Ralph Rosenblum
- Music by: Arthur B. Rubinstein
- Distributed by: Warner Bros. Pictures
- Release dates: September 6, 1977 (Deauville); November 1978 (United States)
- Running time: 87 minutes
- Country: United States
- Language: English

The Great Bank Hoax is a 1977 American comedy film written and directed by Joseph Jacoby. The film stars Richard Basehart, Ned Beatty, Charlene Dallas, Burgess Meredith, Michael Murphy, Paul Sand and Constance Forslund.

== Plot ==
There is intrigue and deception at a small-town bank when it is discovered that an unsuspecting employee (Paul Sand) has embezzled $109,000 while acting as chief clerk. Fearing a public scandal could lead to the collapse of the bank despite the insurance coverage, bank officers Jack Stutz (Burgess Meredith) and Manny Benchly (Richard Basehart) decide to hide the theft in a seemingly clever plot that will make them even more money. However, when word of the crime gets out, the whole community becomes outraged and gets involved, resulting in plenty of trouble.

== Cast ==
- Richard Basehart as Manny Benchly
- Ned Beatty as Julius Taggart
- Charlene Dallas as Cathy Bonano
- Burgess Meredith as Jack Stutz
- Michael Murphy as Reverend Everett Manigma
- Paul Sand as Richard Smedley
- Constance Forslund as Patricia Allison Potter
- Arthur Godfrey as Major William Bryer Ret.
- John C. Becher as Alex Kaiser
- Guy Le Bow as The Sheriff
- John Lefkowitz as Deputy Bert
- Bibi Osterwald as Sara Pennyworth
- Alek Primrose as Rev. De Verite
- Martha Sherrill as Louise Farthington
- Roy Tatum as Deputy Jason

== Production ==
The film was financed by Georgia investors and filmed in Madison, Georgia. Warner Bros. Pictures picked the film up for US distribution.

It was previously known as Remember Those Poker-Playing Monkeys and Shenanigans.

== Release ==
The film was screened at the 1977 Deauville American Film Festival and the Virgin Islands Film Festival. Its premiere was in Atlanta, Georgia under the title The Great Georgia Bank Hoax.
