= Robert Croft (diver) =

American freediver and US Navy diving instructor (1934–2026)

Bob Croft

Robert Arthur Croft (July 19, 1934 – January 9, 2026) was an American free-diver who, in 1967, became the first person to free-dive beyond the depth of 200 feet. Croft was a US Navy diving instructor in 1962 at the US Naval Submarine Base New London submarine school in Groton, Connecticut. At the submarine escape training tank, instructors train prospective submariners how to escape from a disabled submarine, which could be resting on the sea bottom.

== Freediving career ==
Working five hours per day, five days a week at the 118-feet deep 250,000-gallon submarine escape training tank provided him an opportunity to salve his curiosity about holding his breath underwater. From an initial breath-hold time of 11/2 to 2 minutes, after a year he was able to hold his breath for over 6 minutes, dropping to the bottom of the tank and sitting there for over three minutes and then returning to the surface at a relaxed pace. With that high level of comfort, he wanted to see how far he could go beyond the 118-feet depth.

In 1967, at the encouragement of his fellow instructors, Croft set out to discover how deep he could dive while holding his breath. Over an 18-month period, in competition with Jacques Mayol and Enzo Majorca, he established three depth records:

- 212 feet (64 m) in 1967 – becoming the first person to ever dive beyond 200 feet while breath-holding, which at the time scientists believed was the physiological depth limit for breath-hold diving
- 217 feet (66 m) in 1968
- 240 feet (73 m) in 1968

He retired from free-diving thereafter.

Croft is credited with inventing "air packing" (also known as "lung packing" or "glossopharyngeal inhalation"), a method used to overfill the lungs, increasing the volume of air in the lungs above the total lung capacity prior to breath-holding. He had developed this method as a youngster living in Narraganset Bay, Rhode Island, to swim further and stay underwater longer than any of his peers.

He also served as a research subject for 6 years, from 1962 to 1968, for the Navy research scientists. One of the navy research teams, Dr Karl Schaefer (US Navy) and Dr Robert Allison of the Scott White clinic in Tempel Texas, had done research on diving mammals that demonstrated that air-breathing animals could go to half a mile and deeper without experiencing thoracic squeeze. The discovery of the "blood shift" phenomenon opened a host of theories regarding free diving humans. Croft served as that research subject to determine if that same "blood shift" occurred in humans and measure it. This led to the published study: Schaefer, Karl E., Allison, Robert D., Dougherty, James H., Jr., Carey, Charles R., Walker, Roger, Yost, Frank, & Parker, Donald (1968). Pulmonary and circulatory adjustments determining the limits of depths in breathhold diving. Science, 162(857), 1020-3 .

== Other ventures ==
Croft also qualified as a navy deep sea diver on air in 1968, and mixed gas in 1972.

In the early 1970s, like many navy divers, he was also certified as a NAUI instructor.

== Personal life and death ==
Croft was born in Manhattan, New York, on July 19, 1934. In 1980, he retired from the US Navy, after 22 years of service as a submariner starting in 1951. He died in Lebanon, Pennsylvania on January 9, 2026, at the age of 91.
