= Enzo Maiorca =

Italian free diver

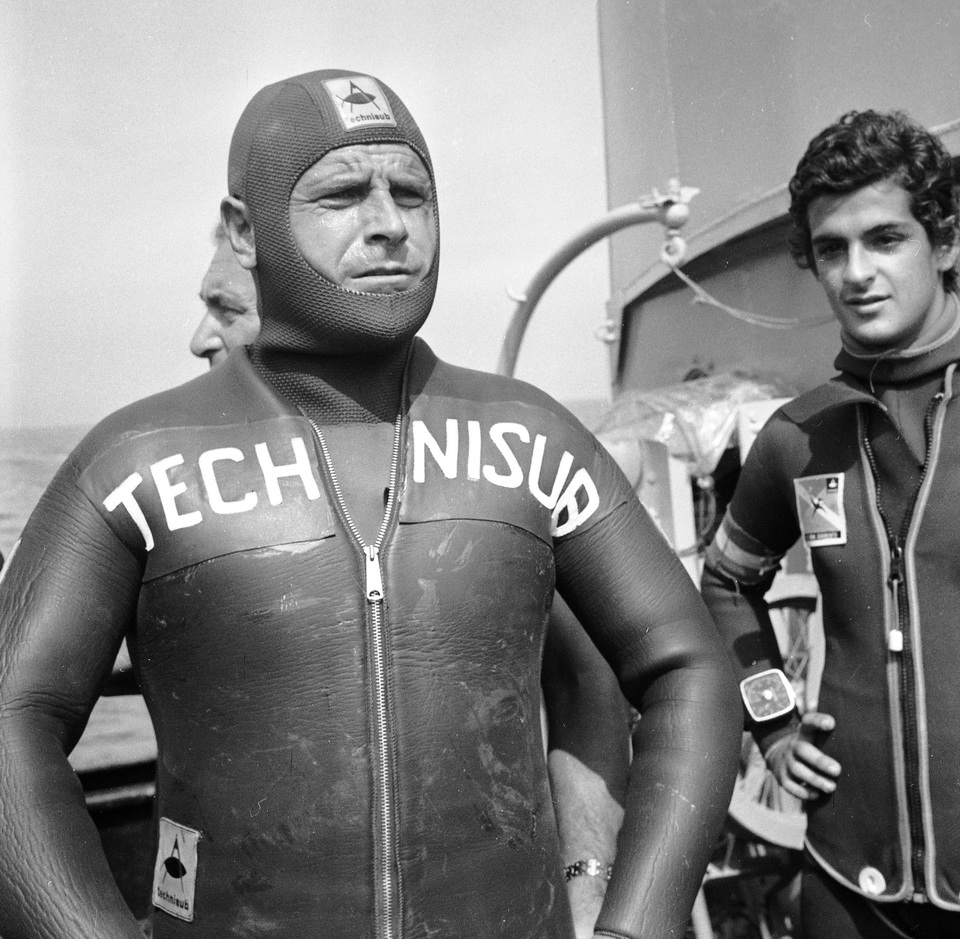
- Maiorca in 1974.

Personal information
- Nationality: Italian
- Born: 21 June 1931 Syracuse, Kingdom of Italy
- Died: 13 November 2016 (aged 85) Syracuse, Italy

Sport
- Sport: Freediving

Enzo Maiorca (21 June 1931 – 13 November 2016) was an Italian free diver who held several world freediving records. Born Vincenzo Maiorca on 21 June 1931 in Syracuse, Sicily, he died on 13 November 2016 in the same city.

== Biography ==
Maiorca was born in Syracuse, Sicily, where he also died in 2016. Maiorca was a vegetarian.

In 1977, Maiorca was initiated into Scottish Rite Freemasonry at the "Archimede di Siracusa" Lodge in Italy. With the agreement of the Grand Orient of Italy lodge, this element of his biography was publicly revealed in 2017. Maiorca was fundemental is establishing the Plemmirio Marine Sanctuary, a 2500 hectare reserve southwest of Siracusa.

== Freediving ==
Maiorca learned to swim at age 4 and soon began to dive, although expressing a great fear of the sea. In 1956 a friend showed him an article about a new depth record of 41 meters set by spearfishing champions Ennio Falco and Alberto Novelli. Maiorca was led by the article to begin competing in order to achieve the title of the "man who reaches the deepest." He achieved this in 1960, when he reached 45 metres to beat Brazilian Américo Santarelli. That same year, however, Santarelli reclaimed the title by reaching 46 metres, which Maiorca soon surpassed at 49 metres.

In 1967 Maiorca ceased spearfishing, while still competing in freediving. He explained in an interview why he abandoned spearfishing:

"It all happened suddenly. I was diving in the shallows not far from the cape that reaches out to the open sea south of the bay of Syracuse. That morning I happened to spear a grouper. A strong and combative grouper. On the bottom a real titanic struggle broke out, between me who wanted to take its life and the grouper who tried to save itself. The grouper was caught in a cavity between two rocks; trying to understand its position, I ran my right hand down the fish's belly. Its heart was pounding in terror, mad with fear. And with that pulsing of blood I realized that I was killing a living being. Since then my speargun lies like a derelict, an archaeological item, in the dusty basement of my house. That was in 1967."

On 22 September 1974, in the Bay of Ieranto (or 'Jeranto') at the western end of the Gulf of Salerno, Maiorca attempted to establish a new world record for freediving, aiming for 90 metres. The event was televised live, for the first time in the history of RAI (the Italian national broadcaster). Less than 20 metres into his dive, Maiorca bumped into Enzo Bottesini, an expert scuba instructor, and upon resurfacing he let out a string of strong expletives, many of which were clearly audible to the television audience. His outburst led to a television ban for many years, and led to his retirement from competition for more than a decade.

In 1988, Maiorca returned to free diving and set his final record of 101 metres.

Maiorca's main rivals were the Brazilian Amerigo Santarelli (who retired from the sport in 1963), Teteke Williams, Robert Croft, and Jacques Mayol.

== Post-diving ==
From 1994 to 1996, Maiorca was elected to the Senate for the right-wing Alleanza Nazionale party. Maiorca also appeared on Lineablu, a RAI broadcast news series, from 2000 to 2002. The character Enzo Molinari, portrayed by Jean Reno, in the 1988 Luc Besson film The Big Blue is based on Maiorca.

== Prizes ==
=== Variable buoyancy ===
- 1960 September depth 45 Metres
- 1960 November depth 49 Metres
- 1962 August depth 51 Metres
- 1964 August depth 53 Metres
- 1965 August depth 54 Metres
- 1966 November depth 62 Metres
- 1967 September depth 64 Metres
- 1968 August depth 69 Metres
- 1969 August depth 72 Metres
- 1970 August depth 74 Metres
- 1971 August depth 77 Metres
- 1972 August depth 78 Metres
- 1973 August depth 80 Metres
- 1974 September depth 87 Metres
- 1986 depth 91 Metres
- 1987 depth 94 Metres
- 1988 depth 101 Metres

=== Constant weight ===
- August 1961 50 Metres
- August 1972 57 Metres
- August 1973 58 Metres
- September 1976 60 Metres
- 1978 52 Metres (new regulation)
- 1979 55 Metres

== Awards ==
- Gold Medal of the President of the Republic (1964) for athletic prowess
- Ustica Golden Trident
- CONI's Literary Award for his book Headlong into the Blue (1976)
- Sport merits Gold Star from CONI
- Gold Medal of Merit Marina (not only for sports but also for the defence of the environment, 2006)
- His 80th birthday was celebrated in La Spezia with the conferring of the Award of the Maritime Festival.

== Bibliography ==
Maiorca was the author of several books:

- Headlong into the Blue: The Life and Business of a World Record. Milan, ed. Murcia, 1977.
- School Apnea. Rome, ed. Cuba, 1982.
- The Sea with a Capital S. Lights, 2001.
- Under the Sign of Tanit. Milan, Murcia, 2011 ISBN 9788842548799

== Film and music ==
- Maiorca co-starred as himself in the film Challenge on the Bottom (1975), directed by Melchiade Coletti.
- The rivalry between Maiorca and Jacques Mayol inspired the 1988 film The Big Blue by Luc Besson. The movie was not shown in Italy until 2002 due to Maiorca's objections. Recognizing his own caricature in the character of Enzo Molinari, Maiorca considered the portrayal detrimental to his image. After the death of Jacques Mayol in 2001 and Maiorca's retirement from competitions, he relented, and the film was shown.
- Maiorca is quoted by the protagonist of the film I Am Self Sufficient (1976) by Nanni Moretti.
- Maiorca is mentioned in the song "The Ballad of Cimino" by Davide Van de Sfroos.
- Maiorca is cited by the plaintiff Guido Nickel in the film Monte Carlo Grand Casino.

== See also ==
- Legends of Italian sport - Walk of Fame
- The Big Blue
