= Patrice Ledoux =

French film producer

- Born: France
- Occupation: Film producer

Patrice Ledoux is a French film producer.

== Filmography ==
- The Big Blue (1988)
- Nikita (1990)
- Atlantis (1991)
- 1, 2, 3, Sun (1993)
- Léon (1994)
- The Fifth Element (1997)
- The Messenger: The Story of Joan of Arc (1999)
- Just Visiting (2001)
- J'ai faim !!! (2001)
- Camping 2 (2010)
- The Sense of Wonder (2015)
