= Jacques Mayol =

French free diver (1927–2001)

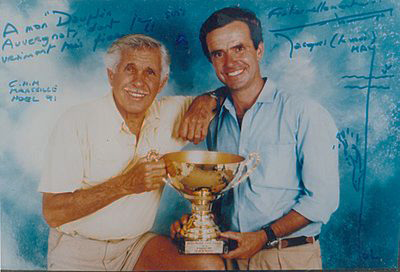
- Mayol (left) in 1989.

Personal information
- Nationality: French
- Born: 1 April 1927 Shanghai, China
- Died: 22 December 2001 (aged 74) Capoliveri, Italy

Sport
- Sport: Freediving

Jacques Mayol (1 April 1927 – 22 December 2001) was a French diver and the holder of many world records in free diving. The 1988 film The Big Blue, directed by Luc Besson, was inspired by his life story and that of his friend, Enzo Maiorca. Mayol was one of the screenwriters and authored the book Homo Delphinus: the Dolphin Within Man of his philosophy about the aquatic origins of humans.

== Early life ==
Jacques Mayol was a French national born in Shanghai, China. Mayol spent his summer holidays in Karatsu (Japan) every year as a child. When he was 7, he would skin dive with his older brother in seas around Nanatsugama in the Genkai Quasi-National Park (near Karatsu, Japan), where he saw a dolphin for the first time. Mayol described the fateful encounter in his book, "Homo Delphinus: The Dolphin Within Man".

== Career ==
On 23 November 1976, at 49, he became the first free diver to descend to 100 metres (330 ft), and when he was 56 he managed to descend to 105 metres (344 ft). During the scientific research phase of his career, Mayol tried to answer the question of whether man had a hidden aquatic potential that could be evoked by rigorous physiological and psychological training.

Mayol's lifelong passion for diving was based on his love for the ocean, his personal philosophy, and his desire to explore his own limits. During his lifetime, he helped introduce the then-elitist sport of free-diving into the mainstream. His diving philosophy was to reach a state of mind based on relaxation and yoga breathing, with which he could accomplish apnea. He also contributed to technological advances in the field of free-diving, particularly improving assemblies used by no-limits divers. He was also instrumental in the development of scuba diving's octopus regulator, which was invented by Dave Woodward at UNEXSO in 1965 or 1966. Woodward believed that having safety divers carry two second stages would be a safer and more practical approach than buddy breathing in the event of an emergency.

Mayol was already an experienced free diver when he met the Sicilian Enzo Maiorca, who was the first person to dive below 50 metres (160 ft). Mayol reached 60 metres (200 ft) depth. A friendship, as well as rivalry, between the two men ensued. Their most famous records were set in the no-limits category, in which divers are permitted to use weighted sleds to descend and air balloons for a speedy ascent. Between 1966 and 1983, Mayol was the no-limits world champion eight times. In 1981 he set a world record of 61 metres (200 ft) in the constant weight discipline, using fins. In 1976, Mayol broke the 100 metres (330 ft) barrier with a no-limits 101 metres (331 ft) dive off Elba, Italy. Tests showed that during this dive his heart beat decreased from 60 to 27 beats/min, an aspect of the mammalian diving reflex, a reflex more evident in whales, seals, and dolphins. Mayol's last deep dive followed in 1983 when he reached the depth of 105 metres (344 ft), at the age of 56.

== Dolphins ==
Mayol's fascination with dolphins started in 1955 when he was working as a commercial diver at an aquarium in Miami, Florida. There he met a female dolphin called Clown and formed a close bond with her. Imitating Clown, he learned how to hold his breath longer and how to behave and integrate himself underwater. It is the dolphins that became the foundation of Mayol's life philosophy of "Homo Delphinus".

Throughout his book L'Homo Delphinus (2000 published in English as Homo Delphinus: The Dolphin within Man by Idelson Gnocchi Publishers Ltd.) Mayol expounds his theories about man's relationship with the sea, and explores the aquatic ape hypothesis of human origins. He felt man could reawaken his dormant mental and spiritual faculties and the physiological mechanisms from the depths of his psyche and genetic make-up to develop the potential of his aquatic origins, to become a Homo delphinus.

Jacques Mayol predicted that within a couple of generations, some people would be able to dive to 300 metres (980 ft) and hold their breath for up to ten minutes. Today the no-limits record stands at 253 m (Herbert Nitsch, June 2012). Serbian Branko Petrović holds the record for Static Apnea at 11 minutes and 54 seconds (October 2014). Croatian Vitomir Maričić holds the record for static apnea on pure oxygen at 29 min 3 sec (14 June 2025).

== Film ==
The film The Big Blue, directed by Luc Besson in 1988, was inspired by his life story and the life story of the Italian diver Enzo Maiorca and their friendship. Mayol was one of the screenwriters.

Mayol was the subject of the 2017 documentary film Dolphin Man (L'Homme dauphin, sur les traces de Jacques Mayol), directed by Lefteris Charitos.

== Death ==
On 22 December 2001 Mayol committed suicide by hanging himself at his villa in Elba, Italy, after struggling with depression. He was 74 years old. His ashes were spread over the Tuscany coast. Friends have erected a monument to him at 16 metres (52 ft) depth at the Gemini islands in the southeast of Elba near his home.
