= Éric Serra =

French film composer

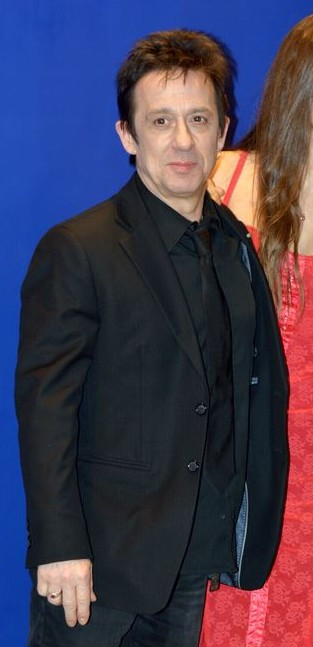
- Serra at the 2016 César Awards

Background information
- Born: 9 September 1959 (age 66); Saint-Mandé, France
- Origin: Paris, France
- Genres: Pop; dance; electronic
- Occupations: Film composer; songwriter
- Years active: 1970–present
- Label: RXRA
- Website: ericserra.com

Éric Serra (French: [eʁik sɛʁa]; born 9 September 1959) is a French film composer, known as a frequent collaborator of director Luc Besson. He is a five-time César Award nominee, winning once for The Big Blue (1988).

== Early life ==
Éric Serra was born on 9 September 1959 in Saint-Mandé. His father, Claude Serra, was a songwriter and poet during the 1950's and '60s, and so Éric was thus exposed to music and its production at a young age. His mother died when he was just seven years old.

== Career ==
In the early 1980s, Éric Serra met director Luc Besson and was asked to score his first film, Le Dernier Combat (1983). Serra has scored all of Besson's directed films to date, except Angel-A (2005) (scored by Anja Garbarek), and several that Besson has written, such as Wasabi (2001).

In 1995, Serra was chosen to compose the score to the James Bond film GoldenEye, and produced a much more modern-sounding avant-garde soundtrack than had been used in previous Bond films. It met with mixed reviews from film critics. While Serra's score has been seen by some as highly innovative, many Bond fans have criticized it and often highlighted the lack of the classic, instantly recognizable Bond leitmotif originally created by Monty Norman and John Barry. The GoldenEye producers later hired John Altman to re-score the tank chase sequence, which incorporated a traditional arrangement of the Bond theme. David Arnold would succeed Serra as Bond composer until 2008.

Serra is sometimes known as RXRA due to the French pronunciation of his name. His composition Little Light of Love on the soundtrack of the film The Fifth Element (1997) is credited to RXRA.

Serra has been the partner of Australian model Jodi Luschwitz for 17 years, with whom he has two children: Ashani and Mitivaï.

=== Other projects ===
From 1980 to 1988, Éric Serra played bass guitar for French singer Jacques Higelin.

Serra is also a songwriter, notably having written "It's Only Mystery" for the film Subway (1985), "My Lady Blue" for Le Grand Bleu (1988) and "Little Light of Love" for The Fifth Element (1997). In 1998 he released an album of rock music titled RXRA which resembles the artist's name when pronounced as initial letters in French.

Serra composed the music for the 2008 Las Vegas Criss Angel/Cirque Du Soleil show 'Criss Angel: Believe'.

=== Onscreen appearances ===
Serra has spent little time in front of the camera, choosing to work behind the scenes instead. However, on French television he has made a number of appearances performing music, and notably appeared in the Luc Besson film Subway in which he plays 'Enrico the bassist'.

== Film scores ==
Serra has composed the scores for the following films:

- L'Avant dernier (1981) (short film)
- Le Dernier Combat (1983)
- Subway (1985)
- La Nuit du flingueur (Episode 20 of Série noire) (1986)
- Kamikaze (1986)
- The Big Blue a.k.a. Le Grand Bleu (1988) (European version; a separate soundtrack composed by Bill Conti was created for the US version)
- Nikita a.k.a. La Femme Nikita (1990)
- Atlantis (1991)
- Léon: The Professional a.k.a. The Professional (1994)
- GoldenEye (1995)
- The Fifth Element (1997) (collaborating on its "Diva Dance" with opera singer Inva Mula)
- The Messenger: The Story of Joan of Arc (1999)
- L'Art (délicat) de la séduction (2001)
- Wasabi (2001)
- Décalage horaire (2002)
- Rollerball (2002)
- Bulletproof Monk (2003)
- Bandidas (2006)
- Arthur and the Invisibles (2006)
- Arthur and the Revenge of Maltazard (2009)
- The Extraordinary Adventures of Adèle Blanc-Sec (2010)
- Arthur and the War of the Two Worlds (2010)
- The Lady (2011)
- Lucy (2014)
- Renegades (2017)
- Anna (2019)
- Dogman (2023)
- The Wages of Fear (2024)
