= The Big Blue =

1988 film by Luc Besson

- Theatrical release poster
- French: Le Grand Bleu
- Directed by: Luc Besson
- Screenplay by: Luc Besson; Robert Garland; Marilyn Goldin; Jacques Mayol; Marc Perrier
- Story by: Luc Besson
- Produced by: Patrice Ledoux
- Starring: Jean-Marc Barr; Jean Reno; Rosanna Arquette; Paul Shenar; Sergio Castellitto; Marc Duret; Griffin Dunne
- Cinematography: Carlo Varini
- Edited by: Olivier Mauffroy
- Music by: Éric Serra (original); Bill Conti (US version)
- Production company: Gaumont
- Distributed by: Gaumont Distribution (France); Weintraub Entertainment Group; Columbia Pictures (United States); Filmauro (Italy)
- Release dates: 11 May 1988 (France); 19 August 1988 (United States)
- Running time: 132 minutes (original); 168 minutes (director's cut); 119 minutes (US version)
- Countries: France; Italy; United States
- Languages: French; Italian; English
- Budget: FRF 80 million (est. US$13.5 million)
- Box office: 9.2 million admissions (France); $4 million (worldwide)

The Big Blue (released in some countries under the French title Le Grand Bleu) is a 1988 drama film co-written and directed by Luc Besson. Inspired by the Cinéma du look movement, the film is a heavily fictionalized and dramatized story of the friendship and sporting rivalry between two leading contemporary champion free divers in the 20th century: Jacques Mayol (played by Jean-Marc Barr) and Enzo Maiorca (renamed "Enzo Molinari" and played by Jean Reno), and Mayol's fictionalized relationship with his girlfriend Johana Baker (played by Rosanna Arquette).

The Big Blue became one of France's most commercially successful films (although an adaptation for US release was a commercial failure in that country). French president Jacques Chirac referred to the film in describing Mayol, after his suicide by hanging in 2001, as an enduring symbol for the "Big Blue" generation.

The story was heavily adapted for cinema. In real life, Mayol lived from 1927 to 2001 and Maiorca retired from diving to politics in the 1980s. Both set no-limits-category deep diving records below 100 metres, and Mayol was indeed involved in scientific research into human aquatic potential, but neither reached 400 feet (120 metres) as portrayed in the film, and they were not direct competitors. Mayol himself was a screenwriter for the film, and Mayol's search for love, family, "wholeness" and the meaning of life and death, and the conflict and tension between his yearning for the deep and his relationship with his girlfriend are also major elements of the latter part of the film.

== Plot ==
Children Jacques Mayol and Enzo Molinari grow up in Amorgos, Greece in the 1960s. Enzo challenges Jacques to collect a coin on the sea floor but Jacques refuses. Jacques' father—who harvests shellfish from the seabed using a pump-supplied air hose and helmet—goes diving. His breathing apparatus and rope gets caught and punctured by rocks, and weighed down by water, he drowns in front of the children.

By the 1980s, both are well known for their freediving skills. In Sicily, Enzo rescues a trapped diver from a shipwreck. He is a world champion freediver and now wishes to find Jacques and persuade him to return to no-limits freediving to prove he is still the better of the two. Jacques works as a human research subject with dolphins and is participating in research into human physiology in the lakes of the Peruvian Andes, where his bodily responses to cold water immersion are being recorded. Insurance broker Johana Baker visits the station and is introduced to Jacques. After hearing that Jacques will be at the World Diving Championships in Taormina, Sicily, she fabricates an insurance problem that requires her presence there, to meet him again. The two start dating. However, neither of them realizes the extent of Jacques' allure for the deep. Jacques beats Enzo by 1 metre, and Enzo offers him a crystal dolphin as a gift, and a tape measure to show the small difference between their respective records. Johana goes back home to New York but is fired after her deception is discovered; she leaves New York and begins to live with Jacques. She hears the story that mermaids appear to the ones who truly love the sea and lead them to an enchanted place.

At the next World Diving Championships, Enzo beats Jacques' record. The depths at which the divers compete enter new territory, and the dive doctor suggests they should stop, to no avail. Jacques is asked to look at a dolphinarium where a new dolphin has been placed, and where the dolphins are no longer performing; surmising that the new dolphin is homesick, the three of them break in at night to liberate and return her to the sea. Back at the competition, other divers attempt to break Enzo's world record, but each fails. Jacques succeeds, reaching 400 feet (120 m). Angered by this, Enzo prepares to break Jacques' record. The doctor warns that the competitors must not go deeper, as the pressure becomes lethal at those depths. Enzo dismisses the doctor and attempts the dive anyway but is unable to return to the surface. Jacques dives to rescue him. Enzo, dying, tells Jacques that he was right and that it is better down there. He begs Jacques to help him back down to the depths, where he belongs. Distraught, Jacques refuses, and Enzo dies in his arms. To honor his dying wish, Jacques takes Enzo's body back down to a depth where the human body becomes negatively buoyant, and lets his friend sink into the depths. Jacques—himself suffering from cardiac arrest after the dive—is rescued by supervising scuba divers and requires his heart to be restarted with a defibrillator before being placed in medical quarters to recover.

Jacques appears to be recovering from the diving accident but later experiences a hallucinatory dream in which the ceiling collapses and the room fills with water, and he finds himself in the ocean depths with dolphins. After discovering she is pregnant, Johana returns to check up on Jacques but finds him lying unresponsive in his bed with bloody ears and a bloody nose. Johana attempts to help him, but Jacques gets up and walks to the diving boat and gets suited up for one final dive. Desperately, Johana begs Jacques not to go, saying she is alive but whatever has happened at the depths is not, but he says he has to. She announces she is pregnant and begs Jacques to stay. However, she eventually lets him go. The two embrace and Johana breaks down crying. Jacques then places the release cord for the dive ballast in her hand, and—still sobbing—she pulls it, sending him down to the depths. Jacques descends and floats for a moment, staring into the darkness. A dolphin then appears, and Jacques lets go of his harness, swimming away with it into the darkness.

=== Original and alternate (US) endings ===
The original ending (with Jacques swimming into the ocean's depths with a dolphin) was intentionally ambiguous; even though considering the depth Jacques has swum to, it appears highly unlikely that he could regain the surface alive. Yet it's implied in the film that Jacques' body has either mutated or evolved with the water tests run on him to the point where he can now live under the water.

In the American adaptation, the ending is expanded with an additional scene showing that after Jacques swims away with the dolphin, he returns to the surface where he and the dolphin play together for the night at sea.

== Cast ==
- Jean-Marc Barr as Jacques Mayol (based on real-life diver Jacques Mayol)
- Bruce Guerre-Berthelot as Young Jacques Mayol
- Jean Reno as Enzo Molinari (based on real-life diver Enzo Maiorca)
- Gregory Forstner as Young Enzo Molinari
- Rosanna Arquette as Johana Baker
- Paul Shenar as Dr. Laurence
- Sergio Castellitto as Novelli
- Jean Bouise as Uncle Louis
- Marc Duret as Roberto
- Griffin Dunne as Duffy
- Andreas Voutsinas as Priest
- Valentina Vargas as Bonita
- Kimberley Beck as Sally
- Patrick Fontana as Alfredo
- Alessandra Vazzoler as La Mamma, Enzo's Mother
- Geoffroy Carey as Supervisor
- Claude Besson as Jacques' Father
- Luc Besson as Blond Diver (Cameo)
- Paul Herman as Taxi Driver in New York

== Comparison with real life ==
The film was heavily fictionalized. In real life, Jacques Mayol and Enzo Maiorca were indeed champions and contemporaries. However, they did not directly compete, neither reached 400 feet, and neither died while diving.

Mayol was indeed involved in scientific research into human aquatic potential, and was fascinated by dolphins, and was recorded as having a heartbeat that slowed from 60 to 27 beats per minute when diving. He held numerous world records, including dives to below 100 metres. After a bout of depression, he killed himself in 2001, long after the film's release.

Maiorca (renamed as "Enzo Molinari" in the film) also set numerous depth records from 1960 to 1988, despite involuntarily retiring from the sport for over a decade between 1974 and 1986 after an outburst on TV cost him a competition ban. He entered politics in the 1990s, and became a member of the Italian Senate for a time. For many years, he resisted public showing of the film in Italy, as he considered it to caricature him poorly; after Mayol's death in 2001, he relented and accepted the showing of the film.

== Production ==
Besson was initially unsure of whom to cast in the main role of Mayol. He initially offered the role to Christopher Lambert and Mickey Rourke and even considered himself for the role until someone suggested Jean-Marc Barr. Besson has a cameo appearance as one of the divers in the film. The Big Blue was the most financially successful French film of the 1980s, selling 9,193,873 tickets in France alone, and played in French theaters for a year.

With its extensive underwater scenes and languid score (as with nearly all of Besson's films, the soundtrack was composed by Éric Serra), the film has been both praised as beautiful and serene, and in equal measure criticized as being too drawn out, overly reflective and introspective. While popular in Europe, the film was a commercial failure in North America. The American version was recut to include a simplified "happy" ending, and Serra's score was replaced with a soundtrack composed by Bill Conti. This version was only available on VHS and LaserDisc in the United States (both with 4×3 pan-and-scan transfers) and is currently out of print. The director later released a longer director's cut on DVD, featuring the original ending and an extended version of the Serra score.

Much of the film was shot on the Greek island of Amorgos, where Agia Anna and the monastery of Panagia Hozoviotissa can be seen. The film was dedicated to his daughter Juliette Besson, who required surgery after becoming ill during filming.

=== Filming locations ===
- Maisons-Laffitte (France), piscine municipale (opening scene in swimming pool)
- Chattanooga, Tennessee, United States
- Manganari, Ios, Cyclades, Greece 36°38′51″N 25°22′17″E
- Agia Anna, Amorgos, Cyclades, Greece
- Kalotaritissa bay, Amorgos, Cyclades, Greece
- Marineland (Antibes), Antibes, Alpes-Maritimes, France
- Peru
- St. Croix, U.S. Virgin Islands
- Taormina, Messina, Sicily, Italy
- Lac du Chardonnet, Tignes, Savoie, Rhône-Alpes, France (lake diving under the ice in Peru)
- Cádiz, Spain
- Deutsche Bank Building, New York City, United States
- Giens, Hyeres France

== Reception ==
The film was met with positive reviews in Europe, where it was described as "one of the most significant cult movies of the 1980s" by French Cinema historian Rémi Lanzoni, who described it as "ooz[ing] with a sensuous beauty unlike any other film at the time".

The film was slightly edited for US release to have a new, positive ending and the original score was also replaced.

The US release was met with above average reviews. The film aggregator, Rotten Tomatoes gave it 62%, based on 21 reviews. The website's critics consensus reads, "Though this movie features beautiful cinematography, it drags on, being way too overblown and melodramatic." Metacritic, which uses a weighted average, assigned the film a score of 35 out of 100, based on 5 critics, indicating "generally unfavorable reviews".

Kevin Thomas of the Los Angeles Times, praised its cinematography, but warned viewers to "be prepared to want to come up for air only minutes into [the film]", referring to the film's pointless plot.

The film sold only 97,817 tickets in its opening week in and around Paris but went on to become one of the most popular French films of all time in France with admissions of 9.2 million.

== Accolades ==
The Big Blue was nominated for several César Awards and won César Award for Best Music Written for a Film (Éric Serra) and Best Sound in 1989. The film also won France's National Academy of Cinema's Academy Award in 1989.

The film was screened out of competition at the 1988 Cannes Film Festival.

Andrzej Malinowski's film poster for The Big Blue received a César Award nomination in 1989 from the French Academy of Arts and Film Techniques.

== Home media ==
The film was released on DVD on 21 July 2009.

A Blu-ray version containing both the extended and theatrical versions was released on 14 September 2009, in the United Kingdom, but this contains French-dubbed versions of both cuts, rather than the original English language. This was later corrected and the second release contained a LPCM 2.0 English soundtrack and a DTS 2.0 French dub. The French Blu-ray release contains only the Director's Cut of the film but with a French DTS-MA 5.1 soundtrack and is supplemented with Besson's Atlantis documentary on Blu-ray as well.

== In popular culture ==
A poster for the film can be seen in the photo studio in the 1992 South Korean film The Moon Is... the Sun's Dream.

In 1993, the Israeli singer Sharon Lifshitz released the song "Ha'ish Me'hayam" (האיש מהים – The Man From The Sea) which was written by Suki Lahav and was based on the film.

In the 2009 Japanese anime series Eden of the East, Akira plays the film in his villa's cinema for Saki, who was a big fan. The title of the episode, "On the Night of the Late Show", is a reference to this scene.

== See also ==
- Cinema of France
- List of French-language films
- No-limits apnea – the type of freediving portrayed in the film
