= The Sense of Wonder =

2015 French romance film

- Theatrical release poster
- Le Goût des merveilles
- Directed by: Éric Besnard
- Written by: Éric Besnard
- Produced by: Patrice Ledoux; Michel Seydoux
- Starring: Virginie Efira; Benjamin Lavernhe
- Cinematography: Philippe Guilbert
- Edited by: Yann Dedet
- Music by: Christophe Julien
- Production companies: Camera One; Pulsar Productions
- Distributed by: UGC Distribution
- Release dates: 8 November 2015 (Cinemania); 16 December 2015 (France)
- Running time: 100 minutes
- Country: France
- Language: French
- Budget: $6.2 million
- Box office: $4.1 million

The Sense of Wonder (original title: Le Goût des merveilles) is a 2015 French romance film written and directed by Éric Besnard. It stars Virginie Efira and Benjamin Lavernhe.

== Plot ==
A widow with two young children discover a new lease of life after she hits a stranger with her car.

== Cast ==
- Virginie Efira as Louise Legrand
- Benjamin Lavernhe as Pierre
- Lucie Fagedet as Emma Legrand
- Léo Lorléac'h as Félix Legrand
- Hervé Pierre as Jules
- Hiam Abbass as Dr. Mélanie Ferenza
- Laurent Bateau as Paul
- François Bureloup as bar owner
