= Dogman (2023 film) =

French film by Luc Besson

- Theatrical release poster
- Directed by: Luc Besson
- Written by: Luc Besson
- Produced by: Virginie Besson-Silla
- Starring: Caleb Landry Jones; Jojo T. Gibbs; Christopher Denham
- Cinematography: Colin Wandersman
- Edited by: Julien Rey
- Music by: Éric Serra
- Production companies: EuropaCorp; Luc Besson Production; TF1 Films Production
- Distributed by: Apollo Films; EuropaCorp Distribution
- Release dates: 31 August 2023 (Venice); 27 September 2023 (France)
- Running time: 114 minutes
- Country: France
- Language: English
- Box office: $4.2 million

Dogman is a 2023 English-language French action thriller film written and directed by Luc Besson and starring Caleb Landry Jones, Jojo T. Gibbs, Christopher Denham, John Charles Aguilar, and Grace Palma. Set in New Jersey, it depicts a man who was abused by his father and loves dogs.

Dogman was selected to compete for the Golden Lion at the 80th Venice International Film Festival, where it premiered on 31 August 2023. It was released in France on 27 September 2023. Critical reception was mixed among the press, but considerably more favorable among audiences.

== Plot ==
A truck driven by a paraplegic man disguised in drag and filled with dozens of dogs is stopped by police in New Jersey. The driver, Douglas “Doug” Munrow, is arrested. Psychiatrist Evelyn is called to interrogate him, and the film unfolds largely through Doug’s recounting of his life story in a series of flashbacks.

Doug grew up in a violently dysfunctional family. His father and brother, both abusive and fanatically religious, run illegal dog fights. Doug forms a deep bond with the dogs and secretly feeds them despite his father’s orders to starve them. When Doug admits he loves the dogs more than his own family, his father punishes him by locking him in the dogs’ outdoor kennel, where he lives in harsh conditions. After Doug attempts to stop his father from killing newborn puppies, his father shoots him, severing one of his fingers and leaving him permanently paralyzed. Doug sends a dog carrying the severed finger to the authorities, leading to his rescue. His father later dies by suicide in prison, while his brother was attacked by Doug's loyal dogs after his release.

Doug enters social care and later a juvenile institution, where he meets Salma, a theatre teacher who encourages him to read and introduces him to the works of William Shakespeare. Doug becomes deeply attached to her and memorizes many of Shakespeare’s plays. Years later, as an adult, he attends one of her performances and is devastated to discover that she is married and pregnant.

Living on the margins of society, Doug eventually runs a dog shelter but is forced out and moves with his animals into an abandoned high school. He also performs as a drag artist in a nightclub cabaret. To survive and to take revenge on the wealthy whose lives contrast sharply with his childhood poverty, Doug trains his dogs to carry out burglaries, sending them into the homes of rich people to steal jewelry and valuables. The dogs also protect vulnerable members of his neighborhood.

An insurance investigator eventually traces the string of thefts back to Doug and tries to blackmail him. The investigator is killed by Doug’s dogs, forcing Doug to abandon his criminal activities. Soon after, Doug confronts a local crime boss known as El Verdugo, threatening him to stop extorting protection money from someone Doug cares about. El Verdugo retaliates by attacking Doug’s hideout with armed men. Doug and his dogs defend themselves in a violent siege, killing the attackers, though Doug is seriously injured.

Fleeing with his dogs in a truck, Doug is eventually captured by police—the moment shown at the beginning of the film.

Back in the present, Doug finishes telling his story to Evelyn. He explains that he chose to confide in her because he recognized signs that she too had suffered abuse. Evelyn resolves to help him, but before anything can be done, Doug’s dogs arrive at the police station and create chaos, enabling him to escape.

Doug manages to walk outside despite his injuries, taking a few steps before collapsing. Surrounded by his loyal dogs, he dies. In the aftermath, one of the dogs later sits outside Evelyn’s home, seemingly watching over her and her child.

== Cast ==
- Caleb Landry Jones as Douglas "Doug" Munrow
  - Lincoln Powell as teenage Douglas
- Jojo T. Gibbs as Evelyn
- Christopher Denham as Ackerman
- Clemens Schick as Mike Munrow
- John Charles Aguilar as El Verdugo
- Grace Palma as Salma Bailey
- Iris Bry as Douglas' mother
- Marisa Berenson as the aristocrat woman
- Emeric Bernard-Jones as Cher
- Alexander Settineri as Richie Munrow
- Michael Garza as Juan
- Tom Leeb as Bradley
- Kyran Thrax as Drag Madonna

== Production ==
Dogman was filmed in a virtual production facility in Essonne, France, from February to July 2022, and on location in Newark, New Jersey, in June 2022.

== Release ==
Dogman was selected to compete for the Golden Lion at the 80th Venice International Film Festival, where it had its world premiere on 31 August 2023. It was released in French cinemas on 27 September 2023 by Apollo Films Distribution and EuropaCorp Distribution. Originally scheduled for 19 April 2023, the release was pushed back in hopes to secure a premiere at an autumn film festival after positive reception from buyers at the European Film Market in February 2023. It was also invited at the 28th Busan International Film Festival in the Open Cinema section and was screened on 6 October 2023. The film was released in select theaters in the United States on 15 March 2024 by Briarcliff Entertainment, before expanding to a wide release on 22 March.

== Reception ==
=== Critical response ===
On the review aggregator website Rotten Tomatoes, the film holds an approval rating of 59% based on 71 reviews, in clear disagreement with the average viewer rating of 84%. The website's critics consensus reads, "While Besson, Landry Jones, and a pack of mutts lend DogMan their roaring souls, this entry offers ample creative risks and kibbled returns." Metacritic, which uses a weighted average, assigned the film a score of 45 out of 100 from 23 critics, indicating "mixed or average" reviews. Audience feedback is also more positive, with an average score of 67 out of 100 on Metacritic.

Catherine Bray, in her review for The Guardian, called Dogman "the most ludicrous film you'll see all year, maybe ever". Peter Bradshaw of The Guardian awarded the movie three stars out of five, describing it as odd, but well-executed and amusing. French film critics of Radio France criticized the accumulation of clichés and the lack of cohesion of the plot. Jean-Luc Wachthausen of Le Point, however, found the film "disturbing and keeping its promises".

=== Awards and nominations ===
Awards and nominations for Dogman
Award	Date of ceremony	Category	Recipient(s)	Result	Ref.
Venice Film Festival	9 September 2023	Golden Lion	Luc Besson	Nominated	
Venice Film Festival	9 September 2023	Queer Lion	Luc Besson	Nominated	
Venice Film Festival	9 September 2023	Fanheart3 Award – Graffetta d'Oro for Best Film	Luc Besson	Won	
