= Lucy (2014 film) =

2014 French science fiction action film

- Theatrical release poster
- Directed by: Luc Besson
- Written by: Luc Besson
- Produced by: Virginie Besson-Silla
- Starring: Scarlett Johansson; Morgan Freeman
- Cinematography: Thierry Arbogast
- Edited by: Julien Rey
- Music by: Éric Serra
- Production companies: EuropaCorp; TF1 Films Production; Canal+; Ciné+
- Distributed by: EuropaCorp Distribution (France); Universal Pictures (International) (Note: excludes China (China Film Group Corporation), Hong Kong (Golden Scene), and the Benelux (Belga Films and Independent Films))
- Release dates: 25 July 2014 (United States); 6 August 2014 (France)
- Running time: 90 minutes
- Country: France
- Languages: English; Taiwanese Mandarin; Korean; French
- Budget: $40 million
- Box office: $469 million

Lucy is a 2014 English-language French science fiction action film written and directed by Luc Besson for his company EuropaCorp, and produced by his wife, Virginie Besson-Silla. It was shot in Taipei, Paris, and New York City. It stars Scarlett Johansson, Morgan Freeman, Choi Min-sik, and Amr Waked. Johansson portrays Lucy, a woman who gains psychokinetic abilities when a nootropic, psychedelic drug is absorbed into her bloodstream.

The film was released on 25 July 2014 and became a massive box office success, grossing over $469 million worldwide, more than eleven times the budget of $40 million. It received generally positive, but also polarized, critical reviews. Although praise was given for its themes, visuals, and Johansson's performance, many critics found the plot nonsensical, especially its focus on the ten-percent-of-the-brain myth and resulting abilities.

== Plot ==
Lucy is an American studying in Taipei. Her new boyfriend Richard coerces her into delivering a briefcase containing four bags of the highly valuable synthetic drug CPH4 to Mr. Jang, a South Korean drug lord, at the Regent Taipei.

After witnessing Richard being shot dead, she is captured and forced to become a drug mule. One bag of the drug is sewn into her abdomen for transport to Europe. She is kicked in the belly, breaking the bag and releasing a large quantity of the drug into her system. She acquires enhanced physical and mental capabilities, such as telepathy, telekinesis, mental time travel, and negated emotions; she also ceases to feel pain. Using her new abilities, she kills her captors and escapes.

Lucy travels to the nearby Tri-Service General Hospital to get the bag of drugs removed. She is told by the operating doctor that natural CPH4 is produced in tiny quantities by pregnant women during their sixth week of pregnancy to provide fetuses with the energy to develop. As her abilities continue to develop, Lucy returns to Mr. Jang's hotel, kills his bodyguards, assaults him, and telepathically extracts the locations of the drug mules who are carrying the three other bags of CPH4.

Lucy contacts scientist Samuel Norman, whose research about the brain's capacity helps her understand her condition. Lucy demonstrates proof of her abilities to an amazed Norman and tells him she will die in 24 hours. When she asks what she should do with her newfound knowledge, Norman suggests she pass it on. Lucy agrees and flies to Paris to meet with him. She contacts local police captain Pierre Del Rio to help her find the other three drug mules. During the flight, she has a sip of champagne, which initiates a drug interaction that causes her cells to become unstable. To stave off this process, Lucy ingests more of the drug.

With the help of Del Rio, Lucy is able to recover the rest of the drugs. Meeting Norman and his colleagues, she agrees to share with them everything she knows. In the professor's lab, Lucy discusses the nature of time and life and how people's humanity distorts their perceptions. At her urging, she is intravenously injected with the contents of all three remaining bags of CPH4.

As Lucy's brain capacity begins to rapidly increase, her body changes into a black substance that begins spreading over computers and other electronic devices in the laboratory, combining with them and transforming into a single supercomputer. She mentally begins a journey through spacetime into the past, eventually reaching the oldest discovered ancestor of mankind, Lucy. She shares a quiet moment with Lucy and the two touch fingertips, before she goes all the way to the beginning of time and witnesses the Big Bang. Meanwhile, Jang enters the laboratory and points a gun at Lucy, whose body has reformed. He shoots at her head, but by that point Lucy has reached 100% of her brain capacity and promptly vanishes, moving into the space-time continuum. Only her clothes and the black supercomputer are left behind.

Del Rio enters and fatally shoots Jang. Norman takes a black flash drive offered by the supercomputer, after which it, too, disintegrates. Del Rio asks Norman where Lucy is, immediately after which Del Rio's cell phone sounds and he sees a text message: "I am everywhere." Lucy's voice is heard stating "Life was given to us a billion years ago. Now you know what to do with it."

== Cast ==
- Scarlett Johansson as Lucy Miller:
  The role of Lucy called for "an actress who could be believable as extremely vulnerable, as well as superpowered, when her exposure to an illicit substance inadvertently makes her acquire incredible skills." Impressed by Johansson's discipline, Besson considered her for the role, stating that she was immediately precise and professional, and he "enjoyed the way she talked about the film." He said, "She was excited for the right reason, which was the story. At that moment, it was a done deal for me. She was definitely the one." Angelina Jolie is widely reported to have been originally cast as Lucy, and as having dropped out of the role prior to filming. Although Jolie was in "serious talks" with Besson since 2011 to star in his next directorial effort, then untitled, he stated that she was not his first choice for the role of Lucy.
- Morgan Freeman as Professor Samuel Norman:
  A scientist and a professor at the University of Paris who has knowledge of different human capabilities. Producer Virginie Silla stated that given Freeman's experience portraying a character of wisdom, "it was pretty obvious that he was the perfect actor" for the role of Professor Norman.
- Choi Min-sik as Mr. Jang:
  A South Korean drug lord. Besson said that Mr. Jang is the "best villain" he scripted since Gary Oldman's character Norman Stansfield, adding that "Whereas Lucy is the ultimate intelligence, Mr. Jang is the ultimate devil." Besson and his film team "had to go and meet [Choi] in Korea, talk with him and discuss the story. And it was only at the very end that he said, 'Okay, I'm interested, I want to be in.'"
- Amr Waked as Pierre Del Rio:
  A French police officer. Besson stated that "Del Rio represents the audience; he's basically you and me," and added that when Lucy has "lost all her emotions by being exposed to the drug," there exists "a tiny spark of emotion that's still there" when she is with Del Rio. Waked also said that Besson having written the script was enough for him to want to star in the film.
- Julian Rhind-Tutt as the polite British antagonist who sews drug packs into the mules
- Pilou Asbæk as Richard, Lucy's delinquent boyfriend in Taipei
- Lio Tipton (Note: Credited as Analeigh Tipton) as Caroline, Lucy's roommate in Taipei
- Nicolas Phongpheth as Jii, Jang's top henchman

Speaking of Besson's "interest in making the film one about the way we interact with our environment, and socially as well," Silla said that one of the goals was to bring together a diverse cast to show the planet's diversity and a mixture of the different cultures. She stated, "So we have Scarlett Johansson, who is Caucasian, Morgan Freeman, who is African-American, Min-Sik Choi, who is from Korea, and Amr Waked, who hails from Egypt."

== Production ==
=== Writing ===
Besson stated that he intended for the first part of Lucy to be like Léon: The Professional (which he also wrote and directed), the second part to be like Inception and the third part to be like 2001: A Space Odyssey.

He was intrigued by the brain capacity of Lucy, a female Australopithecus afarensis, stating that her brain weight was only 400g, and modern human brains weigh in around 1.4 kg. "I was very interested with all the science," he said. "When I learned one cell can send 1000 messages per cell per second and we have 100 billion cells in our body, for me, it's gigantic." He did not want to make "a documentary about the brain," and so he focused on making an entertaining film with scientific and ethical aspects, which he cited as "quite rare today." He said, "That was my goal: an action film with a purpose. When I was younger, the purpose I had was smaller. Basically, this is about us, our legacy and what we learn."' An animated version of Australopithecus being in the film, "modeled on the dawn of Man sequence from 2001: A Space Odyssey", is one of several of Lucy's homages.

"I live in a country of food, and you can't have a third star in a restaurant (the top Michelin rating) without risk, invention or creativity", Besson said. "I'd rather take some risks, and maybe some people will say, 'What the fuck is this film?' But some others will embrace it. I totally understand that we can't take this kind of risk on every movie, but at the same time, you can't progress if there is not risk and novelty." He added, "I guess the film has the possibility to be a hit with the American audience. Of course, I would rather that it perform and the people are happy with it."

=== Budget and filming ===
With an estimated budget of 48 million euros, Lucy was the second-largest French film production in 2013, and the biggest ever for EuropaCorp, the company founded by Besson in 2000.

Principal photography started in September 2013 at the Cité du Cinéma, a then-new megastudio on the outskirts of Paris. On 5 September, scenes were shot at the cliffs of Étretat in northern France. Eleven days of filming began in Taipei, Taiwan, on 21 October; locations included Taipei 101, one of the world's tallest skyscrapers. Some footage was filmed with IMAX cameras.

On 23 October, The Hollywood Reporter said Besson had become enraged by all the media attention the shoot was getting that day. Meeting reporters in Taipei a day after he finished shooting the Taiwan part of the film, he said, "We don't want pictures with new dresses of Scarlett. Sometime [sic] I lost a bit of my concentration because I'm bothered by that," adding that paparazzi intrusions meant "shooting at night time was a nightmare". Besson said two unnamed agencies from Hong Kong were especially disruptive.

=== Visual effects ===
Lucy has the most visual effects in a film directed by Besson, with over 1,000 effects shots under senior visual effects supervisor Nicholas Brooks. Most visual effects were done by Industrial Light & Magic (ILM), with a team headed by supervisor Richard Bluff. Bluff described Lucy as "really fun because it wasn't a thousand shots of robots or things we typically do," instead relying on short sequences "that required a lot of new ways to problem-solve and to visualize them." ILM began work on the project in July 2013, based on concept art provided by Besson's Europacorp, such as Lucy disintegrating and sprouting black tendrils. Among the material ILM studied as reference for the effects were chemical reactions, laser lighting displays seen at raves, and the work of artist Perry Hall, who had worked with Brooks in What Dreams May Come. Rodeo FX handled the Paris chase scene, Taipei matte paintings, and the visual representation of cell phones' radio waves seen by Lucy's enhanced vision.

=== Music and soundtrack ===
Lucy: Soundtrack from the Motion Picture

Soundtrack album by Éric Serra, Various Artists
- Released: 22 July 2014
- Genres: Film soundtrack, film score
- Label: Back Lot Music

Éric Serra chronology
The Lady (2011)	Lucy: Soundtrack from the Motion Picture (2014)

The film's score was composed by Éric Serra, who has scored all of Besson's films except Angel-A and The Family. British musician Damon Albarn contributed the song "Sister Rust". The soundtrack was released on 22 July 2014 by Back Lot Music.

The Introitus of Mozart's Requiem features in the score at the moment of Lucy's awakening.

== Marketing ==
Distributor Universal Pictures issued several print and digital posters for Lucy. The theatrical release poster had this tagline: "The average person uses 10% of their brain capacity. Imagine what she could do with 100%." On 15 August 2014, Universal Pictures released two advance posters for the upcoming comedy film Dumb and Dumber To that spoofed the theatrical release poster for Lucy.

On 2 April 2014 the first trailer for Lucy was released. It was described as having "hit the Internet with the force of a punch to the head," with reviewers wrote that it promised "a wild ride with Johansson rendering people unconscious with a flick of her wrist"; "awesome" as "the girl who was once exploited becomes very, very dangerous"; and "wonderfully insane as Johansson goes from a drug mule at the mercy of her captors to a superhuman with remarkable control over her body and a diminishing capacity for mercy." James Luxford of The Guardian said the trailer fit a theme evident in Johansson's past three films: characters who "evolve, mutate or vanish altogether". After the film premiered, critics said the trailers portrayed the film as more action-packed than it actually was. A behind-the-scenes preview of the film was released on July 10.

In his 2014 book, Great Myths of the Brain, Christian Jarrett dismisses the film's portrayal of the potential for "mastering all knowledge and hurling cars with her mind" as being fully speculative fiction.

=== Home media ===
Universal Pictures Home Entertainment released Lucy on DVD and Blu-ray on January 20, 2015, on August 9, 2016, the 4K Ultra HD Blu-ray was released.

== Reception ==
=== Box office ===
Lucy grossed $126.7 million in North America and $336.7 million in other territories, for a worldwide total of $463.4 million, against a budget of $40 million.

On July 25, Lucy opened at 3,172 theaters in the United States. It opened with $17,088,110, placing it in the top spot for the box office opening weekend, ahead of the competing film Hercules, which debuted in the number two spot with $11,058,454. Lucy, described as "bringing a needed boost to the ailing summer box office," did financially better than expected, as early box office estimates for the film placed it "on track for $14 million to $15 million on Friday, including $2.7 million from 2,386 late Thursday screenings." It earned $43,899,340 at the domestic box office for the opening weekend, with Hercules remaining at second place with $29 million. Globally, Lucy debuted at the number one box office spot in all markets it was released in outside of U.S. and Canada, as of August 8. In Taipei, the film's performance has been credited to roughly half of the film having been shot there, and it having "boost[ed] Taiwan's popularity amid the country's efforts to bring itself to the world stage." It opened at twenty two Taipei theaters, grossing NT$14.3 million (US$478,000) from 57,900 admissions, and, after two days there, made NT$25.6 million (US$854,000) in the capital, later earning over NT$38 million (US$1.27 million) from seventy five locations nationwide, making it the fourth best opening day in Taiwan, after Transformers: Age of Extinction, Iron Man 3 and The Avengers, the best opening day for United International Pictures (UIP), and the best August opening day of all-time. Lucy is also the second most successful debut for a French action film.

The audience for Lucy was split evenly between men and women, with 65 percent being over age 25. Nikki Rocco, president for domestic distribution at Universal Studios, said, "To have a female lead in an original property absolutely made a difference. Scarlett is a star, and her presence [in the film] made it a lot more appealing for women." Michael Bodey of The Australian commented that women having comprised half the audience is "a seemingly new precedent for an action film" and that, because of its box office performance, Lucy is the film out of all of Besson's film work "likely to have the greatest cultural impact."

Thewire.com's David Sims stated that Johansson's success with Lucy at the box office would be "no mean feat given that it's a European R-rated action movie opening against a PG-13 epic with a more proven action star" in Dwayne Johnson (The Rock). "She's obviously had supporting roles in Marvel blockbusters but [Johansson] has never opened a blockbuster as an above-the-title star," he stated, adding that The Island was her first real attempt at doing so, but was a flop, and that if "tracking holds, Lucy will solidify this new phase in Johansson's career as a marquee name."

In U.S. and Canada, Lucy earned $61 million in ticket sales in 3,173 theaters, and attracted 7.6 million viewers in its opening week. Rocco said that widespread interest from ticket buyers indicated that Lucy brought "a different side to an action film," and that Universal Studios "had maintained high hopes for the 'R-rated original concept female-driven action movie.'" Leading in the weekend's ticket sales on online ticket service Fandango, Lucy outsold action thrillers Oblivion, Elysium and Edge of Tomorrow "at the same point in the sales cycle." It additionally outsold The Bourne Legacy ($38.1 million) and Salt ($36 million), compared to their opening weekend spots, but failed to surpass the opening weekend grosses for Wanted ($50.9 million) and Taken 2 ($49.5 million). Ray Subers of Box Office Mojo stated, "The fact that it even came close, though, is a fairly remarkable feat for this moderately-budgeted original action movie."

Subers said that there are a few contributing factors to Lucy's success, commenting, "First, the movie had an intriguing premise (what if we could use more than 10% of our brains?) that was front-and-center in action-packed, visually-stunning advertisements." He said that this helped Johansson's lead role of Lucy appear to be "a natural extension of the butt-kicking brand she's built" as Black Widow in The Avengers and Captain America: The Winter Soldier, and that "recognizing that audiences were connecting with the material, Universal made the savvy decision to move Lucy up from mid-August," where it instead would have been competing with Guardians of the Galaxy, Teenage Mutant Ninja Turtles, and The Expendables 3, a contrast to "this less-competitive late July date." Oliver Gettell of Los Angeles Times commented similarly, citing five reasons for the film's successful opening weekend: A catchy sci-fi hook (the ten percent of brain myth), Johansson as an action star, Besson as a crowd-pleaser (known for films that please audiences, especially ones that craft strong female characters), a summer of strong women (previous successful female-driven films in the year being Maleficent and The Fault in Our Stars), and a slick marketing campaign (the trailers for the film emphasizing a high concept narrative, action and mayhem while de-emphasizing "philosophical and metaphysical pontificating").

=== Critical response ===
Early reviews for the film were positive and mixed, and later generally positive. Lucy was categorized as entertaining and silly, but also polarizing, by critics. On review aggregator website Rotten Tomatoes, it holds an approval rating of 67% based on 234 reviews, with an average rating of 6.10/10. The site's critical consensus reads: "Enthusiastic and silly, Lucy powers through the movie's logic gaps with cheesy thrills plus Scarlett Johansson's charm – and mostly succeeds at it." On review aggregator Metacritic, the film has a weighted average score of 62 out of 100, based on 456 reviews, indicating "generally favorable reviews". Audiences polled by CinemaScore gave the film an average grade of "C+" on a A+ to F scale. Based on 14 press reviews, French website AlloCiné gave the film an average rating of 2.6 out of 5. The film received a score of 84% on French website Cinémur.

In France, the film received 14 press reviews. Regarding the positive reception, Danielle Attali wrote in Le Journal du dimanche that "Luc Besson's thriller shows a successful talent to entertain and keep in suspense". In Voici, the reviewer also appreciated the work of Besson, stating that he "returns to action films with this wacky cross between a superhero film and film about Asian gangsters, amped up by the always sexy Scarlett Johansson". In Le Parisien, Magali Gruet stated, "Some have called this a feminist film, and though we will not go that far, it would be wrong to deny that a woman is portrayed as the source of solutions intended to save the world." Libération wrote, "Beyond the success or embellishment which adorns each new scene with a spectacular swagger of violence and improbable turns, there is a strong feeling that Luc Besson now makes films from a position beyond merely marketing considerations." Le Nouvel Observateur wrote, "It was unclear how such a contrived portrayal can delude audiences once the novelty becomes dissipated."

Among U.S. reviews, Christopher Orr of The Atlantic reviewed it through the list of 26 points, in an article published in The Atlantic under title "The Dumbest Movie Ever Made About Brain Capacity". Orr begins with describing it as "mind-bendingly miscalculated sci-fi vehicle for Scarlett Johansson" whom he sees as "moderately charismatic", and film's 89 minutes length as "mercifully brief", although saying that "quantity of inanity" squeezed into this screen time "beggars that of awful movies of substantially greater length". He ultimately explains his choice of review format through points by calling the film "so idiotic that the only way to properly convey its flaws is to enumerate them". Justin Chang of Variety called Lucy "a slickly engineered showcase for a kickass heroine whom we instinctively, unhesitatingly root for" and an enjoyable, "agreeably goofy, high-concept" speculative narrative devoid of self-importance because "it pays deft, knowing homage to any number of Hollywood sci-fi head-trip classics, embedding its ideas in a dense labyrinth of cinematic references that somehow end up feeling sly rather than shopworn." Jordan Hoffman of The Guardian called the film "mindless and mixed up, but propulsive and fun" and added that "Scarlett Johansson shines in this pseudo-intellectual action flick that represents Luc Besson's finest work" since the film The Fifth Element; he gave Lucy 3/5 stars, while IGN's Jim Vejvoda rated the film a 7.2 and said "this movie is all about Johansson, who's in almost every scene. She ably plays the title character as she transforms from average person to omnipotent entity" and "ultimately, more of Lucy works than doesn't. It's a fun movie even if its 'science' more than strains suspension of disbelief. It's a credit to Besson's style and Johansson's performance that Lucy isn't a train wreck." The San Francisco Chronicle's Mick LaSalle said, "You can scoff at Besson's philosophies and hypotheses, but to do that would miss what's in front of you. Lucy is an impeccably realized vision of Besson's view of things."

By contrast, John DeFore of The Hollywood Reporter stated that "plenty of films and novels have envisioned what would happen if we gained conscious control over our entire brain," but that "it's hard to recall one whose ideas were more laughable than this one." He stated that the audience may "roll with the film" as Lucy does things beyond human capability, but that the film does not justify "Lucy's increasingly godlike abilities, which soon include time travel and levitation. Every now and then, a nugget of real philosophy is dropped into the screenplay, but it's surrounded by so much blather that even a generous viewer has trouble using it to justify what Lucy experiences." Writing for LA Weekly, Amy Nicholson stated that Besson "must think the audience is operating with even fewer synapses [than the capacity of ten percent]. Here, his style is slick but hand-holdingly literal" and "as the newly bionic Lucy seeks vengeance, Besson even tries to convince us she's a strong female character, which to the majority of male action directors simply means a sexy, silent badass. The real females in the audience may wonder why a genius would limp across a multi-continental gunfight in five-inch Louboutins."

Among the main criticisms of the film were the ten percent of brain myth, Lucy becoming less empathetic and more robotic as her brain capacity increases, her invincibility, and the use of animal imagery to convey "obvious points". Ralph Blackburn of Belfast Telegraph called the notion of only using ten percent of the brain an "often-quoted idea" that "has obvious Hollywood potential," but, according to leading neuroscientists, is "nothing more than an urban myth." He cited neuropsychology professor Barbara Sahakian, quoting that "it's impossible to work out how much of our brain we are using quantitatively. However, it is definitely much more than 10 per cent." Chang stated that because Besson "seems more interested in engaging, playfully yet seriously, with the various biological, philosophical and metaphysical riddles that [the film] raises," the story is lacking as an action film and is not "much of a thriller – it's virtually an anti-thriller, devoid of suspense or any real sense of danger due to the fact that its heroine is more or less invincible," and that "at times it's hard to shake the sense that a smarter, more unbridled picture might have found a way to slip the bonds of genre altogether." Like Chang, DeFore felt that one of the flaws with the film is Lucy's invincibility because it "nullifies much of the drama to come." Michael Phillips of the Chicago Tribune said that the first twenty minutes of the film are good, but that by half an hour of runtime, the audience will realize that Lucy has no limits, which makes the film dull after a while with a "limited payoff". The Boston Globe's Ty Burr, on the other hand, stated of the criticisms: "who comes to a Besson movie seeking logic? Lucy stays true to its own invented physics." Besson said he knew of the ten percent myth, and that the film uses it as a metaphor, while Robbie Collin for The Daily Telegraph concluded the film is based on the Kantian model of transcendental idealism, where the human mind imposes order on the world to make sense of it, and without it all relations between objects in space and time would cease to exist.

Lucy has been compared to various films; common examples include Akira, 2001: A Space Odyssey, The Matrix, The Tree of Life, Transcendence, and especially Limitless. Chang said, "Lucy's gradual rise to omniscience and omnipotence recalls Neo's own such journey in The Matrix, while her many black-suited Korean opponents suggest another army of Agent Smiths," and added that, when Lucy "uploads herself, Big Brother-style, to every computer and TV screen in the vicinity," the film suggests "a livelier, less ponderous remake" of Transcendence. Hoffman said, "The end of the movie goes completely off the rails, but in a way that is charming in its stupidity. It's like 2001: A Space Odyssey for those with short attention spans, and those people need to have their minds blown, too, I suppose." Matt Prigge of Metro New York, while calling the film "stupid, smart and awesome," stated that it "smartly goes in a wildly different direction than the amusingly amoral Limitless, in which Bradley Cooper's character abused a similar drug, but used it to gain success, money and power. He was selfish. Lucy is selfless." Prigge added, "If Lucy is Limitless, it's Limitless with more than a dash of The Tree of Life, and even a bit" of the film Under the Skin, which also stars Johansson. Burr commented that "where a fully juiced cerebellum just made Cooper's character really, really capable, Lucy undergoes a metaphysical makeover that, by the film's midpoint, has started to rearrange time, space, and her body." Comparing Lucy's powers to characters Professor X, The Doctor, Dr. Manhattan, Galactus, God from Bruce Almighty, Scarlet Witch, and Tetsuo from Akira (manga), Hollywood.com's Jordan Smith stated that "Lucy may be the most powerful film character ever created," but indicated that Tetsuo's powers might match hers.

=== Accolades ===
Awards and accolades for Lucy
Year	Award	Category	Recipients	Result
2014	Alliance of Women Film Journalists	Kick Ass Award for Best Female Action Star	Scarlett Johansson	Nominated
2014	Village Voice Film Poll	Best Actress	Scarlett Johansson	Runner-up
2015	Saturn Award	Best Action/Adventure Film	Lucy	Nominated
2015	Broadcast Film Critics Association Awards	Best Actress in an Action Movie	Scarlett Johansson	Nominated
2015	Jupiter Award	Best International Actress	Scarlett Johansson	Nominated
2015	MTV Movie Awards	Best Female Performance	Scarlett Johansson	Nominated
2015	National Society of Film Critics Awards	Best Actress	Scarlett Johansson	3rd place
2015	Visual Effects Society Awards	Outstanding Created Environment in a Photoreal/Live Action Feature Motion Picture	Richard Bluff, Stephen Bevins, Stephen DeLuca, Tiffany Yung	Nominated

== Graphic novel and future ==
Hollywood journalist Nikki Finke reported in a July 2014 post on her film industry blog that: "In August, a Lucy graphic novel will be released online with four chapters appearing every other day for one week." The first chapter of the semi-animated graphic novel was published on the international version of the movie's official website and features the same story material as seen in trailers with picture elements that move as scrolling takes place.

In an April 2014 WonderCon interview, Besson was asked about the possibility of a Lucy sequel and stated, "With Lucy, you'll see the end of the film. I don't know how we can make a sequel, but if the film is huge, then I will think about it." In August, while promoting the film in Taipei, where scenes were shot, Besson commented further about the possibility of a sequel: "I don't see how we can do one. It's not made for that. If I find something good enough, maybe I will, but for now I don't even think about it." In June 2015, it was reported that a sequel was in development. In October 2017, it was rumored that Besson had completed the script, but on 5 October he announced on his Facebook page that he was not working on a sequel for Lucy.

On October 31, 2022, a spin-off series was announced to be in development by EuropaCorp and Village Roadshow, with Freeman in talks to reprise his role.

== See also ==
- Posthuman
- Charly, a 1968 film based on the 1959 short story and novel Flowers for Algernon, about a man whose IQ gets tripled.
- "Understand", a 1991 novelette by Ted Chiang about a man who's made super-intelligent by an experimental drug.
- Phenomenon, a 1996 film in which John Travolta is mysteriously turned into a genius with telekinetic powers.
- Elfen Lied, a 2002 manga series and 2004 anime series in which a mutant species of humans, The Diclonii, have telekinetic powers. This series also happens to have a protagonist named Lucy.
- Limitless, a 2011 film and 2015 television series in which a drug allows a man to realize his potential.
