= Subway (film) =

- French theatrical release poster
- Directed by: Luc Besson
- Written by: Luc Besson; Marc Perrier
- Produced by: Luc Besson; François Ruggieri
- Starring: Isabelle Adjani; Christopher Lambert; Richard Bohringer; Jean-Pierre Bacri; Jean-Hugues Anglade; Jean Reno; Michel Galabru; Jean Bouise
- Cinematography: Carlo Varini
- Edited by: Sophie Schmit
- Music by: Éric Serra
- Production companies: Les Films du Loup; TSF Productions; Gaumont; TF1 Films Production
- Distributed by: Gaumont Distribution
- Release date: 10 April 1985 (France)
- Running time: 104 minutes
- Country: France
- Language: French
- Budget: $2.6 million
- Box office: $50 million(Worldwide)

Subway is a 1985 French thriller film directed by Luc Besson and starring Isabelle Adjani and Christopher Lambert. The film is classified as part of the cinéma du look movement.

== Plot ==
Before the start of the film Héléna, the wife of a wealthy man, had invited Fred, who she had just met, to her birthday party on a whim. Fred, who carries dynamite sticks on him, had blown open a safe in the house and stole some papers. Dressed in a tuxedo from the party, he flees in Héléna's car from her husband's associates, also dressed in tuxedos. When Fred crashes his car into the entrance of a Paris Métro station, the chase continues on foot and inside a metro train, where Fred manages to lose his pursuers. He then calls Héléna to arrange an exchange of the papers for money. During the exchange, Fred accepts a far smaller amount than arranged and he and Héléna seem to acknowledge that they have feelings for each other. Her husband's associates try to capture Fred, but he escapes by jumping under a train and then entering deeper into the labyrinthic backrooms of the metro, but not before informing Héléna that he has not returned all of the papers. He later calls her and tells her he loves her.

In the bowels of the metro Fred meets and befriends several persons: Jean-Louis, a small-time thief who always wears roller skates and lives in one of the backrooms, where he lets Fred spend the nights; Big Bill, a strongman who works on the tracks and twice helps Fred lose handcuffs; a flower seller who buys Fred's tuxedo; a bass player and a drummer who Fred asks to start a band together with a singer Fred knows. Jean-Louis also suggests robbing a pair of money couriers who use the metro station every week.

The next morning, Fred arranges to see Héléna alone in exchange for the documents. Since her husband's associate Jean does not let her meet Fred alone, Héléna requests the help of metro police commissioner Gesberg and his assistant Batman who have tried to catch Jean-Louis for several months. After noticing that the flower vendor wears Fred's tuxedo, Gesberg coerces the flower vendor to tell him that Jean-Louis is helping Fred. Héléna manages to find Jean-Louis by herself and he brings her to Fred. She draws a gun and requests the papers. Fred, who seems amused, tells her that he does not have them and gives her incorrect information which she follows. She later comes back but no longer threatens Fred. Instead they spend the night together in the empty metro station with Jean-Louis, the drummer, Big Bill and others, stealing food, playing music, dancing and smoking marijuana.

The next morning, her husband shows her a ransom note ostensibly by Fred for 50.000.000 Francs for the documents and takes her back to their home. He also asks Jean to "take care" of Fred. At a party later that evening at a magistrate's home, Héléna defiantly insults everyone and leaves. She comes back to Gesberg and requests him to bring in Fred before her husband's associates kill him. Batman meets Fred by accident but fails to arrest him. Gesberg manages to take in Jean-Louis and finds out it was he who wrote the ransom note.

Fred and the flower vendor successfully rob the money couriers and Fred uses the money to arrange a concert in the metro station with the band that Fred had organized. The concert is a success. During the concert, Héléna sees Fred and happily runs toward him. At the same moment, Jean also sees Fred and shoots him. Fred collapses to the floor and a devastated Héléna kisses him when he asks her whether she loves him a little bit. She angrily and violently rebukes Jean when he tries to take her back to her husband, while Fred is seen still lying on the floor but happily singing along with the band.

== Cast ==
- Isabelle Adjani as Héléna Kerman
- Christopher Lambert as Fred
- Richard Bohringer as The Florist
- Michel Galabru as Commissioner Gesberg
- Jean-Hugues Anglade as The Roller
- Jean Bouise as The Station Master
- Jean-Pierre Bacri as Inspector Batman
- Jean-Claude Lecas as Robin
- Pierre-Ange Le Pogam as Jean
- Jean Reno as The Drummer
- Éric Serra as Enrico (bassist)
- Arthur Simms as Paul (singer)
- Isabelle Sadoyan as The prefect's wife

== Production ==
Subway was filmed partially on location in the Paris Métro and Paris RER, and partially on sets that were designed by Alexandre Trauner. The opening car chase scene is said to pay homage to the 1971 film The French Connection, and the film's ending is based loosely on the ending of the 1960 film Breathless.

=== Soundtrack ===
Éric Serra's score and other musical pieces from the soundtrack, such as Fred's band's song, "It's Only Mystery" (also written by Serra), were released on vinyl and cassette in 1985. The soundtrack sold over 100,000 copies in France. The soundtrack was released on CD in 1996.

== Reception ==
Subway was the third-most popular French film in France in 1986, after Trois Hommes et un Couffin and Les Specialistes. It attracted 2,920,588 cinemagoers. The film grossed $50 million at the box office in the world.

The film holds an 67% rating on Rotten Tomatoes, based on nine reviews. Metacritic, which uses a weighted average, assigned the film a score of 53 out of 100, based on 12 critics, indicating "mixed or average" reviews. Janet Maslin of The New York Times praised the film's "highly energetic visual style" and "the sheer fun of staging domestic scenes, musical interludes and roller-skate chases in the underground" but added that "[the] characters and situations [are] so thin that they might as well be afterthoughts".

According to film reviewer John Cribbs, "[Much] of Subway is meditative but largely plotless, like a dream being described to you by someone who's still trying to figure out the symbolism of it [themself] ... The film and its characters are actually anti-movement: it opens with three philosophical quotes about existence: Socrates, "To be is to do," Sartre, "To do is to be," and Sinatra, "Do be do be do." The message is clear: [director] Besson thinks it's a crazy world up there on the surface what with folks insisting on constantly "doing" things. To him the subway is someplace no square bozo would ever think about not moving swiftly through without a thought, therefore it's the ideal environment for outsiders who seek an eden of in-action; a stasis salvation .. The theme ... in Subway ... is about freedom from social responsibility."

== Accolades ==
Subway was nominated for the Foreign Language Film award at the 39th British Academy Film Awards. The film was nominated for 13 César Awards in 1986, winning 3: Best Actor (Christopher Lambert), Best Production Design (Alexander Trauner) and Best Sound.

== Home media ==
The film was released on DVD in the United States in November 2001. The DVD presents the film in 2.35:1 anamorphic widescreen and contains both an English-dubbed version as well as the original French version with English subtitles. Aaron Beierle of DVD Talk gave the DVD 3 out of 5 stars for video quality, and 2½ stars for audio quality. Jason Bovberg of DVD Talk gave the film 3 stars for both video and audio quality. Both reviewers gave the film only a ½ star for its extra features, noting only cast and crew biographies plus trailers for three of Besson's other films were included on the disc. As well as having no special features, standard versions of the DVD only contain the English-dubbed version; this has significant dialogue differences from the French original, though both Lambert and Adjani performed their own English.

Both the UK and French versions of the Blu-ray were released in September 2009. Both only contained the film in its original French audio, though with optional English subtitles. Blu-ray.com awarded both 3½ out of 5 stars for both audio and video quality.

== Bibliography ==
- Austin, Guy (2008). Contemporary French Cinema: An Introduction (2nd ed.). Manchester University Press. ISBN 9780719078293.
- Hayward, Susan; Powrie, Phil (2009). The Films of Luc Besson: Master of Spectacle. Manchester University Press. ISBN 9780719070297.
- Spicer, Andrew (2010). Historical Dictionary of Film Noir. Scarecrow Press. ISBN 9780810873780.
