= 1977 Deauville American Film Festival =

- Festival poster
- Location: Deauville, France
- Hosted by: Deauville American Film Festival Group
- No. of films: 40 feature films
- Festival date: September 5, 1977–September 11, 1977
- Language: International
- Website: www.festival-deauville.com

The 3rd Deauville American Film Festival took place at Deauville, France from September 5 to 11, 1977. The festival was non-competitive in nature and remained so until 1995. This year, festival also paid tributes to Gregory Peck, Vincente Minnelli and Sydney Pollack. Elizabeth Taylor's name was also announced for the tribute but she was unable to come to the festival that year. The festival screened 40 feature films.

== Programme ==
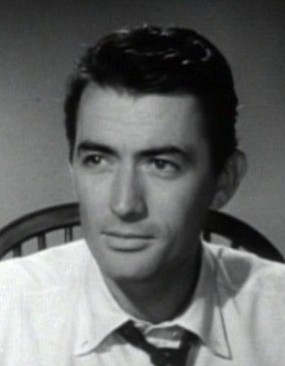
Festival paid tribute to Gregory Peck.

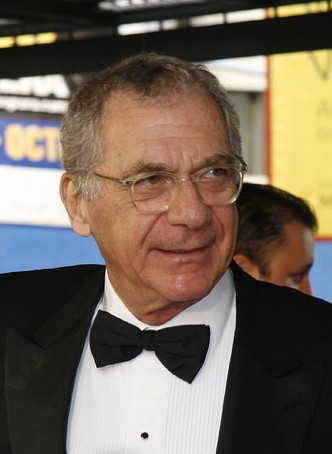
Festival paid tribute to Sydney Pollack.

=== America ===
- America at the Movies by James R. Silke
- Handle with Care by Jonathan Demme
- Black Sister's Revenge by Jamaa Fanaka
- Harlan County, USA by Barbara Kopple
- Hollywood Parade by Edward Shaw
- In MacArthur Park by Bruce R. Shwartz
- Life Goes to the Movies by Mel Stuart
- Meanwhile, Back at the Ranch... by Richard Patterson
- Rush It by Gary Youngman
- Skateboard by Georges Cage
- The Baby Maker by James Bridges
- The Blank Generation by Amos Poe and Ivan Král
- Unmade Beds by Amos Poe

=== American cinema overview ===
- Andy Warhol's Bad by Jed Johnson
- Dogs by Burt Brinckerhoff
- Eraserhead by David Lynch
- Goodbye, Franklin High by Mike MacFarland
- Kingdom of the Spiders by John "Bud" Cardos
- Two Tons of Turquoise to Taos Tonight by Robert Downey Sr.
- Rolling Thunder by John Flynn
- Ruby by Curtis Harrington
- Sybil by Daniel Petrie
- The Car by Elliot Silverstein
- The Mouse and His Child by Charles Swenson and Fred Wolf
- The Savage Bees by Bruce Geller
- Through the Looking Glass by Jonas Middleton

=== Preview ===
- A Little Night Music by Harold Prince
- Annie Hall by Woody Allen
- Bobby Deerfield by Sydney Pollack
- Islands in the Stream by Franklin J. Schaffner
- Nasty Habits by Michael Lindsay Hogg
- Nickelodeon by Peter Bogdanovich
- Ransom by Richard Compton
- Shenanigans by Joseph Jacoby
- Star Wars by George Lucas
- The Kentucky Fried Movie by John Landis
- The Great Smokey Roadblock by John Leone
- The Late Show by Robert Benton
- The Next Man by Richard C. Sarafian
- W. C. Fields and Me by Arthur Hiller

== Awards ==
- Tributes:
  - Gregory Peck
  - Vincente Minnelli
  - Sydney Pollack
- Lucien Barrière Prize for Literature:
  - Marc Ullmann
