= Atlantis (1991 film) =

- French theatrical poster
- Directed by: Luc Besson
- Written by: Luc Besson
- Produced by: Luc Besson
- Cinematography: Luc Besson; Christian Pétron
- Edited by: Luc Besson
- Music by: Éric Serra
- Production companies: Gaumont; Les Films du Loup; Cecchi Gori Group Tiger Cinematografica
- Distributed by: Gaumont (France); Penta Distribuzione (Italy)
- Release dates: 21 August 1991 (France); September 1991 (Italy)
- Running time: 78 minutes
- Countries: France; Italy

Atlantis is a 1991 documentary film about oceans, written, produced, edited, shot and directed by Luc Besson, and filmed over a two-year period.

== Plot ==
Except for the last shot of the film, the entire documentary takes place underwater with only titles and music by Éric Serra existing beyond the imagery.

== Parts ==
The film is divided into small parts:

=== Premier jour (first day) ===
- La lumiére (light)
- L'esprit (spirit)
- Le mouvement (movement)
- Le jeu (play)
- La grâce (grace)
- La nuit (night)
- La foi (faith)
- La tendresse (tenderness)
- L'amour (love)
- La haine (hate)

=== Dernier jour (last day) ===
- La naissance (birth)
