= Luc Besson =

French filmmaker (born 1959)

- Besson in 2026
- Born: Luc Paul Maurice Besson; 18 March 1959 (age 67); Paris, France
- Occupations: Director; producer; screenwriter
- Years active: 1981–present
- Spouses: Anne Parillaud (m. 1986; div. 1991) Maïwenn Le Besco (m. 1992; div. 1997) Milla Jovovich (m. 1997; div. 1999) Virginie Silla (m. 2004)
- Children: 5, including Shanna and Thalia

Luc Paul Maurice Besson (Note: French: [lyk bɛsɔ̃]) (born 18 March 1959) is a French filmmaker. He has been involved in the creation of more than 50 films as a writer, director, or producer. Associated with the Cinéma du look film movement, he founded the production company Les Films du Loup (later renamed Les Films du Dauphin) and co-founded EuropaCorp with Pierre-Ange Le Pogam.

Besson's films include Subway (1985), The Big Blue (1988), La Femme Nikita (1990), Léon: The Professional (1994), The Fifth Element (1997), The Messenger: The Story of Joan of Arc (1999), Lucy (2014), Valerian and the City of a Thousand Planets (2017), Dogman (2023), and Dracula (2025).

Besson has won three Lumière Awards: Best Director and Best Film for Joan of Arc, and Best Director for The Fifth Element. He also won the César Award for Best Director for The Fifth Element.

== Early life ==
Luc Paul Maurice Besson was born in Paris, France, to parents who worked as Club Med scuba-diving instructors. Influenced by their work, he planned to become a marine biologist. He spent much of his youth travelling with his parents to tourist resorts in Bulgaria, Greece, Italy, and Yugoslavia. The family returned to France when he was 10. His parents divorced and both remarried. At age 17, Besson had a diving accident that left him unable to dive. Pondering his career options, he realized that he loved writing and images. After visiting a film set, he decided he would become a filmmaker.

== Career ==
Besson reportedly worked on the first drafts of The Big Blue (1988) during his teens. Out of boredom, he started writing stories, including the background to what he later developed as The Fifth Element (1997), one of his most popular films, inspired by the French comic books he read as a teenager.

At 18, Besson returned to his birthplace of Paris, where he took odd jobs in film to get a feel for the industry. He worked as an assistant to directors including Claude Faraldo and Patrick Grandperret. He directed three short films, a commissioned documentary, and several commercials. He then moved to the United States for three years, but returned to Paris, where he formed his own production company. He first named it Les Films du Loup, then changed it to Les Films du Dauphin.

=== Cinéma du look ===
Film critics such as Raphaël Bassan and Guy Austin cite Besson as a pivotal figure in the Cinéma du look movement—a specific, highly visual style produced from the 1980s into the early 1990s. His early films Subway (1985), The Big Blue (1988) and La Femme Nikita (1990) are all considered of this stylistic school.

The term was coined by critic Raphaël Bassan in a 1989 essay in La Revue du Cinema n° 449. A partisan of the experimental cinema and friend of New Wave ("nouvelle vague") directors, Bassan grouped Besson with Jean-Jacques Beineix and Leos Carax as three directors who shared the style of "le look". These directors were later critically described as "favouring style over substance, and spectacle over narrative".

Besson, and most of the filmmakers so categorised, were uncomfortable with the label. In a 1985 interview with The New York Times, Besson contrasted the "Cinema du Look" with France's New Wave: "Jean-Luc Godard and François Truffaut were rebelling against existing cultural values and used cinema as a means of expression simply because it was the most avant-garde medium at the time" he added "Today, the revolution is occurring entirely within the industry and is led by people who want to change the look of movies by making them better, more convincing and pleasurable to watch." Also addressing the accusations of style over substance he remarked "Because it's becoming increasingly difficult to break into this field, we have developed a psychological armor and are ready to do anything in order to work," finally adding "I think our ardor alone is going to shake the pillars of the moviemaking establishment."

=== Popular success ===
Many of Besson's films have achieved popular, if not always critical, success. Reviews were mixed for The Big Blue. Kevin Thomas of the Los Angeles Times wrote that the movie was "too long and initially awkward but is clearly the work of a visionary." Le Grand Bleu (The Big Blue) has become a cult film in France over time.

"When the film had its premiere on opening night at the 1988 Cannes Film Festival, it was mercilessly drubbed, but no matter; it was a smash," observed the International Herald Tribune in a 2007 profile of Besson. "Embraced by young people who kept returning to see it again, the movie sold 10 million tickets and quickly became what the French call a 'film générationnel,' a defining moment in the culture."

Besson's La Femme Nikita (1990) is one of his earliest action films. Besson went on to write and produce numerous films in this genre, including the Taxi series (1998–2007), the Transporter series (2002–2008), and the Jet Li films Kiss of the Dragon and Unleashed. He also worked on Lockout (2012).

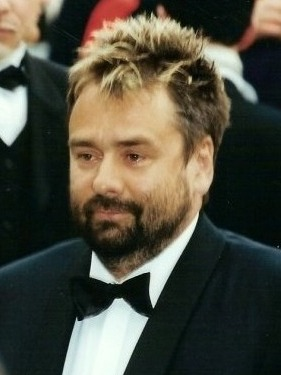
Besson at the 2000 Cannes Film Festival

After Besson's documentary film Atlantis (1991), he directed two critical and commercial successes: Léon: The Professional (1994) and The Fifth Element (1997) which would later become cult films. The Messenger: The Story of Joan of Arc (1999) was the last film Besson directed that was produced by the oldest production company in the world, Gaumont, which had been producing his films since Subway (1985). After The Messenger: The Story of Joan of Arc he created his own studio, EuropaCorp.

From 2002 to 2005 Besson created the hugely successful Arthur series of children's fantasy novels, which comprises Arthur and the Minimoys, Arthur and the Forbidden City, Arthur and the Vengeance of Maltazard, and Arthur and the War of the Two Worlds. He directed Arthur and the Invisibles (2006), a feature film adaptation of the first two books of the collection, starring Madonna and Robert DeNiro. Combining live action and animation, it was released in the UK and the US, as well as in France.

His English language films Taken, Taken 2, and Taken 3 have been major successes; Taken 2 became the largest-grossing export French film.

Besson also produced the promotional movie for the Paris 2012 Olympic bid.

=== Studio ambitions and difficulties ===
In 2000, Besson superseded his production company by co-founding EuropaCorp with Pierre-Ange Le Pogam, with whom he had frequently worked since 1985. Le Pogam had then been Distribution Director with Gaumont.

With EuropaCorp, Besson wanted to compete with the American major studios, but to maintain a stable of French directors and technicians producing in France, even if their films are most often in English with a foreign international star in the lead role. EuropaCorp went public in 2006 to finance, with the help of the State, its own studios at the Cité du Cinéma. It also sought financing and distribution partnerships in Japan and China.

By 2011, when he directed a biopic of Aung San Suu Kyi called The Lady (original title Dans la Lumiere), Besson was spending most of his time at EuropaCorp as a writer and producer, rather than a director: he had 44 writing credits and 103 producer credits, but only 17 directing credits. The film was a departure from Besson's favoured directorial genres, and from his preference to write the films he directs; the screenwriter was Rebecca Frayn. Western critics singled out Besson's direction for negative comments; Roger Ebert said: "Perhaps, given his strengths in genre films, he should have chosen not to direct this one…"

After several failures, Besson returned to creative form and to international success with Lucy (2014), which became the world's most successful French feature film, earning $469 million worldwide, superseding the previous record holder The Intouchables ($426 million).

The blockbuster Valerian and the City of a Thousand Planets (2017) had a budget of around $180 million, making it both the most expensive European and the most expensive independent film ever made, The project is very ambitious, with merchandise and even a board game planned ahead of its release. But by the summer of 2017, Chinese critics were snubbing it and the investment seemed impossible to make profitable.

Besson's failure was repeated with his next film, Anna (2019), placing his company in near bankruptcy and forcing him to sell it to a creditor and then close the free, no-degree-required school for screenwriters and directors that he had founded in 2012.

=== Recent work ===
Besson's film June & John (2025) was shot guerrilla-style in Los Angeles in 2020, during the COVID-19 pandemic. Building on a shelved pre-pandemic project Besson had been developing for a Chinese smartphone brand, the film was shot using only smartphones and a 12-person crew, and stars then-unknown actors Matilda Price and Luke Stanton Eddy.

He told Deadline: "It was very joyous. It was really two actors and a director because of the lockdown … It felt good to be uniquely creative without the pressure of money."

In 2022, Besson experimented with another kind of filmmaking when he shot Dogman (2023) in a virtual production facility in France, as well as on location in New Jersey.

Dogman was selected to compete for the Golden Lion at the 80th Venice International Film Festival, where it had its world premiere on 31 August 2023. It was released in French cinemas on 27 September 2023 by Apollo Films Distribution and EuropaCorp Distribution, and had mixed reviews: at Rotten Tomatoes, the film holds an approval rating of 59% based on 71 reviews, but on the other hand received very positive audience feedback with 84% positive reviews. while Metacritic, which uses a weighted average, assigned the film a score of 45 out of 100 from 23 critics, audience feedback on Metacritic is also more positive than press reviews, with an average score of 67 out of 100.

In summer 2024, Besson directed Dracula, an adaptation of Dracula starring Caleb Landry Jones and featuring Christoph Waltz. Dracula is the 2025 French film that achieved the highest global box office, with nearly 30 million dollars. It was released in cinemas in the United States in February 6, 2026. As with Dogman, Dracula had mixed press reviews, but was popular with the public, with an average of 53% from the press and 81% from viewers on Rotten Tomatoes. Dracula has met with notable success at the American box office, making $9 million in 10 days, a record for a French film since 2017.

In 2025 Luc Besson was announced as the director of The Last Man, a post-apocalyptic science fiction film starring rapper Snoop Dogg. He also wrote and produced the film Father Joe, starring Al Pacino, which premiered in September of 2026 at the Venice International Film Festival.

=== Regular collaborators ===
In the early 1980s, Besson met Éric Serra and asked him to compose the score for his first short film, L'Avant dernier. He subsequently had Serra compose for other films.

French actor Jean Reno has appeared in several films by Besson, including Le dernier combat (1983), Subway (1985), The Big Blue (1988), La Femme Nikita (1990), and Léon: The Professional (1994).

Besson directed and co-wrote the screenplay of his science fiction thriller The Fifth Element (1997) with American screenwriter Robert Mark Kamen.

He later collaborated with Kamen on the Transporter action series (2002–2008), and they co-wrote Taken (2008), Taken 2 (2012), and Taken 3 (2014), which all starred Liam Neeson.

In 2024, Besson mentioned his "fascination" with American actor Caleb Landry Jones after working with him on DogMan: "We got on so well on DogMan and since then I've only had one wish and that was to make another film with him. He's crazily talented. It's something I haven't seen since Gary Oldman." Luc Besson kept him in the lead role for his next film, Dracula.

=== Critical evaluation ===
Besson has been described as "the most Hollywood of French filmmakers". Scott Tobias wrote that his "slick, commercial" action movies were "so interchangeable—drugs, sleaze, chuckling supervillainy, and Hong Kong-style effects—that each new project probably starts with white-out on the title page."

American film critic Armond White has praised Besson, whom he ranks as one of the best film producers, for refining and revolutionizing action film. He wrote that Besson dramatizes the struggle of his characters "as a conscientious resistance to human degradation".

In 2012, film critic Eric Kohn wrote in Indiewire: "Luc Besson's filmography has been spotty for years, littered with equal amounts of sensationalistic pop art and flashy duds, a tendency that extends beyond his directing credits."

== Selected filmography ==
Directed features

- Le Dernier Combat (1983)
- Subway (1985)
- The Big Blue (1988)
- La Femme Nikita (1990)
- Atlantis (1991)
- Léon: The Professional (1994)
- The Fifth Element (1997)
- The Messenger: The Story of Joan of Arc (1999)
- Angel-A (2005)
- Arthur and the Minimoys (2006)
- Arthur and the Revenge of Maltazard (2009)
- The Extraordinary Adventures of Adèle Blanc-Sec (2010)
- Arthur 3: The War of the Two Worlds (2010)
- The Lady (2011)
- The Family (2013)
- Lucy (2014)
- Valerian and the City of a Thousand Planets (2017)
- Anna (2019)
- Dogman (2023)
- June and John (2025)
- Dracula (2025)

== Legacy and honours ==
Besson was nominated for the César Awards for Best Director and Best Film for both Léon: The Professional and The Messenger: The Story of Joan of Arc. He won the Lumière Awards for Best Director and Best Film for Joan of Arc. He won the Lumière Award for Best Director and the Cesar Award for Best Director for The Fifth Element.

Besson's awards also include the Brussels International Festival of Fantasy Film Critics Prize, Fantasporto Audience Jury Award-Special Mention, Best Director, and Best Film, for Le Dernier Combat in 1983; the Italian National Syndicate of Film Journalists Silver Ribbon-Best Director-Foreign Film, for La Femme Nikita, 1990; and the Alexander Korda Award for Best British Film, Nil by Mouth, 1997.

=== Selected film awards ===
Le Dernier Combat

- 1983: Special Jury Prize at the Avoriaz International Fantastic Film Festival
- 1983: Critics’ Prize at the Brussels International Fantastic Film Festival
- 1983: Best Film at the Sitges Film Festival
- 1983: Best Director at the Sitges Film Festival
- 1984: Best Film at Fantasporto
- 1984: Nominated for the César Award for Best First Film
- 1984: Best Director at Fantasporto

Subway

- 1986: Nominated for the César Award for Best Film and the César Award for Best Director
- 1986: Nominated for the BAFTA Award for Best Foreign Film

The Big Blue

- Opening Film at the 1988 Cannes Film Festival
- 1989: Nominated for the César Award for Best Film and the César Award for Best Director

La Femme Nikita

- 1991: Nominated for the César Award for Best Film and the César Award for Best Director
- 1991: Silver Ribbon for Best Director of a Foreign Film
- 1992: Nominated for the Golden Globe for Best Foreign Language Film

Léon : The Professional

- 1995: Nominated for the César Award for Best Film and the César Award for Best Director
- 1996: Czech Lion Award for Best Foreign Film
- 1996 : Japanese Academy Awards : Best foreign film

The Fifth Element

- 1998: Wins the César Award for Best Director. Nominated for the César Award for Best Film
- 1998: Lumière Award for Best Director
- 1998 : Nominated for the Best Science-Fiction Film at the Saturn Awards

Taxi (1998)

- 1999: Nominated for the César Award for Best Film as a producer

The Messenger: The Story of Joan of Arc

- 2000: Nominated for the César Award for Best Film and the César Award for Best Director
- 2000: Lumière Award for Best Film and Best Director

Arthur and the Minimoys

- 2011: Nominated for the César Award for Best Animated Film

Lucy

- 2015: Nominated at the Saturn Award for the Best Action/Adventure Film

Valérian and the City of a Thousand Planets

- 2018: Saturn Award: nominated for Best Science Fiction Film
- 2018: European Film Award: Audience Award for Luc Besson

Dogman

- 2023: In competition at the Venice Film Festival
- 2023: Golden Graffetta for Best Film at the Venice Film Festival

Dracula

- 2025: In competition at the Sitges Film Festival
- 2026: Unifrance Award for being the French film with the best international reception in 2025

=== Selected career awards ===
- 2002: Special Grand Prize of the Americas at the Montreal World Film Festival for his contribution to cinema
- 2016 : was awarded the Inkpot Award

At a later evening during the 40th César Awards ceremony in 2015, Besson received the Gold Medal from the Academy of Cinema Arts and Techniques for his “exceptional artistic and entrepreneurial contribution to French cinema over three decades.”

== Personal life ==
Besson has been married four times; first, in 1986, to the actress Anne Parillaud. They had a daughter, Juliette, born in 1987. Parillaud starred in Besson's La Femme Nikita (1990). They divorced in 1991. Besson’s second wife was actress and director Maïwenn Le Besco. They began their relationship when Besson was 31 and Maïwenn was 15. In 1992, they were married and their daughter, Shanna, was born on 3 January 1993. The couple divorced in 1997. Their unions have been criticised, particularly because Maïwenn still defends her former private relationship with the director, and has said that she was hurt by criticism in the past. Maïwenn has stated that Léon: The Professional (1994) was partly inspired by their relationship. Their marriage ended in 1997, when Besson became involved with actress Milla Jovovich, then 22, during the production of The Fifth Element (1997). "We sensed the special chemistry between us immediately at the auditions and it just intensified during the filming of the movie", said Jovovich. Besson married Jovovich on December 14, 1997, They divorced in 1999. On August 28 2004, Besson married film producer Virginie Silla. They have three children, including the actress Thalia Besson.

=== Allegations and court verdict ===
In 2018, Dutch-Belgian actress Sand Van Roy, who appeared in Valerian and the City of a Thousand Planets, accused Besson of rape. The director's lawyer, Thierry Marembert, stated that Besson "categorically denies these fantasist accusations" and that the accuser was "someone he knows, towards whom he has never behaved inappropriately".

In February 2019, French prosecutors dropped the case against him, citing lack of evidence. In December 2021, a judge dismissed the case against Besson following a second investigation. The public prosecutor's office in Paris stated that "the investigations clearly establish that the criminal facts of rape were not committed, that the absence of consent of the civil party is not established and the existence of a constraint, threat, violence, is not characterized". In April 2022, Sand Van Roy submitted a complaint against the magistrate in charge of the case. In June 2023, Besson was acquitted by the Court of Cassation, the highest judicial court in France. This ruling prevents Van Roy from suing him on the same charges in France or elsewhere in Europe.

At the beginning of 2025, the Belgian courts (where Sand Van Roy had also filed a complaint) also ruled in favor of Luc Besson by deeming the actress's complaint inadmissible.

Several other women, including a former assistant, two students of Cité du Cinéma studio, and a former employee of Besson's EuropaCorp, who all wished to remain anonymous, described "inappropriate sexual behavior" by the director. They did not press charges and avoided a defamation countersuit. Their statements were not used by the investigating judge.

== Music videos ==
- "Pull Marine": Isabelle Adjani (1983)
- "Mon légionnaire": Serge Gainsbourg (1988)
- "Que mon cœur lâche": Mylène Farmer (1992)
- "Love Profusion": Madonna (2003)
- "I Feel Everything": Cara Delevingne (2017)

== Notes ==
Awards and achievements
Preceded by Patrice Leconte for Ridicule	César Award for Best Director for The Fifth Element; 1998	Succeeded by Patrice Chéreau for Those Who Love Me Can Take the Train
