= 2002 Stinkers Bad Movie Awards =

Award ceremony presented by the Stinkers Bad Movie Awards in 2002

25th Stinkers Bad Movie Awards
- Date: March 16, 2003

Highlights
- Worst Film: Swept Away
- Most awards: Rollerball and Swept Away (3)
- Most nominations: Pinocchio (9)

The 25th Stinkers Bad Movie Awards were released by the Hastings Bad Cinema Society on March 16, 2003, to honour the worst films the film industry had to offer in 2002. Pinocchio received the most nominations with nine. All nominees and winners, with respective percentages of votes for each category, are listed below. Dishonourable mentions are also featured for Worst Picture (56 total).

== Winners and nominees ==
=== Worst Film ===
Film	Percentage of Votes
Swept Away (Screen Gems)	37%
The Adventures of Pluto Nash (Warner Bros.)	3%
Kung Pow: Enter the Fist (Fox)	17%
The Master of Disguise (Sony)	20%
Pinocchio (Medusa Distribuzione, Miramax)	23%

==== Dishonourable Mentions ====
- Abandon (Paramount)
- All the Queen's Men (Strand)
- Analyze That (Warner Bros.)
- Austin Powers in Goldmember (New Line)
- Bad Company (Touchstone)
- Ballistic: Ecks vs. Sever (Warner Bros.)
- Big Fat Liar (Universal)
- Big Trouble (Touchstone)
- Blade II (New Line)
- Collateral Damage (Warner Bros.)
- The Country Bears (Disney)
- Crossroads (Paramount)
- D-Tox (DEJ)
- Deuces Wild (MGM)
- Divine Secrets of the Ya-Ya Sisterhood (Warner Bros.)
- Dragonfly (Universal)
- Eight Crazy Nights (Sony)
- Enough (Sony)
- Extreme Ops (Paramount)
- FeardotCom (Warner Bros.)
- Femme Fatale (Warner Bros.)
- Formula 51 (Sony)
- Ghost Ship (Warner Bros.)
- Half Past Dead (Sony)
- Halloween: Resurrection (Dimension)
- Hansel & Gretel (Warner Bros.)
- High Crimes (FOX)
- Impostor (Dimension)
- Jason X (New Line)
- Juwanna Mann (Warner Bros.)
- Life or Something Like It (FOX)
- Men in Black II (Sony)
- Mr. Deeds (Sony)
- The New Guy (Sony)
- Panic Room (Sony)
- Queen of the Damned (Warner Bros.)
- Return to Never Land (Disney)
- Rollerball (MGM)
- Scooby-Doo (Warner Bros.)
- The Scorpion King (Universal)
- Serving Sara (Paramount)
- Showtime (Warner Bros.)
- Signs (Touchstone)
- Slackers (Sony)
- Snow Dogs (Disney)
- Solaris (FOX)
- Sorority Boys (Touchstone)
- Star Wars: Episode II – Attack of the Clones (FOX)
- Stealing Harvard (Sony)
- Super Troopers (FOX)
- The Sweetest Thing (Sony)
- The Time Machine (DreamWorks)
- The Truth About Charlie (Universal)
- Van Wilder (Artisan)
- Vulgar (Lionsgate)

=== Worst Director ===
Recipient	Percentage of Votes
John McTiernan for Rollerball	33%
Roberto Benigni for Pinocchio	24%
Brian De Palma for Femme Fatale	3%
Guy Ritchie for Swept Away	30%
Ron Underwood for The Adventures of Pluto Nash	10%

=== Worst Actor ===
Recipient	Percentage of Votes
Tom Green in Stealing Harvard	29%
Roberto Benigni & Breckin Meyer channelling Martin Short as the dubbed English voice of Roberto Benigni in Pinocchio	13%
Dana Carvey in The Master of Disguise	16%
Eddie Murphy in The Adventures of Pluto Nash, I Spy, and Showtime	19%
Steven Seagal in Half Past Dead	23%

=== Worst Actress ===
Recipient	Percentage of Votes
Madonna in Swept Away	46%
Lucy Liu in Ballistic: Ecks vs. Sever	7%
Jennifer Lopez in Enough	17%
Rebecca Romijn-Stamos in Femme Fatale and Rollerball	10%
Britney Spears in Crossroads	20%

=== Worst Supporting Actor ===
Recipient	Percentage of Votes
Hayden Christensen in Star Wars Episode II: Attack of the Clones	40%
Peter Falk in Undisputed	3%
John Malkovich in Knockaround Guys	20%
Randy Quaid in The Adventures of Pluto Nash	23%
Christopher Walken in The Country Bears	14%

=== Worst Supporting Actress ===
Recipient	Percentage of Votes
Madonna in Die Another Day	47%
Aaliyah in Queen of the Damned	23%
Lara Flynn Boyle in Men in Black II	20%
Deborah Harry in Deuces Wild	7%
Isabella Rossellini in Empire	3%

=== Worst Screenplay for a Film Grossing More Than $100M Worldwide Using Hollywood Math ===
Recipient	Percentage of Votes
Scooby-Doo (Warner Bros.), story by James Gunn and Craig Titley, screenplay by Gunn; based on the Scooby-Doo franchise	33%
Men in Black II (Columbia), story by Robert Gordon, screenplay by Gordon and Barry Fanaro	24%
Pinocchio (Medusa Distribuzione, Miramax), written by Vincenzo Cerami and Roberto Benigni	20%
Star Wars Episode II: Attack of the Clones (Fox), story by George Lucas, screenplay by Lucas and Jonathan Hales	13%
XXX (Sony), written by Rich Wilkes	10%

=== Most Painfully Unfunny Comedy ===
Recipient	Percentage of Votes
Kung Pow: Enter the Fist (Fox)	24%
The Master of Disguise (Sony)	24%
The Adventures of Pluto Nash (Warner Bros.)	17%
Pinocchio (Medusa Distribuzione, Miramax)	15%
Scooby-Doo (Warner Bros.)	20%

=== Worst Song or Song Performance in a Film or Its End Credits ===
Recipient	Percentage of Votes
"The Penis Song" by Cameron Diaz, Christina Applegate, and Selma Blair from The Sweetest Thing	40%
"Black Suits Comin' (Nod Ya Head)" by Will Smith from Men in Black II	10%
"The Chanukkah Song Part 3" by Adam Sandler from Eight Crazy Nights	20%
"Die Another Day" by Madonna from Die Another Day	13%
"I'm Not a Girl, Not Yet a Woman" by Britney Spears from Crossroads	17%

=== Most Intrusive Musical Score ===
Recipient	Percentage of Votes
Divine Secrets of the Ya-Ya Sisterhood (Warner Bros.)	31%
Pinocchio (Medusa Distribuzione, Miramax)	12%
Punch-Drunk Love (Columbia)	16%
Scooby-Doo (Warner Bros.)	22%
Swept Away (Screen Gems)	19%

=== Worst On-Screen Couple ===
Recipient	Percentage of Votes
Madonna and Adriano Giannini in Swept Away	29%
Woody Allen and any actress decades younger in Hollywood Ending	19%
Roberto Benigni and his dubbed English voice in Pinocchio	3%
Eddie Murphy and anyone forced to co-star with him in The Adventures of Pluto Nash, I Spy, and Showtime	26%
Britney Spears and Anson Mount in Crossroads	22%

=== Worst Fake Accent (Male) ===
Recipient	Percentage of Votes
Harrison Ford in K-19: The Widowmaker	42%
Dan Aykroyd in Crossroads	6%
Dana Carvey in The Master of Disguise	29%
John Malkovich in Knockaround Guys	13%
Rob Schneider in Adam Sandler's Eight Crazy Nights and The Hot Chick	10%

=== Worst Fake Accent (Female) ===
Recipient	Percentage of Votes
Rebecca Romijn-Stamos in Femme Fatale and Rollerball	40%
Illeana Douglas in The New Guy	20%
Ashley Judd in Frida	17%
Isabella Rossellini in Empire	10%
Maggie Smith in Divine Secrets of the Ya-Ya Sisterhood	13%

=== Most Annoying Non-Human Character ===
Recipient	Percentage of Votes
Scrappy-Doo in Scooby-Doo	35%
Dobby the House Elf in Harry Potter and the Chamber of Secrets	9%
Jar Jar Binks in Star Wars Episode II: Attack of the Clones	29%
The New and Not Improved Computer-Generated Scooby-Doo in Scooby-Doo	12%
Whitey in Adam Sandler's Eight Crazy Nights	15%

- Note: Michael Jackson was not eligible in this category.

=== Worst Sequel ===
Recipient	Percentage of Votes
Analyze That (Warner Bros.)	40%
Halloween: Resurrection (Dimension)	17%
Jason X (New Line)	13%
Men in Black II (Columbia)	20%
Pokémon 4Ever (Toho)	10%

=== Worst Remake ===
Recipient	Percentage of Votes
Rollerball (MGM)	40%
Mr. Deeds (Columbia)	13%
Pinocchio (Medusa Distribuzione, Miramax)	17%
Swept Away (Screen Gems)	23%
The Truth About Charlie (Universal)	7%

=== Worst On-Screen Group ===
Recipient	Percentage of Votes
The Most Miscast Voice Ensemble in Motion Picture History in Pinocchio	33%
The Country Bears in The Country Bears	20%
The Entire Cast of Jackass: The Movie	30%
Those Meddling Kids in Scooby-Doo	7%
The Ya-Yas in Divine Secrets of the Ya-Ya Sisterhood	10%

=== Most Distracting Celebrity Cameo Appearance ===
Recipient	Percentage of Votes
Michael Jackson in Men in Black II	37%
Pamela Anderson in Scooby-Doo	17%
Elton John in The Country Bears	13%
Madonna in Die Another Day	23%
John McEnroe in Mr. Deeds	10%

=== Worst Resurrection of a TV Show ===
Recipient	Percentage of Votes
I Spy (Columbia)	67%
Scooby-Doo (Warner Bros.)	33%

== Films with multiple wins and nominations ==
The following films received multiple nominations:

Nominations	Film
9	Pinocchio
7	Scooby-Doo
6	The Adventures of Pluto Nash
6	Swept Away
5	Men in Black II
4	Crossroads
4	The Master of Disguise
4	Rollerball
3	The Country Bears
3	Die Another Day
3	Divine Secrets of the Ya-Ya Sisterhood
3	Eight Crazy Nights
3	Femme Fatale
3	I Spy
3	Star Wars Episode II: Attack of the Clones
2	Empire
2	Knockaround Guys
2	Kung Pow: Enter the Fist
2	Mr. Deeds
2	Showtime

The following films received multiple wins:

Wins	Film
3	Rollerball
3	Swept Away
2	Scooby-Doo
