= Showtime (film) =

2002 film by Tom Dey

- Theatrical release poster
- Directed by: Tom Dey
- Screenplay by: Keith Sharon; Alfred Gough; Miles Millar
- Story by: Jorge Saralegui
- Produced by: Jorge Saralegui; Jane Rosenthal
- Starring: Robert De Niro; Eddie Murphy; Rene Russo; Frankie R. Faison; William Shatner
- Cinematography: Thomas Kloss
- Edited by: Billy Weber
- Music by: Alan Silvestri
- Production companies: Village Roadshow Pictures; NPV Entertainment; Material Pictures; TriBeCa Productions
- Distributed by: Warner Bros. Pictures
- Release date: March 15, 2002
- Running time: 95 minutes
- Country: United States
- Language: English
- Budget: $85 million
- Box office: $77.7 million

Showtime is a 2002 American buddy cop action comedy film directed by Tom Dey. The film stars Robert De Niro and Eddie Murphy alongside Rene Russo, William Shatner, Pedro Damian and De Niro's real-life daughter Drena De Niro. It was released in the United States on March 15, 2002, by Warner Bros. Pictures. It received generally negative reviews, with critics lamenting its lackluster humor and poor attempt to satirize the buddy-cop genre, and was a box office bomb, grossing $77.7 million against an $85 million budget. It received two nominations at the 23rd Golden Raspberry Awards: Worst Actor (for Murphy), and Worst Screen Combo (for Murphy and De Niro).

== Plot ==
Two LAPD cops, Detective Mitch Preston and Officer Trey Sellars, both from the Central Division, are paired for a television police reality show and run into trouble with a crime lord. Mitch shoots a news camera after a failed confrontation with local drug dealer Lazy Boy, who escapes by using a custom-built armor-piercing gun. Maxxis Television, the network employing the cameraman, filed a $10 million lawsuit against the police department. They offered to drop the suit if Mitch agreed to star in their new police reality show—a project Trey quickly dubbed Showtime!—and the captain eagerly approved to secure much-needed positive public relations.

Trey is an LAPD officer who struggles with the department's investigator examination and is an aspiring actor. He pays a friend to snatch the purse of the show's producer, Chase Renzi, then retrieves it after a staged fight scene. Although the deception is embarrassingly revealed, Chase is impressed and signs Trey anyway. It is quickly revealed that the show's producers have little interest in filming an actual police officer's existence; they build a mini-movie set in the middle of the station and replace Mitch's nondescript personal car with a Humvee while Trey drives a C5 Corvette. They also hire William Shatner (who once played T. J. Hooker) to give both men tips on how to act. But while Trey is eager to learn, Mitch is merely annoyed.

Despite all of this, Mitch tries to investigate the mysterious supergun, which is subsequently used by arms dealer Caesar Vargas to kill the drug dealer and his girlfriend. Through a clever ruse by Trey, they can get the arms dealer's name from Re-Run, the dead dealer's henchman. However, Vargas is less than cooperative, which causes a brawl at his nightclub. Trey and Mitch defeat him and his henchmen, and they have a relatively friendly conversation on their way home. However, Mitch's good humor evaporates when he finds that, in his absence, the Showtime! producers have drastically remodeled his house and have given him a retired German Shepherd police dog, Powder, as a pet.

Vargas and his squad assault an armored car and kill the crew, and devastate the police who respond. Trey and Mitch arrive and are pulled into the shootout. When the attackers flee in a garbage truck, Mitch gives chase in a police car. In the ensuing mayhem, the car is rammed by the garbage truck, which crashes into a construction site. Mitch survives by jumping from the police car to Trey's sports car (he had previously denounced "hood-jumping" as a useless skill). In the wake of the disaster, the police chief pulls the plug on the show, suspends Mitch from duty, and demotes Trey back to patrol.

With the show over, Mitch's car is returned, and his apartment is restored (though he refuses to return Powder, whom he has grown fond of). While watching the final episode, Mitch phones Trey to apologize for his actions and offers to help him study for the investigator exam. However, while doing so, Mitch sees one of his police colleagues at Vargas's nightclub. He and Trey investigate and find that Vargas is selling the weapons at a gun show at the Bonaventure Hotel. Vargas flees with one of the weapons, taking Chase hostage in the process. The duo can rescue her via a pocket pistol concealed in a Maxxis camera, but the ceiling of the room is shot. It is located just below the pool, so it floods, and Vargas is washed out the window to his death, but Trey and Mitch barely survive after handcuffing themselves together. They end up suspended from a broken beam outside the hotel.

Following the collapse of Vargres's operations, Trey finally passed his exam and earned a promotion to detective, officially partnering with Mitch on a brand-new case. There are hints of a romance between Chase and Mitch. Showtime! is revived for a second season, this time with two attractive female officers who are just as antagonistic as Mitch and Trey.

== Cast ==
- Robert De Niro as Detective Mitch Preston, a pragmatic, camera-shy LAPD detective who is easily annoyed with the show's basis
- Eddie Murphy as Officer Trey Sellars, an LAPD patrol man who failed the police detective examination repeatedly and would-be actor
- Rene Russo as Chase Renzi, the show's director
- Pedro Damian as Cesar Vargas, the owner of an illegal gun
- Mos Def as "Lazy Boy"
- Frankie R. Faison as Captain Winship
- William Shatner as Himself
- Nestor Serrano as Ray
- Drena De Niro as Annie, Chase's coworker
- Linda Hart as Waitress
- TJ Cross as "Re-Run"
- Judah Friedlander as Julio
- Kadeem Hardison as Kylee
- Peter Jacobson as Brad Slocum
- Ken Campbell as Cop in Gym
- John Cariani as Charlie Hertz
- James Roday Rodriguez as Showtime Cameraman
- Rachael Harris as Teacher
- Alex Borstein as Casting Director
- Marshall Manesh as Convenience Store Owner
- Johnnie Cochran as Himself
- Joy Bryant as Lexi
- Maurice Compte as Chili
- Freez Luv as Freez
- Merlin Santana as Hector
- Julian Dulce Vida as J.J.
- Angela Alvarado as Gina Reyes (as Angela Rose Alvarado)
- Larry Joe Campbell as Locker Room Cop #2
- Henry Kingi as Garbage Truck Driver

== Production ==
In December 2000, it was reported that Robert De Niro and Eddie Murphy were in negotiations to star in Showtime!, a comedy described as being built around meta humor centered on buddy cop formulas similar to the approach Scream took to the slasher genre. The original script was written by Keith Sharon with a rewrite by Miles Millar and Alfred Gough. Later that month, Tom Dey was hired as director.

== Soundtrack ==
Showtime: From And Inspired by The Motion Picture

Soundtrack album by various artists
- Released: March 19, 2002
- Studio: The Boxx (Kingston, Jamaica); Idea Lounge; The Ranch Recording Studio (New York, NY); Big Yard Studio (New York, NY); Main Street Studios (Jamaica); Iguana Studio (Toronto, Canada); HC&F Studio (New York, NY); Tracken Place (Los Angeles, CA); Brandon's Way Studio (Hollywood, CA)
- Genre: Dancehall
- Length: 49:38
- Label: MCA
- Producer: Joel Sill (exec.); Michael McQuarn (exec.); Robert Livingston (also exec.); Babyface; Christopher Birch; Dave Kelly; Gordon Dukes; Kardinal Offishall; Richard Browne; Shaggy; Sting International; Tommie "Bishop" McLaughlin; Tony "CD" Kelly

Professional ratings
Review scores
Source	Rating
AllMusic	3/5 stars

From And Inspired By The Motion Picture Showtime, a soundtrack album composed of thirteen songs, was released on March 19, 2002, through MCA Records. Recording sessions took place at The Boxx and Main Street Studios in Kingston, Jamaica, at the Idea Lounge, The Ranch, Big Yard Studio and HC&F Studio in New York, at Iguana Recording Studios in Toronto, Ontario, at the Tracken Place and Brandon's Way Studio in Los Angeles. Production was handled by Dave Kelly, Babyface, Christopher Birch, Gordon Dukes, Kardinal Offishall, Richard Browne, Shaggy, Sting International, Tommie "Bishop" McLaughlin, Tony "CD" Kelly and Robert Livingston, the latter serving as executive producer with Joel Sill and Michael McQuarn. It features contributions from Shaggy, Alias Project, Babyface, Bounty Killer, Brian & Tony Gold, Gordon Dukes, Howzing, Jully Black, Kardinal Offishall, Latrelle, Marsha Morrison, Prince Mydas, Rayvon, Rik Rok, Rude, Sean Paul and T.O.K.

=== Track listing ===
No.	Title	Writer(s)	Producer(s)	Length
1.	"Caramel" (performed by Alias Project and Shaggy)	Orville Richard Burrell; Dave Willard Anthony Kelly; Nigel Staff; Brian Derek Thompson; Ricardo Ducent	Dave Kelly	3:27
2.	"Why" (performed by Rude)	D. Kelly; I. Watson	Dave Kelly	3:33
3.	"Mr. Lover" (performed by Shaggy and Baby)	Burrell; Anthony Kelly; Ducent	Tony "CD" Kelly	3:54
4.	"My Bad" (performed by Rayvon)	Bruce Alexander Michael Brewster; D. Kelly	Dave Kelly	3:29
5.	"Lie Till I Die" (performed by Marsha Morrison)	Gordon Edward Dukes; Christopher Birch; Burrell; Ducent	Christopher Birch; Shaggy	4:52
6.	"Man Ah Bad Man" (performed by T.O.K. and Bounty Killer)	Alistaire McCalla; Craig Thompson; Xavier Davidson; Rodney Basil Price; Richard Browne	Richard Browne	2:54
7.	"Money Jane" (performed by Kardinal Offishall, Sean Paul and Jully Black)	Jason Harrow; Sean Paul Ryan Francis Henriques	Kardinal Offishall	4:19
8.	"Your Eyes" (performed by Rik Rok, Brian and Tony Gold)	Ducent; Thompson; Patrick Anthony Morrison; Robert McDonald Livingston; Birch; Burrell	Robert Livingston	4:00
9.	"Fly Away" (performed by Gordon Dukes)	Dukes; Desmond Dottin; Livingston	Gordon Dukes	4:00
10.	"Swingin'" (performed by Shaggy and Latrelle)	Burrell; Andrea-Latrelle Simmons; Tommie Lee McLaughlin; Arlene Aleese Simmons	Tommie 'Bishop' McLaughlin	3:10
11.	"Get the Cash" (performed by Howzing)	R. Ferguson; Shaun Pizzonia	Sting Intl	3:45
12.	"Still the One" (performed by Prince Mydas)	Anthony Hawthorne; Livingston; Birch	Robert Livingston	3:25
13.	"Showtime" (performed by Shaggy and Babyface)	Burrell; Kenneth Brian Edmonds; Reginald D. Griffin	Babyface	4:30
Total length:				49:18

=== Other songs ===
These songs appear in the film but were not released on the soundtrack:

- "So What": written by Tommie McLaughlin and Devon Fredrick Dowdell, performed by Mr. Wrong a.k.a. Bareda (2002)
- "Rueda de fuego (Ring of Fire)": written by June Carter Cash and Merle Kilgore, performed by Mingo Saldivar (1992)
- "Snatch It Back and Hold It": written by Junior Wells and Buddy Guy; performed by Junior Wells (1965)
- "I Got You (I Feel Good)": written and performed by James Brown (1964)
- "What'd I Say": written and performed by Ray Charles (1959)
- "Que Ganas": written by Jorge Luis Piloto and Sergio George, performed by Charlie Cruz (2001)
- "Jumpi": written by Sergent García, Pierre-Luc Jamain, Liván Núñez Alemán, Vincent Jogerst and Simon Andrieux, performed by Sergent García (1999)
- "Ballad of the Green Berets", written by Barry Sadler and Robin Moore, performed by Barry Sadler (1966)
- "Hands Up", written by John E. Rhone, Ontario Haynes and Rodney Price, performed by Bounty Killer

== Reception ==
=== Critical response ===
On Rotten Tomatoes, the film holds an approval rating of 25%, based on 122 reviews, with an average rating of 4.7/10. The site's critics consensus reads: "Showtime starts out as a promising satire of the buddy cop genre. Unfortunately, it ends up becoming the type of movies it is satirizing." On Metacritic, the film has a weighted average score of 32 out of 100, based on 34 critics, indicating "generally unfavorable" reviews. Audiences polled by CinemaScore gave the film an average grade of "B−" on a scale of A+ to F.

Kevin Thomas of the Los Angeles Times praised the filmmakers for adding "a fresh and funny satirical twist" to the buddy cop comedy formula for De Niro and Murphy to play with, saying it "displays an ingenuity, cleverness and briskness that never flags." William Arnold of the Seattle Post-Intelligencer gave praise to both lead actors, calling Murphy "funny and endearingly self-deprecating" as Trey and felt that De Niro's "low-key severity and hard-nosed eccentricity" carried the film along with its "comic bite." Moira Macdonald of The Seattle Times praised Murphy's performance for being "very funny, in a larger-than-life sort of way," but critiqued that De Niro had nothing in the script to elevate his straight man character, felt that Russo and Shatner's roles were "truncated", and criticized the "watered down" satire as the film progresses, calling it an "uneven but frequently engaging comedy". Roger Ebert wrote that the film starts out promising with De Niro and Murphy's interaction, but falters in the action-heavy second half. Ed Gonzalez of Slant Magazine felt the film was a "cutesy satire for the masses, a smug Real World-meets-Cops smorgasbord suffocated by its air of pointlessness." Variety's Todd McCarthy criticized the story for being a "shrill, strained and shallow riff on a tired idea" and the cast for slumming through their roles through "murky, muddy colors". Scott Tobias of The A.V. Club wrote, "[T]epid as a media satire (of what exactly?), rote as an action-suspense film, Showtime is notable mainly for its breathtaking stupidity."

The film received two nominations at the 23rd Golden Raspberry Awards: Worst Actor for Eddie Murphy (also for The Adventures of Pluto Nash and I Spy) and Worst Screen Couple for Murphy and Robert De Niro (also for The Adventures of Pluto Nash with himself and I Spy with Owen Wilson). It lost both awards to Roberto Benigni and Breckin Meyer (Pinocchio) and Adriano Giannini and Madonna (Swept Away) respectively.
