= Femme Fatale (2002 film) =

2002 mystery film by Brian De Palma

- Theatrical release poster
- Directed by: Brian De Palma
- Written by: Brian De Palma
- Produced by: Tarak Ben Ammar; Marina Gefter
- Starring: Antonio Banderas; Rebecca Romijn; Peter Coyote; Gregg Henry; Rie Rasmussen
- Cinematography: Thierry Arbogast
- Edited by: Bill Pankow
- Music by: Ryuichi Sakamoto
- Production company: Quinta Communications
- Distributed by: ARP Sélection (France); Solo Film Verleih (Germany); Warner Bros. Pictures (English-speaking territories); Summit Entertainment (International)
- Release dates: 30 April 2002 (France); 6 November 2002 (United States); 27 March 2003 (Germany)
- Running time: 110 minutes
- Countries: France; Germany; United States
- Languages: English; French
- Budget: $30-35 million
- Box office: $16.8 million

Femme Fatale is a 2002 neo-noir erotic thriller film written and directed by Brian De Palma. The film stars Antonio Banderas and Rebecca Romijn. It was screened out of competition at the 2002 Cannes Film Festival.

Upon its release, Femme Fatale received mixed reviews from film critics and became a box office flop. However, the film has since been better received by many critics and gradually regarded as a cult classic. Warner Bros. Pictures had included the film in the catalogue of Warner Archive Collection. In May 2022, Shout! Factory (under license from Warner Bros) released a special edition Blu-ray of the film.

== Plot ==
Mercenary thief Laure Ash is part of a team executing a diamond heist at the Cannes Film Festival. The diamonds are located on a gold ensemble worn by model Veronica, who is accompanying real-life director Régis Wargnier to the premiere of his film East/West. Laure seduces Veronica in order to obtain the diamonds, during which her accomplices "Black Tie" and Racine provide support. However, the heist is botched and Laure ends up double-crossing her accomplices and escaping to Paris with the diamonds. In Paris, a series of events causes Laure to be mistaken for a Parisian woman named Lily who had recently disappeared. While Laure luxuriates in a tub in Lily's home, she witnesses the real Lily return and commit suicide, providing Laure the opportunity to take her identity for good, and she leaves the country for the United States.

Seven years later, Laure (in her identity as "Lily") resurfaces in Paris as the wife of Bruce Watts, the new American ambassador to France. After arriving in France, a Spanish paparazzo named Nicolas Bardo takes her picture. The picture is displayed around Paris, and Black Tie (who has coincidentally been released from prison seven years after being arrested for the heist) spots Bardo's photo while in the middle of killing a woman, seen talking earlier with Laure at a café, by throwing her into the path of a passing truck. With Laure exposed to her vengeful ex-accomplices, she decides to frame Bardo for her own (staged) kidnapping. Bardo is further manipulated by Laure into following through with the "kidnapping", and in the process, they begin a sexual relationship. The pair eventually meet with Bruce for a ransom exchange; however, Bardo has a crisis of conscience at the last moment and sabotages the scheme. In retaliation, Laure executes both Bruce and Bardo, only to be surprised by her ex-accomplices afterwards, who promptly throw her off a bridge to her seeming death.

In an extended twist ending, the entirety of the film's events after Laure enters the tub in Lily's home are revealed to be a dream. In reality, Laure spies Lily entering the home as before, but this time Laure stops Lily from committing suicide and persuades her to leave the country and start a new life with Bruce. Seven years later, Laure and Veronica, who is revealed to have been Laure's partner and lover all along, chat about the success of their diamond caper. Veronica tells Laure that they should go their separate ways to avoid suspicion of being seen together, effectively ending their relationship. Black Tie and Racine arrive seeking revenge but are indirectly killed by the same truck that killed Veronica in Laure's dream. Laure and Veronica share one last look, nodding to each other. Bardo, witnessing all these events, introduces himself to Laure and asks if he has met her before, with Laure replying, "Only in my dreams."

== Cast ==
- Rebecca Romijn as Laure Ash / Lily Watts
- Antonio Banderas as Nicolas Bardo
- Peter Coyote as Ambassador Bruce Hewitt Watts
- Eriq Ebouaney as Black Tie
- Édouard Montoute as Racine
- Rie Rasmussen as Veronica
- Thierry Frémont as Inspector Serra
- Gregg Henry as Shiff
- Éva Darlan as Irma
- Fiona Curzon as Stanfield Phillips
- Régis Wargnier as himself

John Stamos has an uncredited voice cameo as Bardo's agent.

== Production ==
In September 2000, it was reported that producer Tarak Ben Ammar would be financing Femme Fatale, a thriller to be written and directed by Brian De Palma to be directed in a stylish homage to French film noirs of the 40s. In February 2001, it was reported that Antonio Banderas had joined the film as the male lead Nicolas Bardo. Casting for the female lead Laure Ash proved to be a bit more difficult as according to producer Marina Gefter, Brian De Palma wanted a "sexy Rita Hayworth type" which proved to be difficult to secure. Several actresses were considered for the lead including Uma Thurman, but De Palma ultimately cast Rebecca Romijn-Stamos as the lead.

== Reception ==
=== Box office ===
The film was a box office bomb, taking in less than its production costs worldwide. It grossed $6.6 million domestically and $10 million internationally for a worldwide total of $16.8 million. In North America, the film played very well in New York, Los Angeles, San Francisco, Toronto and Chicago, but also played weakly in the mid-section of the country. The film generated more than $19.66 million in home video rentals in the United States (significantly higher than the film's United States box office gross).

=== Critical reception ===
The film received mixed reviews during its theatrical release. The film has a 49% rating on Rotten Tomatoes based on 137 reviews, with an average rating of 5.5/10. The website's critics consensus reads, "The thriller Femme Fatale is overheated, nonsensical, and silly." Metacritic, which uses a weighted average, assigned the film a score of 60 out of 100, based on 30 critics, indicating "mixed or average" reviews. Audiences polled by CinemaScore gave the film an average grade of "C−" on an A+ to F scale.

Among the critics who praised the film were A.O. Scott of The New York Times and Roger Ebert of the Chicago Sun-Times, the latter of whom gave a 4-star review and called it one of De Palma's best films. Scott wrote, "More than a quarter-century after Obsession, his feverish tribute to Vertigo, Mr. De Palma is still worshiping at the shrine of Hitchcock, as well as indulging in a good deal of auto-homage. Voyeurism, doubles, ambient paranoia -- the director's favorite motifs parade before us, along with winking allusions to Dressed to Kill, Body Double and Blow Out. Though it lacks the prickly, probing sense of human vulnerability that made those movies disturbing as well as exciting, Femme Fatale is far more absorbing and tantalizing than most of the plodding, overworked thrillers the studios churn out these days. Its brazenly illogical plot twists should embarrass lesser filmmakers who tout mechanical, uninteresting surprise endings." Ebert wrote, "Sly as a snake, Brian De Palma's Femme Fatale is a sexy thriller that coils back on itself in seductive deception. This is pure filmmaking, elegant and slippery. I haven't had as much fun second-guessing a movie since Mulholland Drive."

At the 2002 Stinkers Bad Movie Awards, the film received nominations for Worst Director (De Palma) and Worst Actress (Romijn-Stamos, also for Rollerball). Romijn-Stamos ended up winning Worst Female Fake Accent for this film and Rollerball. Since then, Femme Fatale has been revived in the eyes of many critics. The film has since developed a cult status amongst cinephiles.
