= Light It Up (soundtrack) =

Music From & Inspired by Light It Up the Movie

Soundtrack album by various artists
- Released: November 9, 1999
- Recorded: 1998–99
- Genre: Hip hop; R&B; gangsta rap
- Length: 54:41
- Label: Yab Yum; Elektra
- Producer: Michael McQuarn (exec.); Tracey Edmonds (exec.)

Singles from Light It Up
- 1. "Light It Up" Released: 1999

Professional ratings
Review scores
Source	Rating
AllMusic	2/5 stars

Music From and Inspired by Light It Up the Movie is the original soundtrack album to Craig Bolotin's 1999 drama film Light It Up. It was released on November 9, 1999 through Yab Yum/Elektra Records and consisted mainly of hip hop and R&B music. Executively produced by Michael McQuarn and Tracey Edmonds, the album features contributions from 112, Amil, AZ, Beanie Sigel, Beverly Crowder, Blaze Da Tyrant, DMX, Fredro Starr, Ja Rule, Jon B., Master P, *NSYNC, Outkast, Shya, Slimm Calhoun and Solé. The soundtrack was a huge success, peaking at #19 on the Billboard 200 and #4 on the Top R&B/Hip-Hop Albums and featured one charting single, "How Many Wanna". On December 6, 1999, the soundtrack was certified gold by the Recording Industry Association of America.

== Track listing ==
1. "How Many Wanna" – 4:32 (Ja Rule)
2. "Catz Don't Know" – 4:19 (DMX)
3. "That's Real" – 5:03 (AZ & Beanie Sigel)
4. "First One Hit" – 4:56 (Amil & Solé)
5. "High Schoolin'" – 4:18 (Outkast featuring Slimm Calhoun)
6. "Light It Up" – 3:25 (Master P featuring The No Limit All Stars (Silkk The Shocker, C-Murder & Mystikal))
7. "Waiting in Vain" – 4:42 (Jon B.)
8. "Anything" – 3:49 (112)
9. "Here" – 4:20 (Beverly Crowder)
10. "Burgundy" – 3:55 (Shya)
11. "If Only In Heaven's Eyes" – 4:37 (*NSYNC)
12. "Free to Believe" – 5:42 (Jack Herrera)
13. "Ghetto's a Battlefield" – 5:04 (Blaze & Firestarr)

== Charts ==
Chart (2000)	Peak position
US Billboard 200	19
US Top R&B/Hip-Hop Albums (Billboard)	4

== Certifications ==
Region	Certification	Certified units/sales
United States (RIAA)	Gold	500,000^{^}
^{^} Shipments figures based on certification alone.
