= 23rd Golden Raspberry Awards =

Award ceremony presented by the Golden Raspberry Award Foundation in 2002

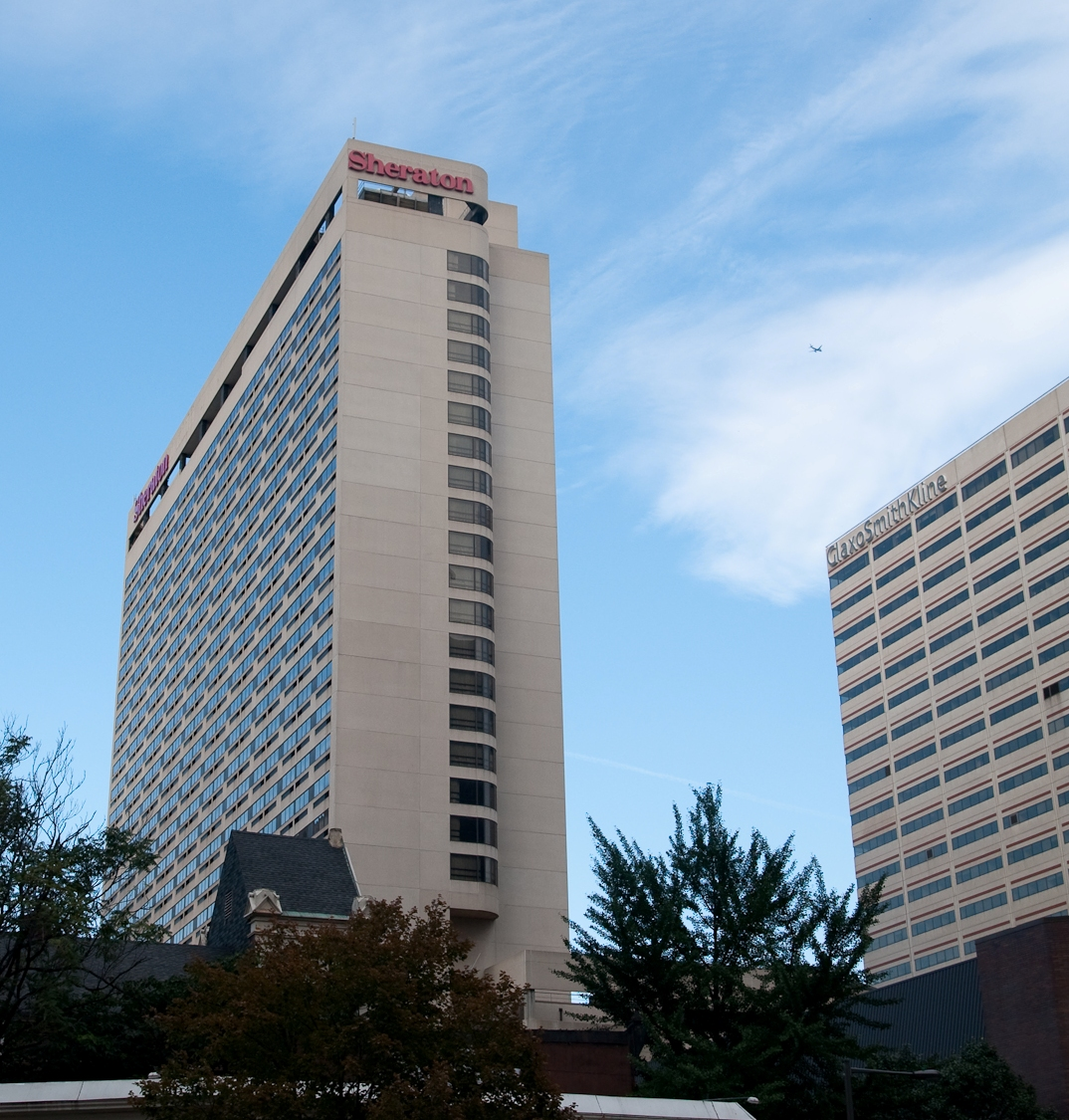
- The 23rd Golden Raspberry Awards ceremony was held at the Sheraton Hotel.
- Date: March 22, 2003
- Site: Sheraton Hotel, Santa Monica, California

Highlights
- Worst Picture: Swept Away
- Most awards: Swept Away (5)
- Most nominations: Crossroads (8)

The 23rd Golden Raspberry Awards were held on March 22, 2003 at the Sheraton Hotel in Santa Monica, California to recognize the worst the movie industry had to offer in 2002. Pinocchio became the first foreign language film to be nominated for a Golden Raspberry Award for Worst Picture, and Madonna won Razzies for both Worst Actress (tied with Britney Spears) and Supporting Actress. The one-time-only category introduced this year was "Most Flatulent Teen-Targeted Movie".

== Awards and nominations ==
Winner (in bold)

Category		Recipient
Worst Picture		**Swept Away (Screen Gems)**
Worst Picture		The Adventures of Pluto Nash (Warner Bros.)
Worst Picture		Crossroads (Paramount)
Worst Picture		Pinocchio (Miramax)
Worst Picture		Star Wars: Episode II – Attack of the Clones (Fox)
Worst Actor	Roberto Benigni Breckin Meyer	**Roberto Benigni in Pinocchio as Pinocchio (dubbed Godzilla-style by Breckin Meyer)**
Worst Actor	Roberto Benigni Breckin Meyer	Adriano Giannini in Swept Away as Giuseppe
Worst Actor	Roberto Benigni Breckin Meyer	Eddie Murphy in The Adventures of Pluto Nash, I Spy, and Showtime as Pluto Nash/Rex Crater, Kelly Robinson and Off. Trey Sellars (respectively)
Worst Actor	Roberto Benigni Breckin Meyer	Adam Sandler in Eight Crazy Nights and Mr. Deeds as Davey Stone/Whitey/Eleanore/Deer and Longfellow Deeds (respectively)
Worst Actor	Roberto Benigni Breckin Meyer	Steven Seagal in Half Past Dead as Sasha Petrosevitch
Worst Actress	Madonna Britney Spears	**Madonna in Swept Away as Amber Leighton (tie)**
Worst Actress	Madonna Britney Spears	**Britney Spears in Crossroads as Lucy Wagner (tie)**
Worst Actress	Madonna Britney Spears	Angelina Jolie in Life or Something Like It as Lanie Kerrigan
Worst Actress	Madonna Britney Spears	Jennifer Lopez in Enough and Maid in Manhattan as Slim Hiller and Marisa Ventura (respectively)
Worst Actress	Madonna Britney Spears	Winona Ryder in Mr. Deeds as Babe Bennett
Worst Supporting Actor	Hayden Christensen	**Hayden Christensen in Star Wars: Episode II – Attack of the Clones as Anakin Skywalker**
Worst Supporting Actor	Hayden Christensen	Tom Green in Stealing Harvard as Walter "Duff" Duffy
Worst Supporting Actor	Hayden Christensen	Freddie Prinze Jr. in Scooby-Doo as Fred Jones
Worst Supporting Actor	Hayden Christensen	Christopher Walken in The Country Bears as Reed Thimple
Worst Supporting Actor	Hayden Christensen	Robin Williams in Death to Smoochy as Rainbow Randolph Smiley
Worst Supporting Actress	Madonna	**Madonna in Die Another Day as Verity**
Worst Supporting Actress	Madonna	Lara Flynn Boyle in Men in Black II as Serleena
Worst Supporting Actress	Madonna	Bo Derek (as herself) in The Master of Disguise
Worst Supporting Actress	Madonna	Natalie Portman in Star Wars: Episode II – Attack of the Clones as Padmé Amidala
Worst Supporting Actress	Madonna	Rebecca Romijn in Rollerball as Aurora
Worst Screen Couple	Adriano Giannini Madonna	**Adriano Giannini and Madonna in Swept Away**
Worst Screen Couple	Adriano Giannini Madonna	Roberto Benigni and Nicoletta Braschi in Pinocchio
Worst Screen Couple	Adriano Giannini Madonna	Hayden Christensen and Natalie Portman in Star Wars: Episode II – Attack of the Clones
Worst Screen Couple	Adriano Giannini Madonna	Eddie Murphy and either Robert De Niro in Showtime, Owen Wilson in I Spy, or himself cloned in The Adventures of Pluto Nash
Worst Screen Couple	Adriano Giannini Madonna	Britney Spears and "whatever-his-name-was" (Anson Mount) in Crossroads
Worst Remake or Sequel		**Swept Away (Screen Gems)**
Worst Remake or Sequel		I Spy (Columbia)
Worst Remake or Sequel		Mr. Deeds (Columbia/New Line)
Worst Remake or Sequel		Pinocchio (Miramax)
Worst Remake or Sequel		Star Wars: Episode II – Attack of the Clones (Fox)
Worst Director	Guy Ritchie	**Guy Ritchie for Swept Away**
Worst Director	Guy Ritchie	Roberto Benigni for Pinocchio
Worst Director	Guy Ritchie	Tamra Davis for Crossroads
Worst Director	Guy Ritchie	George Lucas for Star Wars: Episode II – Attack of the Clones
Worst Director	Guy Ritchie	Ron Underwood for The Adventures of Pluto Nash
Worst Screenplay	George Lucas	**Star Wars: Episode II – Attack of the Clones, screenplay by George Lucas and Jonathan Hales**
Worst Screenplay	George Lucas	The Adventures of Pluto Nash, written by Neil Cuthbert
Worst Screenplay	George Lucas	Crossroads, written by Shonda Rhimes
Worst Screenplay	George Lucas	Pinocchio, screenplay by Vincenzo Cerami and Roberto Benigni, based on The Adventures of Pinocchio by Carlo Collodi
Worst Screenplay	George Lucas	Swept Away, screenplay by Guy Ritchie
Worst Original Song	Max Martin Dido	**"I'm Not a Girl, Not Yet a Woman" from Crossroads by Max Martin, Rami and Dido Armstrong**
Worst Original Song	Max Martin Dido	"Die Another Day" from Die Another Day by Madonna and Mirwais Ahmadzaï
Worst Original Song	Max Martin Dido	"Overprotected" from Crossroads by Max Martin and Rami
Most Flatulent Teen-Targeted Movie		**Jackass: The Movie (Paramount)**
Most Flatulent Teen-Targeted Movie		Crossroads (Paramount)
Most Flatulent Teen-Targeted Movie		Eight Crazy Nights (Columbia)
Most Flatulent Teen-Targeted Movie		Scooby-Doo (Warner Bros.)
Most Flatulent Teen-Targeted Movie		XXX (Columbia/Revolution)

== Films with multiple nominations and wins ==
These films garnered multiple nominations:

Nominations	Films
8	Crossroads
7	Star Wars: Episode II – Attack of the Clones
7	Swept Away
6	Pinocchio
5	The Adventures of Pluto Nash
3	I Spy
3	Mr. Deeds
2	Die Another Day
2	Eight Crazy Nights
2	Scooby-Doo
2	Showtime

These films won multiple awards:

Wins	Films
5	Swept Away
2	Crossroads
2	Star Wars: Episode II – Attack of the Clones

== See also ==
- 2002 in film
- 75th Academy Awards
- 56th British Academy Film Awards
- 60th Golden Globe Awards
- 9th Screen Actors Guild Awards
