= Rollerball (2002 film) =

2002 film by John McTiernan

- Theatrical release poster
- Directed by: John McTiernan
- Screenplay by: Larry Ferguson; John Pogue
- Based on: Roller Ball Murder by William Harrison; Rollerball by William Harrison
- Produced by: John McTiernan; Charles Roven; Beau St. Clair
- Starring: Chris Klein; Jean Reno; LL Cool J; Rebecca Romijn; Naveen Andrews
- Cinematography: Steve Mason
- Edited by: Robert K. Lambert; John Wright
- Music by: Éric Serra
- Production companies: Metro-Goldwyn-Mayer Pictures; Mosaic Media Group
- Distributed by: Buena Vista International; Helkon Filmverleih (Germany); Toho-Towa (Japan); MGM Distribution Co. (United States and Canada); Columbia Pictures (International)
- Release dates: February 8, 2002 (United States); March 28, 2002 (Germany); May 11, 2002 (Japan)
- Running time: 98 minutes
- Countries: Germany; Japan; United States
- Language: English
- Budget: $70 million
- Box office: $25.9 million

Rollerball is a 2002 science fiction sports film directed by John McTiernan. A remake of the 1975 film of the same name, which itself based on William Harrison's short story Roller Ball Murder. The film stars Chris Klein, Jean Reno, LL Cool J, Rebecca Romijn, and Naveen Andrews. While both versions of Rollerball use the same basic premise, the 2002 version has a much greater focus on action sequences, more muted social and political overtones than the original, and takes place in the mid-2000s rather than in a future dystopian 2010s.

When Rollerball was released on February 8, 2002, the film received negative critics and was a box-office bomb, grossing $25.9 million against a production budget of $70 million. In 2014, the Los Angeles Times listed it as one of the most expensive box office flops of all time.

== Plot ==
In 2005, the new sport of Rollerball, a violent extension of roller derby involving motorcycles and a metal ball, becomes popular in many countries. Marcus Ridley invites the talented sports fanatic Jonathan Cross to join him playing for the Zhambel Horsemen in Kazakhstan. Jonathan refuses, hoping to try out for the NHL in some months. However, after he recklessly skates through his hometown, the police start looking for Jonathan, who is forced to accept Marcus' offer to escape them. The highly paid Marcus and Jonathan are teamed with low-paid locals, who are often severely injured in the game.

In the beginning, Jonathan, the team's star player and the poster child of promoter Alexi Petrovich, is enamored by the high-octane sport, the popularity, sports cars and his female teammate Aurora. The two keep their relationship a secret. During one game, one of their teammates is targeted by the opposing team and severely injured by an opponent. However, the team quickly discovers that that the attack might have been planned before the game, as one of the straps of the victim's helmet had been cut and the cameras filming the event seemed ready for the incident to happen. Jonathan and Ridley eventually discover that Alexi and his assistant, Sanjay, have a vested interest in keeping the game as popular as possible, through planned gory "accidents" and ensuring that Jonathan and Ridley cannot quit the team and remain high-profile stars. Both the deaths and Jonathan's talent seem to generate upticks in ratings.

Jonathan and Ridley pretend to know nothing about this situation, wanting to keep their current lifestyle but after an "accident" almost kills Aurora, the two friends decide that they need to flee the country to save their lives. Their teammates, including Aurora, cannot join them, though, as they have families there. Jonathan and Marcus are followed by Alexi and several bodyguards, who attack the two before they can reach the Russian border. Jonathan is injured and Ridley has to leave him behind. Alexi and his men capture Jonathan and kill Ridley before the latter can cross the border.

Jonathan says that he will keep working for Alexi if Aurora is traded to another team, wanting to keep her away from danger. Alexi complies, secretly transferring Aurora to the opposing team for the next match. Knowing he cannot trust Jonathan anymore, Alexi tries to stage a public execution of him by removing all the rules from the upcoming Rollerball match. The match becomes more violent than ever before, and many players die. However, Jonathan, with the help of players from both teams, starts a revolution, causing the fans to see the sport for what it really is. In a fit of rage, he kills Alexi and Sanjay before reuniting with Aurora.

== Cast ==
- Chris Klein as Jonathan Cross
- Jean Reno as Alexi Petrovich
- LL Cool J as Marcus Ridley
- Rebecca Romijn-Stamos as Aurora "The Black Widow"
- Naveen Andrews as Sanjay
- Oleg Taktarov as Oleg "Denny" Denekin
- David Hemblen as Serokin
- Paul Heyman as Sports Announcer
- Janet Wright as Coach Olga
- Andrew Bryniarski as Halloran
- Mike Dopud as Michael "The Assassin" Uglich
- Kata Dobó as Katya Dobolakova
- Lucia Rijker as Lucia Ryjker
- Toshihiro Ito as Japanese Announcer

The film features cameo appearances by Pink, Slipknot and Shane McMahon.

== Production ==
The movie was filmed in about 15 weeks, between July 24 and November 2000. The original script, which focused on fleshing out the social commentary of the original 1975 film, was completely re-written several times on the orders of director John McTiernan so that it focused more on WWE-like showmanship, including crazy costumes and stunts, while changing the film's storyline from a modern-day success story to a classic underdog story. Initial screenings of a two-hour workprint cut in Las Vegas around April–May 2001 received a very negative response from test audiences. MGM pushed the release date back from May to July 13 to test the movie again, hoping that they would find the right audience for it.

Harry Knowles from Ain't it Cool News was invited by McTiernan for a test screening of the film in Long Island sometime after the first test screening, and in his review of McTiernan's original cut, Knowles said that the movie was bad but was at least an unapologetic hard-R film with much nudity and some brutal violence in Rollerball scenes but even as a workprint, it was obvious how poorly the action scenes were edited, and the story was bad. "The Rollerball edit I saw was one of the worst films I'd seen in my life. There was jeering in the theater," Knowles said. Knowles was also one of the people who read the original first draft of the script (the one that McTiernan rejected) and he said that it was an amazing script which solved all the problems of the original film.

Following the negative test screenings, MGM ordered massive re-shoots and re-edits to be done on the film in the middle of 2001. Shortly after the test screenings, MGM appointed a new head of marketing and distribution, Robert Levin, who convinced McTiernan to let go of the summer release date. This would give the studio more time to devise a better marketing strategy and allow McTiernan to do re-shoots and to re-edit the film for a PG-13 rating, in an attempt by the studio to get a wider audience to see the film. The release date was then pushed back again from August all the way to February 2002, due to all the post production work causing delays. McTiernan shot two weeks of additional footage in late 2001 to clarify certain scenes, especially the film's ending and also cut down the violence and all the nudity.

On orders from the studio, around 30 minutes were cut out of the original rough cut of the film and the entire ending was re-shot and changed. Some of the cuts were made because MGM thought the movie was "too Asian". In the original ending, Alexi Petrovich (Jean Reno) gets killed by Sanjay (Naveen Andrews) and Jonathan Cross (Chris Klein) and Aurora (Rebecca Romijn-Stamos) fly back to the US, during which Jonathan says that he will continue playing Rollerball there and is now part owner of the game.

Some of the scenes that were cut for the PG-13 rating but were never put back even in later DVD and Blu-ray so-called R rated versions of the film, include lots more blood in all the Rollerball scenes and parts like skulls getting smashed, bones getting broken, teeth flying out, a scene where Aurora is topless and walks towards Jonathan in the locker room originally didn't have a shadow over her (this was added in post production to cover her up for the PG-13 rating), their sex scene was also longer and so was their conversation while they are lying down in a sauna. Some of the other similar edits that were done on more graphic scenes in the film include digitally replacing blood spurts with sweat. Some of the action scenes were also longer in the original cut and/or edited differently or re-shot, such as the opening scene in San Francisco which was partially re-shot after the original version of it was considered to be too confusing due to the editing.

The original score by Brian Transeau was also removed, purportedly because it sounded "too Arabic", and was replaced with a new score by Éric Serra. Also, some of the other music was changed or removed from the first cut of the film. For marketing and greater appeal, the WWE, then WWF, had the actors Klein, Romijn-Stamos and LL Cool J appear in the January 31, 2002 episode of WWF SmackDown. The trio drank beers and played cards with wrestling superstars Faarooq and Bradshaw of Acolytes Protection Agency. In another segment, the trio followed APA to the ring to watch the match and celebrate after APA wins.

== Reception ==
=== Box office ===
Rollerball opened at number three at the box office below Collateral Damage and Big Fat Liar, collecting $9 million during its opening weekend.

=== Critical response ===
On the review aggregator website Rotten Tomatoes, 3% of 118 critics' reviews are positive, with an average rating of 2.8/10. The website's consensus reads: "Removing the social critique of the original, this updated version of Rollerball is violent, confusing, and choppy. Klein makes for a bland hero." Metacritic, which uses a weighted average, assigned the film a score of 14 out of 100, based on 28 critics, indicating "overwhelming dislike". Audiences surveyed by CinemaScore gave the film a grade B− on scale of A to F.

Time Out's Trevor Johnson described it as "a checklist shaped by a 15-year-old mallrat: thrashing metal track, skateboards, motorbikes, cracked heads and Rebecca Romijn with her top off". Chicago Sun-Times reviewer Roger Ebert called it "an incoherent mess, a jumble of footage in search of plot, meaning, rhythm and sense". Chris Klein, the lead actor, was also a subject of criticism, with Ebert saying Klein seemed like a "nice kid" and was not convincing in what aspired to be a hard-edged violent film. Sean P. Means of The Salt Lake Tribune gave the film a 1 out of 4 rating, explaining that "McTiernan tries to bury the idiocy of his high-tech Gladiator under flashy editing and unexplained rock-star cameos". David Germain of The Associated Press wrote, "Loud, crude and outlandish, Rollerball is a parody of itself, a frenzy of extreme-sports stunts masquerading as social commentary on violence and the corporate forces that feed off it".

Elvis Mitchell of The New York Times gave it a 1 out of 5 scoring, stating that "McTiernan's remake may be lighter on its feet -- the sober-minded original was as graceful as a tap-dancing rhino -- but it is just as boring and as obvious". In a 1.5 out of 5 review, Kevin Thomas of Los Angeles Times said, "It's too bad this Rollerball veered off-track so swiftly, derailed by bad writing and possibly also by some of that extensive post-production reworking to aim the film at young males in the throes of their first full flush of testosterone".

=== Accolades ===
Rebecca Romijn-Stamos was nominated for the Golden Raspberry Award for Worst Supporting Actress, where she lost to Madonna for her cameo in Die Another Day at the 23rd Golden Raspberry Awards. At the 2002 Stinkers Bad Movie Awards, the film won awards for Worst Director (McTiernan), Worst Remake and Worst Female Fake Accent (Romijn-Stamos). Romijn-Stamos was also nominated for Worst Actress but lost to Madonna for Swept Away.

The author of source short story "Roller Ball Murder" and writer of the original film's screenplay, science fiction author William Harrison, said, "I've never watched the 2002 incarnation of Rollerball, and have no interest in it."

== Controversy ==
In 2013, director John McTiernan was sentenced to a year in federal prison for making false statements to an FBI investigator in February 2006 over hiring infamous Hollywood fixer Anthony Pellicano to wiretap Charles Roven, the producer of the film, around August 2000. McTiernan had been in a disagreement with Roven about what type of film Rollerball should be and hired Pellicano to investigate Roven's intentions and actions. He had asked Pellicano to try to find instances where Roven made negative remarks about the studio executives or said things to others that were inconsistent with what he said to the studio.

== Soundtrack ==
The score was released, but the soundtrack was not.

1. "Boom" – P.O.D.
2. "Told You So" – Drowning Pool
3. "Ride" – Beautiful Creatures
4. "Millionaire" – Rappagariya
5. "I Am Hated" – Slipknot
6. "Body Go" – Hardknox
7. "Feel So Numb" – Rob Zombie
8. "Keep Away" – Godsmack
9. "Insane in the Brain" – Sen Dog
10. "Flashpoint" – Fear Factory
11. "When I Come Around" – Green Day
12. "Crawling in the Dark" – Hoobastank
13. "Time to Play" – Pillar
14. "Never Gonna Stop (The Red Red Kroovy)" – Rob Zombie
