= Rie Rasmussen =

Danish actress, filmmaker, photographer and former model

- Born: 14 February 1978 (age 48); Copenhagen, Denmark
- Occupations: Actress; director; writer; photographer; model
- Children: 1
- Modeling information
- Height: 1.78 m (5 ft 10 in)
- Hair color: Brown (natural); Blonde (dyed)
- Eye color: Blue
- Agency: Next Model Management (Milan, London, Los Angeles, Miami); Dominique Models (Brussels)

Rie Rasmussen (/riː/ REE; born 14 February 1978) (Note: Rasmussen has given her date of birth as 14 February. Her year of birth has been alternately reported as 1978 or 1982.) is a Danish actress, director, writer, photographer and former model. She is best known for her acting roles in the films Femme Fatale (2002) and Angel-A (2005).

== Early life and education ==
Rasmussen grew up in an extended Danish family with eight brothers and sisters. She was discovered by a modelling scout at the age of 15, while on a family holiday in New York, and moved to New York from Denmark shortly after. Her initial dream was to be an animator for Disney films.

She later moved to California, United States where she attended the Hollywood Film Institute film school as a writer-director. Whilst attending, Rasmussen was an acquaintance of American filmmakers Owen Wilson and Wes Anderson.

== Film career ==
Her film industry breakthrough came in 2001, when she was recommended by her friend, American actress Rebecca Romijn, for the role of model Veronica in the erotic thriller Femme Fatale. Rasmussen was given the role after director Brian De Palma was impressed by short stories she had written about her life experiences. He praised Rasmussen's walk as an "amazing piece of movement."

After Femme Fatale, Rasmussen approached French director Luc Besson with a film she wanted to have produced. After initially rejecting the idea, Besson eventually produced Rasmussen's first short film Thinning the Herd, which screened in competition at the 2004 Festival de Cannes for the Palme d'Or du court métrage. Thinning the Herd was an official selection of more than 20 film festivals around the world, including the Quentin Tarantino Film Festival in Austin. In the same year, she wrote and directed her second short film, Il Vestito, which was presented at the Taormina Film Festival.

A year later, she was cast in Besson's Angel-A in the title role, her first leading role in a feature film. She plays an angel who saves a suicidal Parisian. Although Rasmussen plays Frenchwomen in her two major acting roles (Femme Fatale and Angel-A), she did not speak French. Feeling the pressure of acting in a foreign language, she spent 3½ months learning French for the film. Many French viewers were surprised to discover Rasmussen hadn't been speaking the language for years. However, Rasmussen's limited fluency affected her ability to improvise with co-star Jamel Debbouze.

In 2009, she wrote, directed, produced and starred in her first feature film, Human Zoo. It is loosely based on the story of her adopted Vietnamese sister struggling to acquire citizenship. Set against the backdrop of the conflict in Kosovo, Rasmussen plays a Balkan refugee illegally living in Marseille. The film highlights the problems with immigration and learned aggression, and unfolds in a non-linear storytelling structure with scenes of extreme violence. Rasmussen filmed with French cinematographer Thierry Arbogast, who shot Femme Fatale and Angel-A.

Human Zoo was officially selected at the 2009 Berlin International Film Festival, opening the Panorama section, and was hand picked by Quentin Tarantino to have its US premiere at Los Angeles' New Beverly Cinema.

== Fashion ==
Rasmussen's role in Femme Fatale attracted attention to her in fashion circles, and she was chosen as the face of Gucci under director Tom Ford. Her fashion debut was modelling for Victoria's Secret in 2001. She has worked with fashion houses including Donna Karan, Yves Saint Laurent, Dolce & Gabbana and Fendi.

Rasmussen credits her modeling experience as a valuable asset in her career as a fashion photographer. She has described her approach to modelling as portrayal of a character, saying it is very much like acting. While working as a model she continued to write scripts and short stories, and directed smaller surf-skate videos.

== Art ==
Rasmussen is a visual artist and photographer. Her oil on canvas pieces are erotic celebrations of the human form. Her book of art and photography, Grafiske Historier (Graphic Tales) was published in 2006 under the pseudonym Lilly Dillon (a character from the novel The Grifters by Jim Thompson, one of her favorite American writers). Most of her work published in Grafiske Historier is from her time working as a model.

As a photographer, her images have been published in magazines including Vogue Italia, Vogue Paris, and Vs. She has named photographers Guy Bourdin, Richard Avedon, Peter Lindbergh, Steven Klein, Steven Meisel and Robert Mapplethorpe as influences.

== Personal life ==
Rasmussen is bisexual.

In 2010, she publicly accused fashion photographer Terry Richardson of exploiting young models.

== Filmography ==
Year	Title	Role	Notes	Ref.
1994	Ready to Wear (Prêt-à-Porter)	As herself	Filmed on location at Paris Fashion Week	
2002	Femme Fatale	Veronica Laurent	First acting role	
2003	Nobody Needs to Know	—N/a	Associate producer	
2004	Thinning the Herd	Lucy Fuir	Anthology film short segment; writer, director	
2004	Il Vestito		Short film; writer, director	
2005	Angel-A	Angel-A	First leading role in a feature	
2009	Romance the Dark		Writer, director	
2009	Human Zoo	Adria Shala	Writer, director	
2013	1%ERS	Tatiana	Short film	

== Music videos ==
Year	Artist	Song
2012	Chester French	Black Girls
