= Human Zoo (film) =

- French film poster
- Directed by: Rie Rasmussen
- Written by: Rie Rasmussen
- Produced by: Rie Rasmussen
- Starring: Rie Rasmussen; Nikola Đuričko; Nick Corey
- Cinematography: Thierry Arbogast
- Edited by: Rie Rasmussen
- Music by: Illinav Illim
- Production companies: EuropaCorp; Canal+ S.A.
- Distributed by: EuropaCorp
- Release date: 5 February 2009 (BIFF)
- Running time: 110 minutes
- Country: France
- Languages: English; Serbian; French; Albanian

Human Zoo is a 2009 French crime drama film directed, produced, written by and starring Rie Rasmussen.

== Cast ==
- Rie Rasmussen as Adria Shala
- Nikola Đuričko as Srdjan Vasiljevic
- Nick Corey as Shawn Reagan
- Vojin Ćetković as Alex
- Miloš Timotijević as Boris
- Hiam Abbass as Mina
- Saïd Amadis as Mohamed
- Branislav Lečić as Commander Stojkovic

== Production ==
The film is partially based on the experiences of Rie Rasmussen's adopted sister, a Vietmanese immigrant to Denmark. In an interview with Ain't It Cool News, Rasmussen said about the film's sex scenes, "I wanted to see it for real, and I wanted it to be from a female's point of view. Yeah, he is going down on her. It's in one take. There's no fu*king cutting in and out and making it all romantic and rosey and shit. This is one take, and that's how it is. It's clumsy, it's sexy, it's hardcore, and he is going down on her."

== Reception ==
Leslie Felperin of Variety described the film as "an incoherent, mostly poorly acted muddle that doesn't even look very good." Quentin Tarantino spoke favorably of Human Zoo, calling it "an electrifying directorial debut."
