= Angel-A =

- French theatrical release poster
- Directed by: Luc Besson
- Written by: Luc Besson
- Produced by: Luc Besson
- Starring: Jamel Debbouze; Rie Rasmussen; Gilbert Melki; Serge Riaboukine
- Cinematography: Thierry Arbogast
- Edited by: Frédéric Thoraval
- Music by: Anja Garbarek
- Production companies: EuropaCorp; TF1 Films Production; Apipoulaï
- Distributed by: EuropaCorp Distribution (France); Sony Pictures Classics (United States)
- Release date: 21 December 2005 (France)
- Running time: 90 minutes
- Country: France
- Languages: French; Spanish
- Budget: $1.2 million
- Box office: $9.99 million

Angel-A is a 2005 French romantic fantasy comedy-drama film written and directed by Luc Besson. The film stars Jamel Debbouze as André, a small-time con artist drowning in debt and contemplating suicide, and Rie Rasmussen as Angela, a mysterious woman who saves him and helps him resolve his crises. Shot in stark black-and-white cinematography by Thierry Arbogast and set against the iconic backdrop of Paris, the film explores themes of redemption, self-worth, and supernatural intervention.

Besson returned to directing after a six-year hiatus with this more intimate, dialogue-driven project, which he also produced under his EuropaCorp banner. The film premiered in France on December 21, 2005, and received a limited U.S. release on May 25, 2007, via Sony Pictures Classics.

Critical reception was mixed; the film holds a 47% approval rating on Rotten Tomatoes, with praise for its visual style but criticism for its dialogue and pacing. It grossed $9.99 million worldwide, including over $200,000 in the United States.

== Plot ==
André Moussah (Jamel Debbouze) is a small-time Moroccan con artist living in Paris, who has managed to secure American citizenship through a lottery. Overwhelmed by debt to multiple dangerous creditors, including the menacing Franck (Gilbert Melki), he is given until midnight to repay his debts or face death. After failing to find help at the American embassy or a local police station, a desperate André decides to commit suicide by jumping off the Pont Alexandre-III bridge into the Seine.

Just as he is about to jump, André notices a tall, beautiful woman, Angela (Rie Rasmussen), doing the same. She jumps, and André instinctively dives in after her, pulling her to safety despite having the use of only one functional arm. Grateful, Angela pledges her life to André, declaring that since he saved her, she now belongs to him and will do everything in her power to help him.

Skeptical at first, André tests Angela's offer by taking her to confront his creditors. He believes that having a beautiful woman by his side will earn him respect, but Franck is unimpressed. Angela negotiates privately with him, emerging with a large sum of cash and the news that André's debt is cleared. Reluctant to believe she did not prostitute herself, André accepts the money but is disgusted. As they need more funds, Angela offers to help again, and the pair visit a nightclub, where she lures men into the bathroom, promising sex in exchange for cash. When a distraught André confronts her, Angela assures him she merely knocked the men unconscious and took their money.

Later, after André impulsively bets all their money on a supposedly "fixed" horse race that fails, he finds himself desperate again. It is then that Angela reveals her true identity: she is an angel sent to help him. André is incredulous until she demonstrates her divine powers, such as the ability to levitate objects. As Angela continues to guide him, she helps him find the courage to see his own self-worth.

Angela then convinces André to confront Franck with honesty instead of fear. André offers a heartfelt apology and a confession of his newfound love for the woman who saved him. An emotional Angela announces that her work is done and she must return home. She sprouts wings from her back and begins to ascend into the sky, but André grabs hold of her, professing his love. They crash into the Seine for the second time. When André climbs out of the water, he is followed by Angela, who has lost her wings. She rejoices at seeing him, now able to stay on Earth.

== Cast ==
- Jamel Debbouze as André Moussah
- Rie Rasmussen as Angel-A
- Gilbert Melki as Franck
- Serge Riaboukine as Pedro
- Akim Chir as the leader of the thugs
- Eric Balliet as Franck's bodyguard
- Loïc Pora as the second thug
- Vénus Boone as Angela's mother
- Jérôme Guesdon as the third thug
- Michel Bellot as the U.S. embassy guard
- Michel Chesneau as the policeman
- Olivier Claverie as the U.S. embassy secretary
- Solange Milhaud as the woman from Saint-Lazare
- Laurent Jumeaucourt as the flirtatious man
- Franck-Olivier Bonnet as the last client

== Production ==
=== Development and writing ===
Luc Besson first conceived the story for Angel-A approximately a decade before its release, around 1997, but he set it aside because he felt too young and inexperienced to develop the characters' dialogue properly. He returned to the project in 2005 and completed the screenplay in just three weeks. The script was deeply personal, drawing inspiration from a moment in Besson's own life when a girlfriend forced him to confront his insecurities by making him look at himself in a mirror and affirm his own worth.

Besson positioned Angel-A as an intimate, low-budget project to reclaim creative autonomy after big-budget efforts like The Fifth Element (1997). For the lead role of André, Besson stated there was only one choice for a French-language production: the popular comedian Jamel Debbouze. For the enigmatic Angela, he chose the Danish model and aspiring actress Rie Rasmussen, drawn to her striking, statuesque presence, which provided a strong visual contrast to Debbouze. Rasmussen learned French in approximately three-and-a-half months for the role.

=== Filming ===
Principal photography took place entirely on location in Paris over nine weeks in the summer of 2005. Besson employed a guerrilla-style shoot with a minimal crew, often operating the camera himself to maintain spontaneity and keep a low profile. The crew worked very early in the morning to avoid crowds and maintain secrecy, which was crucial for shooting in high-traffic tourist areas without permits.

Cinematographer Thierry Arbogast shot the film in black-and-white, a deliberate choice by Besson to evoke a timeless, fairy-tale quality and pay homage to his debut feature Le Dernier Combat (1983).

Locations used in the film include:

- 1st arrondissement: Place du Marché-Saint-Honoré, Rue de Rivoli
- 2nd arrondissement: Le Grand Colbert restaurant
- 4th arrondissement: Pont au Double, Quai de la Rapée, Square Jean-XXIII
- 5th arrondissement: Pont de la Tournelle, Pont de Sully
- 6th arrondissement: Pont des Arts
- 7th arrondissement: Place de Fontenoy, Port Port, Avenue Barbey-d'Aurevilly, Avenue Émile-Deschanel
- 8th arrondissement: Pont Alexandre-III
- 9th arrondissement: Place Édouard-VII
- 15th arrondissement: Pont de Bir-Hakeim
- 16th arrondissement: Rue Chardin, Avenue d'Eylau, Rue de l'Alboni, Square Alboni, Voie Georges-Pompidou
- 18th arrondissement: Boulevard de Clichy, Place Saint-Pierre, Rue du Cardinal-Dubois, Square Louise-Michel

The production did not receive permission to film inside the actual United States Embassy in the 8th arrondissement, so interiors were recreated at the Éclair Studios in Épinay-sur-Seine.

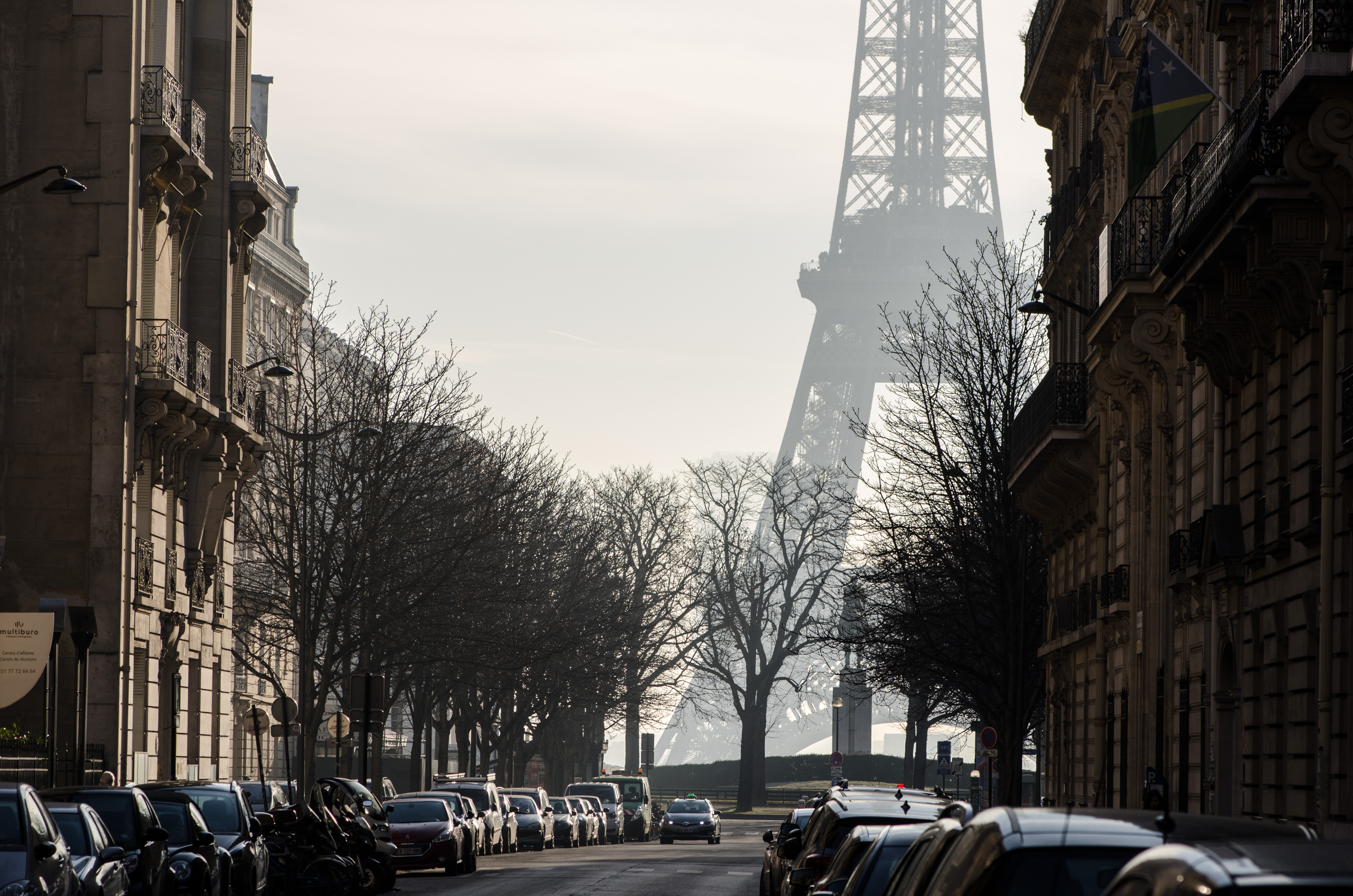
Avenue d'Eylau

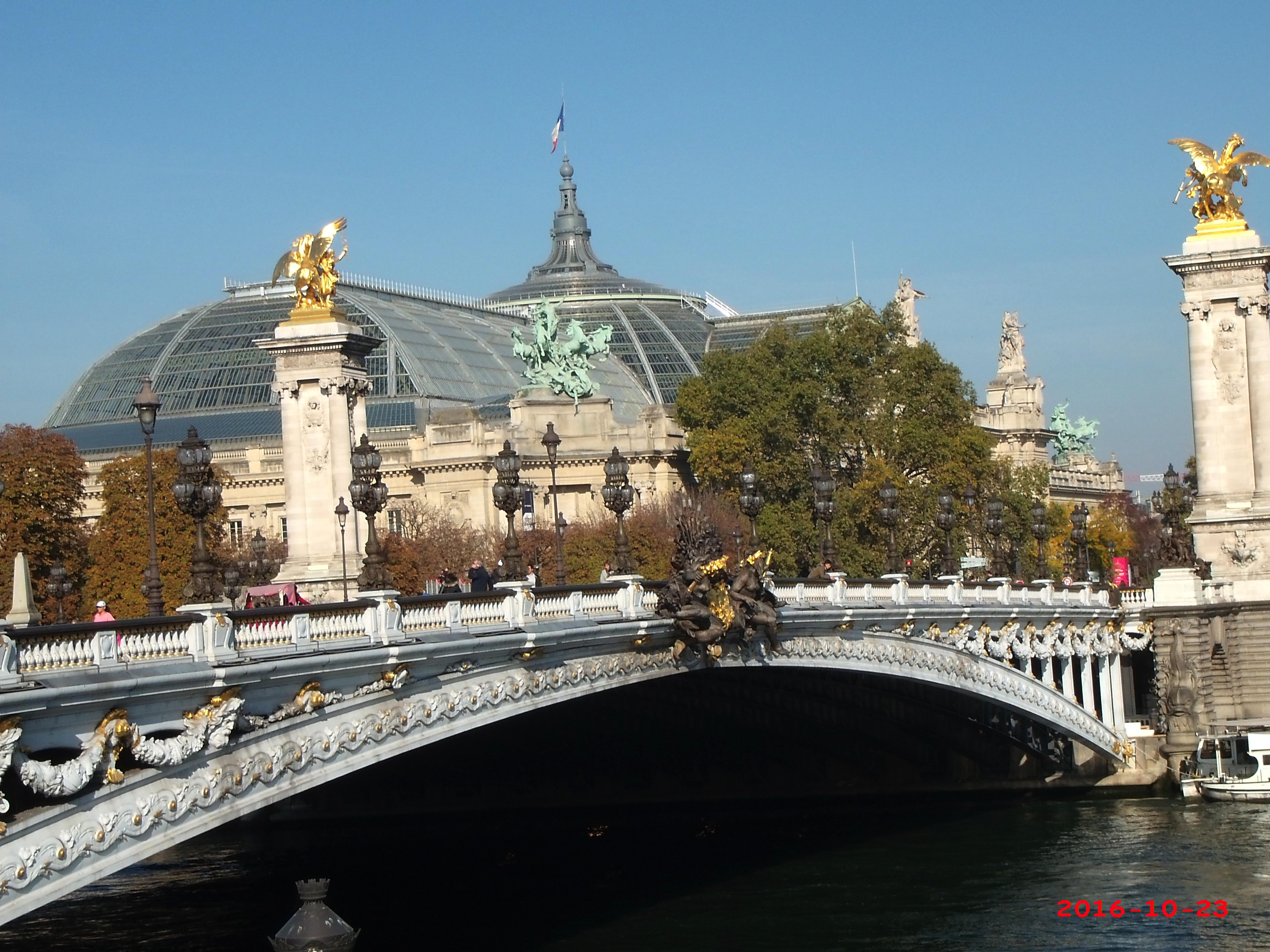
Pont Alexandre-III

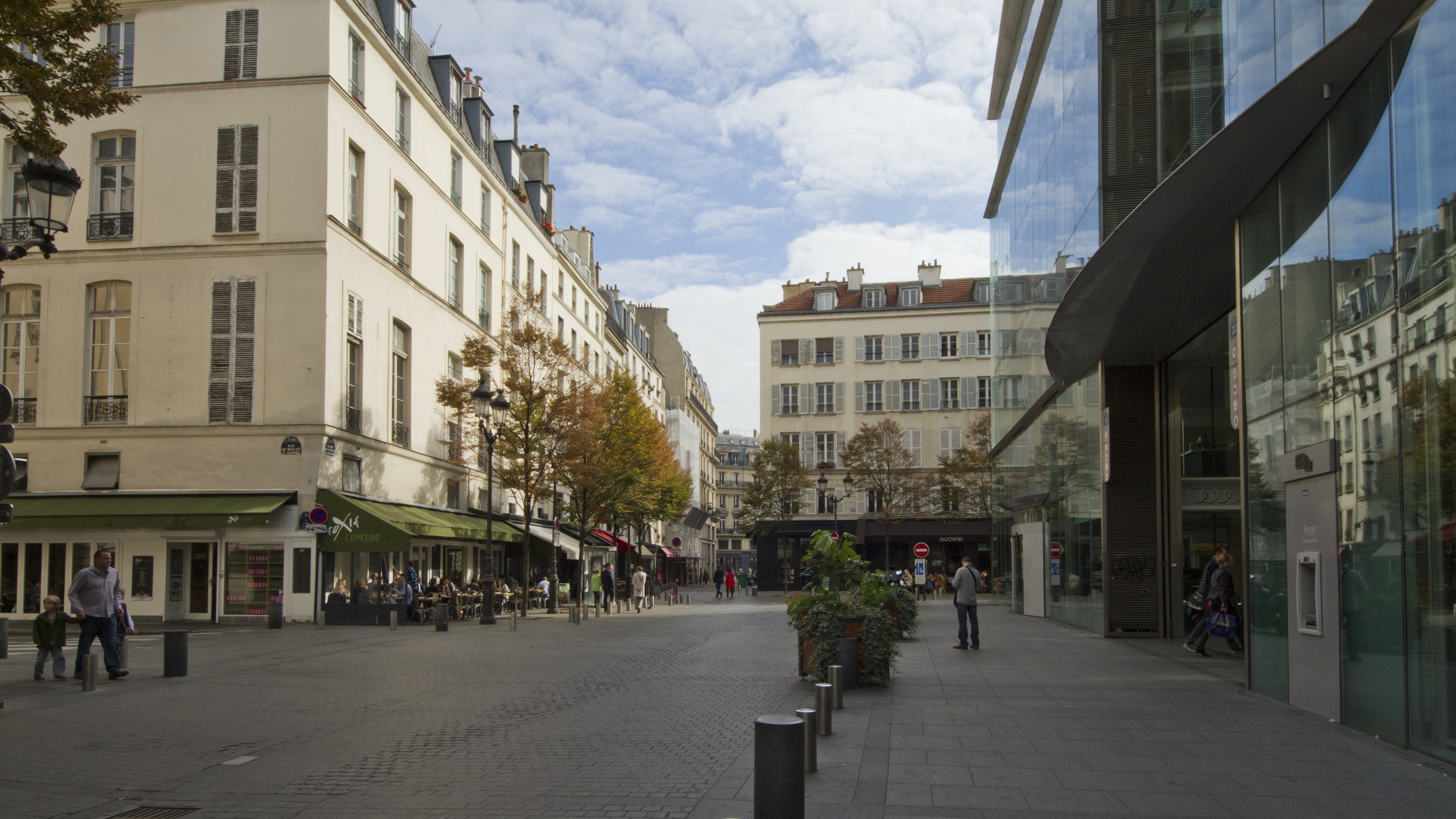
Place du Marché-Saint-Honoré

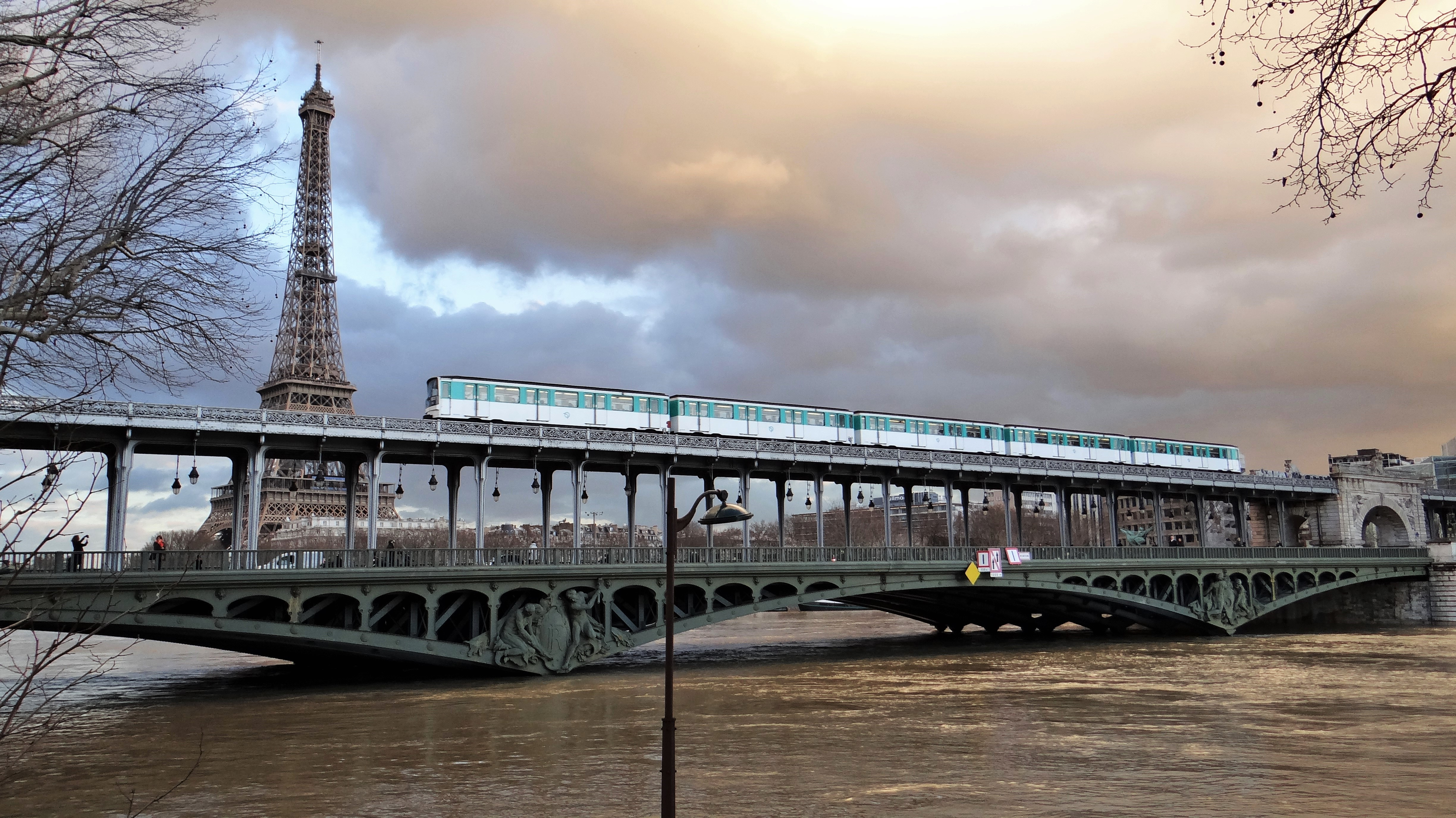
Pont de Bir-Hakeim

=== Music ===
The film's score was composed by the Norwegian artist Anja Garbarek. This marked the first time a Luc Besson-directed film did not feature a score by his frequent collaborator Éric Serra. The soundtrack, released on December 19, 2005, by Virgin Records, blends ethereal vocals with elements of ambient, indie rock, and dream pop.

Track listing:

| No. | Title | Length |
|---|---|---|
| 1. | "Beyond My Control" |
| 2. | "Can I Keep Him?" |
| 3. | "It's Just a Game" |
| 4. | "Thank You Franck" |
| 5. | "Her Room" |
| 6. | "André Running" |
| 7. | "No Trace of Grey" |
| 8. | "The Cabinet" |
| 9. | "A. on Bridge" |
| 10. | "Spin the Context" |
| 11. | "It's Just a Game…" |
| 12. | "Le corridor" |
| 13. | "Balloon Mood" |
| 14. | "André face au miroir" |
| 15. | "Crossroads" |
| 16. | "Captivante" |
| 17. | "Under Your Wings" |
| 18. | "Angel" |

== Release ==
Angel-A was released in France by EuropaCorp Distribution on December 21, 2005, on approximately 900 screens. It premiered in the United States at the 2007 Sundance Film Festival and was given a limited theatrical release by Sony Pictures Classics on May 25, 2007. The film was released on DVD in France on July 5, 2006, by StudioCanal.

=== Box office ===
The film grossed a total of $9,995,168 worldwide. In its native France, it was a modest success, selling 800,165 tickets during its theatrical run. In the United States, it earned $202,647 from a limited release that expanded to a maximum of 18 theaters.

=== Critical response ===
Critical reception was mixed. The film holds a 47% approval rating on Rotten Tomatoes, based on 86 reviews, with an average rating of 5.5/10. The site's consensus reads: "The clunky dialogue and shallow characters fail to capitalize upon Angel-A's stunning, poetic cinematography." On Metacritic, the film has a weighted average score of 48 out of 100 based on 25 critic reviews, indicating "mixed or average reviews".

Many critics praised the film's visual beauty, particularly Thierry Arbogast's black-and-white cinematography, which was described as "ravishingly lensed" and giving the film a "whimsical storybook-noir atmosphere." The chemistry between the mismatched leads was also highlighted as a strength. However, the film was widely criticized for its dialogue, which was deemed clunky, clichéd, and overly expository, and for its uneven pacing.

French critical reception was similarly divided. AlloCiné gave the film an average rating of 2.8/5 based on 19 reviews. Positive reviews, such as those in Le Figaroscope and Le Parisien, praised the film's classic, sober style, its superb use of Paris, and the charming performance of Jamel Debbouze. More critical reviews, including those from Les Cahiers du cinéma and Libération, found the film's scenario lazy and its dialogue weak, with Libération calling it "simply a stupid film."

== See also ==
- List of films about angels
- List of black-and-white films produced since 1966
