= Thierry Arbogast =

French cinematographer

- Born: 24 January 1956 (age 70); Paris, France
- Years active: 1976–present

Thierry Arbogast (born 24 January 1956) is a French cinematographer, best known for his collaboration with director Luc Besson from 1990 to 2019.

== Filmography ==
=== Film ===
Year	Title	Director
1978	Flammes	Adolfo Arrieta
1982	Les jocondes	Jean-Daniel Pillault
1983	Rock and Torah	Marc-André Grynbaum
1986	Gardien de la nuit	Jean-Pierre Limosin
1987	Le beauf	Yves Amoureux
1988	Eden miseria	Christine Laurent
1990	Nikita	Luc Besson
1991	Le Brasier	Éric Barbier
1991	Génial, mes parents divorcent!	Patrick Braoudé
1991	Oostende	Eric Woreth
1991	I Don't Kiss	André Téchiné
1992	La Fille de l'air	Maroun Bagdadi
1993	My Favorite Season	André Téchiné
1993	Lost in Transit	Philippe Lioret
1994	Léon: The Professional	Luc Besson
1995	The Horseman on the Roof	Jean-Paul Rappeneau
1996	Ridicule	Patrice Leconte
1996	The Apartment	Gilles Mimouni
1997	The Fifth Element	Luc Besson
1997	She's So Lovely	Nick Cassavetes
1998	Black Cat, White Cat	Emir Kusturica
1999	Wing Commander	Chris Roberts
1999	The Messenger: The Story of Joan of Arc	Luc Besson
2000	Toreros	Eric Barbier
2000	The Dancer	Frédéric Garson
2000	Woman on Top	Fina Torres
2000	The Crimson Rivers	Mathieu Kassovitz
2001	Kiss of the Dragon	Chris Nahon
2002	Femme Fatale	Brian De Palma
2003	Bon Voyage	Jean-Paul Rappeneau
2004	Swindled	Miguel Bardem
2004	Catwoman	Pitof
2005	Angel-A	Luc Besson
2006	Bandidas	Joachim Rønning; Espen Sandberg
2006	The Secret Book	Vlado Cvetanovski
2006	Arthur and the Minimoys	Luc Besson
2008	Asterix at the Olympic Games	Frédéric Forestier; Thomas Langmann
2008	Babylon A.D.	Mathieu Kassovitz
2009	Human Zoo	Rie Rasmussen
2009	Le missionnaire	Roger Delattre
2009	Happy End	Arnaud Larrieu; Jean-Marie Larrieu
2009	Arthur and the Revenge of Maltazard	Luc Besson
2010	Heartbreaker	Pascal Chaumeil
2010	The Extraordinary Adventures of Adèle Blanc-Sec	Luc Besson
2010	Arthur 3: The War of the Two Worlds	Luc Besson
2011	The Lady	Luc Besson
2011	Inseparable	Dayyan Eng
2012	Another Woman's Life	Sylvie Testud
2012	The Patience Stone	Atiq Rahimi
2013	The Family	Luc Besson
2014	3 Days to Kill	McG
2014	Lucy	Luc Besson
2015	Belles familles	Jean-Paul Rappeneau
2015	Lolo	Julie Delpy
2015	Shanghai Belleville	Show-Chun Lee
2016	Lost in White	Wei Xu
2017	Wished	Dayyan Eng
2017	Valerian and the City of a Thousand Planets	Luc Besson
2018	Love Addict	Frank Bellocq
2019	Cold Blood Legacy	Frédéric Petitjean
2019	Anna	Luc Besson
2019	A Magical Journey	Olias Barco
2019	Our Lady of the Nile	Atiq Rahimi
2021	Déflagrations	Vanya Peirani-Vignes
2021	The Last Mercenary	David Charhon
2021	Al Kameen	Pierre Morel
2023	Zodi et Téhu, frères du désert	Eric Barbier
2023	Freelance	Pierre Morel
2024	Canary Black	Pierre Morel
2025	The Gardener	David Charhon
2025	Sur la route de papa	Nabil Aitakkaouali; Olivier Dacourt
2026	Broken Truth	Caroline Fourest

Documentary film

Year	Title	Director	Note
1988	A Tale of the Wind	Joris Ivens	With Jacques Loiseleux

=== Television ===
Year	Title	Director	Note
1994	3000 scénarios contre un virus	Philippe Lioret	Episode "La sirène"

== Awards and nominations ==
Year	Award	Category	Title	Result
1990	César Awards	Best Cinematography	Nikita	Nominated
1994	César Awards	Best Cinematography	Léon: The Professional	Nominated
1995	César Awards	Best Cinematography	The Horseman on the Roof	Won
1996	César Awards	Best Cinematography	Ridicule	Nominated
1997	César Awards	Best Cinematography	The Fifth Element	Won
1999	César Awards	Best Cinematography	The Messenger: The Story of Joan of Arc	Nominated
2000	César Awards	Best Cinematography	The Crimson Rivers	Nominated
2003	César Awards	Best Cinematography	Bon Voyage	Won
1997	Vulcan Award	Technical Grand Prize	The Fifth Element	Won
1997	Vulcan Award	Technical Grand Prize	She's So Lovely	Won
1997	Camerimage	Golden Frog	She's So Lovely	Nominated
1998	European Film Awards	Best Cinematographer	Black Cat, White Cat	Nominated
2017	Los Angeles Film Award	Best Cinematography	Wished	Won
