= Half Past Dead =

2002 American action movie by Don Michael Paul

- Theatrical release poster
- Directed by: Don Michael Paul
- Written by: Don Michael Paul
- Produced by: Elie Samaha; Steven Seagal; Andrew Stevens
- Starring: Steven Seagal; Morris Chestnut; Ja Rule; Nia Peeples; Tony Plana; Kurupt
- Cinematography: Michael Slovis
- Edited by: Vanick Moradian
- Music by: Tyler Bates
- Production company: Franchise Pictures
- Distributed by: Screen Gems (through Sony Pictures Releasing)
- Release date: November 15, 2002
- Running time: 98 minutes
- Countries: United States; Germany
- Language: English
- Budget: $25 million
- Box office: $19.2 million

Half Past Dead is a 2002 American action film written and directed by Don Michael Paul in his directorial debut. It was produced by Elie Samaha, Andrew Stevens, and Steven Seagal, who also starred in the lead role. The film co-stars Morris Chestnut, Ja Rule, Tony Plana, Kurupt, and Nia Peeples.

It tells the story of a criminal who infiltrates a prison to interrogate a prisoner about the location of a fortune in gold while an undercover FBI agent has to stop him.

Distribution and copyrights were held by Columbia Pictures. Half Past Dead was released in the United States on November 15, 2002, by Screen Gems. The film was panned by critics, and only grossed $19 million worldwide against its $25 million production budget. Half Past Dead was Steven Seagal's last widely released film before he shifted to several direct-to-video films in many years until 2010.

== Plot ==
In San Francisco, FBI agent Sasha Petrosevitch goes undercover as a Russian car thief and is brought in by criminal Nick Frazier to work for crime boss Sonny Eckvall, who apparently shot and killed Sasha's wife. After some time, FBI Special Agent Ellen Williams and her team show up to nail Nick, but things go wrong, and Sasha gets shot.

After eight months of recovery following his brief bout of being clinically dead from the shooting, Sasha is incarcerated along with Nick in the newly reopened Alcatraz prison. Run by the charismatic warden, Juan Ruiz "El Fuego" Escarzaga, the place is known for its new state of the art death chamber where the condemned can choose from five different ways to die: lethal injection, gas chamber, hanging, firing squad, or electric chair.

Lester McKenna is the first death row prisoner brought to the new Alcatraz and also the first prisoner scheduled to be executed. An older man, he stole $200,000,000 worth of gold bricks in a heist that resulted in five deaths and hid the loot at an unknown location that has seen an unsuccessful search for 17 years. Federal Bureau of Prisons head Frank Hubbard and Supreme Court Justice Jane McPherson have arrived to witness the execution, which is a result of Jane sentencing Lester.

But she's not the only one interested in Lester. A small but well-equipped team of terrorists who call themselves the "49ers" have parachuted onto the Alcatraz island and gained control of it. Led by 49er One, a.k.a. Hubbard's assistant Donny Johnson, and 49er Six, the team finds Lester, and they want him to give up the location of his hidden stash of gold. When Lester will not tell them, Donny shoots a nearby priest and threatens to kill others if the information is not delivered.

Donny's plan is disrupted, however, when Sasha decides to step in and fight back. With the 49ers having strapped Jane to the electric chair and threaten to kill her, while Ellen and her team prepare a rescue plan from the mainland, Sasha extracts Lester and plans to use him later in a prisoner exchange with Jane. After Nick helps Sasha get away from Donny, Sasha reveals his true identity along with the fact he used Nick to get to Sonny Eckvall, on whom he seeks revenge on for the death of his wife.

With the help of Nick and some of the other inmates such as Twitch and Little Joe, Sasha sets out to rescue Jane and bring Donny down, before Alcatraz becomes everyone's final resting place. The conflict culminates in the 49ers taking Jane and Lester on a helicopter and departing with Sasha in pursuit. Donny attempts to buy time by throwing Jane out of the helicopter, but Sacha dives after her and manages to save her using a parachute. Lester reveals that he was previously given an improvised bomb vest of grenades that he sets off, killing himself and Donny. Sasha subsequently leads the investigators to the gold, as Lester told him the location before his death.

A month later, Nick, having previously learnt of Sasha's reasons for hunting Sonny, is still recovering in prison, but is informed in a meeting with Sasha that he is being released early for his role in the hostage crisis.

== Cast ==
- Steven Seagal as FBI Agent Sasha Petrosevitch
- Morris Chestnut as Donny Johnson "49er One"
- Ja Rule as Nick Frazier
- Nia Peeples as "49er Six"
- Tony Plana as Warden Juan Ruiz "El Fuego" Escarzaga
- Kurupt as Bernard "Twitch"
- Michael "Bear" Taliferro as Joe "Little Joe"
- Claudia Christian as FBI Special Agent Ellen Williams
- Linda Thorson as Judge Jane McPherson
- Bruce Weitz as Lester McKenna
- Michael McGrady as Guard Damon J. Kestner
- Richard Bremmer as Sonny Eckvall
- Hannes Jaenicke as FBI Agent Hartmann
- Mo'Nique as Twitch's Girl
- Stephen J. Cannell as Frank Hubbard
- Matt Battaglia as "49er Three"
- Wiliam T. Bowers as Alcatraz Guard

== Production ==
The film was at one stage known as Lockdown and was shot in Germany.

== Release ==
=== Home media ===
The film was released on DVD in the US on March 4, 2003.

== Reception ==
=== Box office ===
Half Past Dead was released on November 15, 2002, in the United States, where it grossed $7.8 million on its opening weekend. It grossed $15.5 million in the US and another $3.7 million outside the US, for a total worldwide gross of $19.2 million.

=== Critical response ===
On the review aggregator website Rotten Tomatoes, 3% of 88 critics' reviews are positive, with an average rating of 3.1/10. The website's consensus reads: "Seagal is now too bulky to make a convincing action hero, and Half Past Dead is too silly and incoherent to deliver any visceral kicks." Metacritic, which uses a weighted average, assigned the film a score of 23 out of 100, based on 23 critics, indicating "generally unfavorable" reviews. Audiences polled by CinemaScore gave the film an average grade of "B" on an A+ to F scale. It was ranked number 61 in a Rotten Tomatoes editorial on the 100 worst movies of all time.

Critic Roger Ebert wrote, "Half Past Dead is like an alarm that goes off while nobody is in the room. It does its job and stops, and nobody cares."

Seagal was nominated for Worst Actor at the 2002 Stinkers Bad Movie Awards and the 23rd Golden Raspberry Awards.

== Sequel ==
Half Past Dead 2 was released direct-to-video on May 15, 2007. The film does not feature actors Steven Seagal or Ja Rule, though they appear in the film via archived footage from the first movie. The starring characters were Twitch (Kurupt) and Burke (Bill Goldberg).
