= The Adventures of Pluto Nash =

- Theatrical release poster
- Directed by: Ron Underwood
- Written by: Neil Cuthbert
- Produced by: Martin Bregman; Michael Scott Bregman; Louis A. Stroller
- Starring: Eddie Murphy; Randy Quaid; Rosario Dawson; Joe Pantoliano; Jay Mohr; Luis Guzmán; James Rebhorn; Peter Boyle; Pam Grier; John Cleese
- Cinematography: Oliver Wood
- Edited by: Alan Heim; Paul Hirsch
- Music by: John Powell
- Production companies: Castle Rock Entertainment; Village Roadshow Pictures
- Distributed by: Warner Bros. Pictures
- Release date: August 16, 2002
- Running time: 95 minutes
- Country: United States
- Language: English
- Budget: $100 million
- Box office: $7.1 million

The Adventures of Pluto Nash is a 2002 American science fiction action comedy film directed by Ron Underwood and starring Eddie Murphy (in a dual role), Randy Quaid, Rosario Dawson, Joe Pantoliano, Jay Mohr, Luis Guzmán, James Rebhorn, Peter Boyle, Pam Grier, and John Cleese. The film was produced by Castle Rock Entertainment and Village Roadshow Pictures and released in the United States on August 16, 2002 by Warner Bros. Pictures.

A critical and financial failure, the film was widely panned by moviegoers and critics alike. It is notable for being considered one of the biggest box office bombs of all time, grossing only $7.1 million on a budget of $100 million.

== Plot ==
In 2080, there is a colony on the Moon called Little America. Businessman, entrepreneur, retired smuggler, and ex-convict Pluto Nash buys a nightclub in an attempt to fulfill his long-time wish and to prevent the murder of the club's previous owner, his old friend Anthony Frankowski, by mobsters Gino and his nephew, Larry. With the help of his friend Miguel and an android named Bruno, Pluto cleans it up and turns it into a very popular nightclub.

Seven years later in 2087, a young woman named Dina Lake, the daughter of a friend of Pluto's, Nicky Sticks, is stranded on the Moon and needs to earn money for transport back to Earth. Pluto gives her a job as a server. Pluto is accosted by Mogan and Kelp, henchmen of mysterious entrepreneur and businessman Rex Crater, who wants to buy the club. When Pluto refuses, the henchmen use bombs to destroy the club. Pluto, Dina, and Bruno manage to escape.

Pluto's friend Rowland, a retired police detective who also knows Pluto's mother, Flura, learns that Rex Crater has associates linked to human cloning. While Pluto and Dina investigate further, Crater's assassins strike, but Pluto and Dina escape by hijacking a limo driven by a holographic chauffeur named James.

Their investigation further links Michael "Mike" Zoroaster Marucci to Crater. They are again attacked and chased by Crater's henchmen; they barely escape and are then rescued by Felix Laranga, a local smuggler who idolizes Pluto Nash. They infiltrate Crater's casino/hotel at Moon Beach.

Pluto finally confronts Crater, who reveals himself to be a clone of Pluto. Crater has shot both Marucci and Dr. Runa Pendankin into orbit and established his own criminal enterprise. When Mogan and Kelp arrive, Crater kills them for their incompetence. He and Pluto then fight, with Crater ultimately being thrown through a window to his death.

Sometime later, a celebration is held at the fully renovated Club Pluto, where Dina puts on a performance as a singer, with Nash as the owner once again.

== Cast ==
- Eddie Murphy as Pluto Nash, a successful businessman, a retired smuggler and ex-convict who deals in animals, clothing and drugs.
  - Murphy also portrays Rex Crater, a criminal entrepreneur and businessman operating out of Moon Beach and Pluto Nash's clone created by Marucci and the geneticist Dr. Runa Pendankin from the DNA taken from Pluto's removed appendix back when Pluto was incarcerated.
- Randy Quaid as Bruno, an old, inferior 63 Deluxe model android, Pluto's childhood friend, and smuggling partner.
- Rosario Dawson as Dina Lake, an aspiring singer from Salt Lake City and daughter of Pluto's old friend Nicky Sticks who is stranded on the moon and asks Pluto for help finding a job to earn money for a ticket back to Earth.
- Joe Pantoliano as Mogan, one of Rex Crater's henchmen.
- Jay Mohr as Anthony Frankowski / Tony Francis, a former Polish singer who owned a washed-up polka club until Pluto bought it. Francis relocated to Moon Beach.
- Luis Guzmán as Felix Laranga, a smuggler from Puerto Rico and fan of Pluto Nash who deals in animals and contraband casino chips and dice.
- James Rebhorn as Belcher, Rex Crater's personal assistant who used to work for Marucci.
- Peter Boyle as Rowland, a retired police detective with connections to the FBI and an old friend of Pluto and Flura.
- Burt Young as Gino, a mobster that nearly killed Tony Francis through battery acid ingestion.
- Miguel A. Nunez Jr. as Miguel, Pluto's assistant.
- Pam Grier as Flura Nash, the mother of Pluto Nash.
- John Cleese as James, the holographic chauffeur of the limousine that Pluto hijacks.
- Lillo Brancato as Larry, a mobster who works for Gino, his uncle.
- Victor Varnado as Kelp, one of Rex Crater's henchmen.
- Alissa Kramer and Heidi Kramer as Gina and Filomina Francis, Tony's cloned wives (he does not care which is the original).
- Illeana Douglas as Dr. Mona Zimmer, the operator of a cosmetic surgery station and an apprentice of Dr. Pendankin.
- Stu "Large" Riley as Club Pluto Bouncer, an unnamed bouncer that is loyal to Pluto.
- Serge Houde as an FBI Agent
- Terry Haig as Security Guard, who leads the arrest of Bruno for accidentally breaking a robotic slot machine.
- Cornelia Sharpe as a Tony Francis Fan
- Mark Camacho as Robot holding cell clerk who guards Bruno pending the repairs to the robotic slot machine.
- Alec Baldwin as Michael "Mike" Zoroaster Marucci (uncredited), the mobster who created Rex Crater to be his public face.

== Development ==
Neil Cuthbert's script had been in development with producer Martin Bregman since at least 1983 under the shorter title Pluto Nash. Directors Rick Rosenthal and Peter Faiman were attached to the project at different times. Various stars including Harrison Ford were rumored to have considered doing the film. Eddie Murphy became attached to the film while it was in development at Castle Rock Entertainment. The company, which had previously worked with director Ron Underwood on City Slickers, sent Underwood the script. Underwood signed on to the film after the release of his film Mighty Joe Young. Different writers were hired to revise the script over a period of several months, but Eddie Murphy "kept rejecting the scripts," according to Underwood. Murphy asked for a "straight" script, like one that would be written for Sylvester Stallone or Harrison Ford, and said that he would "bring the comedy." Underwood delivered this to Murphy but believed that the script still had "problems" and hired another writer to continue to work on it during production.

== Production ==
Ron Underwood was dissatisfied with the results of the film as he was shooting it. "I knew we didn't have the kind of wit and the fun that I would want...I felt that it was not really working fully...But it wasn't very obvious how to correct it." He praised the talents of the cast and crew and said that he enjoyed working with Eddie Murphy, but said that Murphy "wasn't feeling that funny, I don't think." The result was that Underwood was on the production for four years. A review of a version of the film (with no special effects) that was published on Ain't It Cool News in January 2001 did not help matters, as Castle Rock Entertainment became spooked and commissioned two weeks of reshoots in Los Angeles that pushed the film's budget to $100 million and caused it to miss a release date intended to be in April 2001.

== Reception ==
=== Critical response ===
The Adventures of Pluto Nash was critically panned. Rotten Tomatoes ranked the film 79th in the 100 worst 2000s decade movies list with a rating of 6% based on 84 reviews. The critical consensus states, "The Adventures of Pluto Nash is neither adventurous nor funny, and Eddie Murphy is on autopilot in this notorious box office bomb." On Metacritic, it holds a 12 out of 100 based on 12 reviews, meaning “overwhelming dislike”. Joe Leydon was one of the few critics to give it a positive review calling it "a prodigious popcorn flick that may be the most undeserving victim of critical overkill since Town and Country". Audiences polled by CinemaScore gave the film an average grade of "C−" on an A+ to F scale.

Pluto Nash was nominated for five Golden Raspberry Awards in 2003 including Worst Picture, Worst Actor (Eddie Murphy), Worst Director, Worst Screenplay, and Worst Screen Couple (Murphy and himself cloned), but failed to win any. It was later nominated for Worst 'Comedy' of Our First 25 Years at the 25th Golden Raspberry Awards in 2005, but lost to Gigli.

Eddie Murphy poked fun at himself in an interview with Barbara Walters, saying, "I know the two or three people that liked this movie." In a 2016 interview with Yahoo Movies, Murphy said Pluto Nash made him cry, saying, "Pluto Nash, that breaks me down, that breaks me all the way down". In another interview, he called Pluto Nash "might be the only shitty movie", and his son described the film as "corny".

About the movie's reception, Joe Pantoliano said: "You usually can’t tell when a movie is going to be shit, but on that one you could. And I think Ron Underwood, the director, got victimized by that, because that guy is good. But because of the material and the style in which some players came to work, we were off the mark, you know? A lot of hanky-panky going on there. So, I wasn’t surprised. I was surprised it turned out to be better than I thought it was going to be."

Director Ron Underwood expressed regret that the movie didn't have a "core piece of storytelling like the mid-life crisis" and said he thinks "the film was not very good."

=== Box office ===
The Adventures of Pluto Nash was considered to be a box-office bomb, with its budget estimated at $100 million and domestic box office $4,420,080 and $2,683,893 overseas. It had a total worldwide gross of $7,103,973. In 2014, the Los Angeles Times listed the film as one of the most expensive box office flops of all time.

=== Home media ===
The film was released on DVD and VHS on November 19, 2002, by Warner Home Video.
