= Swept Away (2002 film) =

2002 film by Guy Ritchie

- Theatrical release poster
- Directed by: Guy Ritchie
- Written by: Guy Ritchie
- Based on: Swept Away by Lina Wertmüller
- Produced by: Matthew Vaughn
- Starring: Madonna; Adriano Giannini; Bruce Greenwood; Jeanne Tripplehorn
- Cinematography: Alex Barber
- Edited by: Eddie Hamilton
- Music by: Michel Colombier
- Production companies: Screen Gems; CODI SpA; SKA Films
- Distributed by: Sony Pictures Releasing
- Release date: 11 October 2002
- Running time: 89 minutes
- Countries: United States; United Kingdom; Italy
- Languages: English; Greek; Italian
- Budget: $10 million
- Box office: $1 million

Swept Away is a 2002 adventure romantic comedy film written and directed by Guy Ritchie; it is a remake of Lina Wertmüller's 1974 Italian film of the same name. The film stars Ritchie's then-wife Madonna and Adriano Giannini (the son of Giancarlo Giannini, the original film's lead) with a supporting cast featuring Bruce Greenwood, Jeanne Tripplehorn, and Elizabeth Banks.

The film was produced by Matthew Vaughn and released theatrically by Screen Gems. The film received overwhelmingly negative reviews from critics, who criticized Madonna's performance and Ritchie's direction. It was also a commercial failure, grossing $1 million on a $10 million budget. Additionally, the film is considered by critics to be inferior to the original, and has since been regarded as one of the worst films ever made.

== Plot ==
Amber Leighton, a wealthy, spoiled socialite wife of a millionaire Tony Leighton, joins two other couples on a private cruise from Greece to Italy. Amber develops an instant and intense dislike for Giuseppe, a deckhand, and insults him mercilessly throughout the trip. During the trip, she insists on being taken out on a dinghy for a lark, overruling Giuseppe's warnings about an oncoming storm.

During their dinghy trip, Amber berates Giuseppe incessantly, which only intensifies once they run out of gas. Through a series of mishaps, Amber damages the dinghy and they end up washing ashore on a deserted island.

On the island, Giuseppe gains the upper hand in their interactions due to his survival skills. As the roles reverse, Giuseppe becomes more dominant in his treatment of Amber, while she concurrently becomes more submissive and cowering. Their relationship evolves into intimacy.

Amber realises that she has become very happy on the island with Giuseppe and when she notices a boat anchored in the bay, she hides to avoid their being rescued.

Eventually, the two are rescued and return to their normal lives. Giuseppe attempts to reach out to Amber, to rekindle their relationship, but his messages receive no reply. Giuseppe believes that Amber has rejected him, and is despondent. However, it is revealed at the end that his letters have been intercepted by Amber's millionaire husband Tony, who ensures that Amber never sees them or Giuseppe again.

== Cast ==
- Madonna as Amber Leighton
- Adriano Giannini as Giuseppe Esposito
- Bruce Greenwood as Tony Leighton
- Jeanne Tripplehorn as Marina
- Elizabeth Banks as Debi
- Michael Beattie as Todd
- David Thornton as Michael

== Production ==
The film's working title was Love, Sex, Drugs and Money and was filmed in Sardinia and Malta from 1 October 2001 until 9 November 2001 with security increased due to the 9/11 terrorist attacks. Madonna had finished her 2001 Drowned World Tour only two weeks prior to filming. Giancarlo Giannini's role in the original film is played by his son Adriano Giannini.

== Release ==
=== Critical reception ===
On the review aggregator website Rotten Tomatoes, 6% of 79 critics' reviews are positive, with an average rating of 3.2/10. The website's consensus reads: "Muddled and lacking the political context of the original, Swept Away offers further proof that Madonna can't act." Metacritic, which uses a weighted average, assigned the film a score of 18 out of 100, based on 27 critics, indicating "overwhelming dislike".

Roger Ebert, of the Chicago Sun-Times, who called the original Swept Away such an "absorbing movie" that he bestowed a 4-out-of-4 star rating, gave the remake only 1 star. According to Ebert, despite Ritchie's relatively faithful adaptation, the original Swept Away was "incomparably superior", and the remake's fatal flaw was the "utterly missing" vitality or emotional resonance of the main characters. Additionally, wrote Ebert, Madonna's character "starts out so hateful that she can never really turn it around" and gain any redemption or believable change. Similarly, A.O. Scott of The New York Times wrote, "In her concerts, music videos and recordings, Madonna has often been a mesmerizing performer, but she is still not much of an actress. Striking a pose is not the same as embodying a person, and a role like this one requires the surrender of emotional control, something Madonna seems constitutionally unable to achieve." In his otherwise negative review of the film, Slant Magazine critic Ed Gonzalez said: "Madonna gives her best performance since Abel Ferrara had her beaten to a pulp in his Dangerous Game."

"The way critics take it out on me now is to have a go at anything me and Guy do together," Madonna remarked about the negative critical reaction. "Everyone in England has slagged it off without having seen it. Isn't that beautiful? Don't you think that's absurd? But I think the knives were going to come out for Guy anyway, even if he hadn't ended up with me. He had too much success with his first two films [Lock, Stock and Two Smoking Barrels and Snatch]. That's how the media is: eventually they have to pull you down."

=== Box office ===
Swept Away grossed $598,645 in the United States and around $437,875 from foreign territories for a worldwide total of $1,036,520.

=== Accolades ===
Year	Award	Category	Nominee(s)	Result	Ref.
2002	23rd Golden Raspberry Awards	Worst Picture	Swept Away	style="background: #9EFF9E; color: #000; vertical-align: middle; text-align: center; " class="yes table-yes2 notheme"|Won	
2002	23rd Golden Raspberry Awards	Worst Actress	Madonna (also for Die Another Day)	style="background: #9EFF9E; color: #000; vertical-align: middle; text-align: center; " class="yes table-yes2 notheme"|Won	
2002	23rd Golden Raspberry Awards	Worst Screen Couple	Madonna and Giannini	style="background: #9EFF9E; color: #000; vertical-align: middle; text-align: center; " class="yes table-yes2 notheme"|Won	
2002	23rd Golden Raspberry Awards	Worst Remake or Sequel	Swept Away	style="background: #9EFF9E; color: #000; vertical-align: middle; text-align: center; " class="yes table-yes2 notheme"|Won	
2002	23rd Golden Raspberry Awards	Worst Director	Guy Ritchie	style="background: #9EFF9E; color: #000; vertical-align: middle; text-align: center; " class="yes table-yes2 notheme"|Won	
2002	23rd Golden Raspberry Awards	Worst Screenplay	Guy Ritchie	Nomstyle="background: #FFE3E3; color: black; vertical-align: middle; text-align: center; " class="no table-no2 notheme"|Nominatedinated	
2002	23rd Golden Raspberry Awards	Worst Actor	Adriano Giannini	Nomstyle="background: #FFE3E3; color: black; vertical-align: middle; text-align: center; " class="no table-no2 notheme"|Nominatedinated	
2003	2002 Stinkers Bad Movie Awards	Worst Picture	Swept Away	style="background: #9EFF9E; color: #000; vertical-align: middle; text-align: center; " class="yes table-yes2 notheme"|Won	
2003	2002 Stinkers Bad Movie Awards	Worst Actress	Madonna	style="background: #9EFF9E; color: #000; vertical-align: middle; text-align: center; " class="yes table-yes2 notheme"|Won	
2003	2002 Stinkers Bad Movie Awards	Worst On-Screen Couple	Madonna and Giannini	style="background: #9EFF9E; color: #000; vertical-align: middle; text-align: center; " class="yes table-yes2 notheme"|Won	
2003	2002 Stinkers Bad Movie Awards	Worst Director	Guy Ritchie	style="background: #FFE3E3; color: black; vertical-align: middle; text-align: center; " class="no table-no2 notheme"|Nominated	
2003	2002 Stinkers Bad Movie Awards	Most Intrusive Musical Score	Michel Colombier	style="background: #FFE3E3; color: black; vertical-align: middle; text-align: center; " class="no table-no2 notheme"|Nominated	
2003	2002 Stinkers Bad Movie Awards	Worst Remake	Swept Away	style="background: #FFE3E3; color: black; vertical-align: middle; text-align: center; " class="no table-no2 notheme"|Nominated	

The film was awarded five awards at the 2002 Golden Raspberry Awards. Additionally, Madonna won Worst Supporting Actress that same year (for Die Another Day). The film was nominated for Worst Screenplay (written by Ritchie), and Giannini for Worst Actor. It was the first to win both Worst Picture and Worst Remake or Sequel.

At the 2002 Stinkers Bad Movie Awards, the film won three awards: Worst Picture, Worst Actress for Madonna, and Worst On-Screen Couple for Madonna and Giannini. The film also received nominations for Worst Director (Ritchie), Most Intrusive Musical Score, and Worst Remake.

== Soundtrack ==
Original Motion Picture Soundtrack: Swept Away

Soundtrack album by Michel Colombier
- Released: 15 October 2002
- Length: 43:28
- Label: Varèse Sarabande

The score was composed by Michel Colombier, and it is mostly his work that is featured on the 12-track soundtrack album. The soundtrack also contains several songs by other artists. "Come-On-a-My-House", sung by Della Reese, is the only one featured on the album.

Songs not featured on the album include "Lovely Head" by Goldfrapp (played during the opening credits), "Ain't Nobody Here but Us Chickens" by Louis Jordan (the charades scene), and "Fade into You" by Mazzy Star (as Amber and Pepe experience life on the island together). Arvo Pärt's "Spiegel im Spiegel" plays during the closing moments and end credits of the film.

== Home media ==
In the United Kingdom, the film was released direct-to-video by Columbia TriStar Home Entertainment. The DVD special features include a filmmakers' commentary with Ritchie and Vaughn, an interview with Ritchie and Madonna, sixteen deleted scenes, Movie Special (making of), theatrical trailers, and filmographies. In 2019 Swept Away was reissued on DVD and released on Blu-ray by Fabulous Films, under license from Sony Pictures.

== See also ==
- List of 21st century films considered the worst
- Survival Island
