= Michael McQuarn =

American writer and director

- Born: Michael George McQuarn; May 15, 1969 (age 57); Los Angeles, California, U.S.
- Died: November 23, 2022
- Occupations: Screenwriter, director, television, film producer, Music producer, Music supervisor,

Michael George McQuarn (born May 15, 1969) is an American writer, producer and director of television, film and commercials. McQuarn is the CEO of Good Job Baby, which is a boutique entertainment company that focuses on building brands, photography, film and commercial production. McQuarn was a hugely successful music supervisor on over 45 film and television projects. In 2001, McQuarn won an American Music Award for Best Soundtrack for the film Save the Last Dance, which sold over 3 million albums worldwide.

== Biography ==
McQuarn was born in Los Angeles, California. Graduated UCLA, where received a degree in film. After college McQuarn worked at Warner Brothers Studios as a story analyst. McQuarn used this opportunity at Warner Brothers to hone his skills as a writer and went on to sell his first studio screenplay by the age of 21. McQuarn and his sister Tracey Edmonds started Yab Yum, which was a highly successful record label and music publishing company distributed through 550 Music. McQuarn was responsible for launching the career of multi platinum recording artist and producer, Jon B, which McQuarn served as executive producer to his 3 albums under Yab Yum, which garnered two multi platinum albums and one gold.

McQuarn's entry into film was as the co-producer to the film Soul Food, which went on to earn over 45 million at the box office and won four NAACP Awards. McQuarn then produced the cult film entitled Punks, which was entered into the 2000 Sundance Film Festival and was also nominated for the coveted Independent Spirit John Cassavetes Award at the 2001 Independent Spirit Awards.

McQuarn has produced and directed over 300 hours of television content on such networks as NBCUniversal, A+E Networks, MTV, BET, TV One (US TV network) with new shows in development at Discovery Channel and Fuse (TV channel).

McQuarn is a cancer survivor. He was diagnosed in 2017 and received radical treatment in Vienna Austria, which has helped to control the aggression of the cancer.

McQuarn is currently producing and starring in a podcast entitled The Antidote.

McQuarn resides between Los Angeles, CA and Austin, TX.

== Filmography ==
=== Film ===
Year	Film	Notes
1996	Soul Food (film)	Co-Producer
2001	Punks (film)	Producer
2007	Who's Your Caddy	Co-Producer

=== Television ===
Year	Show	Role	Notes
2011–12	Master of the Mix	Executive producer, Director	Season 1&2
2011	Beauties and the Boss	Executive producer/Director	Season 1
2009	First In	Executive Producer/Director	Season 1
2009	Black Poker Stars Invitational	Executive Producer/Director	Season 1
2004–2007	"College Hill"	Executive Producer	Season 1–6
2007	"Stage Black"	Executive Producer/ Director	Season 1
2006	"DMX: Soul of a Man"	Executive Producer / Director	Season 1
2006	"Lil Kim: Countdown to Lockdown"	Executive Producer / Director	Season 1
