= The Rec Room =

Canadian restaurant chain

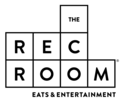

- The Rec Room in South Edmonton Common, Edmonton, Alberta.
- Type: Subsidiary
- Industry: Entertainment restaurants
- Founded: 2015; 11 years ago, in Edmonton, Alberta Canada
- Headquarters: Winnipeg, Manitoba, Canada
- Number of locations: 10
- Products: Chicken wings Burgers; Pizza
- Services: Bowling; Axe throwing Mini golf Pool; Arcade; Driving simulator Virtual reality
- Parent: Cineplex Entertainment
- Website: therecroom.com

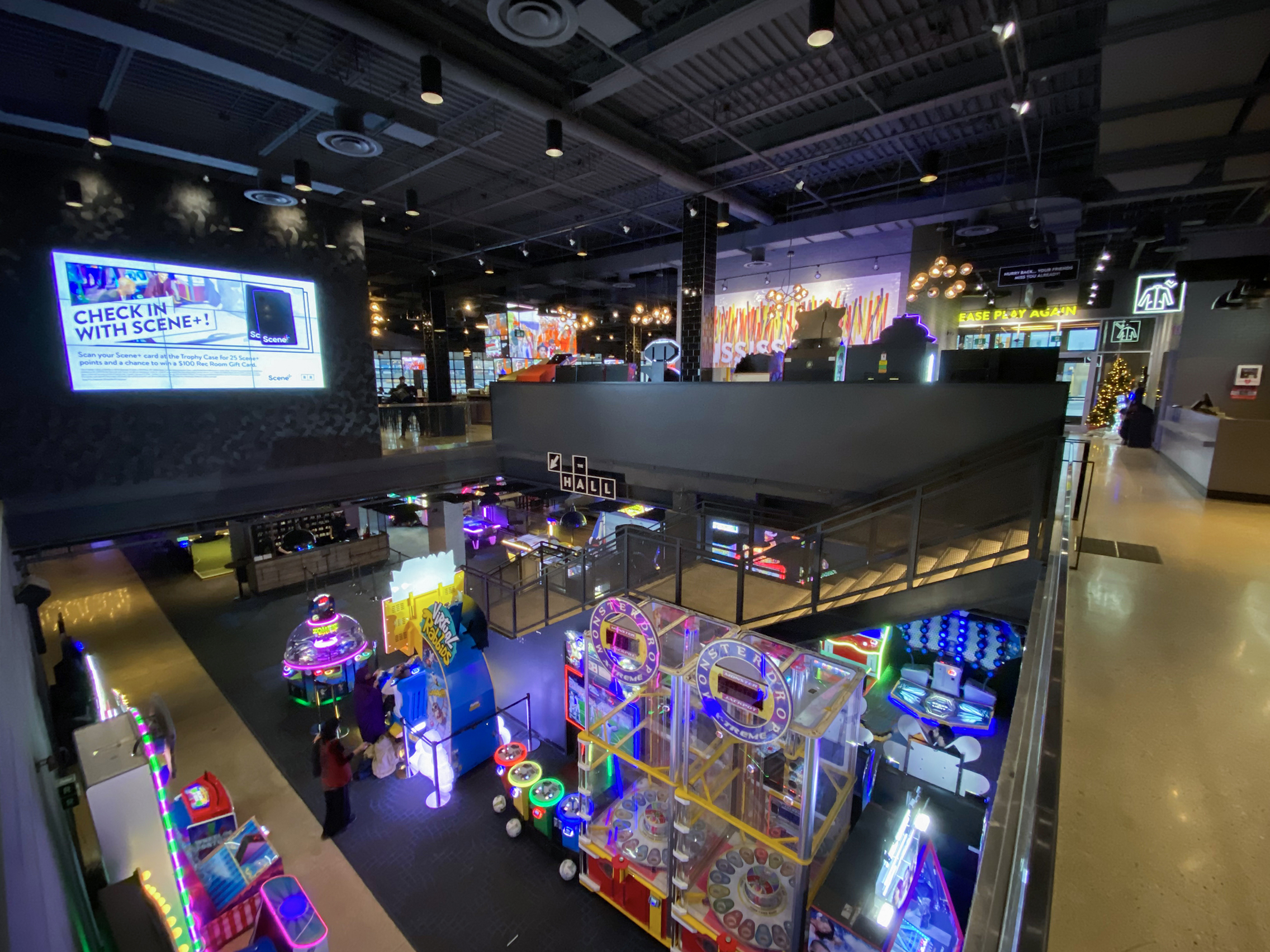
The Rec Room in Square One, Mississauga

The Rec Room is a Canadian chain of entertainment restaurants owned by Cineplex Entertainment. It first opened in Edmonton in 2016 and its locations feature entertainment and recreational attractions such as an arcade, driving simulators; recreational games such as darts, bowling, archery, and virtual reality; as well as restaurants and bars, and an auditorium with a cinema-style screen, which can be used for concerts and other live events.

== History ==
In April 2014, it was reported by The Wall Street Journal that Cineplex Entertainment and Onex Corporation were considering an offer to acquire the U.S.-based entertainment centre chain Dave & Buster's. During its annual general meeting in May, Cineplex CEO Ellis Jacob identified arcades as a means of diversifying the company's business beyond cinemas, emphasizing the recent introduction of its XScape concept at Cineplex cinemas, and explaining that "you can expand into more than just Playdium. You can make it a sports bar concept, which I think has a lot of runway in the future."

In January 2015, Cineplex announced a new entertainment restaurant concept known as The Rec Room, with initial locations set for Calgary's Deerfoot City, South Edmonton Common, and Roundhouse Park in Toronto. Jacob explained that the chain was meant to help the company diversify beyond its core cinema business in the wake of the growing streaming industry.

The first location opened in South Edmonton Common in September 2016. A second location at Roundhouse Park opened in June 2017, along with a second Edmonton location at West Edmonton Mall.

Cineplex aimed to open 10-15 locations of The Rec Room nationally, ranging in size from 30,000 to 50,000 square feet. The company subsequently announced and opened other locations, including Masonville Place in London, Square One Shopping Centre in Mississauga (replacing parts of the former Target Canada store), Avalon Mall in St. Johns, Seasons of Tuxedo in Winnipeg, and Brentwood Town Centre in Burnaby. In May 2019, Cineplex announced a second Vancouver-area location on Granville Street which would feature a rooftop patio. Originally slated to open in 2021, it was delayed to November 2024 due to the COVID-19 pandemic. In September 2019, Cineplex announced plans to open their first Quebec location at Royalmount in Mount Royal, which is slated to open in fall 2024.

The Toronto location features The Void virtual reality attraction. In July 2018, Cineplex announced that it would become the exclusive Canadian franchisee of The Void and add additional locations (such as the Mississauga and West Edmonton Mall locations).

== Locations ==
- Alberta
  - Deerfoot, Calgary
  - South Edmonton, Edmonton
  - West Edmonton Mall, Edmonton
- British Columbia
  - Brentwood Town Centre, Burnaby
  - Granville Entertainment District, Vancouver
- Manitoba
  - Seasons of Tuxedo, Winnipeg
- Newfoundland and Labrador
  - Avalon Mall, St. John's
- Ontario
  - Masonville, London
  - Park Place, Barrie
  - Roundhouse Park, Toronto
  - Square One Shopping Centre, Mississauga
- Quebec
  - Royalmount, Mount Royal

== See also ==
- Dave & Buster's
- Player One Amusement Group
