= Masonville Place =

CF Masonville Place
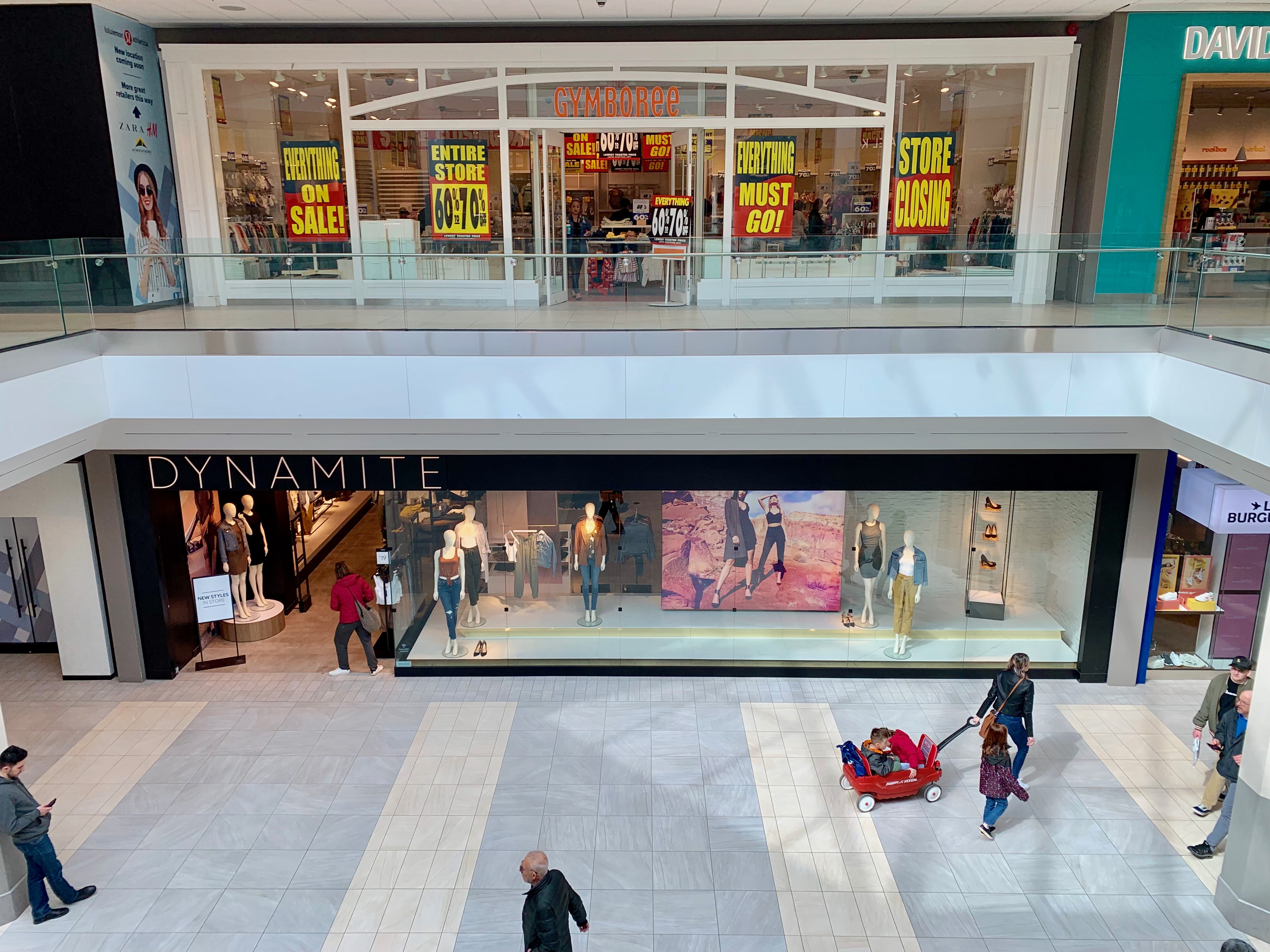
- Interior of Masonville Place
- Location: London, Ontario, Canada
- Coordinates: 43.02548°N 81.27874°W
- Address: 1680 Richmond Street North; London, Ontario; N6G 3Y9
- Opened: January 2, 1985; 41 years ago
- Developer: Cadillac Fairview Corporation
- Manager: Cadillac Fairview Corporation
- Owner: Cadillac Fairview Corporation
- Num. of stores: 162
- Num. of anchor tenants: 7
- Floor area: 686,000 sq ft (63,700 m^{2}).
- Floors: 2
- Website: www.cfshops.com/masonville-place.html

Masonville Place (known locally as Masonville or Masonville Mall, and corporately styled as CF Masonville Place) is a two-storey regional shopping mall located in London, Ontario, Canada, at the southeast corner of Fanshawe Park Road and Richmond Street. The mall contains over 130 stores, several restaurants, and a food court. Masonville Place is anchored by several large retailers including Marshalls/HomeSense, H&M, Sport Chek/Atmosphere, Zara, and Urban Planet. Cineplex Cinemas has two locations at the shopping mall, the SilverCity / IMAX theatres, and The Rec Room, an entertainment facility featuring food, drink, and arcade games.

Masonville Place opened on January 2, 1985. It was the third multi-level shopping centre to open in London, after Westmount Mall and White Oaks Mall. It was anchored by Sears, Eaton's, and Loblaws, although Loblaws opened on its own in late 1984, preceding the building of the rest of the mall.

== Location ==
The shopping mall is located in North London's Masonville neighbourhood, adjacent to the transit corridor of Fanshawe Park Road and Richmond Street. It has a bus terminal for the London Transit Commission serviced by the following routes: 10, 13, 13A, 16, 25, 34, 90, 92 and 93. The mall is expected to be the terminus of one route on the planned London Bus Rapid Transit system.

== History ==
=== Beginnings ===
Masonville Place was constructed by the Cadillac Fairview Corporation Limited and opened in 1985.

=== Expansion ===
In 1991, Masonville expanded with 75 new stores and services, including an indoor miniature golf course, which has since been removed and replaced with more stores. A Zellers store was built in 1994. It was replaced by Target in 2013. Target later closed all of its Canadian stores, leaving a vacancy in Masonville that Marshalls and HomeSense have since filled in 2017. In April 2018, the vacant upper floor of Target was filled by The Rec Room.

In October 1998, the Loblaws store closed, and a new standalone Loblaws was opened on the northeast corner of Fanshawe Park Road and Richmond Street. Eaton's store was closed in 1999 due to bankruptcy and was replaced in 2000 with The Bay which relocated from the Galleria Mall in the same city.

=== Renovations ===
On October 29, 2013, Sears Canada announced that it would close its store at the mall and several other locations throughout Canada to reduce costs. There were rumours that Nordstrom, an American retailer, was seeking to fill the space Sears had left, but these were dispelled in 2013 when Cadillac Fairview announced its plans.

On March 29, 2016, Cadillac Fairview announced that Masonville Place would receive significant renovations during 2016. The $77 million renovations included a two-level mall expansion into the former Sears store, which had occupied an area of approximately 127,000 square feet. The renovations and mall expansion were completed by November 2016 and includes London's first Disney Store, Zara, Hot Topic and Aroma Espresso Bar along with H&M and Atmosphere/Sport Chek. The Keg moved from Richmond Row in downtown London to occupy a portion of the space in the new renovation. In 2020, it was announced that Urban Planet would replace the former Forever 21 store. The Disney Store, Nando's, NYX Professional Makeup, Aroma Espresso Bar, and Hudson's Bay later closed.

Currently, the mall's tenants include Aritzia, Abercrombie & Fitch, Hollister Co., Lululemon, Lush, Shoppers Drug Mart, American Eagle Outfitters, an Apple Store, Sephora, Bath & Body Works, JD Sports, Miniso, Nike, and Roots.
