= Rec Room =

Rec Room may refer to:

- Recreation room, a room used for play, parties, or other recreational activities
- Rec Room (video game), a 2016 video game
- The Rec Room, a chain of entertainment restaurants
