= Avalon Mall =

Coordinates: 47°33′40.61″N 52°45′16.55″W

- Location: St. John's, Newfoundland and Labrador, Canada
- Address: 48 Kenmount Road
- Opened: November 1, 1967; 59 years ago
- Owner: Crombie REIT
- Num. of stores: 142
- Num. of anchor tenants: 1
- Floor area: 500,000 square feet (46,000 m^{2})
- Floors: 2
- Parking: 3550
- Website: shopavalonmall.com

The Avalon Mall is a Canadian shopping mall located in St. John's, Newfoundland and Labrador on Kenmount Road. With over 500,000 square feet (46,000 m^{2}), two floors, and 142 stores, it is the largest shopping mall in Newfoundland and Labrador. The mall opened on November 1, 1967, and is owned by Crombie REIT.

== History ==
The Avalon Mall underwent major extensions in 1977, 1987 and 1999. In the late 1980s and early 1990s, low retail performance prompted mall management to embark on major renovation programs. The Scotiabank branch was renovated. Department store Ayre and Sons became The Gap in 1991, but then renovated in early 2018 once more to become Charm Diamond Centres, Claire's, The Source, and Jump Plus. In 2005, the food court, washrooms, entrances and exterior of the mall underwent major renovations.

Some of the tenants of anchor locations are Winners/HomeSense (formerly Sobeys) and, until January 9, 2018, Sears. Sears was originally Woolco until 1994, then Walmart, which closed on January 25, 2005. In fall 2005, Sears opened in the Mall, this store went through liquidation and closed on January 9, 2018. Sobeys became Winners/HomeSense in spring 2006 with both Sobeys and Walmart moving to Kelsey Drive. Both Sears and Winners operated nearby at the Village Shopping Centre. A brand new Winners/HomeSense was opened in the former Sears store in 2019.

In 1999, Empire Theatres closed its five-screen cinema (with access to the first and second floors; with most outlets on the first floor) then a Studio 12 (12 screen) theatre opened on the other end of the second floor (close to the mall's food court, the largest in Atlantic Canada). On June 27, 2013, Empire Theatres announced that it would be selling this theatre along with 23 others in Atlantic Canada to Cineplex Entertainment. Empire Theatres closed on October 22, 2013, and reopened as Cineplex Cinemas on October 25, 2013, then switched to the brand Scotiabank Theatre in November 2014. On February 28, 2018, it was announced that Cineplex would open The Rec Room in the mall in early 2019, which is adjacent to the Scotiabank Theatre. On April 18, 2019, it was officially opened and became the first location to open in Atlantic Canada.

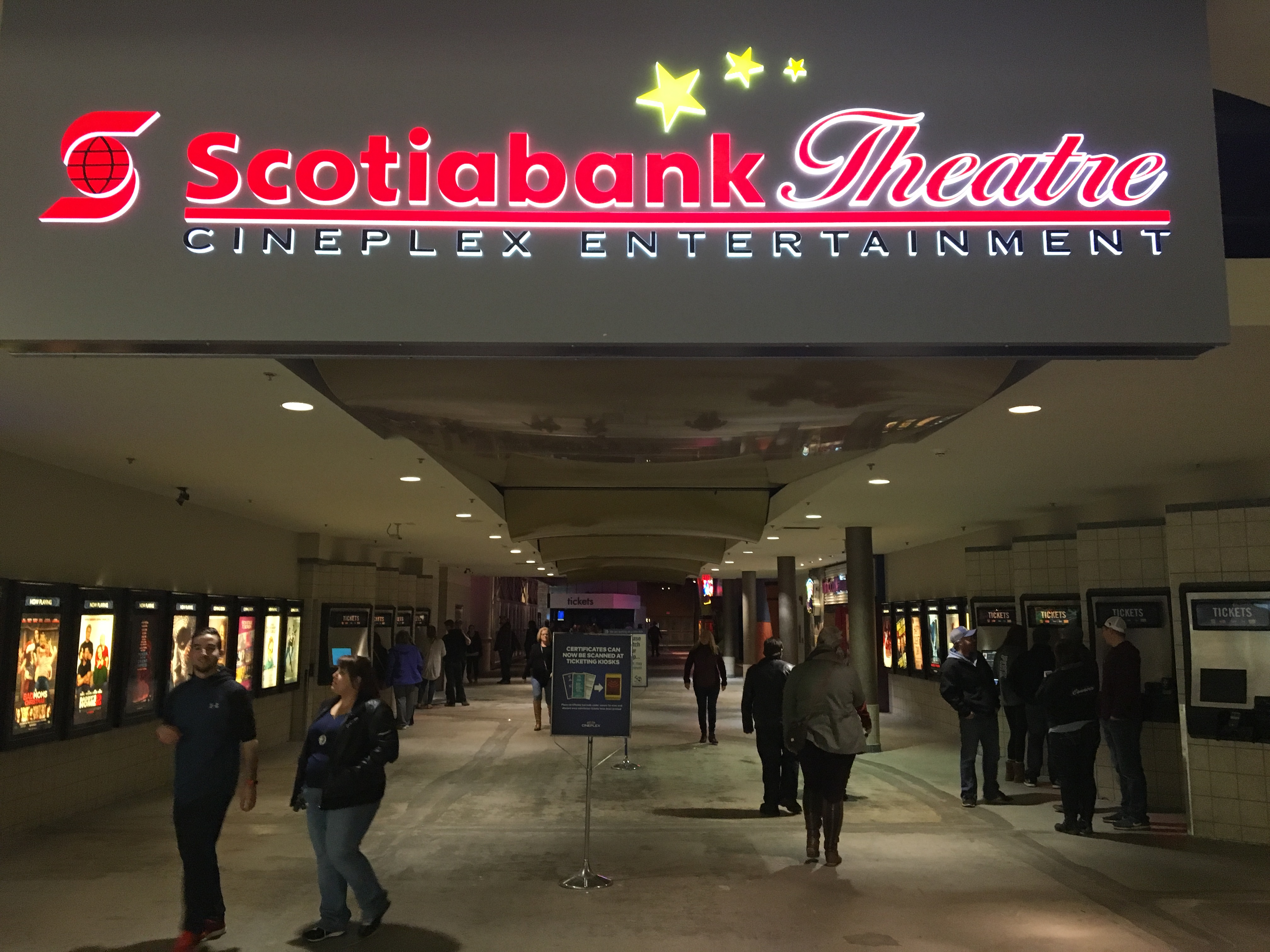
Scotiabank Theatre in The Avalon Mall located in St. John's, Newfoundland and Labrador, formerly Empire Theatres Studio 12.

Until provincial legalization of Sunday shopping in 1998, flea markets were common at the mall. This practice ended in December 2010, by mall management decision.

== Major retailers/anchors ==
- Scotiabank Theatre
- Winners
- HomeSense
- Sport Chek
- Lawtons
- Old Navy
- H&M
- Eclipse Clothing Stores

== Former retailers/anchors ==
- Addition Elle
- Aldo Accessories
- A Buck or Two
- Baskin-Robbins
- Bouclair (abandoned as of 2023)
- Carlton Cards (closed in 2020)
- Eddie Bauer
- Great Canadian Dollar Store
- Hallmark
- HMV
- Le Château
- Mark's
- Moores
- Mr. Sub
- Pearle Vision (closed in 2023)
- Sears (now a Sport Chek)
- Sobeys (now an Old Navy, originally a Winners and HomeSense)
- Sony Store
- The Source
- Sports Experts (closed in Aug. 2023)
- Toys "R" Us (no longer a tenant)
- Ultramar (now an Irving Oil)
- Wal-Mart

== See also ==
- List of shopping malls in Canada

== External links and sources ==
- Avalon Mall
