= Masonville, London =

Masonville
- Neighbourhood
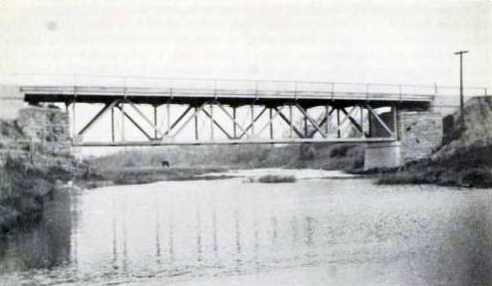
- Old Masonville Bridge

- Location in Ontario
- Coordinates: 43°02′16″N 81°17′07″W
- Country: Canada
- Province: Ontario
- City: London

Government
  - MP: Arielle Kayabaga (London West)
  - MPP: Peggy Sattler (London West)
  - Councillor: Corrine Rahman (Ward 7)

Population (2021)
  - Total: 10,260
- Time zone: UTC-5 (Eastern Time Zone)
  - Summer (DST): UTC-6 (Eastern Time Zone)
- Postal Code: N6G, N5X
- Area codes: 519, 226

Masonville is a neighbourhood in the city of London, Ontario, Canada. Located in the northern part of the city, the area is bordered by Fanshawe Park Road to the north, Wonderland Road to the west, Richmond Street to the east, and Windermere Road to the south. Almost all of its residents live in low-density, single detached dwellings.

== History ==
Acquired by London in 1961, it was previously rural farmland. In the 1980s, Masonville saw a construction boom, with single-detached homes, townhomes, apartment complexes, and student housing built thereafter.

For recreation, Masonville is home to a branch of the London Public Library. Masonville is notable for being the location of Masonville Place, a large shopping centre that opened in 1985, anchored by retailers including Cineplex Entertainment and Marshalls. It is also a hub for the London Transit Commission.

With a population of 10,260 as per the 2021 Canadian Census, Masonville has an almost even divide between men and women. Most of its population is between the ages of 15 and 64 years old. Masonville also has a large Chinese-origin population.

== Government and politics ==
Federally, Masonville has been represented by the northwestern riding of London West. A longtime Liberal Party stronghold, it has been represented by Arielle Kayabaga since the 2021 Canadian federal election.

Provincially, Masonville has been represented by the northwestern riding of London West. A longtime Ontario New Democratic Party stronghold, the riding has been represented by the NDP's Peggy Sattler since 2013.

Municipally, Masonville has been represented by Corrine Rahman at London City Council since the 2022 London, Ontario, municipal election.

== Education ==
Masonville is notably adjacent to the University of Western Ontario, or Western University.

The neighbourhood is home to multiple elementary and secondary schools, including:

- Masonville Public School (Thames Valley District School Board)
- St. Kateri Catholic School (London District Catholic School Board)
- Stoneybrook Public School (Thames Valley District School Board)
- Mother Teresa Catholic Secondary School (London District Catholic School Board)
- A.B Lucas Secondary School (Thames Valley District School Board)
- Jack Chambers Public School (Thames Valley District School Board)
