= Royalmount =

Shopping mall in Quebec, Canada

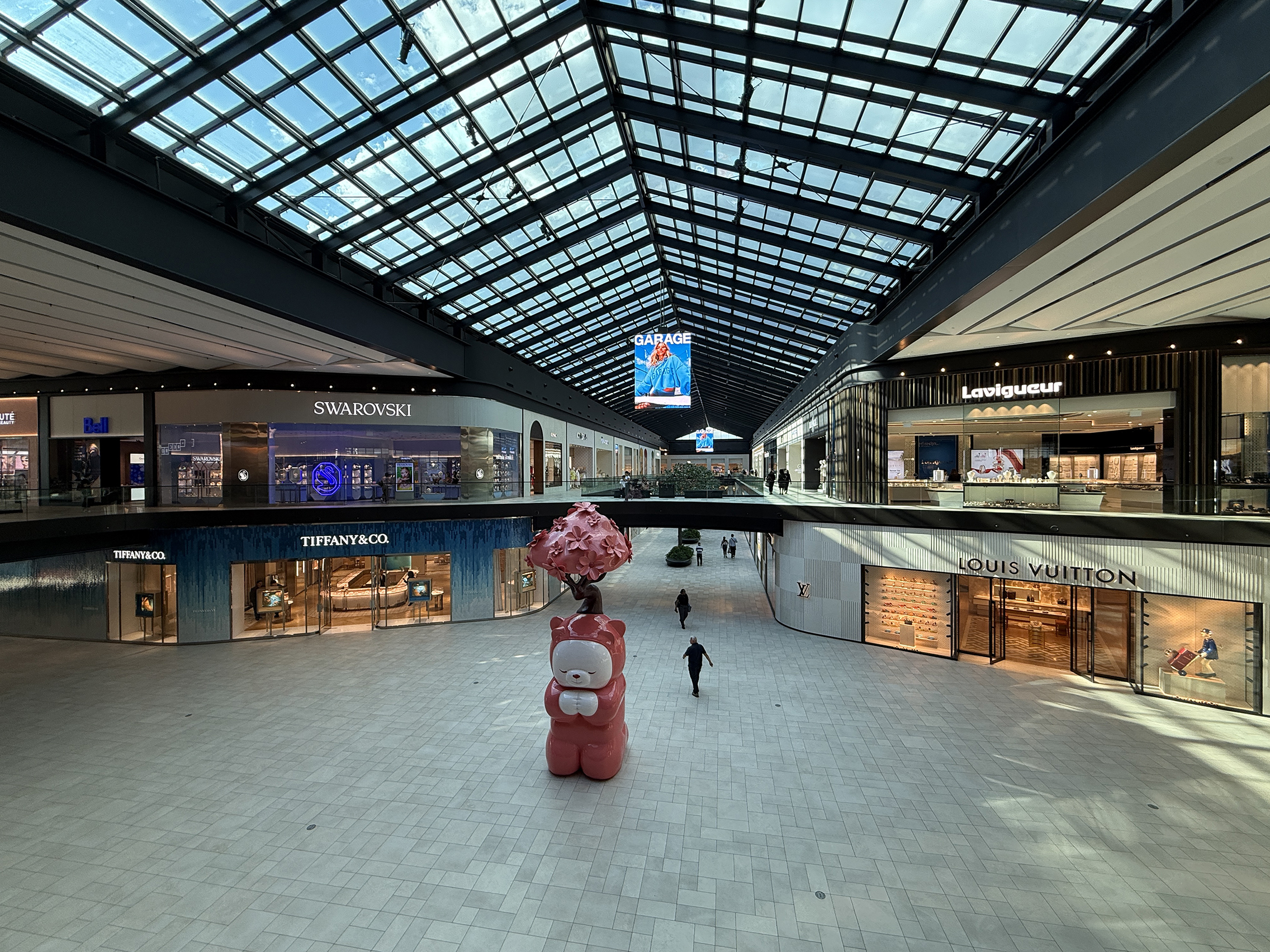
- Inside of Royalmount Mall
- Coordinates: 45.50°N 73.665°W
- Address: 5050 Côte-de-Liesse, Mont-Royal, QC H4P 0C9 Canada
- Opened: September 5, 2024
- Developer: Carbonleo
- Owner: Carbonleo
- Floor area: 824,000 square feet (76,600 m^{2}) (GLA)
- Floors: 2
- Parking: Paid underground and outdoors
- Public transit: De la Savane; STM Bus Routes: 17, 100, 368, 371, 382, 460
- Website: www.royalmount.com

Royalmount is a luxury shopping center, located in the city of Mount Royal, Quebec, Canada on the island of Montreal. Announced in 2015 by the real estate developer Carbonleo and design led by the architect firm Lemay, the project is built on a former industrial site of 2.5 million square feet at the junction of the Decarie and Metropolitan Highways.

The project evolved considerably during its planning and construction period. Work on the current development began before the COVID-19 pandemic, with construction of the commercial first phase proceeding toward a 2024 opening. The completed first phase represented roughly $1 billion to $1.5 billion of investment according to contemporary construction and media reports, while the long-term Royalmount master plan has been reported as a development potentially valued at around $7 billion.

== Features ==
Royalmount's contains approximately 824,000 square feet (76,550 m²) with 2 stories. Current description lists 170 stores and 60 restaurants and cafés, while emphasizing that roughly half of its retail concepts were new to the Montreal market. It also describes Royalmount as having the largest concentration of luxury flagship stores in Quebec. The mall also provide a food court "Le Fou Fou" designed by LemayMichaud, Cineplex cinema and The Rec Room.

RENNAÏ is a large-format luxury beauty, wellness and self-care destination located on Level 1, approximately 40,000 sq ft with 175 brands. The interior was developed through a collaboration between Borrallo Interiors, Lemay and Chrome Design, with Ana Borrallo.

At the centre of the mall is a 77,000-square-foot urban park. It provides lawns, slides, planting, pedestrian paths and gathering areas between the retail buildings.

Royalmount is served by the Montreal metro's De la Savane station (linked by a footbridge over Decarie Highway) and by Société de transport de Montréal bus routes.

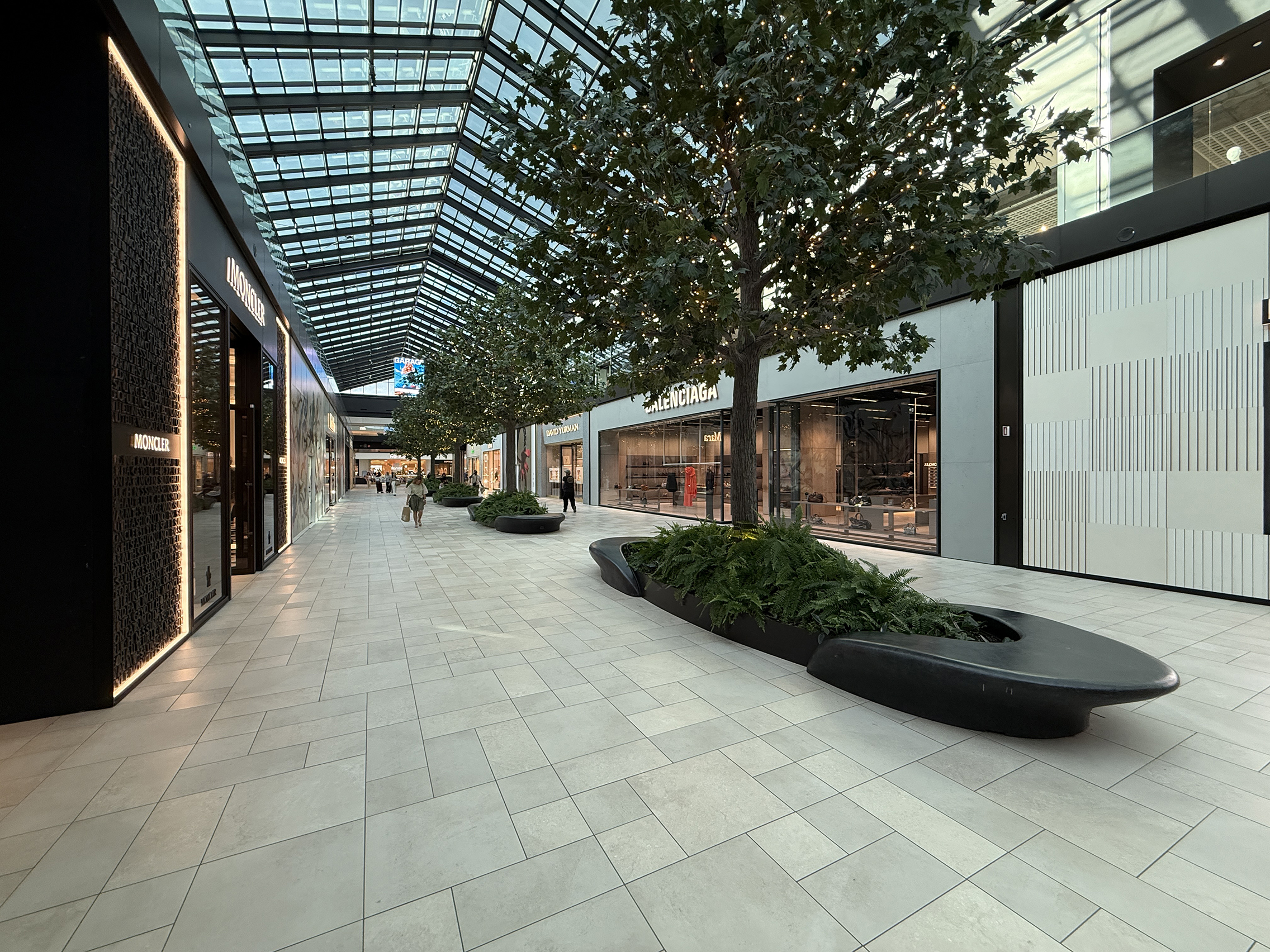
Wide pedestrian corridors inside the mall

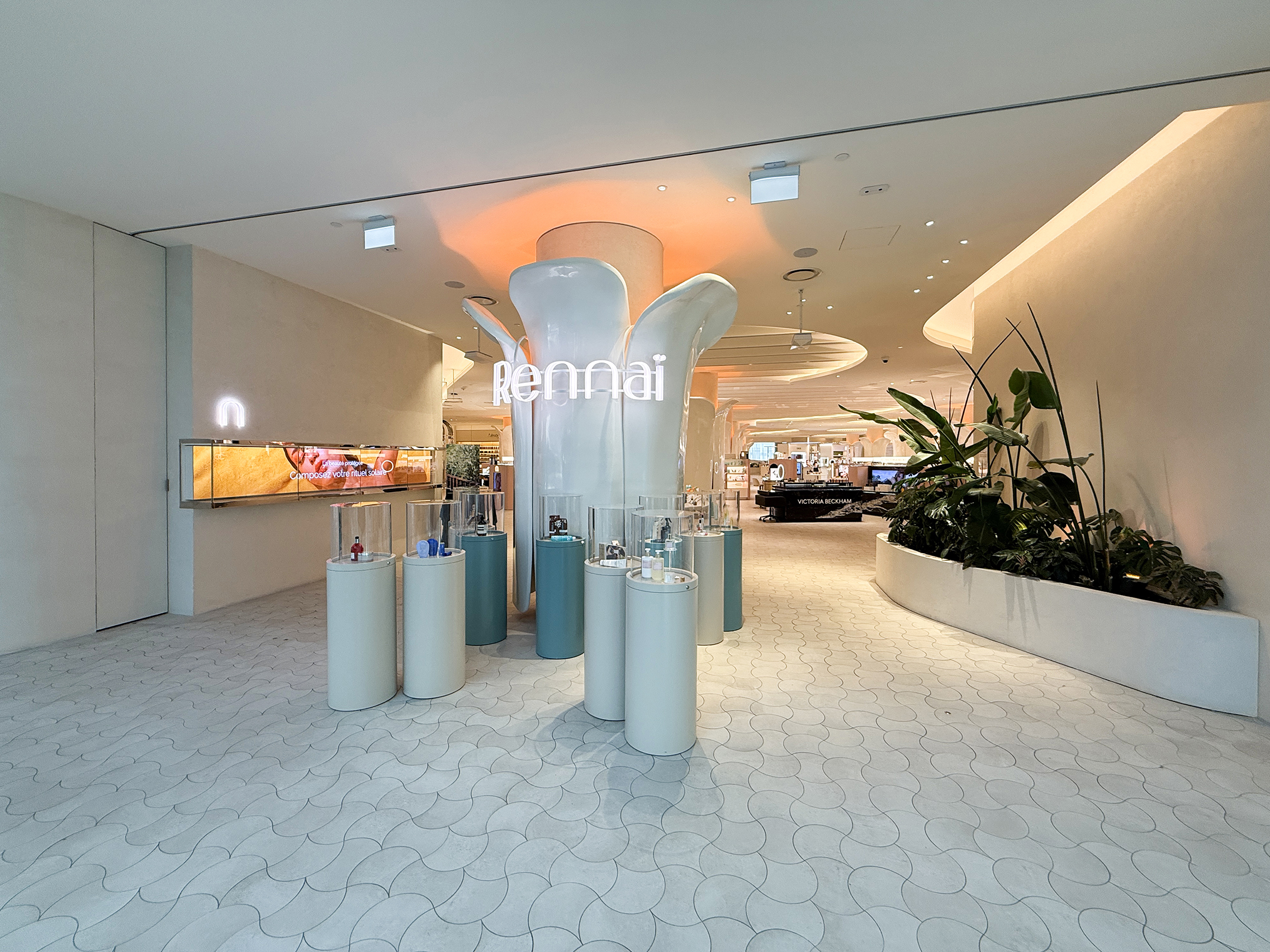
Beauty zone Rennai in Level 1

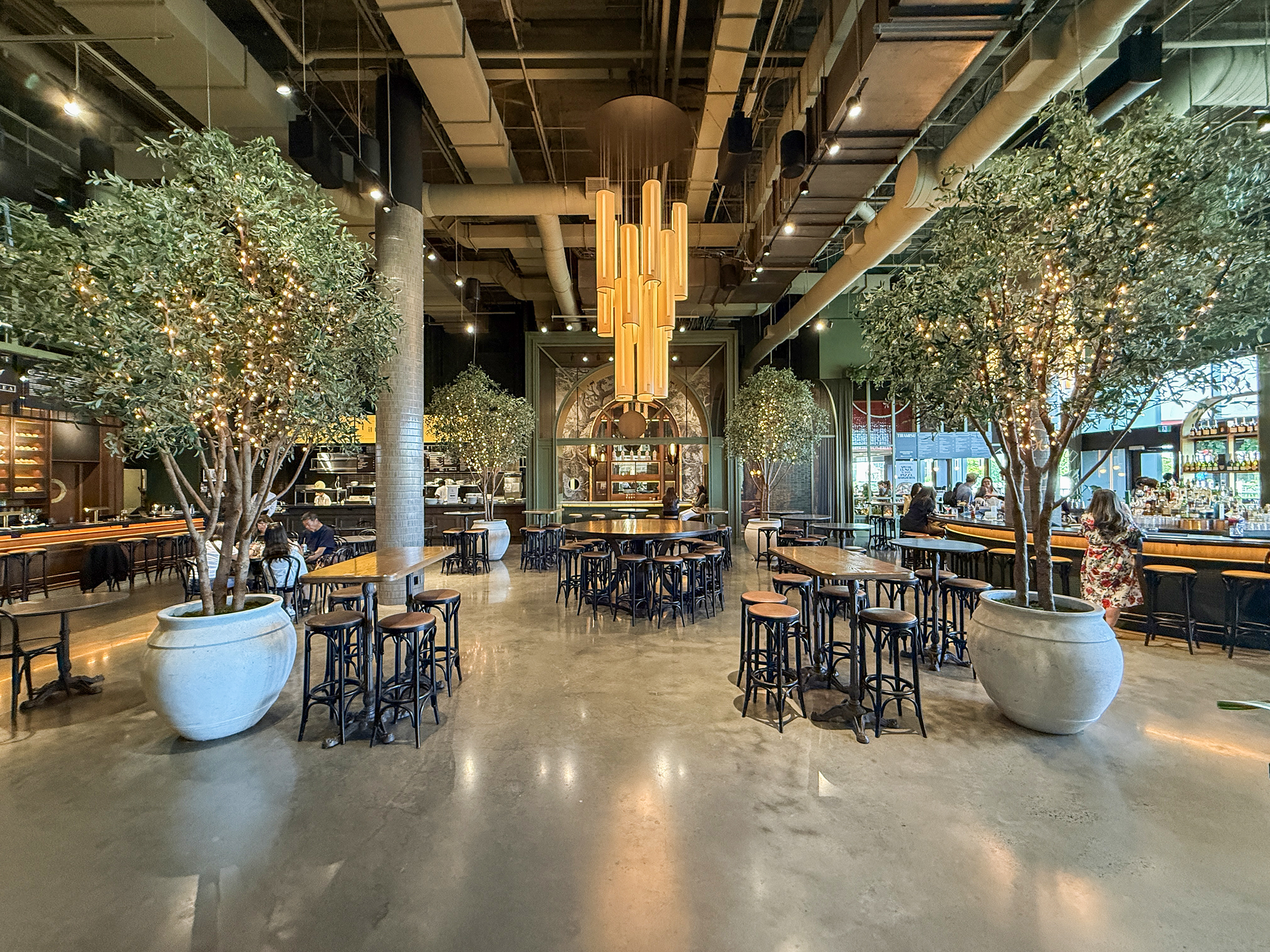
Le Fou Fou food hall in Level 2

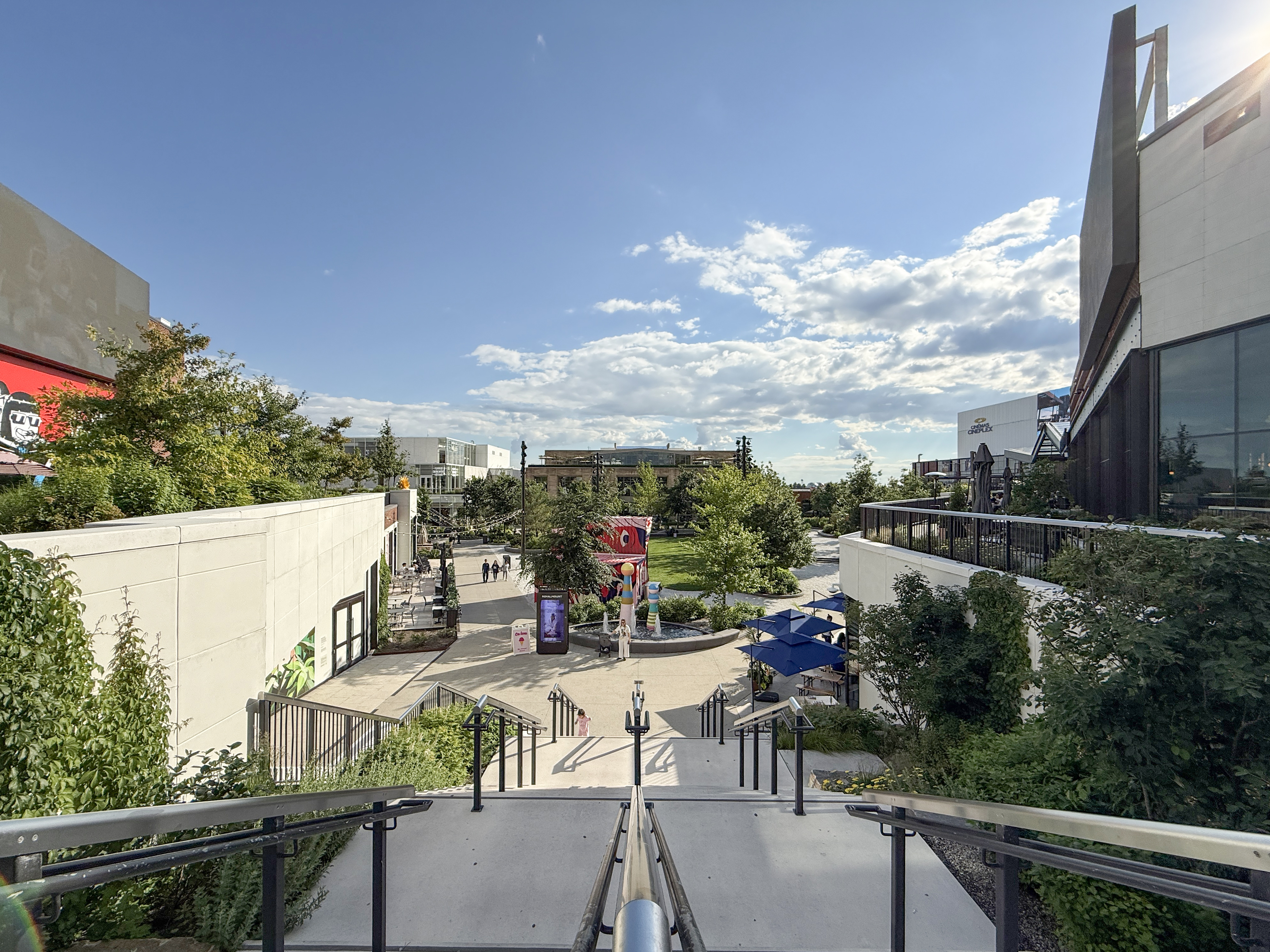
Urban park outside the mall
