= Scotiabank Theatre =

Canadian movie theater chain

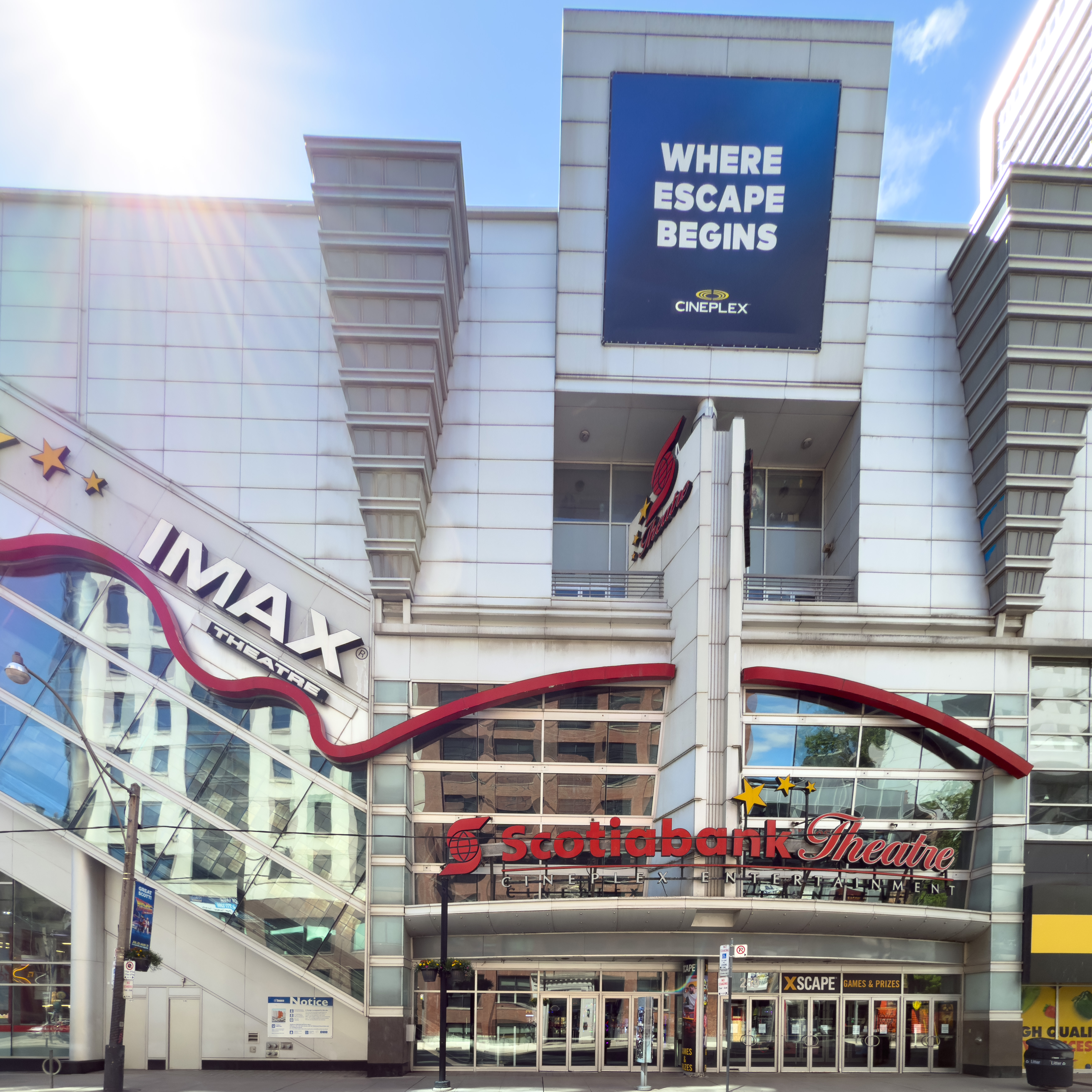
- Scotiabank Theatre in Toronto
- Type: Subsidiary
- Industry: Entertainment
- Predecessor: Paramount Theatre
- Founded: May 19, 1999; 27 years ago
- Headquarters: Toronto, Ontario, Canada
- Number of locations: 10
- Area served: Canada
- Owner: National Amusements (1999–2005); Cineplex Entertainment (2005–present)
- Website: www.cineplex.com

Scotiabank Theatre (French: Cinémas Banque Scotia) is a Canadian banner of multiplex cinemas owned by Cineplex Entertainment. The brand was established in 2007 as part of a wider partnership between Cineplex and Scotiabank on their new Scene loyalty program.

The brand is positioned as Cineplex's flagship banner, encompassing ten locations in major markets with a focus on offering premium amenities and formats. They include three locations that formerly operated under the Paramount Theatres brand prior to the acquisition of Famous Players by Cineplex (including the flagship Toronto location), as well as locations rebranded from other Cineplex banners.

== History ==
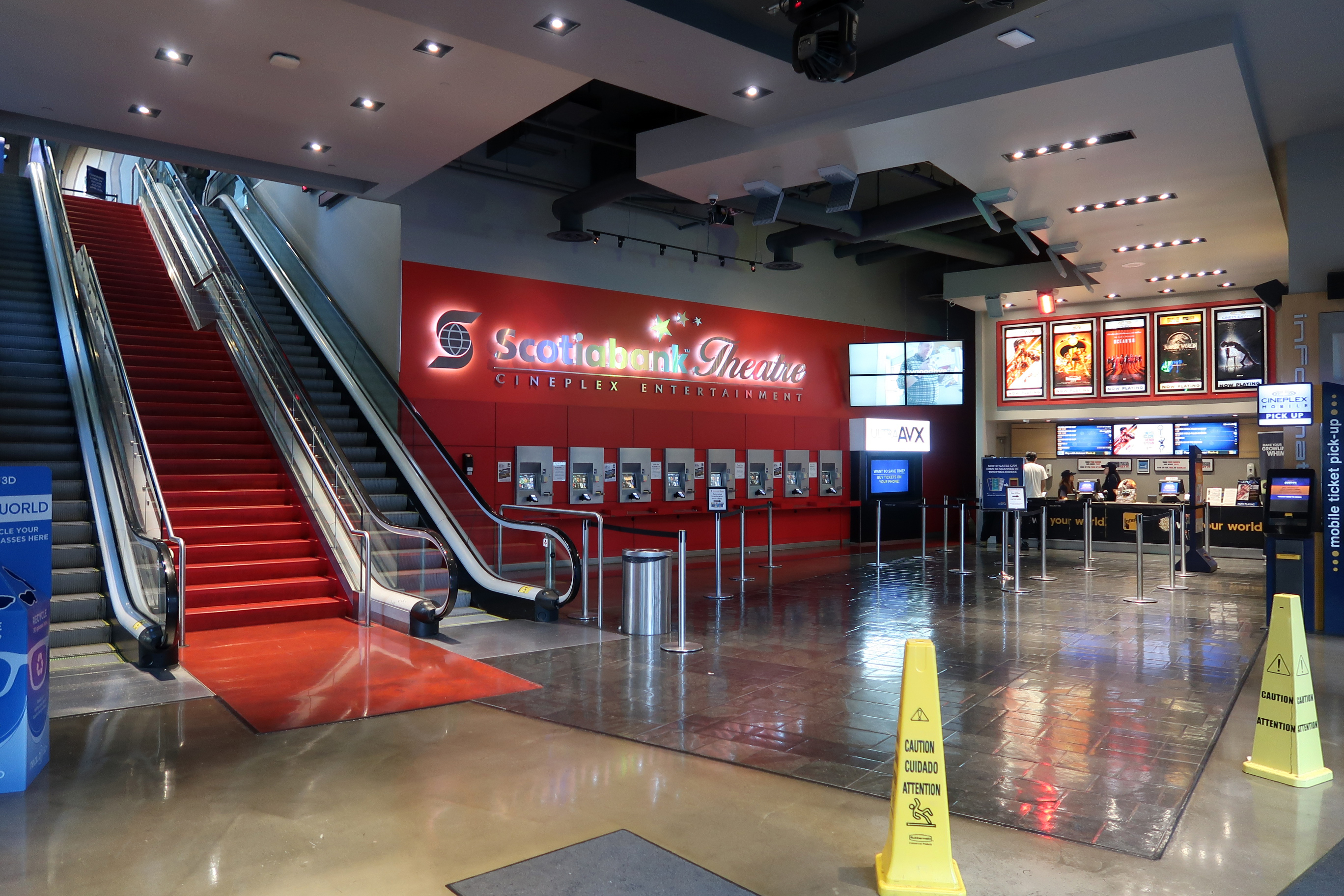
Vancouver, BC

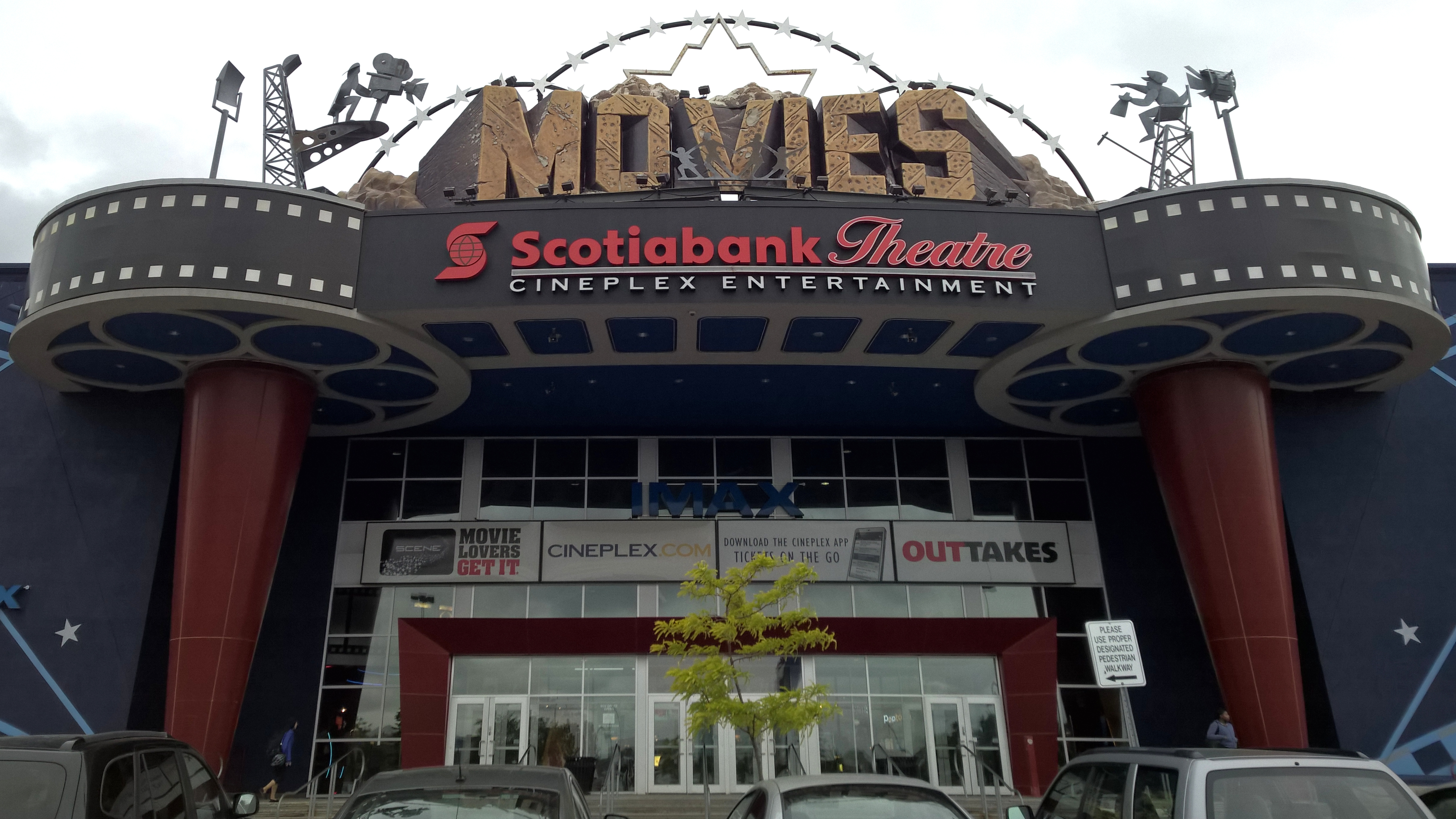
Ottawa, Ontario

The Famous Players Paramount Theatre logo used in the Toronto, Calgary, Montreal and Vancouver locations.

The first four locations opened in Montreal, Toronto, Calgary and Vancouver by Famous Players as Paramount theatres. The Paramount Theatre banner was the trademark of Paramount Pictures, the film studio of former owner Famous Players' parent company Viacom. In 2005, Viacom sold Famous Players to Cinema Galaxy Income Fund — owner of Cineplex Galaxy Cinemas — creating the company Cineplex Entertainment. The theatres were rebranded as Scotiabank Theatres, under a sponsorship arrangement with Canadian bank Scotiabank. In 2007, Cineplex Entertainment and Scotiabank expanded their partnership by extending the Scotiabank Theatre banner nationwide, including the rebranding of other remaining Paramount Theatre locations, and by launching the "Scene" entertainment rewards program.

The St. John's and Halifax locations were originally owned by Empire Theatres, but were purchased by Cineplex and rebranded as Cineplex Cinemas in October 2013, then to the Scotiabank Theatre brand in November 2014. Three more locations were formerly branded as SilverCity: the West Edmonton Mall location was rebranded on May 2, 2007, while Ottawa and Winnipeg were rebranded in the summer of 2016.

Three Scotiabank Theatre locations premiered the Barco Escape premium large format in Canada on July 22, 2016.

== Features ==
=== Premium screens ===
- 4DX is currently available at both Alberta locations and the Ottawa location.
- D-Box motion theatre technology is available at all Scotiabank Theatre locations. Normally, only one auditorium per location features this technology, but Calgary (Chinook) and Vancouver each have two such motion theatres.
  - Four locations, including those with two D-Box auditoriums, offer a D-Box UltraAVX option. This combines the motion theatre technology with 4K resolution and enhanced Dolby sound.
- IMAX is available at every Scotiabank Theatre location, with the exception of Saskatoon. All locations offer digital IMAX projections. Scotiabank Theatre Toronto is the sole location to feature IMAX with Laser technology, a significant improvement with 4K resolution and better colour.
  - IMAX 70 mm film playback is available at both Alberta locations, plus the Montreal and Halifax locations as of June 2026. Cinemas in Ottawa, Toronto and Winnipeg discontinued film playback.
- ScreenX features a 270-degree panoramic screen.
  - Cineplex previously offered Barco Escape at several Scotiabank Theatre locations. This format premiered in Canada on July 22, 2016 with Star Trek Beyond, featuring 20 minutes of the film optimised for this format.
- UltraAVX is available at most locations, except for Ottawa, Winnipeg and Atlantic locations. These theatres offer 4K resolution and enhanced Dolby sound.
- VIP Cinemas is exclusively available in three auditoriums at Scotiabank Theatre Saskatoon.

=== Virtual reality ===
In November 2017, an IMAX VR centre opened at Scotiabank Theatre Toronto, as IMAX VR's first location in Canada. The following month, a D-Box VR experience launched at the Ottawa location. Both virtual reality centres were later closed.

== Locations ==
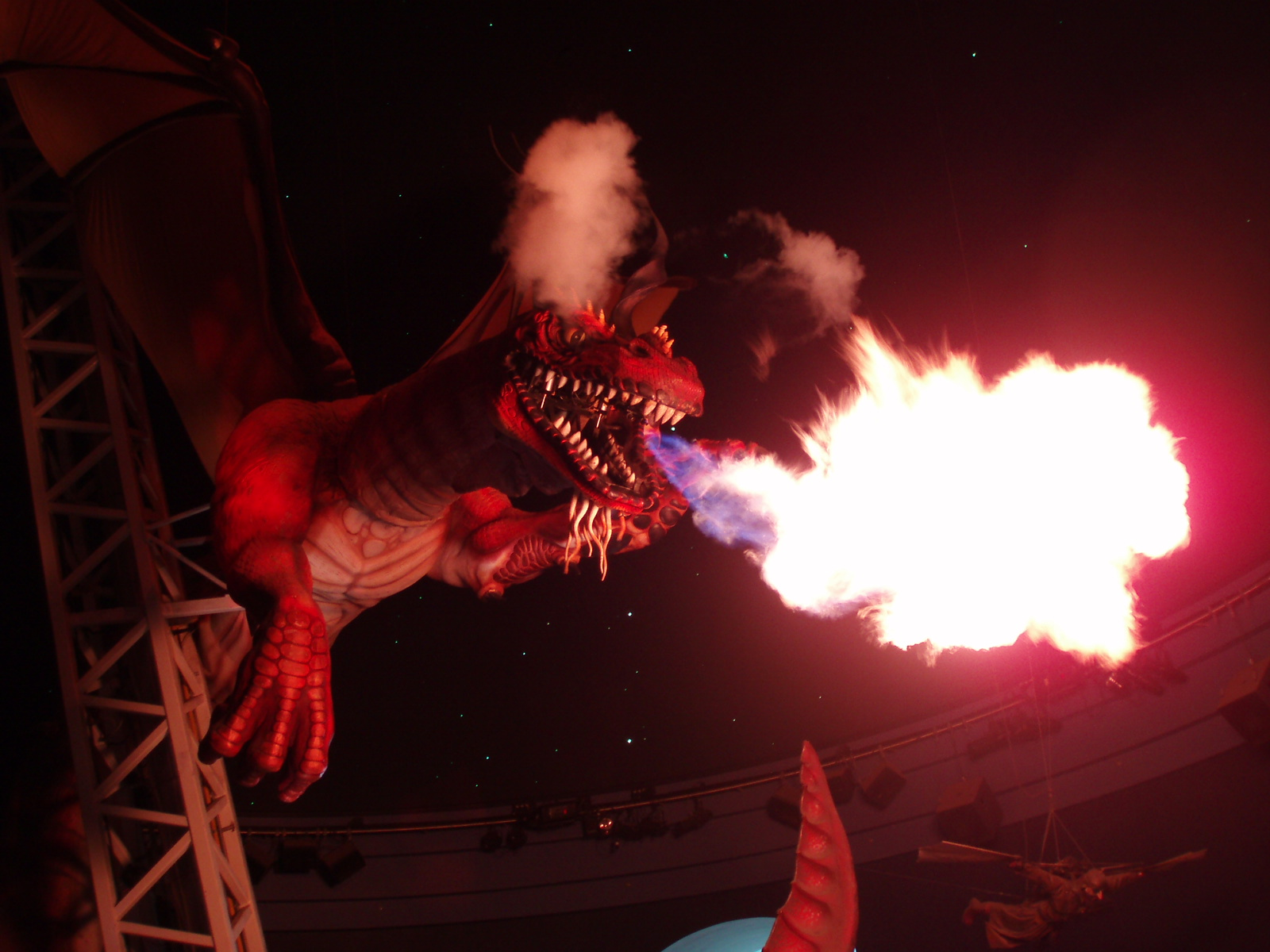
Former fire-breathing dragon animatronic at the West Edmonton Mall location. Removed in 2014 due to maintenance costs

There are currently ten locations:

Province	Theatre name	Former name	City	Opening date	UltraAVX	IMAX
British Columbia	Scotiabank Theatre Vancouver	Paramount Theatre Vancouver	Vancouver	April 29, 2005	✓	Digital
Alberta	Scotiabank Theatre Calgary-Chinook	Paramount Theatre Chinook	Calgary	March 23, 2001	✓	70mm film and digital
Alberta	Scotiabank Theatre Edmonton	SilverCity West Edmonton Mall Cinemas	Edmonton	May 14, 1999	✓	70mm film and digital
Saskatchewan	Scotiabank Theatre Saskatoon and VIP	Galaxy Cinemas Saskatoon	Saskatoon	September 1, 2006	✓	—N/a
Manitoba	Scotiabank Theatre Winnipeg	SilverCity Polo Park Cinemas	Winnipeg	November 24, 1999	—N/a	Digital
Ontario	Scotiabank Theatre Toronto	Paramount Theatre Toronto	Toronto	May 19, 1999	✓	Digital 4K with laser
Ontario	Scotiabank Theatre Ottawa	SilverCity Gloucester Cinemas	Ottawa	May 19, 1999	—N/a	Digital
Quebec	Cinéma Banque Scotia Montreal	Cinéma Paramount Montreal	Montreal	June 18, 1999	✓	70mm film and digital
Nova Scotia	Scotiabank Theatre Halifax	Empire 18, Cineplex Cinemas Bayers Lake	Halifax	December 12, 1997	—N/a	70mm film and digital
Newfoundland and Labrador	Scotiabank Theatre St. John's	Empire Studio 12, Cineplex Cinemas Avalon Mall	St. John's	December 17, 1999	—N/a	Digital

== Restaurants ==
As with many Cineplex locations, Scotiabank Theatre offers pizza and coffee at all of its locations. Montreal adds two Tim Hortons restaurants: a larger one on Saint Catherine Street that is accessible to the public, and a smaller one near the concession stand that is only available to theatre patrons. As these are Cineplex locations, they will accept Cineplex gift cards and Scotiabank Scene rewards, but not Tim Hortons gift cards. In 2022, it was removed completely and Starbucks took over the space outside the cinema. Alcohol is served at the Edmonton, Ottawa, Saskatoon and Toronto locations. Ottawa and Toronto have all their auditoriums licensed for alcohol consumption. The Saskatoon location only has its VIP auditoriums licensed for alcohol.

== Gaming ==
Xscape arcade are available at Scotiabank Theatre locations, except for the Vancouver location. These arcades use swipe cards instead of token coins. Scotiabank Theatre Vancouver features coin-operated claw cranes instead.

== See also ==
- List of Cineplex Entertainment movie theatres
