= Player One Amusement Group =

Canadian arcade game distributor

Coordinates: 43°41′38″N 79°37′31″W

- Formerly: Cineplex Starburst; Brady Starburst; Premier Amusements; Tricorp Amusements; Sega Amusement Works
- Type: Subsidiary
- Industry: Video Game Arcades; Amusement Parks; Entertainment
- Founded: 2012; 14 years ago (as Cineplex Starburst)
- Founder: Starburst Coin Machine; Cineplex Entertainment
- Headquarters: Mississauga, Canada
- Number of locations: 25 Offices (2017)
- Key people: John Kolliniatis (VP & General Manager)
- Products: Redemption (Ticket) Games; Video Arcade Games; Pinball; Kiddie Rides; Jukeboxes; Photo Booths; Table Games
- Services: Consultation; Entertainment; Merchandising; Operations; Parts and Service; Sales and Distribution
- Parent: Cineplex Entertainment; (2012-24); OpenGate Capital; (2024–2025); GENDA (2025–present)
- Website: www.winwithp1ag.com

Player One Amusement Group (P1AG) is a Canadian arcade game distributor. The company was first established in 2012 via the acquisition of Starburst Coin Machine by Cineplex; after subsequent acquisitions, it was renamed P1AG in 2016. Cineplex subsequently divested the company to OpenGate Capital in 2024, who in turn sold it to Genda in 2026.

== History ==
In 2007, the Mississauga-based arcade chain Playdium and arcade distributor Premier Amusements were acquired by Starburst Coin Machine. Starburst was, in turn, acquired by Canadian cinema operator Cineplex Entertainment in 2012, becoming Cineplex Starburst. After the subsequent acquisitions of Brady Distributing, Sega Amusement Works, and Tricorp Amusements, the company was rebranded as Player One Amusement Group (P1AG) in November 2016. General Manager Joe McCullagh stated that the new group would leverage the "decades of experience" of all of the companies to "put us in a better position to serve customers across North America, with a package of total solutions."

In November 2023, Cineplex announced that it had reached an agreement to sell P1AG to OpenGate Capital for $155 million; as part of the agreement, P1AG reached a long-term agreement with Cineplex to continue supplying games for its cinemas and entertainment centres. OpenGate, in turn, announced in April 2025 that it would sell P1AG to Japanese arcade operator Genda Inc..
