= Playdium =

Canadian family amusement centre chain

- Industry: Family entertainment centre
- Founded: 1996
- Number of locations: 4
- Parent: Cineplex Entertainment
- Website: playdium.com

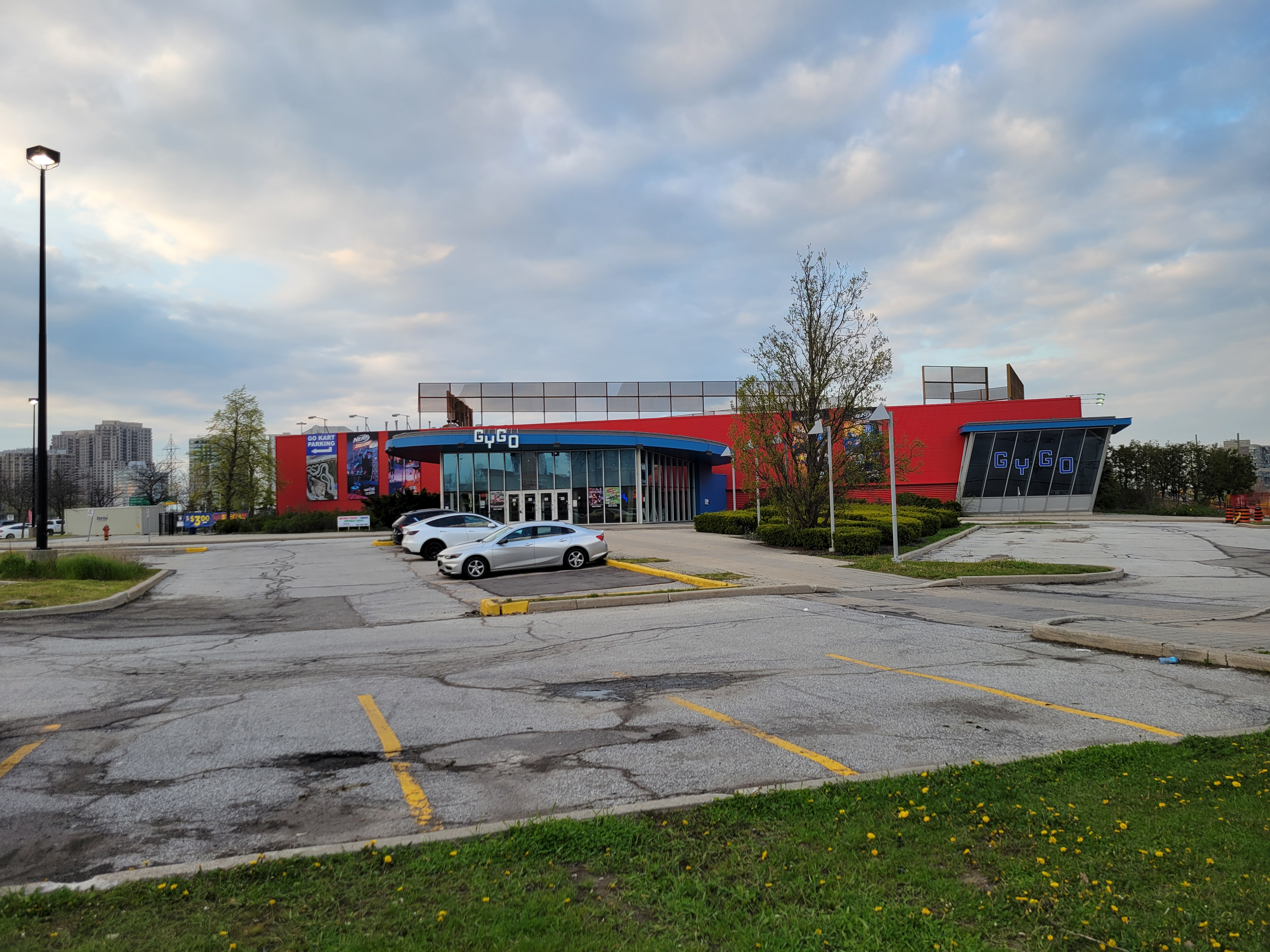
The former flagship Playdium location in Mississauga, Ontario was closed in 2020.

Playdium is a Canadian chain of family entertainment centres owned by Cineplex Entertainment. It currently consists of four locations in Ontario and Nova Scotia.

The original Playdium chain was established in 1996 in partnership with Sega and U.S. chain GameWorks; its flagship location was situated in Mississauga, Ontario, and featured an arcade, as well as other indoor and outdoor attractions. In 2019, Cineplex relaunched the Playdium brand as a family-oriented sister chain to The Rec Room, beginning with a new location in Brampton. The original location in Mississauga closed in 2020.

== History ==
Playdium first launched on September 7, 1996, opening its first location in Mississauga, Ontario, Canada as Sega City @ Playdium. It was located near the Square One Shopping Centre and served as the chain's flagship location. The 11 acres (480,000 sq ft) centre cost CA$17 million to build and included an arcade, batting cages, go-karts and mini-golf. A partnership with Sega GameWorks, it featured many arcade games from that company such as Daytona USA, and eight-player racing setups for Indy 500 (as Virtua Indy) and Manx TT Super Bike.

At its peak, the chain operated four Playdium locations: Mississauga (next to the Square One Shopping Centre), Toronto (next to Scotiabank Theatre Toronto), Edmonton (inside the West Edmonton Mall) and Burnaby (inside Metropolis at Metrotown and host of official Dance Dance Revolution tournaments in 2000 and 2001). Playdium also partnered with Famous Players to operate arcades as its cinemas, which were branded as TechTown.

In 2007, Playdium and arcade distributor Premier Amusements were acquired by Starburst Coin Machine. In turn, Starburst was acquired by Famous Players' current parent company Cineplex Entertainment in 2012, becoming Cineplex Starburst. After the subsequent acquisitions of Brady Distributing, Sega Amusement Works, and Tricorp Amusements, the company was rebranded as Player One Amusement Group (P1AG) in 2016.

That year, Cineplex began to introduce a new entertainment centre chain known as The Rec Room, a concept targeting young adults featuring restaurant and lounge areas, an auditorium area for concerts and other shows, and attractions such as an arcade, axe throwing, and bowling. In October 2017, Cineplex announced that it would relaunch the Playdium brand as a new chain of family entertainment centres, with plans to open 10 to 15 locations nationwide in medium-sized markets.

The first location opened in Brampton in September 2019, followed by a location in Whitby in November 2019. A Rec Room location opened at Square One Shopping Centre in 2019, redeveloping part of a former Target Canada store. On October 15, 2020, it was announced that the original Mississauga Playdium would permanently close on November 1 due to a redevelopment of the area. On February 20, 2021, Playdium opened its third location at Dartmouth Crossing in Dartmouth, Nova Scotia. In December 2024, Playdium opened its fourth location at Fairview Mall in Toronto.

== Operations ==
The original main building in Mississauga was 40,000 square feet (3,700 m^{2}) and included over 200 attractions. The arcade was previously curated into "communities" such as "Contact", "Music", "Speed", and "Sports", each with their own distinct theming. Play credits for games were loaded onto a Playdium card and could be purchased in units to use at any time, or in time blocks of unlimited play. Some redemption games would award digital tickets to players that could then be exchanged for prizes. A few machines could not be played using time blocks.

A baseball dome, formerly with a Toronto Blue Jays partnership, operated year-round and had nine variable-speed batting cages. There was also a Megabytes fast food restaurant on the gaming floor and a full-service mezzanine diner. Megabytes featured marketing similar to Cineplex concession stands and Outtakes restaurants, though at lower prices, while also incorporating a selection of Pizza Pizza and Starbucks menu items. Past cross-promotional partners included HMV Canada, the Toronto Blue Jays (indoor batting cages, baseball camps, and coupons on Blue Jays tickets), the Molson Indy Toronto (the 1.2 miles (1.9 km) outdoor go-kart track was formerly known as the Mario Andretti Racetrack), and Roots (the lounge was formerly known as the Roots Treehouse). The outdoors also include an 18-hole miniature golf, and Water Wars.

The current Playdium chain is a family entertainment centre concept targeting children and teens, derived from aspects of The Rec Room; it incorporates an arcade, restaurant areas, and larger-scale attractions that have included bowling, ropes courses, laser tag, and virtual reality games.

=== Playdium Movie Magic ===
Playdium Movie Magic was a DVD video rental shop that operated using automated retail kiosks. It launched in early 2011 and closed in late 2016. Competitors included Le SuperClub Vidéotron, Redbox and Zip.ca kiosks. Contrary to these, Playdium rentals were location-specific and could only be returned at the original kiosk where the DVD was rented.

== See also ==
- Cineplex Entertainment
- The Rec Room
