= Ellis Jacob =

Canadian movie theatre executive

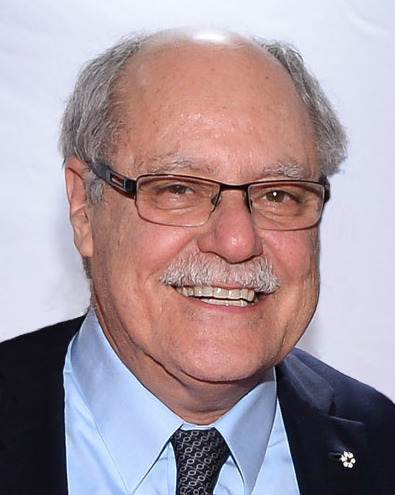
- Jacob in 2018
- Born: 1953 (age 72–73); Calcutta, West Bengal, India
- Education: McGill University; Schulich School of Business; York University
- Occupations: President and CEO of Cineplex Entertainment
- Years active: 1987-present
- Spouse: Sharyn Jacob
- Children: Lauren & Resa

Ellis Jacob CM OOnt (born 1953) is a Canadian business executive who serves as the president and chief executive officer of Cineplex Entertainment.

Since 1987, he has been involved in the movie theatre industry. He was the founder of Galaxy Entertainment Inc. in 1999 and has been the president and CEO of Cineplex Galaxy since November 2003. Under his leadership, he opened several movie theatres along with the expansion of arcades, restaurants and e-sports.

== Early life ==
Jacob was born in 1953 in Calcutta, West Bengal, to Syrian-Iraqi Jewish parents, Raymond and Tryphosa. He and his family immigrated to Canada in 1969 to attend his sister's wedding and remained there since.

== Career ==
=== Early years ===
His first career as a businessperson began at Ford Motor Company of Canada and Motorola.

=== Cineplex Odeon Corporation ===
Ellis Jacob's entry into the film exhibition business took place in October 1987 when he joined Cineplex Odeon Corporation as its chief financial officer. Under his role, he helped bring the upstart movie chain back from the brink by 1993, and was promoted to chief operating officer in 1996.

In 1998, he left Cineplex Odeon after the company merged with Loews Theatres to form Loews Cineplex Entertainment.

=== Galaxy Cinemas and Cineplex Entertainment ===
After leaving Cineplex Odeon, Jacob served as the head of integration of Alliance Atlantis who merged two companies in 1998. Shortly in October 1999, Jacob and Gerry Schwartz (CEO of Onex Corporation) founded Galaxy Cinemas with their mission to build 20 theatres in small and medium-sized cities across Canada.

On November 26, 2003, Jacob became the CEO of the newly merged Cineplex Galaxy Income Fund which consisted of Galaxy Cinemas and the Canadian assets of the restructured Loews Cineplex which brought the chains to 86. In June 2005, Cineplex Galaxy acquired Famous Players from National Amusements, under Jacob's watch, doubled its size.

Since the 2010s, Jacob began expanding several concepts beyond movie theatres such as the launch of The Rec Room and foraying into eSports and Digital Media.

After almost 40 years, it was announced on June 27, 2025 that Jacob will retire from all of his positions at Cineplex effective December 31, 2026.

== Personal life ==
Jacob is married to Sharyn, with whom he has 2 daughters named Lauren and Resa. He speaks Hindi, English, French, and many other dialects.

On March 14, 2013, Jacob opened the family theatre in his mother's honor at the Baycrest Health Sciences in North York. His mother, who died in 2010, was a resident there.

== Awards and honors ==
- Member of Order of Canada (2010)
- Member of Order of Ontario (2020)
- Board of Directors Tribute Award, 13th Canadian Screen Awards (2025)
