= Scotiabank Theatre Toronto =

Cinema in Toronto, Ontario, Canada

Coordinates: 43.648622°N 79.391241°W

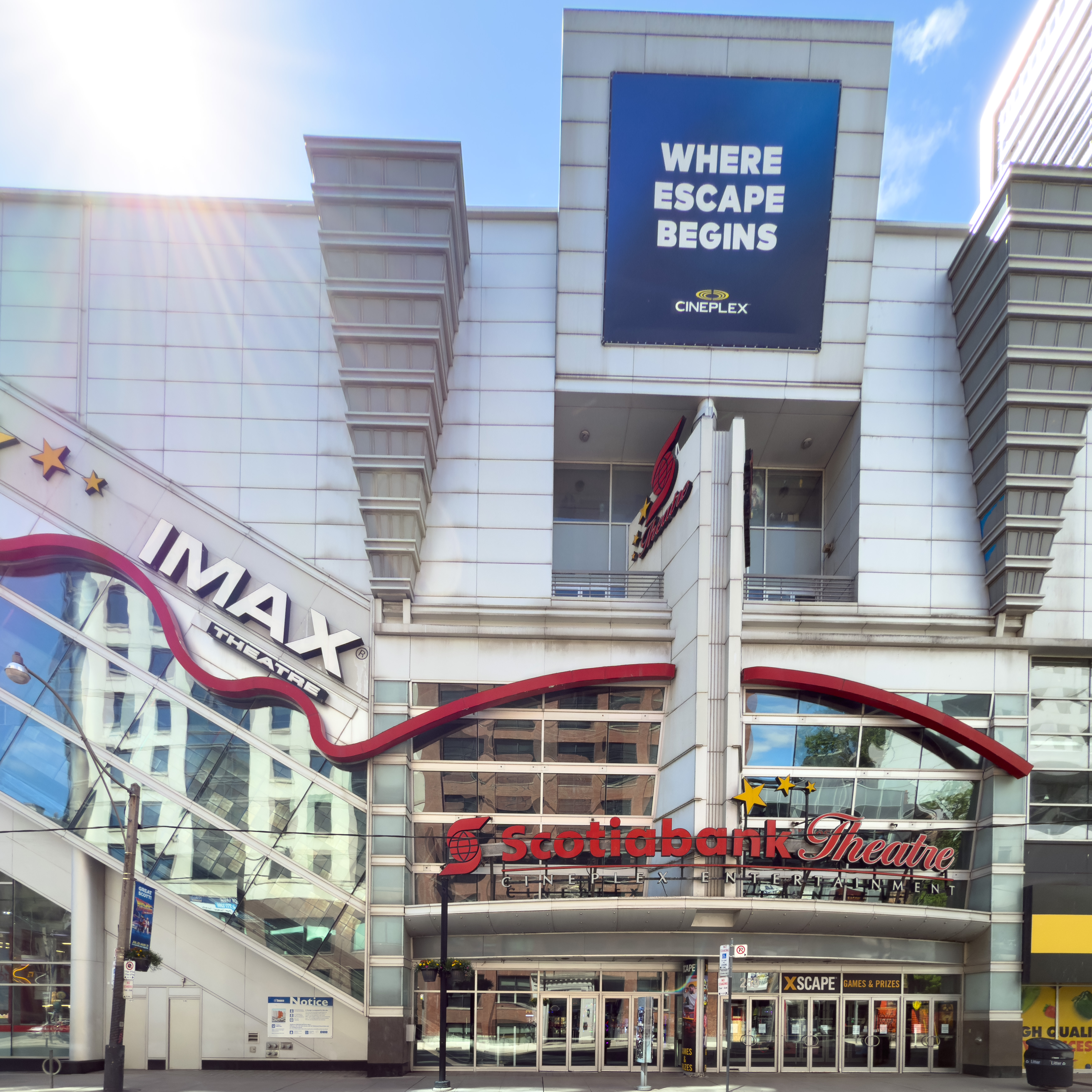
- The theatre's main entrance

- Location of Scotiabank Theatre in Toronto
- Former names: Paramount Theatre (1999-2007)
- Location: 259 Richmond Street West; Toronto, Ontario; M5V 3M6
- Owner: RioCan
- Operator: National Amusements (1998–2005); Cineplex Entertainment (2005–present) (Famous Players Limited Partnership)
- Seating type: Stadium seating
- Capacity: 4500 seats
- Public transit: Osgoode station

Construction
- Groundbreaking: 1997
- Opened: May 19, 1999; 27 years ago
- Architect: Michael Kirkland

Website
- Website

The Scotiabank Theatre Toronto (formerly Paramount Theatre Toronto) is a major movie theatre at the RioCan Hall in the Entertainment District of downtown Toronto, Ontario, Canada at Richmond and John Street. Opened in 1999, and currently owned by Cineplex Entertainment, the venue screens theatrical films throughout the year, but is best known as one of the major venues for the annual Toronto International Film Festival alongside the nearby TIFF Lightbox.

== Description ==
Scotiabank Theatre Toronto has a total of 14 auditoriums, including one with an IMAX screen, six with 3D screen, one UltraAVX auditorium with D-Box and a ScreenX auditorium. The auditoriums and amenities are located on the third floor of the complex, accessed by escalator and elevator, though the escalator is often out of service. The box office and the theatre entrance is located on Richmond Street West. The box office and escalator areas were decorated with large spaceships from the Star Trek series of films, but the ships were removed and disposed of in August 2018.

== History ==
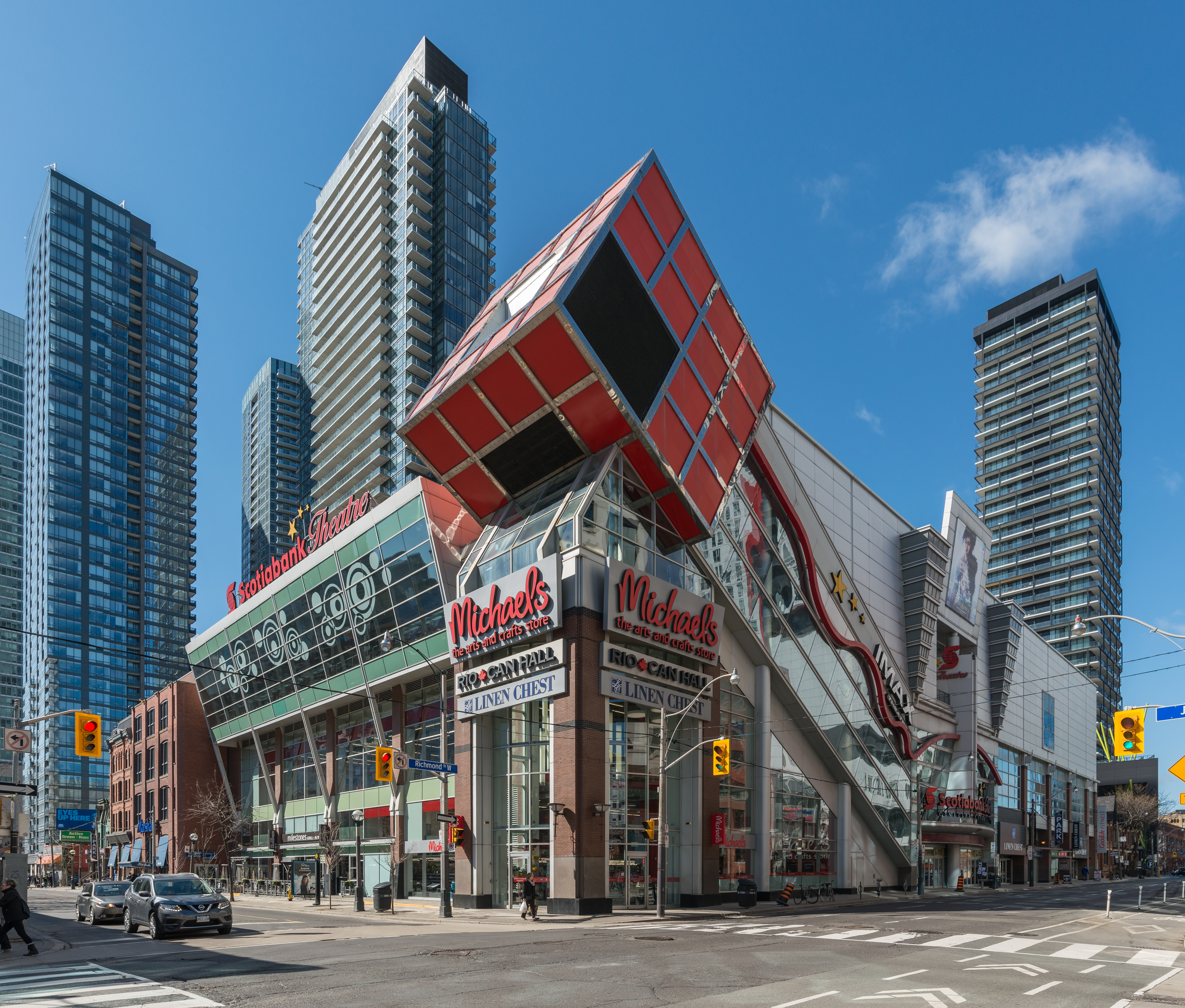
The theatre's RioCan Hall complex in 2017

The theatre opened on May 19, 1999, as the Paramount Theatre Toronto with the release of Star Wars: Episode I – The Phantom Menace. The multiplex opened with 14 screens and 4,500 seats, and Toronto's first 3-D IMAX screen.

The theatre was built as part of the CA$$70 million RioCan Hall complex (formerly Festival Hall); planning for the complex and theatre started in 1994. The RioCan Hall also contains a Milestones Grill and Bar, а Marshalls store, and a No Frills. Until May 2014, the space housed a flagship Chapters store. From October 2007 until early 2010, the hall also housed CiRCA nightclub. Before CiRCA, the first tenant was the Playdium family entertainment centre. Though the nightclub and entertainment centre are now closed, Playdium also opened a smaller TechTown arcade in the movie theatre, which remains operational to this day as a Cinescape arcade.

In 2005, Viacom sold Famous Players to Cinema Galaxy Income Fund — owner of Cineplex Galaxy Cinemas — creating the company Cineplex Entertainment. As it did not hold rights to the Paramount Pictures brand, the Paramount Theatre chain was rebranded as "Scotiabank Theatre" in 2007: the rebranding was part of an agreement between Cineplex and Scotiabank that saw the companies also launch the Scene loyalty program.

The theatre hosts the Toronto After Dark Film Festival annually. The festival moved to the Scotiabank Theatre in 2013. The festival is a showcase of horror, sci-fi, action and cult cinema.

The venue opened with a film-based IMAX 3D projector. In recent years, this was replaced to feature an IMAX with Laser projector instead. The laser projection system was the first in Canada and one of two in North America. In December 2010, one of the screens was upgraded to Cineplex's premium large format UltraAVX. This screen is about 1.32 times larger than a regular movie screen. Later, this auditorium had D-Box motion seats installed as an optional upgrade. Another auditorium was converted to the Barco Escape premium large format in July 2016, as one of three Cineplex locations to add the format. Star Trek Beyond was the first film played in this auditorium, with 20 minutes of the film being optimized for this format.

In November 2017, an IMAX VR virtual reality centre opened at Scotiabank Theatre Toronto, as the pilot program's first location in Canada. The centre included several cubicles offering access to VR games and experiences, using either HTC Vive or StarVR hardware. In December 2018, IMAX announced that it would be shuttering the IMAX VR project and closing all remaining locations in early-2019.

In April 2019, RioCan submitted a proposal to the city proposing the redevelopment of the RioCan Hall property containing the Scotiabank Theatre Toronto, which would be replaced by a mixed-use development incorporating condominium towers with retail, office, and residential space. The proposal specified that the new development would include a theatre. As of 2024, the project has not yet gone forward, while a Cineplex spokesperson told The Hollywood Reporter that "while there are conversations around re-development of the site, these are long-term plans and it's business as usual at Scotiabank Theatre Toronto".
