= Cineplex Entertainment =

Canadian entertainment company

Cineplex Inc.
- Formerly: Galaxy Entertainment (1999–2003); Cineplex Galaxy (2003–2005); Cineplex Galaxy Income Fund (2003–2011)
- Type: Public
- Traded as: TSX: CGX; TSX: CGX.DB; S&P/TSX Composite Component
- Industry: Film exhibitor; Digital advertising
- Predecessors: Loews Cineplex Entertainment (Cineplex Odeon Corporation); Famous Players; AMC Theatres (4 Canadian locations); Empire Theatres
- Founded: October 4, 1999; 27 years ago (Galaxy Entertainment); November 26, 2003; 22 years ago (Cineplex-Galaxy)
- Founder: Gerry Schwartz, Ellis Jacob and Stephen Brown
- Headquarters: 1303 Yonge Street; Toronto, Ontario; M4T 2Y9
- Number of locations: Theatres: 158; Screens: 1,631
- Area served: Canada
- Products: Movie theatres; Restaurants; Arcades
- Brands: Theatres: Cinema City; Cineplex Cinemas; Cineplex Junxion; Cineplex Odeon; Cineplex VIP Cinemas; Famous Players; Fifth Avenue Cinemas; Galaxy Cinemas; Scotiabank Theatre; SilverCity / StarCité; Formats: UltraAVX; Memberships: CineClub; Scene+ (via Scene IP)
- Revenue: ▲CA$656.66 million (2021)
- Operating income: ▼ –CA$84.29 million (2021)
- Net income: ▲ –CA$248.72 million (2021)
- Total assets: ▼CA$2.11 billion (2021)
- Total equity: ▼ –CA$219.72 million (2021)
- Number of employees: Over 13,000 (2019)
- Subsidiaries: Cineplex Entertainment Corporation; Cineplex Entertainment LP; Famous Players Co.; Famous Players LP; Galaxy Entertainment Inc.; Scene+ entities (33.3%); Scene IP Corporation (50%)
- Website: cineplex.com

Cineplex Inc. (formerly Cineplex Entertainment and Cineplex Galaxy) is a Canadian Entertainment and Media Company that operates movie theatre and family entertainment centres, headquartered in Toronto. It is the largest cinema chain in Canada; as of 2019, it operated 165 locations, and accounted for 75% of the domestic box office.

The company was formed in 2003 via the acquisition of Loews Cineplex's Canadian operations (which included the assets of the former Cineplex Odeon chain) by Onex Corporation and Oaktree Capital Management, and its subsequent merger with Onex's Galaxy Entertainment—a chain of cinemas that was established in 1999 by former Cineplex Odeon executives, and operated primarily in smaller markets. The company subsequently acquired Famous Players from National Amusements in 2005, went public in 2011, and acquired Empire Theatres' operations in Atlantic Canada and parts of Ontario in 2013. In December 2019, Cineplex agreed to be acquired by British exhibitor Cineworld Group for $2.8 billion, pending regulatory and shareholder approval, but Cineworld abandoned the sale in June 2020 due to unspecified breaches of the sale terms.

The company operates cinemas across Canada, primarily under the brand Cineplex Cinemas. Some flagship locations operate as Scotiabank Theatre, while some locations use brands carried over from its corporate predecessors (such as Famous Players, SilverCity, Odeon, and Galaxy, although some of them have since been converted to the Cineplex banner). The company also owns family entertainment centres under the brands The Rec Room and Playdium, the rewards loyalty program Scene+ (in partnership with Scotiabank and the Empire Company), the e-commerce Cineplex Store, film distributor Cineplex Pictures and the digital advertising business Cineplex Media. They also feature IMAX theatres across Canada.

== History ==
=== 1912–1998: predecessors ===
Cineplex stakes a partial claim to the history of the Famous Players Film Company (later Paramount Pictures), founded in 1912 by Adolph Zukor, as Cineplex's earliest predecessor; however, that company did not have any operations in Canada until 1920, when it bought Nathan Nathanson's Paramount Theatre chain, which Nathanson had established four years earlier. (Note: The Canadian "Paramount Theatre" chain was not affiliated with the American chain with the same name.) Nathanson, the 5th richest person in the world, became the first president of the resulting entity, Famous Player Canadian Corporation. In 1923, Famous Players bought out rival Allen Theatres, acquiring many buildings in the process.

Odeon Theatres of Canada was established in 1941, before merging with the Canadian Theatres chain in 1978, becoming Canadian Odeon Theatres.

In 1979, Garth Drabinsky and Nat Taylor created the Cineplex Corporation and opened its first "Cineplex" theatre complex, in the Toronto Eaton Centre. Odeon merged with Cineplex in 1984 to form Cineplex Odeon Corporation, before being acquired by Loews Theatres in 1998, thereby becoming Loews Cineplex Entertainment.

=== 1999–2004: early years ===
Cineplex Galaxy logo used from 2003 to 2005

Galaxy Entertainment Inc. was established in 1999 by Ellis Jacob, a former chief operating officer of Loews Cineplex Entertainment, and Stephen Brown, a former Cineplex chief financial officer. With investments from Onex Corporation and Famous Players, the new company focused on smaller markets that were usually served by smaller theatres and old equipment, opening large, major chain-style locations under the Galaxy Cinemas banner. By 2003, Galaxy Entertainment had grown to 19 theatres and $75 million in box office revenue.

In 2001, Loews Cineplex Entertainment (a 1998 merger of Universal Pictures' Cineplex Odeon and Sony's Loews Theatres) underwent bankruptcy due to the economic recession of the early 2000s. In June 2001, Onex Corporation announced its intent to acquire Loews Cineplex; as part of the deal, Loews Cineplex would close 46 cinemas (including 25 in Canada), and Onex would acquire the company for $1.3 billion with Oaktree Capital Management as a partner.

In November 2003, Loews Cineplex Entertainment's Canadian operations merged with Galaxy Entertainment as Cineplex Galaxy Income Fund. The U.S. operations of Loews Cineplex were divested in 2004 to several investors including The Carlyle Group.

=== 2005–2012: purchase of Famous Players, Cineplex Entertainment ===
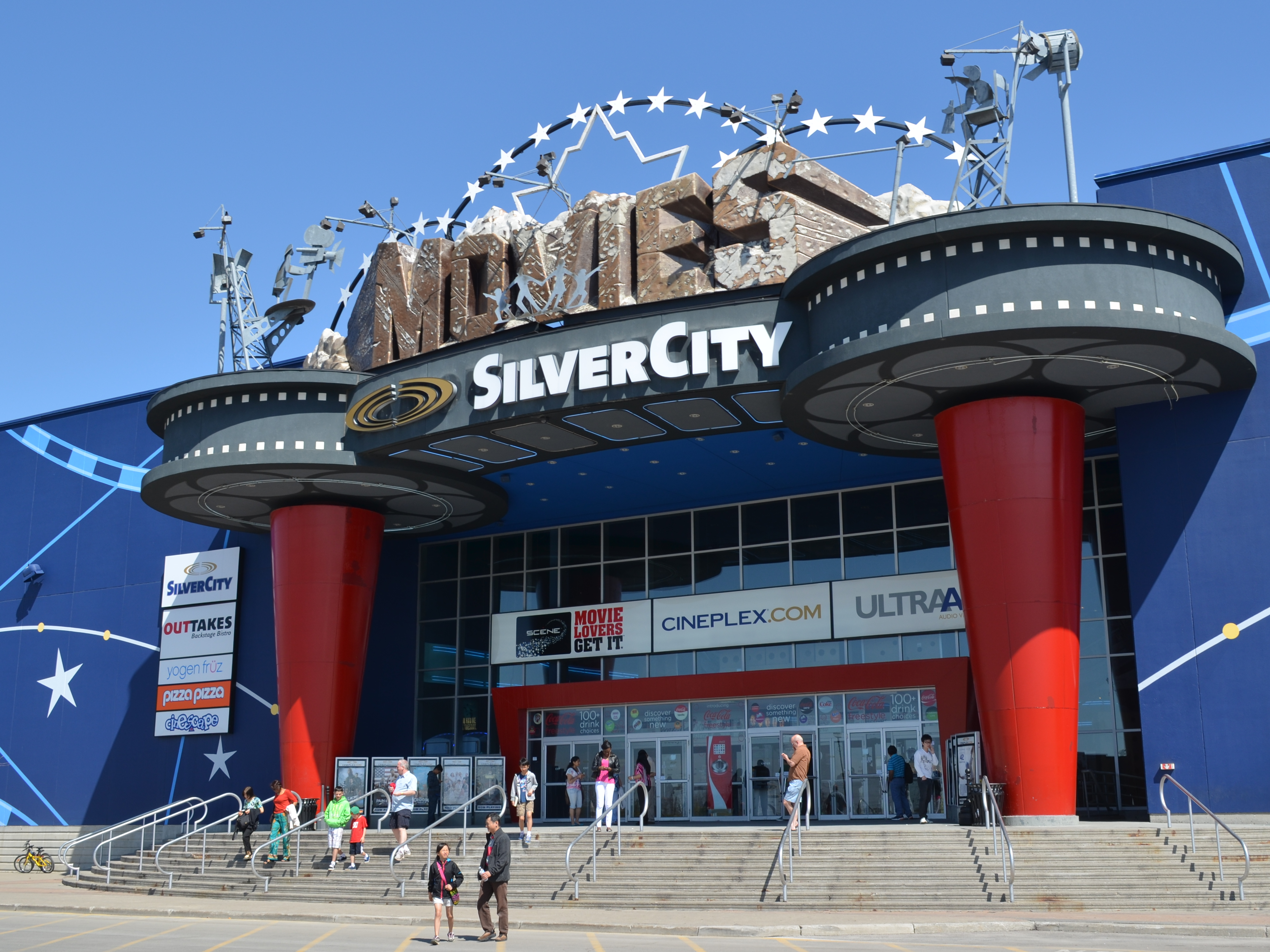
SilverCity Richmond Hill Cinemas

On June 13, 2005, Cineplex Galaxy Income Fund announced its acquisition of Famous Players from Viacom for CA$500 million (about US$397 million). This deal was completed on July 22, 2005. To satisfy antitrust concerns, on August 22, 2005, the group announced the sale of 27 locations in Ontario and western Canada to Empire Theatres. On June 21, Loews Cineplex announced that it would merge with AMC Theatres. While AMC Theatres also operated in Canada and was ranked third behind Cineplex Galaxy and the enlarged Empire Theatres, Cineplex Odeon and AMC Theatres remained competitors.

In October 2005, Cineplex Galaxy changed the name of its operating subsidiary Cineplex Galaxy LP to Cineplex Entertainment LP, to reflect their expanded operations. On March 31, 2006, Cineplex sold seven more theatres in Quebec to Chelsea-based Fortune Cinemas. On June 29, 2007, Cineplex Entertainment announced its purchase of three Cinema City theatres in western Canada, consisting of two theatres in Winnipeg and one in Edmonton.

As Cineplex no longer held the rights to the branding, the Paramount Theatres locations were rebranded as Scotiabank Theatre as part of a joint venture with Scotiabank to launch a new loyalty program.

With the bankruptcy of Fortune Cinemas, Cineplex Entertainment acquired (or in this case, re-acquired) some of Fortune Cinemas theatres. The Starcité Gatineau (Starcité Hull) and the Cavendish theatres were reopened as Cineplex Entertainment theatres.

In June 2012, as part of its exit from the Canadian market, AMC sold four of its Canadian cinemas to Cineplex, including the Yonge Dundas 24 at 10 Dundas East (Cineplex's original location and namesake), and the Forum in Montreal. The company also earlier acquired the Tinseltown Movies 12 theatre from another American chain, Cinemark, in the Gastown neighbourhood of Vancouver.

Over the subsequent years, Cineplex expanded into advertising, events programming and a new concept, The Rec Room, amusement venues with live entertainment that serve food and drink.

=== 2013–2018: expansion, VIP Cinemas ===
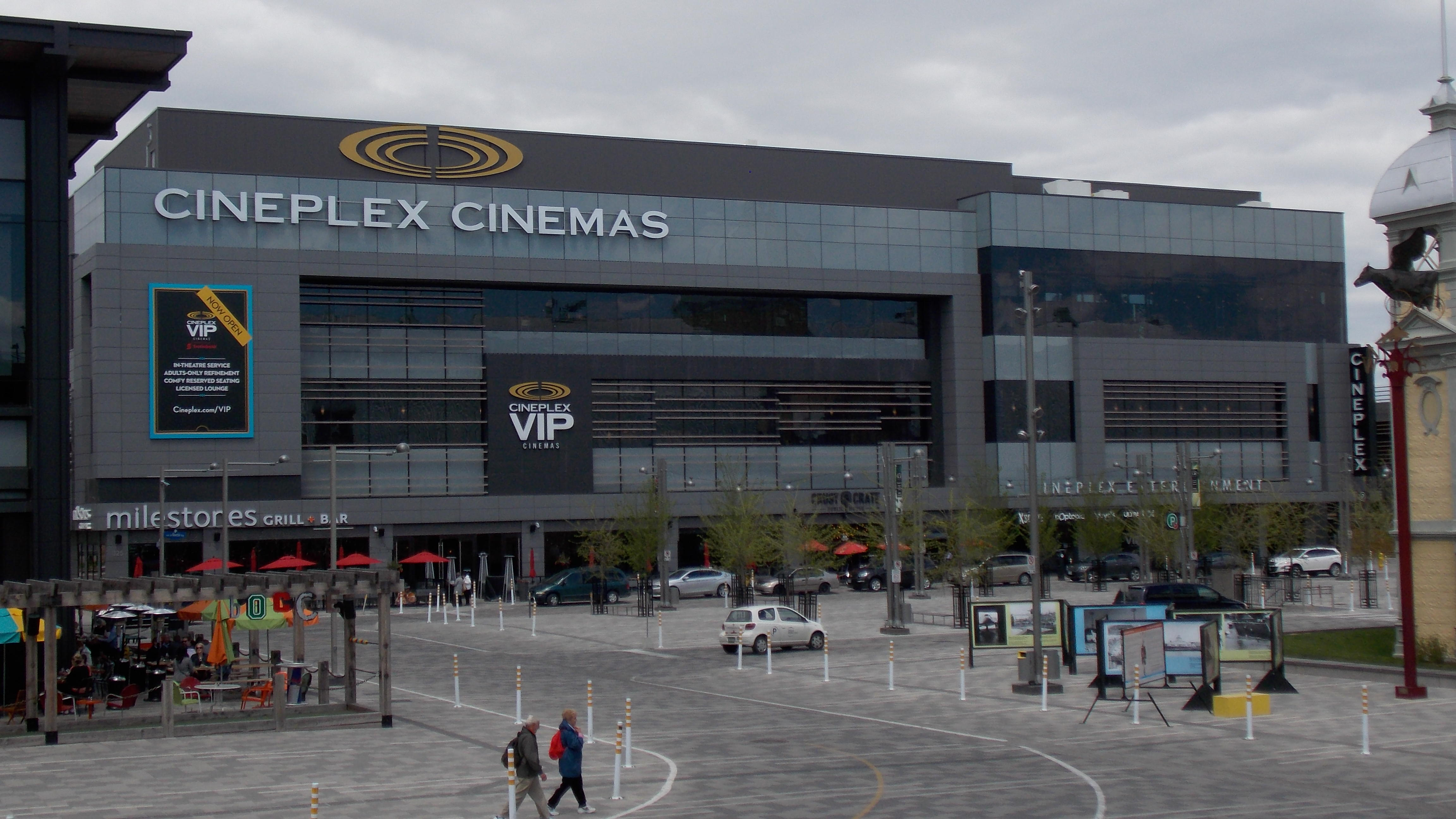
Cineplex Cinemas Lansdowne & VIP in Ottawa opened in 2015.

In the 2010s, Cineplex began to deploy "VIP Cinemas" featuring reclining seats, in-seat meal services, and a licensed lounge. On August 15, 2014, Cineplex opened a dedicated VIP Cinemas Don Mills location, the first to be devoted solely to the format. By 2017, the company had also begun to retrofit selected non-VIP auditoriums to feature reclining seating.

On June 27, 2013, the Empire Company announced that it would divest its Empire Theatres operations in order to focus on its real-estate assets and grocery chain Sobeys. Cineplex acquired 24 former Empire locations in the Atlantic provinces as well as 2 in Ontario, for around $200 million (Landmark Cinemas acquired the remainder, predominantly in Western Canada and Ontario). In February 2014, Cineplex announced that it had acquired Empire's planned Lansdowne Park location in Ottawa, and would construct a new 10-screen cinema at the site with three VIP screens.

=== 2019–2025: attempted acquisition by Cineworld ===
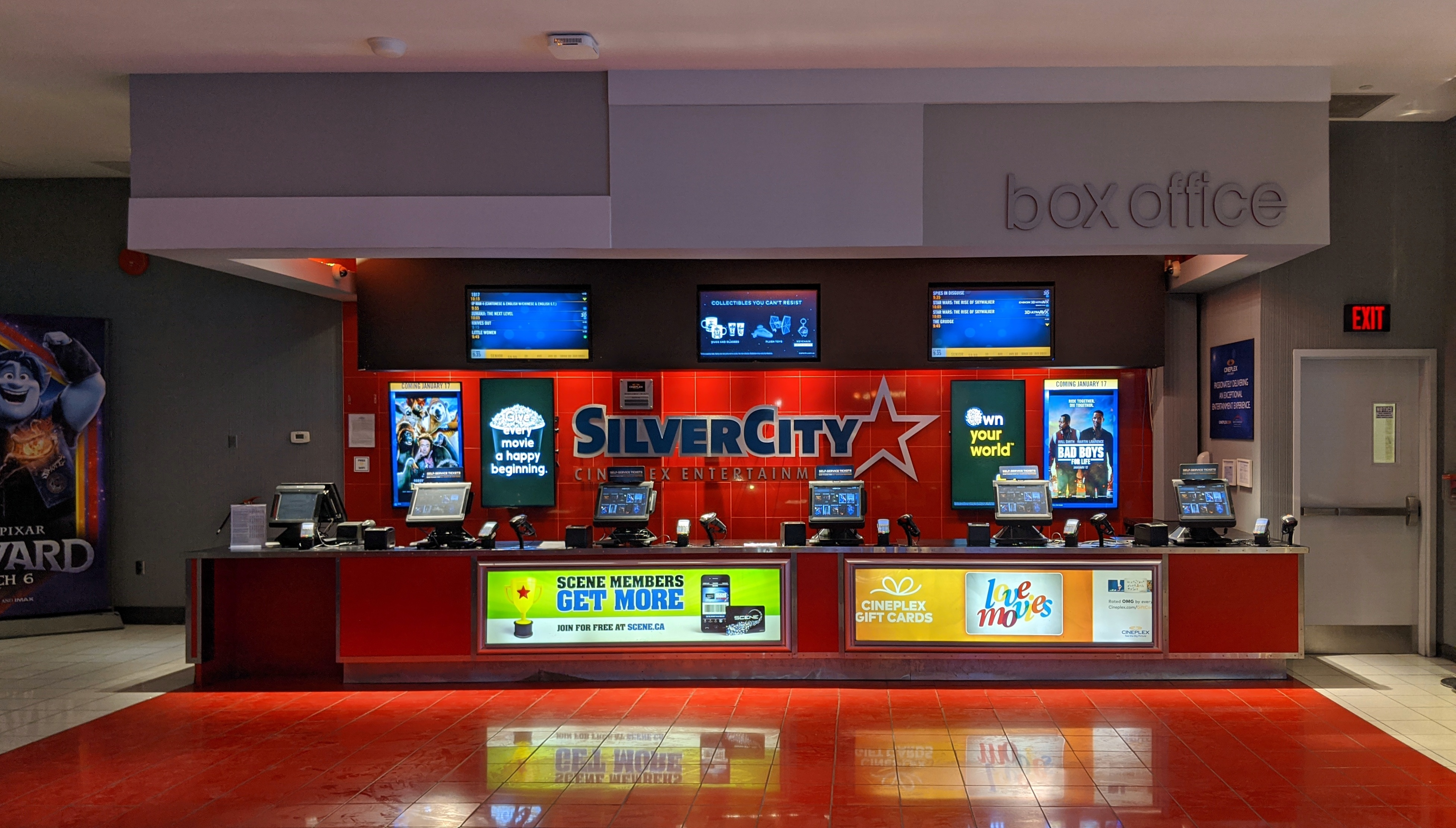
Ticket kiosks at Cineplex Fairview Mall (formerly SilverCity)

On December 16, 2019, Cineplex announced a definitive agreement to be acquired by the British cinema operator Cineworld Group, the second-largest film exhibitor worldwide, pending shareholder and regulatory approval. Cineworld would be paying $34 per-share—a 42% premium over Cineplex's share price prior to the announcement, valuing the company at CDN$2.8 billion. Cineworld planned to pay US$1.65 billion, and to fund the remainder by taking on debt.

Combined with its ownership of the 564-location Regal Cinemas chain in the United States (which it had acquired the previous year), the sale would have made Cineworld the largest cinema chain in North America. Cineworld stated that it planned to integrate Cineplex's operations with those of Regal, while maintaining Cineplex's banners for its Canadian operations. The company also stated that it planned to reach $120 million in cost efficiencies and revenue synergies (including the adoption of a subscription service scheme similar to Regal and Cineworld) by the end of fiscal year 2020.

The sale was approved by Cineplex shareholders in February 2020. Activist shareholder Bluebell Capital Partners called for the Canadian government to block the sale due to the COVID-19 pandemic, which in turn led to the temporary closure of all Cineplex properties for several months starting on March 16. In May, Cineplex stated that Cineworld planned to complete the sale by June 2020, provided that it received federal approval under the Investment Canada Act, and that it met the terms of the sale agreement (including its debt not exceeding $725 million).

On June 12, 2020, Cineworld abandoned the purchase, alleging that Cineplex had engaged in conduct that breached unspecified terms of the sale, and that the company had experienced a "material adverse effect" of an unspecified nature. Cineplex denied the claims and made counter-allegations. The agreement with Cineworld included a condition that the latter would pay a penalty in case it decided to cancel the deal. In February 2021, CEO Ellis Jacob offered to temporarily convert Cineplex facilities into COVID-19 vaccination sites. In July, Cineplex started legal action against Cineworld claiming financial damages, and Cineworld counter-sued.

In December 2021, the Ontario Superior Court of Justice ruled in favour of Cineplex, and ordered Cineworld to pay US$1 billion in damages for breach of contract. The company planned to appeal the ruling; Cineworld's shares fell by 40% in the immediate aftermath of the ruling. In September 2022, it was reported that the United States Bankruptcy Court for the Southern District of New York blocked the Canadian appeal due to Cineworld's Chapter 11 bankruptcy. It was also reported by The Wall Street Journal that Cineplex was exploring the possibility of a separate merger with Regal.

Due to Cineworld's bankruptcy, Cineplex never received the damages owed by the company, which harmed the company's financial standing. Cineplex Inc. sold its arcade distribution venture Player One Amusement Group to OpenGate Capital, and sold its Cineplex Store division to Swiss company CosmoBlue Media in April 2025.

=== 2026–present: New leadership and possible sale ===
On September 23, 2026, former Landmark Cinemas CEO Bill Walker was introduced as the company's new CEO. Concurrently, it was announced that Cineplex's board of directors would explore strategic alternatives that could result in the sale of the company, with Goldman Sachs and TD Securities brought on as co-advisors, and former CEO Ellis Jacob remaining in an advisory role during the review. Cineplex stated that its current market valuation "may not fully reflect the strength of its business and long-term prospects."

== Operations ==
=== Theatre chains ===
Cineplex Entertainment operates 152 theatres as of Q2 2026. These locations use several brand names:

- Cineplex Cinemas and Cineplex Odeon (92 locations combined)
  - Cineplex VIP Cinemas (4 standalone locations)
- Cineplex Junxion (2 locations)
- Cinema City (1 location)
- Famous Players (2 locations)
- Fifth Avenue Cinemas (19+) (1 location)
- Galaxy Cinemas (30 locations)
- Scotiabank Theatre (10 locations)
- SilverCity and StarCité (14 locations combined)

Cineplex Cinemas (French: Cinémas Cineplex) is the company's main banner. Many locations use the older Cineplex Odeon branding, but otherwise operate in the same manner. Among the two brands, 24 locations also feature VIP Cinemas. The Galaxy Cinemas brand is primarily used by small and medium-market locations, although some have since been converted to the Cineplex Cinemas banner.

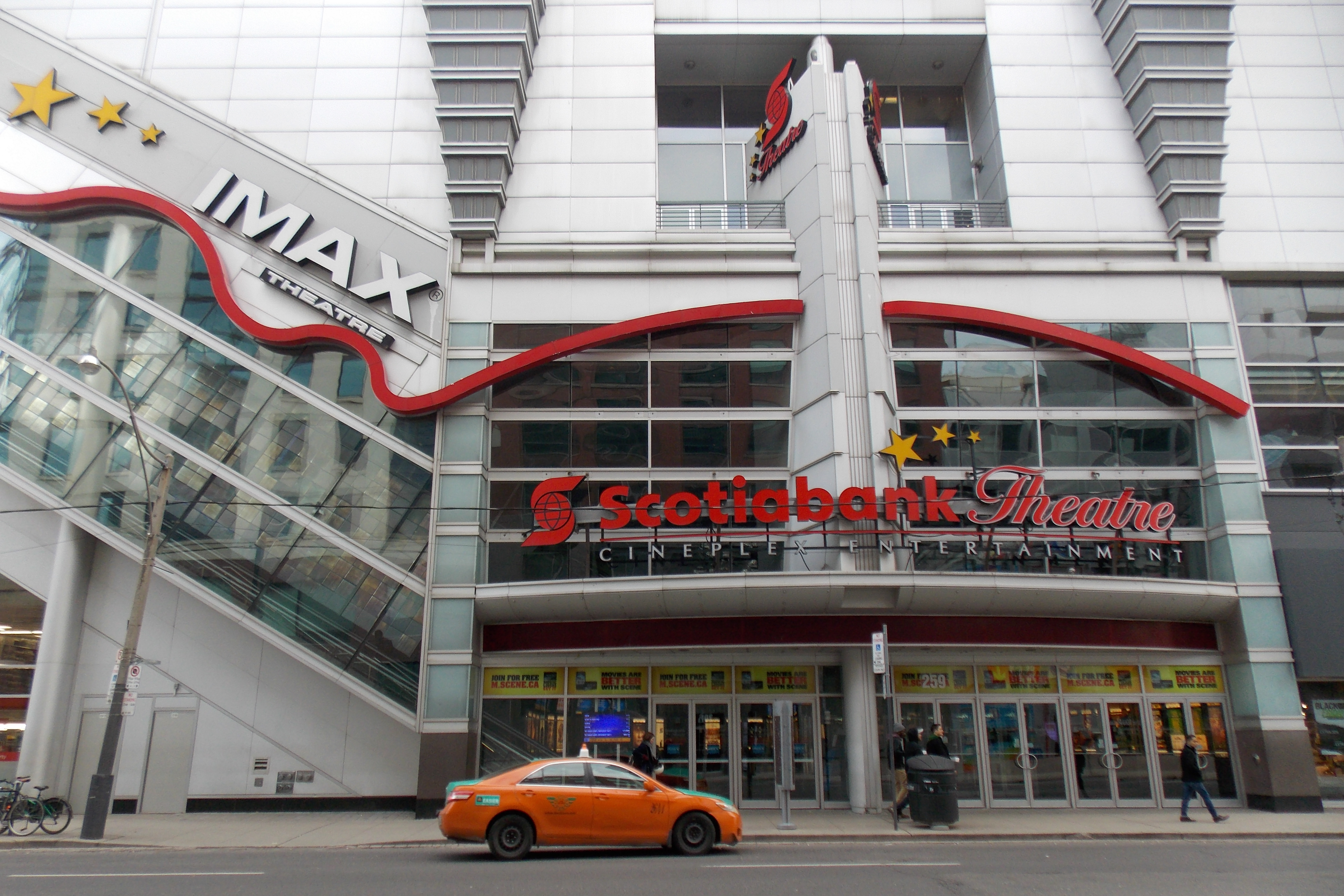
The exterior of the Scotiabank Theatre Toronto.

Cineplex Junxion is used for two locations which opened at Kildonan Place in Winnipeg in December 2022 (replacing the existing Famous Players location) and Erin Mills Town Centre in Mississauga opened in May 2023. These are larger-scale locations with an increased focus on entertainment and social spaces, including a larger arcade, a restaurant and bar, and a performance area in addition to cinemas.

The Scotiabank Theatre (French: Cinéma Banque Scotia) banner is used for Cineplex's flagship locations in major markets. It was first introduced in 2007 after Cineplex's acquisition of Famous Players, with the brand primarily replacing its Paramount Theatres banner in Toronto, Calgary, Montreal, and Vancouver, and also being applied to the SilverCity West Edmonton Mall cinema. The banner's naming rights are held by Scotiabank, as part of the company's partnership with Cineplex on the Scene rewards program. Other Cineplex-owned theatres have since been converted to the Scotiabank Theatre banner as well, including locations in Saskatoon (formerly Galaxy), St. John's and Halifax (formerly Empire), and Ottawa and Winnipeg (formerly SilverCity).

The SilverCity, StarCité, and Famous Players banners originated from Famous Players are still used by some locations. However, many former Famous Players and SilverCity locations have been replaced by Cineplex Cinemas. This is also true for the Coliseum (French: Colisée) and Colossus brands, although these brands' unique architectural features have been preserved.

The Cinema City brand is used at one location in Winnipeg's Garden City area that predominantly shows second-run films. In 2011, Cineplex announced that the Cinema City McGillivray in Winnipeg would be closed and renovated into a Cineplex Odeon and VIP Cinemas location. The Cinema City Movies 12 in Edmonton closed on January 8, 2023.

Other acquisitions from Cineplex include the Beach Cinemas from Alliance Cinemas, which was rebranded to Cineplex Cinemas Beaches and later closed in . In 2013, Cineplex acquired two Festival Cinemas locations, Fifth Avenue Cinemas and the Park Theatre, that were previously owned by Alliance. The Fifth Avenue location operates similarly to a VIP Cinemas location and retains its original name. The Park Theatre was closed by Cineplex in October 2025 and was reopened as an independent theatre.

=== Premium formats ===
Selected Cineplex locations offer including large-screen formats, motion seats, and VIP for a higher ticket price. Following the premiere of Star Wars: The Force Awakens in 2015, Cineplex reported that at least 80% of customers watched the film with one of its premium formats, and 40% of the company's overall box office revenue came from premium formats.

- VIP Cinemas are a premium concept catering to adults, which debuted around 1998 at the Varsity location. The concept features a VIP Lounge area with a licensed bar, while the cinemas offer reserved seating, leather reclining seats with tables, and in-seat meal services offering snacks and other premium menu options. Access to VIP Cinemas are restricted by the legal drinking age; depending on local laws, some locations also allow consumption of alcoholic beverages inside the auditorium. VIP Cinemas are offered at selected locations, and Cineplex has also constructed some locations devoted exclusively to VIP Cinemas.
- Prime Seats are reserved seating rows in selected auditoriums, near the middle of the audience. They were first piloted in Ontario in 2014, before being introduced to other Cineplex markets.
- IMAX digital screens are available at 29 locations as of June 2026. While most of these were acquired from other theatre chains, Cineplex opened several of its own digital IMAX screens, with the most recent being in Moncton in 2024. The screen size is from about 73 to 119 feet diagonally, depending on the venue. Among the Cineplex locations, Scotiabank Theatre Toronto is the only one that offers IMAX with Laser projections.
  - IMAX 70 mm film screenings are available at eight locations as of June 2026. These locations, along with the Saskatchewan Science Centre in Regina, Saskatchewan, are the only locations in Canada to screen the Christopher Nolan film The Odyssey in the IMAX 70 mm format. With the exception of Montreal, Halifax and Riverport, these locations have also screened Nolan's films Dunkirk and Oppenheimer in IMAX 70 mm. Locations with film screenings include:

- Cinéma Banque Scotia Montréal
- Cineplex Cinemas Langley (formerly Colossus)
- Cineplex Cinemas Mississauga (formerly Coliseum)
- Cineplex Cinemas Vaughan (formerly Colossus)

- Scotiabank Theatre Chinook (Calgary)
- Scotiabank Theatre Edmonton (formerly SilverCity)
- Scotiabank Theatre Halifax (formerly Empire Theatres)
- SilverCity Riverport Cinemas, Richmond

- ScreenX features a 270-degree panoramic screen, and is available at 15 locations.
  - Cineplex previously offered Barco Escape, a similar panoramic format, at several locations. This format premiered in Canada on July 22, 2016, with Star Trek Beyond, featuring 20 minutes of the film optimised for this format.
- UltraAVX is Cineplex's in-house premium large format, referring to auditoriums with larger "wall-to-wall" screens and 4K projectors, Dolby Atmos surround sound, and reserved seating. Several UltraAVX auditoriums also feature a ScreenX panoramic screen or optional D-Box motion seating.
- D-Box seats are available at selected locations, which offer motion effects synchronized with the film.
- 4DX, a 4D film format, first launched at Cineplex Cinemas Yonge-Dundas on November 4, 2016. It debuted alongside the premiere of Doctor Strange as Canada's first cinema screen to feature the technology. 4DX includes stereoscopic 3D, as well as seat motion and other practical effects such as wind, strobes, and smell among others. A second 4DX screen opened at Scotiabank Theatre Chinook Centre Calgary in August 2019.
- Clubhouse is an auditorium concept designed primarily for children, featuring family films, multicoloured seats and a play structure.

=== Arcades and amusement ===
Arcades at Cineplex locations are primarily operated under the branding Xscape Entertainment Centre; the brand was first introduced in June 2009, and has since been deployed at 83 locations as of September 2024. Early Xscape locations (such as SilverCity CrossIron Mills near Calgary) were designed as distinct areas with party rooms and a licensed bar, but later builds have since been designed as redemption-oriented refurbishments and conversions of existing space. In 2017, Cineplex began to expand the Xscape brand internationally, beginning with two standalone Xscape arcades at the Mall of America in Bloomington, Minnesota.

In January 2015, Cineplex announced The Rec Room, an entertainment restaurant chain similar to the U.S.-based chain Dave & Buster's. The Rec Room targets a young adult demographic, with its locations featuring restaurants and bars, arcade and recreational game areas, simulators, and an auditorium equipped with a cinema-style screen. Cineplex CEO Ellis Jacob explained that the chain is meant to help the company diversify beyond its core cinema business in the wake of the growing streaming industry, The first location opened in Edmonton, Alberta on September 19, 2016, at the South Edmonton Common. A second location in Toronto, Ontario at Roundhouse Park opened in June 2017, followed by a third location at the West Edmonton Mall.

Cineplex owns Playdium, an arcade and family entertainment centre chain focused on children and teens. The chain first launched in 1996 in Mississauga, Ontario. In 1997, Playdium partnered with Famous Players to operate arcades at its locations under the brand TechTown. It expanded to four locations by June 1999, including Toronto, Edmonton and Burnaby. The Toronto location closed in 2002, and by the end of 2004, only the Mississauga location remained, which permanently closed on November 1, 2020. The chain was relaunched in 2019 with a concept patterned after The Rec Room, beginning with two Ontario locations in Brampton (replacing the Cineplex Odeon Orion Gate theatre) and Whitby. A third Playdium location opened in Dartmouth, Nova Scotia in 2021, followed by Fairview Mall in Toronto in 2024.

==== Virtual reality ====
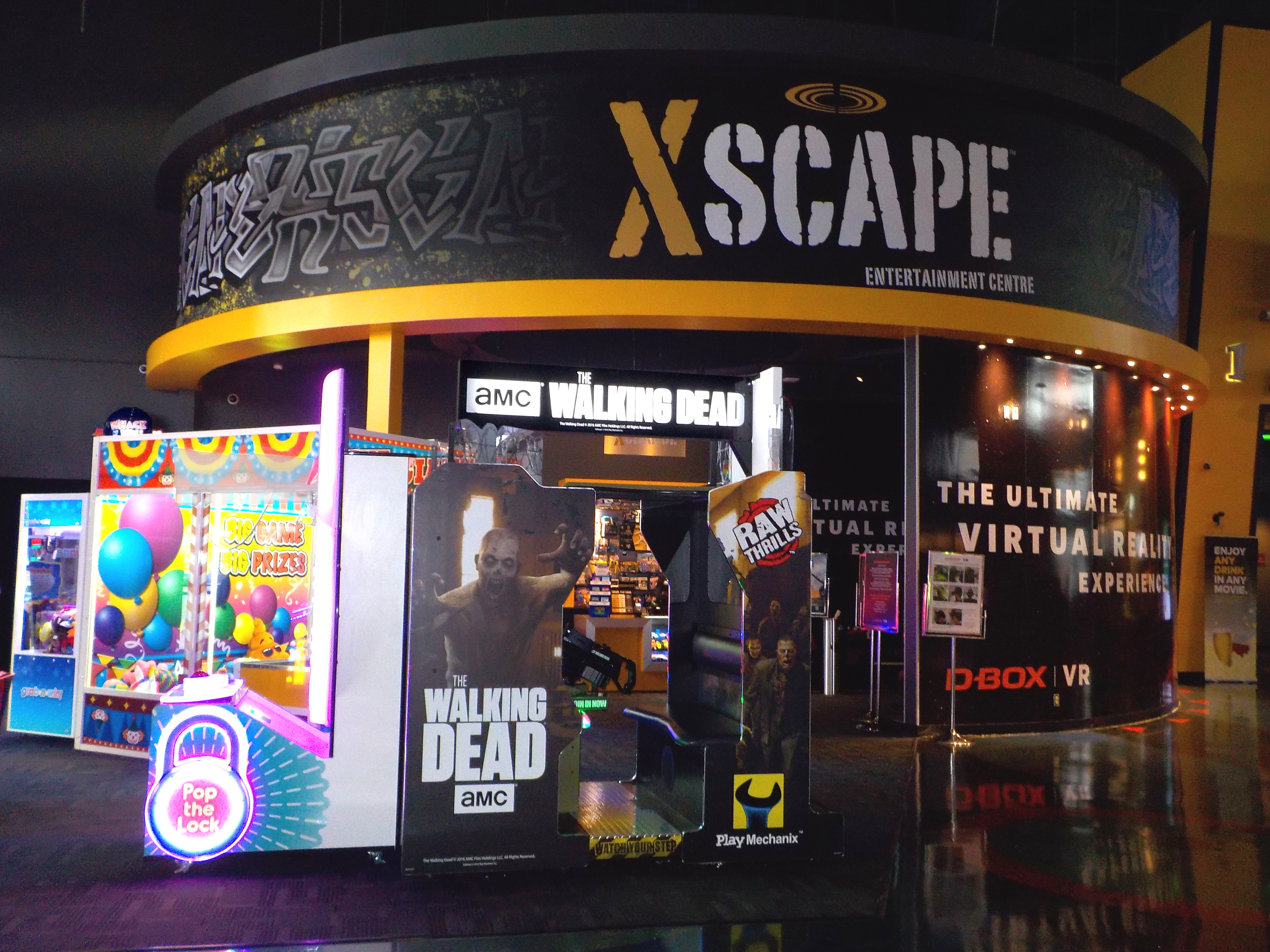
D-Box VR theatre at Xscape in Scotiabank Theatre Ottawa

In November 2017, an IMAX VR centre opened at Scotiabank Theatre Toronto as IMAX VR's first location in Canada. The following month, a D-Box VR experience launched at the Ottawa location. The IMAX VR centre closed in 2019, as part of the discontinuation of the IMAX VR pilot project.

In July 2018, after having opened such an attraction at The Rec Room at Roundhouse Park, Cineplex Entertainment announced that it had reached an agreement to be the exclusive Canadian franchisee of The Void — a chain of mixed reality entertainment attractions.

On September 13, 2018, Cineplex announced that it would acquire a stake in VRStudios—a Seattle-based provider of virtual reality installations, and utilize its equipment for as many as 40 VR centres across the country.

=== Scene+ ===
Launched in 2007, Scene+ is an entertainment rewards program jointly owned by Scotiabank, Empire and Cineplex Entertainment.

== Food and beverages ==
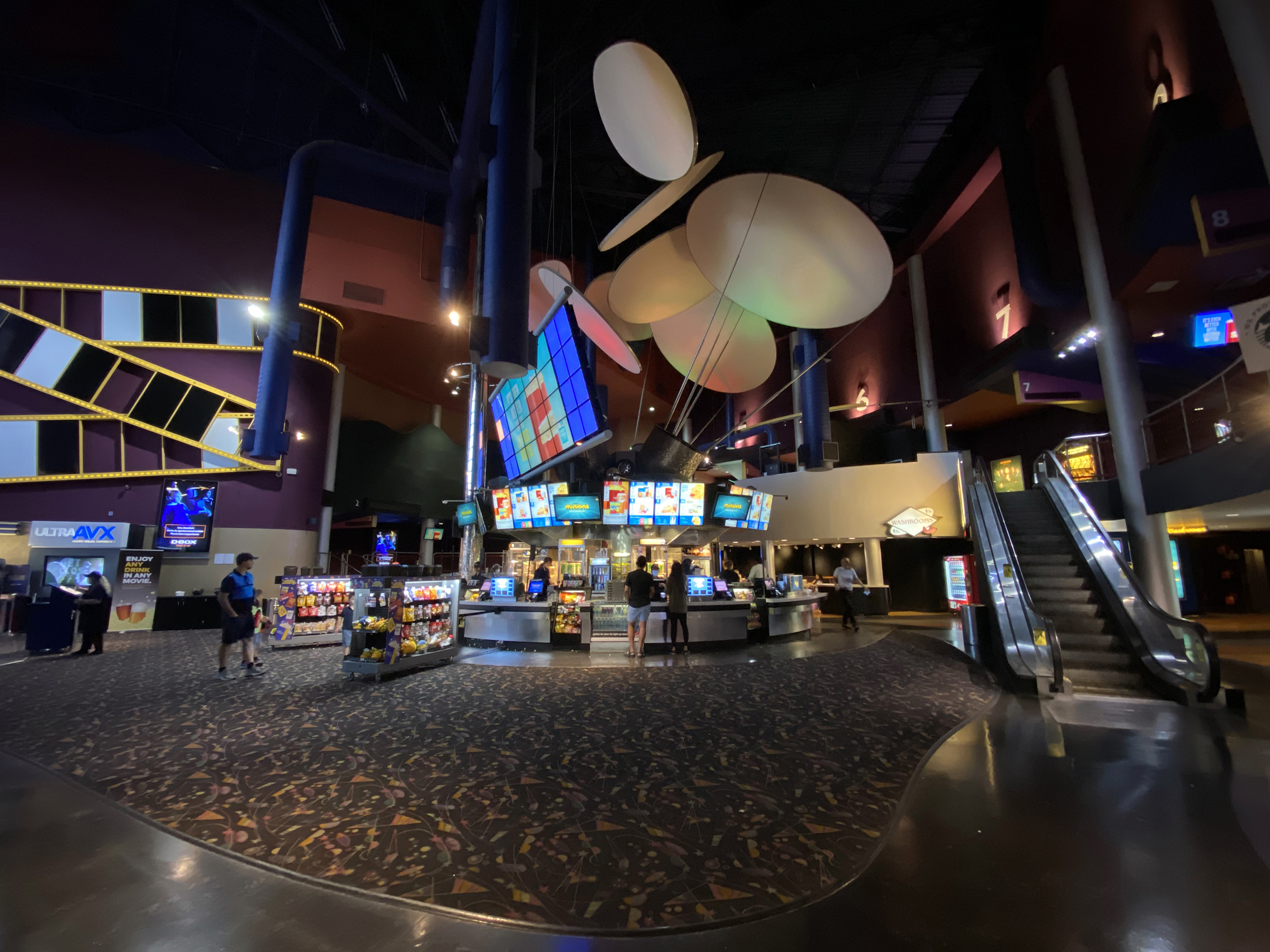
Food bar in Cineplex Cinema Mississauga

Cineplex has an Outtakes (French: Restoplex) restaurant in many of its theatres, some which replace previous restaurant partners (Burger King, KFC Express, Pizza Pizza/Pizza 73, Pizza Hut Express, Taco Bell Express and New York Fries) and others which introduce restaurants at locations which did not previously feature one. VIP Cinemas and some Xscape locations feature a licensed lounge with more premium offerings compared to Outtakes.

Poptopia is a flavoured popcorn restaurant offered in a full-service format at 22 locations. Other Cineplex theatres may feature Poptopia at the concession stand, but only in the caramel corn and/or kettle corn flavours.

Ice cream at Cineplex locations debuted with Baskin-Robbins and TCBY. Beginning in December 2007, Yogen Früz became the preferred partner. On January 1, 2014, Cineplex acquired a 50% stake in Yoyo's Yogurt Café. As of January 2017, 77 Cineplex theatres feature Yoyo's restaurants, while Yogen Fruz is still available in 23 Cineplex theatres while TCBY is available in 16 locations.

Beverages are available in both cold and hot formats. Cold beverages include the Coca-Cola lineup, which replaced the Pepsi lineup used at locations formerly owned by Famous Players. 12 locations feature Coca-Cola Freestyle. Hot beverages include Starbucks as the incumbent provider with 105 locations, all which offer Pike Place Roast coffee (regular or decaf) and Tazo tea. Select locations also offer premium drinks such as caffè mocha or caramel macchiato. Tim Hortons is available as a full-service restaurant in five locations, with Brossard being the only location to offer both Tim Hortons and Starbucks.

In most theatres, Cineplex offers sale of alcohol to 19+ patrons in Ontario (18+ in Alberta) similar to the VIP theatres albeit from a selection of beer or cider beverages.

== Corporate governance ==
The current chief executive officer and president of Cineplex Entertainment is Ellis Jacob. Alongside Jacob are Jordan Banks, who serves as a Facebook executive, Robert Bruce, Joan Dea, Ian Greenberg, the founder of Astral Media, Sarabjit S. Marwah, Anthony Munk, Edward Sonshine, Christopher Medlock, Robert J. Steacy and Phyllis Yaffe, who serves as its chair.

== Criticism and controversy ==
The Motley Fool described Cineplex as having a "virtual monopoly" over the cinema market in Canada.

In 2012, a class-action lawsuit was filed against Cineplex over locations refusing to honour the company's "Cheap Tuesdays" promotion. The company agreed to a $7,000 settlement, plus a $20,000 charitable donation.

In 2019, the producers of the anti-abortion film Unplanned criticized Cineplex for initially declining to pick up the film after securing a Canadian distributor. They felt it amounted to an effective "ban" of the film from Canada due to the company's scale. The film's co-director Cory Solomon also, along with other anti-abortion activists and religious groups, called for a boycott of Cineplex. The company later announced that it would— joining competitor Landmark Cinemas and a handful of independent cinemas — screen Unplanned with a one-week limited release at 24 Cineplex locations. The decision was praised by opponents of abortion, but did lead to criticism from abortion-rights (pro-choice) groups due to disputes over the film's content (with the Alberta Pro-Choice Coalition stating that it planned to hold a peaceful protest outside Scotiabank Theatre Chinook Centre). The film itself had already attracted criticism from groups, such as the Abortion Rights Coalition of Canada, over its factual accuracy, with the Coalition describing it as "American propaganda".

During the 2019 Toronto International Film Festival, festival organizers stated that Cineplex would no longer allow films distributed by an online video service (such as Prime Video or Netflix) to be screened at the Scotiabank Theatre Toronto (which has been considered the "primary" venue of the event for major screenings) due to company policy, as the services do not adhere to industry-standard theatrical windows. ScreenDaily stated that this was "believed to be the first time an exhibitor's position on theatrical windowing has affected scheduling at a major film festival".

On September 23, 2024, the Competition Tribunal ordered Cineplex to pay a $38.9 million fine for deceptive marketing practices. Cineplex added a $1.50 surcharge on all online ticket orders since June 2022, but used dark patterns to hide this fee from listed ticket prices until the end of the transaction. In October 2024, Cineplex appealed the decision to the Federal Court of Appeal.

== See also ==
- Landmark Cinemas - second largest movie theatre chain in Canada
