= Andrew Nikou =

American businessman (born 1977)

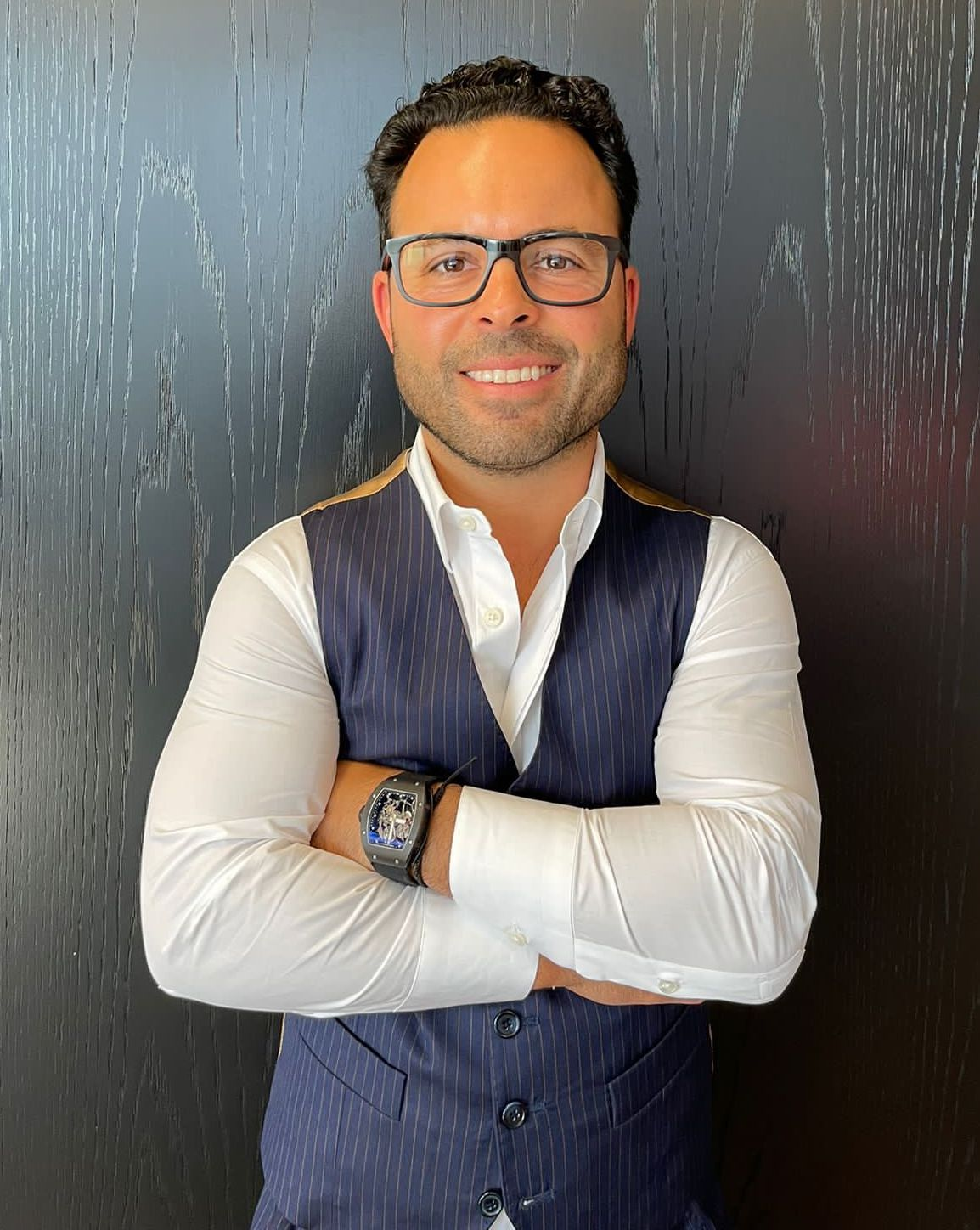
- Born: Vancouver, British Columbia, Canada
- Education: USC Marshall School of Business
- Occupation: Businessman
- Known for: OpenGate Capital
- Spouse: Odelia Nikou
- Children: 2

Andrew Nikou is a Canadian businessman who is the founder and CEO of OpenGate Capital, a global private buyout firm.

The firm is focused on acquiring lower to middle market businesses that are often privately owned, or non-core divisions of larger companies located around the world. To date, the firm has completed more than 75 transactions, including acquisitions and divestitures, and has acquired more than $8 billion in gross consolidated revenues. The firm first gained recognition for the acquisition of TV Guide Magazine in December 2008, and the publication's turn to profitability in the first quarter of 2010.

Nikou is actively involved with the management of each of the companies held in the portfolio.

Nikou has received recognition for his business achievements. In 2012, Nikou was a recipient of The M&A Advisor's "Top 40 Under 40" award for the West Region. In 2010, Nikou was named a Top Dealmaker of 2010 by Mergers & Acquisitions magazine. However, his actions have also drawn substantial criticism, including numerous lawsuits.

== Early years ==
Nikou was born in 1977 in Vancouver, British Columbia, Canada. His parents left their native Tehran before the Iranian Revolution and relocated to Canada, later moving with Nikou to California when he was four years old. His father, who majored in mathematics at a German university, worked at the Los Angeles Department of Water and Power.

Nikou grew up with a passion for trading baseball cards and competing in breakdancing competitions. He was bullied in school for being short.

Nikou graduated from William Howard Taft Charter High School in Woodland Hills, California, where he was active in the Persian community. Nikou studied finance at the University of Southern California Marshall School of Business. After graduating, he worked for the Patent and License Exchange, a start-up financed by Softbank Capital.

== Career ==
=== Platinum Equity ===
In 2001, Nikou began his career in private equity at Platinum Equity. At age 25, he moved to Paris to help open the firm's first European office. At Platinum Equity, he expanded the firm's international presence in Europe. In 2004, he left Platinum Equity and moved back to Los Angeles to start his own global investment firm.

=== OpenGate Capital ===
In 2005, Nikou founded OpenGate Capital with $30,000 from his own savings.

OpenGate Capital is a global private equity firm that acquires mid-market companies in the following industries: industrials, technology, consumer and business services.

By 2016, OpenGate had raised its first institutional fund and had made more than 40 acquisitions to turn around lower and middle-market businesses.

OpenGate Now has $1.5 billion in assets under management, specializing in the industrials and chemicals industries.

==== Fortune 500 division acquisitions ====
Under Nikou's leadership, OpenGate Capital bought founder-owned businesses and divisions of Fortune 500 companies such as Philips, Schlumberger, Arvin Meritor, Stora Enso and Cascades. In 2006, OpenGate purchased OMMIC, a former division of Philips. OpenGate sold OMMIC to Egalux SA Luxembourg in 2008.

In 2019, OpenGate purchased the lock company Sargent & Greenleaf from Stanley Black & Decker.

==== Media acquisitions ====
In 2008, Nikou negotiated the deal for OpenGate Capital to acquire TV Guide for $1 and $50 million in assumed liabilities from owner Rovi Corporation (previously Macrovision). TV Guide was profitable again within 2 years, and OpenGate sold it in 2015 for three times the cash it put into the business.

Later in 2008, Nikou led OpenGate Capital's bid for McGraw-Hill Companies BusinessWeek magazine, then withdrew from the bidding. Also in 2009, OpenGate purchased children's publishers Fleurus Presse and Junior Hebdo from Groupe Le Monde. In 2010, Nikou was behind the OpenGate bid for Newsweek, owned by the Washington Post Company, but the firm did not acquire the publication.

==== International acquisitions ====
Nikou increased OpenGate's pace of international acquisitions in the 2010s.

In 2019, OpenGate acquired the German content-management platform CoreMedia. Also in 2019, OpenGate purchased the UK-based Duraco Specialty Tapes, which then acquired Infinity Tapes the following year. In 2018, OpenGate acquired the Italian stove and fireplace manufacturer Jotul from the European private equity group Ratos.

In 2012, through the firm's legacy, pre-fund investment process, OpenGate Capital acquired the Latin American operations of Getronics from the Dutch conglomerate, KPN. In 2011, the firm acquired NorPaper Avot Vallée, a specialty paper manufacturer based in France. And in 2010, OpenGate acquired Brazilian-based Philips Business Communications, since renamed Sopho which merged into Getronics LATAM, and Finland-based KotkaMills, a laminating paper and wood business.

In April 2024, OpenGate sold the French waterproofing and building insulation firm SMAC to Compagnie Financière Jousset, making 10 times its $17 million investment. The company was acquired and formed in a carve-out from Colas Group in 2019.

==== OpenGate Capital Partners I and II ====
In July 2016, OpenGate closed its first institutional fund, OpenGate Capital Partners I, at $305 million, exceeding its target of $300 million and raising about twice what the average new private equity fund does, according to Preqin. As of August 2018, OpenGate's first fund had completed nine platform investments, five of which had closed in 2016.

In November 2016, OpenGate Capital completed the acquisition of the zinc products business of the Belgian company Umicore for $150 million in debt and equity. The deal was the fifth platform investment from OpenGate's debut fund. OpenGate rebranded the business EverZinc; within Umicore, it generated $425 million in revenue in 2015. In January 2019, EverZinc purchased G.H. Chemicals and Microzinc, collectively known as GHC. This was OpenGate's second add-on acquisition.

Several pre-fund, legacy investments that were made with the personal capital of Andrew Nikou and the Partners at OpenGate Capital were sold: Benvic was sold to InvestIndustrial in December 2017, NorPaper Avot-Vallee was sold in 2018 to a private investor, and in January 2019, NAKAN (the largest division within Ivy Group) was sold to Westlake Chemical Corporation.

In October 2019, OpenGate Capital closed on the firm's second institutional fund, OpenGate Capital Partners II, oversubscribed on its original $450 million target, with approximately $585 million in commitments. In that same year, the firm also completed six platform investments, and one add-on, all within the second fund.

Power Partners Inc., the first investment completed in OpenGate's first fund, was realized in November 2019 through the sale to Pioneer Transformers, a portfolio company of Mill Point Partners.

==== Other acquisitions ====
OpenGate's other acquisitions include manufacturing companies Chemisphere, a St. Louis, Missouri-based specialty solvent blender and chemical distributor, and Extrusiones de Toledo (Extol), one of the leaders in the aluminum extrusion sector in Spain and France.

Prior to raising its first institutional fund, OpenGate also acquired the Waukesha, Wisconsin plant and brand rights to Golden Guernsey Dairy as the result of an antitrust divestment of Dean Foods, which was required to sell the plant to purchase GGD's other plants in the state.

On January 5, 2013, Golden Guernsey ceased operations in an alleged violation of the State of Wisconsin's mass layoff/shutdown regulations. The Golden Guernsey plant employed over 100 workers.

Past closures also included PennySaver USA and Hamilton Scientific. Lawsuits have been filed under the WARN Act when firing hundreds of employees from PennySaver and Hamilton Scientific.

=== Film ===
Andrew was the Executive Producer of an Academy Award nominated short documentary "The Barber of Little Rock."

== Philanthropy ==
Nikou sits on the Board of YELLOW, the non-profit organization founded by Pharrell Williams. In 2014, Nikou announced that he was forming a partnership with businessman Ricardo Salinas to bring Esperanza Azteca Youth Orchestra to Los Angeles through a partnership with the city's mayor, Eric Garcetti. On October 7, 2014, an official ceremony was held to celebrate the inauguration of the first Esperanza Azteca America program at the Florence Nightingale Middle School in Los Angeles.

In 2016, Andrew Nikou started the Andrew Nikou Foundation, an organization that focuses on education. That same year, Nikou sponsored an anti-bullying initiative between The Andrew Nikou Foundation and XPRIZE, of which he sits on the Innovation Board.

In 2021, the Andrew Nikou Foundation, together with USC and other partners, started Education (Re)Open, designed to address faults in the education system exacerbated by the COVID-19 pandemic.

== Personal life ==
Nikou is married with children and resides in Nevada.
