= List of filming locations in the British Columbia Interior =

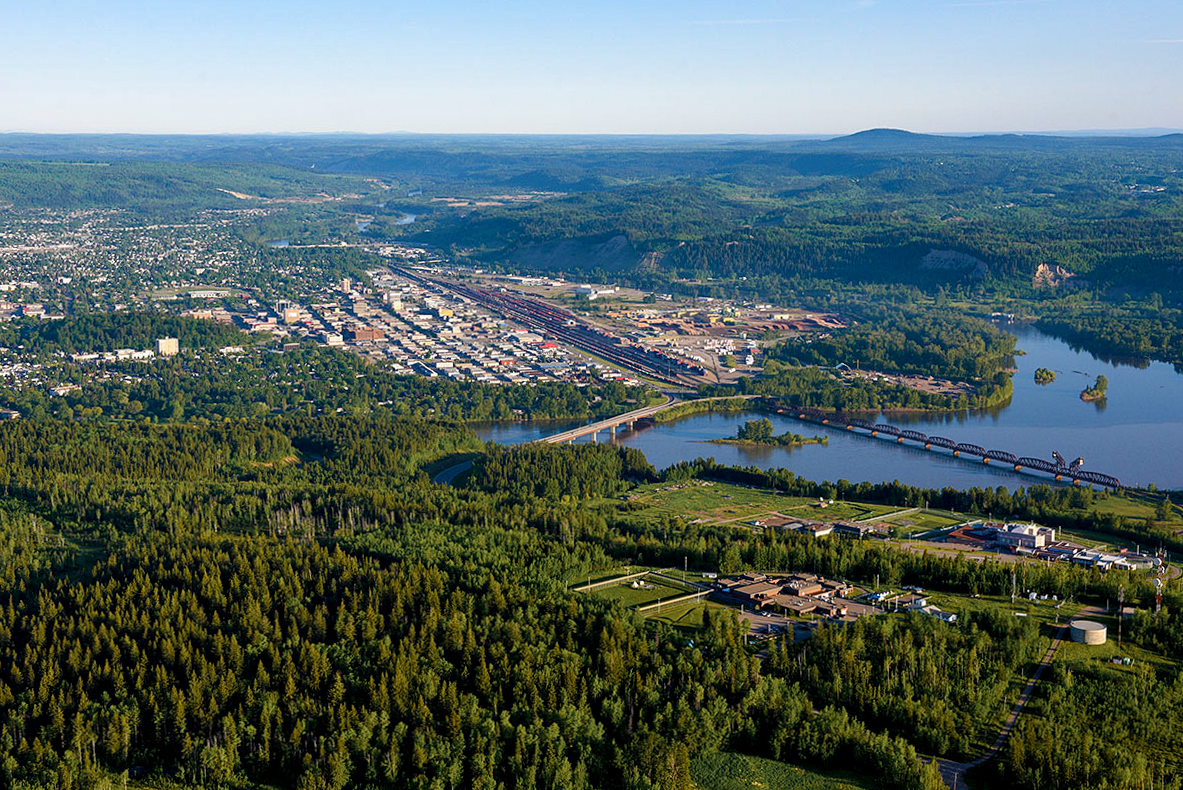
Prince George, BC

List of filming locations in the British Columbia Interior, arranged by location.

== Ashcroft ==
- The Andromeda Strain (2008)
- An Unfinished Life (2005)

== Barkerville ==
- Harry Tracy, Desperado
- Klondike Fever
- The Legend of Kootenai Brown (also known as Showdown at Williams Creek)

== Cache Creek ==
- The Andromeda Strain (2008)
- Joy Ride 2: Dead Ahead (2008)

== Fort Steele ==
- Snow Queen

== Fraser Canyon ==
- The Grey Fox
- The Pledge

== Hedley ==
- The Andromeda Strain (2008)

== Hope ==
- First Blood (1982)

== Kamloops ==
- The Andromeda Strain (2008)
- Battlestar Galactica
- Cadence
- Firewall
- An Unfinished Life

== Kelowna ==
- Fido
- The Hillclimb
- The Legend of Simon Conjurer
- Mee-Shee: The Water Giant
- The Projectionist
- Say Yes & Marry Me
- The Scarecrow and The Rainbow Kid
- A Sister's Nightmare
- Stolen Lives
- The Tattoo
- Time Runner, aka In Exile
- The Union: The Business Behind Getting High
- What Are You Anyways?
- WWF Smackdown
- X-Weighted
- The Recall
- Humanity Bureau
- Distorted
- Daughter of the Wolf
- The Last Victim

== Lillooet ==
- Atomic Train
- La Menace
- The Pledge

== Lytton ==
- The Pledge

== Nelson ==
- Roxanne
- Housekeeping
- A Simple Curve
- The Tall Man

== Penticton ==
- My American Cousin

== Prince George ==
- Double Jeopardy
- Dreamcatcher
- Reindeer Games
- Strange Brew

== Princeton ==
- The Grey Fox
- The Pledge

== Savona ==
- The Andromeda Strain (2008)

== Stewart ==
- Baby This Is for You
- Bear Island
- Eight Below
- Iceman
- Insomnia
- The Thing

== Summerland ==
- My American Cousin
- Time Runner

== Thompson-Nicola Region ==
- The Andromeda Strain (2008)

== Vernon ==
- Fido

== See also ==
- List of filming locations in the Vancouver area
- Hollywood North
