= Tuschinski =

Tuschinski may refer to:

== People ==
- Abraham Icek Tuschinski (1886–1942), founder of the Tuschinski theatre
- Alexander Tuschinski (born 1988), German film director and writer

== Places ==
- Tuschinski Theatre, movie theatre in Amsterdam, Netherlands
