= Todd Bryanton =

Canadian musician and composer (born 1981)

- Born: Todd Bryanton; August 8, 1981 (age 44); Regina, Saskatchewan, Canada
- Occupations: Musician; composer; voice actor; YouTuber
- Years active: 2011–present
- Musical career
- Genres: Musical comedy; electronic; hip-hop; ska; electrofunk
- Instruments: Drums; keyboards; guitar; bass guitar; vocals

YouTube information
- Channel: lildeucedeuce
- Years active: 2011–present
- Genres: Music; comedy
- Subscribers: 466 thousand
- Views: 147 million
- Last updated: February 12, 2026
- Website: lildeucedeuce.com

Todd Bryanton (born August 8, 1981), also known as LilDeuceDeuce, is a Canadian musician, composer, voice actor, and YouTuber. He is best known for writing, producing, and performing music to his YouTube channel, as well as indie online projects, film, and television series. He produced the song “Beep Beep I’m a Sheep” for Thomas Ridgewell's asdfmovie, which was later featured in Just Dance 2018 by Ubisoft.

== Early life ==
Todd Bryanton was born on 8 August 1981 in Regina, Saskatchewan. Prior to his career, he worked locally as a musician before transitioning into composing music online on sites such as YouTube and Newgrounds in the early 2010s.

== Career ==
Bryanton began releasing music under the alias LilDeuceDeuce around 2011. His music would typically blend electronic music for animated and viral internet videos on YouTube

In 2017, he went viral with “Beep Beep I’m a Sheep”, created in collaboration with British YouTuber, Thomas Ridgewell (TomSka) and vocalist Gabriel Brown (Black Gryph0n). The song originated from Ridgewell's animated web series asdfmovie10 and accumulated millions of views on YouTube. The song was later featured in Ubisoft’s Just Dance 2018.

Bryanton's work has been featured in animated works highlighted by digital media outlets. Bryanton has also contributed to 8-bit-style remixes of TV intros.

=== Musical style and influence ===
Bryanton’s music is characterised by upbeat melodies, electronic instrumentation, and humour-driven lyrics that align closely with meme culture.

== Discography ==
=== Singles ===
Year	Title	Notes	Source
2011	“Bad Singer”	Early LilDeuceDeuce release	
2011	“Hello!”	Featured in asdfmovie4	
2011	“I Like Trains”	Viral song from asdfmovie2; achieved significant meme status	
2012	“Mine Turtle”	Viral song from asdfmovie5	
2012	“Pony”	Internet music release	
2013	“Leperchaun”	Internet music release	
2013	“asdfmovie song”	Official theme for the asdfmovie web series	
2014	“Everybody Do the Flop”	Viral dance song from asdfmovie6	
2015	“I'm a Stegosaurus”	Featured in asdfmovie7	
2015	“asdfmovie9 song”	Animated web series song	
2017	“Beep Beep I’m a Sheep”	Viral novelty song; featured in Just Dance 2018	
2018	“The Muffin Song”	Lead song for asdfmovie11; widely viral on social media	
2018	“Shoot All Your Problems Away”	Featured in asdfmovie11	
2019	“asdfmovie12 song”	Animated web series song	
2021	“asdfmovie13 song”	Animated web series song	
2022	“Real Man!”	Featured in asdfmovie14	
2024	“asdfmovie15 song”	Animated web series song	

=== Film and television composer ===
Year	Title	Role	Notes
2025	We Were Broncos	Composer	6‑part documentary series
2024	Die Alone	Composer	Suspense/drama film
2021	Dangerous	Composer	Action/thriller film
2021	Beyblade Burst Surge	Composer	Kids/anime TV series
2020	Endless	Composer	Romantic drama film
2020	Cagefighter: Worlds Collide	Composer	Sports/action film
2018	Ghostland	Composer	Psychological horror film (credited as *Incident in a Ghostland*)
2018	Distorted	Composer	Thriller film
2018	SuperGrid	Composer	Action/sci‑fi film
2018	Welcome to Nowhere	Composer	Romantic comedy film
2017	The Humanity Bureau	Composer	Action/sci‑fi film
2017	The Recall	Composer	Sci‑fi film
2017	Adventure Club	Composer	Family/adventure film
2016	Patient 62	Composer	Sci‑fi film
2016	A.R.C.H.I.E.	Composer	Family/sci‑fi film
2013	Stranded	Composer	Sci‑fi/suspense film
2012–2016	Eddsworld	Composer	Flash-animated web series
2012	The Tall Man	Composer	Horror/drama film
2009	Hungry Hills	Composer	Drama film
2008	Surveillance	Composer	Thriller film
2007	The Wedding Wish	Composer	Romantic comedy film
2006	Android Apocalypse	Composer	Action/sci‑fi film
2010–2011	InSecurity	Composer	Comedy TV series, 2 seasons/23 episodes
2004–2009	Corner Gas	Composer	Comedy TV series, 6 seasons/107 episodes
2004–2008	Renegadepress.com	Composer	Youth drama TV series, 5 seasons/51 episodes

== Reception ==
Bryanton’s work has been the subject of sustained coverage by Canadian national outlets including CBC News and Global News, as well as regional publications such as the Regina Leader-Post. Coverage has focused on his viral rise, cross-platform success, and the integration of internet-originated music into mainstream entertainment.
