= Pathé Cinémas =

Cinema chain

Pathé Cinémas SASU
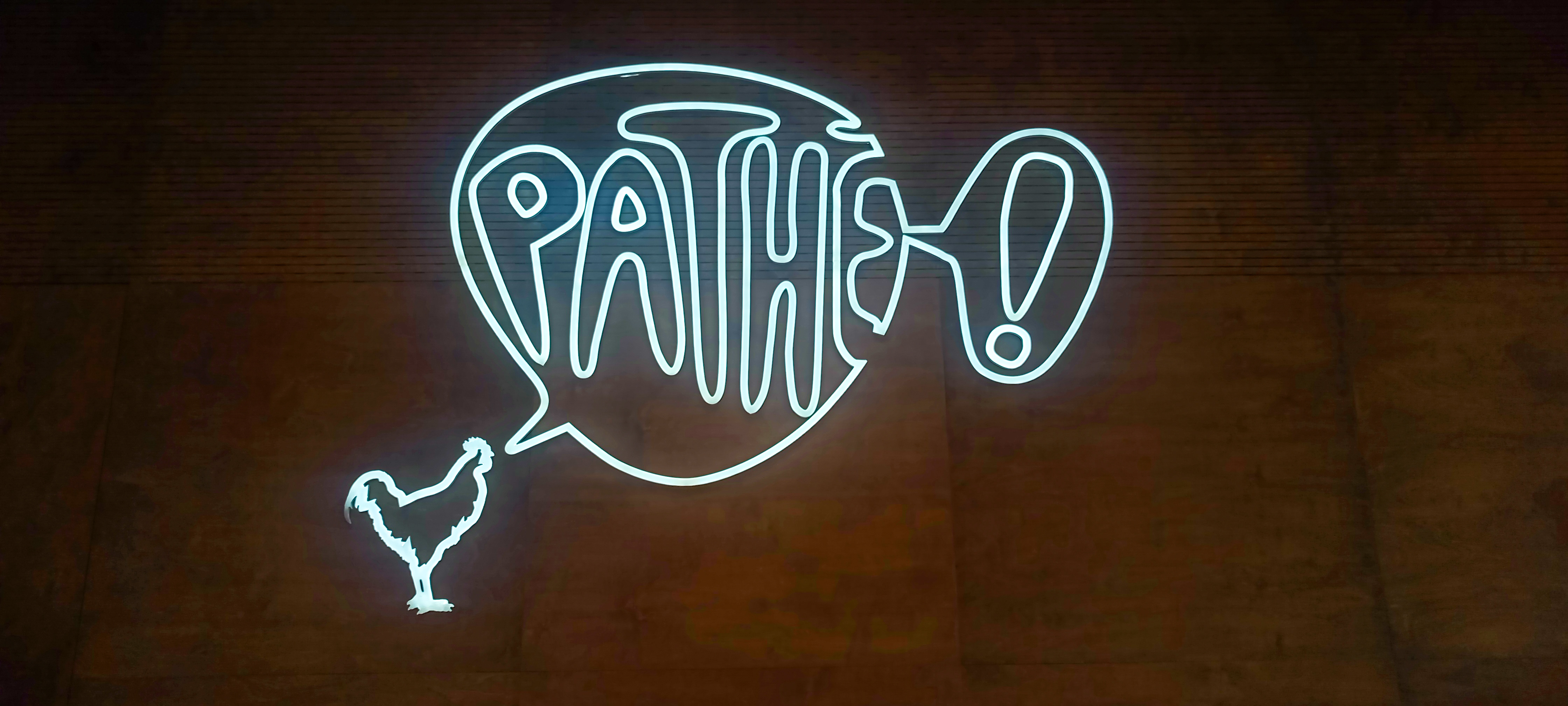
- Formerly: EuroPalaces (2001–2010); Les Cinémas Gaumont Pathé (2010–2018); Les Cinémas Pathé Gaumont (2018–2022)
- Type: Subsidiary
- Industry: Film
- Founded: First Pathé cinema : 1901 Pathé Cinémas SASU : 2001
- Founder: Gaumont; Pathé
- Number of locations: 121 cinemas
- Brands: Pathé, Gaumont, Euroscoop and Cinépointcom
- Revenue: ▲€ 748 million (2018)
- Net income: ▲€ 58.1 million (2011)
- Parent: Gaumont (2001–2017); Pathé
- Website: pathe.fr

Pathé Cinémas SASU is a cinema chain owned by Pathé, with operations in France, the Netherlands, Switzerland, Belgium, Morocco, and Tunisia. The company is market leader in the former three. Pathé is Europe's second largest cinema chain and the oldest cinéma chain in the world still in operation.

== History ==
EuroPalaces was formed in 2001 when the French film production and distribution companies Pathé and Gaumont merged their cinema operations, respectively owned by Jérôme Seydoux and Nicolas Seydoux. Gaumont owned 34% and Pathé owned 66% of the shares in the joint venture. In 2010, EuroPalaces was renamed Les Cinémas Gaumont Pathé. On March 1, 2017, it was announced that Gaumont sold its 34% stake in Les Cinémas Gaumont Pathé to Pathé for €380 million, Gaumont wanted to focus more on the production and distribution of content. The name of the company changed shortly thereafter to Les Cinémas Pathé Gaumont, then to Pathé Cinémas in 2023 when Pathé removed the Gaumont brand from its cinemas.

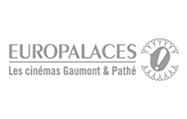
Europalaces logo (2001–2010)

The company grew its circuit with several acquisitions throughout the years, notable acquisitions were MGM Cinemas in 1995, Minerva Cinemas in 2010 in The Netherlands; CinePointCom in 2015 in Belgium; EuropaCorp Cinemas in 2016, CineAlpes in 2019 in France and Euroscoop Cinemas in 2019 in The Netherlands and Belgium. The majority of the acquired cinemas were - or are in the process of being - converted to the Pathé brand. In 2021 Pathé decided to sell three of its recent acquired CineAlpes cinemas to CinéWest.

Until 2010 the company operated several cinemas in Italy, but these locations were sold due to difficulties in the Italian market.

In 2018, Les Cinémas Pathé Gaumont entered the African market by opening a cinema In Tunis, Tunisia, with plans in progress to open locations in Ivory Coast, Morocco and Senegal.

On October 28, 2021, Pathé Tuschinski - during its centennial - received the Royal Predicate from the Dutch monarch, changing its name to Koninklijk Theater Tuschinski (Royal Theater Tuschinski).

In 2022, the group entered the Moroccan market by opening a cinema in Californie Mall, Casablanca. Pathé Cinémas says it wants affordable cinemas, not luxury ones.

== Technologies ==
The company uses different technologies in their operations, like IMAX. The IMAX Corporation stated that it will strengthen its relationship with Les Cinémas Pathé Gaumont. They will do that by expanding the total number of locations and also by upgrading existing locations to IMAX Laser with IMAX's 12-channel sound technology. The expanding and upgrading will start in 2018 and all locations will be upgraded by 2023, making Les Cinémas Pathé Gaumont the first multi-territory network to be fully powered by IMAX Laser.

The company also partnered with Dolby using their Dolby Atmos and Dolby Cinema products.

In 2017 they partnered with the Korean company CJ 4DPlex to open the first 4DX location in France. During the Cannes Film Festival, it was announced that Les Cinémas Pathé Gaumont will open 30 4DX cinemas throughout France, the Netherlands, Switzerland, and Belgium before 2020. On 22 December 2017 CJ 4DPlex announced in a press release that they have extended their agreement by adding an additional 20 locations, bringing the total to 50.

With the opening of the 500th 4DX location worldwide at Pathé Belle Épine in April 2018, the company announced that they extended their partnership with CJ 4DPlex once with the opening of two ScreenX auditoriums in Paris in June 2018. Additionally, it has installed the first 4DX Screen theater, a combination of 4DX and ScreenX, outside the Asian region in Paris.

In 2023, Pathé Cinemas acquires exclusive rights for IMAX in Morocco, previously accorded to the Moroccan-owned IMAX cinema in Morocco Mall.

== Regions served ==
Mainly based in France, Pathé Cinémas operates 38 cinemas across neighbouring Belgium, Switzerland, and the Netherlands. Pathé also operates 7 cinemas in 4 countries in Africa.

Country	Current	Future	Closed
France	77	2	7
Netherlands	31	2	0
Belgium	7	0	3
Tunisia	3	1	0
Côte d'Ivoire	1	0	0
Morocco	2	0	0
Senegal	1	0	0
Total	121	5	10

== Cinemas ==
A list of all current and future cinemas operated by Pathé Cinémas, as well as cinemas closed/sold since 2022.

Categories
Closed
Acquired
Proposed/Under Construction

France
City	Cinema		Screens	Seats
Aix-en-Provence	Le Cézanne Acquired from Les Cinemas Aixois in 2020		9	1539
Aix-en-Provence	Le Mazarin Acquired from Les Cinemas Aixois in 2020		3	393
Aix-en-Provence	Le Renoir Acquired from Les Cinemas Aixois in 2020		3	430
Amiens	Pathé Amiens	4DX	12	2497
Angers	Pathé Angers	4DX D-Box Dolby Atmos	12	2373
Annecy	Pathé Annecy	Dolby Atmos	10	1831
Archamps	Pathé Archamps	IMAX Laser	12	2554
Aubière	Pathé Aubière Acquired from CineAlpes in 2019	4DX IMAX Laser	14	2464
Avignon	Pathé Cap Sud	4DX D-Box	14	2456
Belfort	Pathé Belfort Sold to Kinepolis in 2023	4DX	14	2489
Boulogne-Billancourt	Pathé Boulogne		7	1444
Boulogne-Billancourt	Pathé île Seguin Announced in 2019 with a proposed opening in 2022			
Brest	Multiplex Liberté Acquired from CineAlpes in 2019	4DX	15	2521
Brest	Pathé Capucins	Dolby Atmos	5	
Calais	Pathé Cité Europe		12	2306
Caen	Pathé Les Rives de l'Orne	4DX D-Box Dolby Atmos	10	1795
Chambéry	Pathé Chambéry	4DX	10	1481
Conflans-Sainte-Honorine	Pathé Conflans	4DX IMAX Laser	13	3035
Clermont-Ferrand	Ciné Capitole Acquired from CineAlpes in 2019		5	
Clermont-Ferrand	Ciné Jaude Acquired from CineAlpes in 2019. Closed 2025.	Dolby Atmos Eclair Color	7	1224
Creusot	Le Morvan Acquired from CineAlpes in 2019. Closed.		4	
Dammarie-lès-Lys	Pathé Dammarie		10	2109
Dijon	Pathé Dijon Opened in 2022.		9	1200
Évreux	Pathé Évreux		10	1961
Grenoble	Pathé Grenoble Formerly Pathé Chavant	IMAX	10	2947
Grenoble	Pathé Échirolles	4DX	12	2762
Issoire	Le Modern Acquired from CineAlpes in 2019. No longer Pathé.		3	408
Ivry-sur-Seine	Pathé Quai d'Ivry	4DX IMAX Laser	14	3314
La Plaine Saint-Denis	Pathé Saint-Denis	4DX	9	1377
Le Grand-Quevilly	Pathé Grand Quevilly	4DX IMAX	16	3531
Le Havre	Pathé Docks Vauban	4DX Dolby Atmos	12	2276
Le Mans	Pathé Le Mans	Dolby Atmos	11	1784
Levallois	Pathé Levallois	4DX Dolby Atmos	8	1393
Lieusaint	Pathé Carré Sénart	4DX D-Box IMAX Laser	17	3685
Liévin	Pathé Liévin	Dolby Atmos	15	3214
Lille-Sud	Pathé Lille-Sud Announced in 2018 with a proposed opening in 2022			
Lyon	Pathé Bellecour	4DX Dolby Atmos	10	1992
Lyon	Pathé Carré de Soie	4DX IMAX Laser	15	3331
Lyon	Pathé Vaise	D-Box Dolby Atmos Dolby Cinema	14	2485
Mâcon	Pathé Mâcon Acquired from CineAlpes in 2019		11	2086
Marne-la-Vallée	Gaumont Disney Village	4DX D-Box IMAX Laser	15	3725
Marseille	Pathé La Joliette Acquired from EuropaCorp in 2018	4DX Screen Dolby Cinema	14	2019
Marseille	Pathé Madeleine		8	1313
Marseille	Pathé Plan de Campagne	4DX IMAX Laser Dolby Atmos	17	3453
Marseille	Les 3 Palmes Acquired from Tarizzo Family in 2024		11	2436
Massy	Pathé Massy	Dolby Cinema	9	1844
Metz	Pathé Amnéville Sold to Kinepolis in 2022	4DX	12	2448
Montataire	Pathé Montataire	4DX	14	3214
Montceau-les-Mines	Les Plessis Acquired from CineAlpes in 2019. No longer Pathé.		3	
Montpellier	Pathé Comédie		8	1110
Montpellier	Pathé Odysseum	4DX D-Box IMAX Laser	17	3683
Nantes	Pathé Nantes		12	1817
Nantes	Pathé Atlantis	4DX D-Box Dolby Atmos	14	2877
Nice	Pathé Gare du Sud	Dolby Cinema	9	1493
Nice	Pathé Lingostière	4DX D-Box Dolby Atmos	13	2614
Nice	Pathé Masséna		7	1332
Orléans	Pathé Orléans	4DX	12	2165
Orléans	Pathé Saran	IMAX Laser	10	2280
Paris	Pathé Alésia	Dolby Atmos	8	1367
Paris	Pathé Aquaboulevard	4DX	14	2389
Paris	Pathé BNP Paribas Formerly Pathé Opéra Premier		5	440
Paris	Pathé Champs-Élysées Closed December 2023.		6	1597
Paris	Pathé Convention	Dolby Atmos	9	1242
Paris	Pathé Les Fauvettes		5	638
Paris	Pathé Beaugrenelle	4DX Screen Dolby Atmos Dolby Cinema Onyx CinemaLed	10	1578
Paris	Pathé Parnasse		19	3211
Paris	Pathé Wepler	4DX Eclair Color Dolby Atmos	12	1755
Paris	Pathé La Villette	4DX Screen X IMAX Laser Dolby Atmos	16	2811
Paris	Pathé Montparnos		4	810
Paris	Les 7 Batignolles		7	1163
Paris	Pathé Palace	Dolby Atmos	7	882
Paris	La Géode Reopened 2024.	IMAXDome	1	300
Quetigny	Ciné Cap Vert Acquired from CineAlpes in 2019		12	2382
Reims	Pathé Thillois Formerly Pathé Parc Millésime	4DX IMAX Laser	13	2520
Rennes	Pathé Rennes	4DX Dolby Atmos Dolby Cinema	13	2410
Roissy CDG	Pathé Aéroville Acquired from EuropaCorp in 2018	4DX Dolby Atmos Dolby Cinema	12	2059
Rouen	Pathé Docks 76	Dolby Atmos Dolby Cinema	14	2674
Strasbourg	Pathé Brumath	4DX Dolby Atmos	14	2683
Thiais	Pathé Belle Épine	4DX D-Box Dolby Atmos Dolby Cinema	16	3199
Toulon	Pathé La Valette	4DX IMAX Laser	16	3176
Toulon	Pathé Toulon		9	1551
Toulouse	Pathé Labège	4DX IMAX Laser	17	3580
Toulouse	Pathé Wilson	Dolby Atmos Dolby Cinema	15	3101
Tours	Pathé Tours Acquired from CineAlpes in 2019	IMAX Laser Dolby Atmos	9	1814
Valence	Pathé Valence	4DX	12	2210
Valenciennes	Pathé Valenciennes	4DX	15	3556

Netherlands
City	Cinema		Screens	Seats
Amersfoort	Pathé Amersfoort Building site acquired from Minerva in 2010	Screen X	8	1754
Amstelveen	Pathé Amstelveen Announced in 2020 with a proposed opening in 2025			
Amsterdam	Pathé Amsterdam Noord Building site acquired from Euroscoop in 2019	Dolby Atmos	12	2500
Amsterdam	Pathé Arena	4DX IMAX laser	14	3246
Amsterdam	Pathé City Acquired from MGM Cinemas in 1995		7	490
Amsterdam	Pathé de Munt	4DX Dolby Cinema	13	1829
Amsterdam	Koninklijk Theater Tuschinski Acquired from MGM Cinemas in 1995		6	1431
Arnhem	Pathé Arnhem	IMAX laser Dolby Atmos	9	1683
Breda	Pathé Breda Acquired from Minerva in 2010		7	901
Delft	Pathé Delft Acquired from Minerva in 2010		7	1341
The Hague	Pathé Buitenhof Acquired from Minerva in 2010		6	1279
The Hague	Pathé Scheveningen	4DX Dolby Cinema	8	1956
The Hague	Pathé Spuimarkt	IMAX laser Screen X	9	2325
The Hague	Pathé Ypenburg Building site acquired from Euroscoop in 2019		8	1442
Ede	Pathé Ede Acquired from CineMec in 2014		9	2332
Eindhoven	Pathé Eindhoven	4DX IMAX laser	8	1018
Groningen	Pathé Groningen Acquired from MGM Cinemas in 1995		9	1671
Haarlem	Pathé Haarlem Building site acquired from Minerva in 2010		8	784
Helmond	Pathé Helmond		6	1102
Leeuwarden	Pathé Leeuwarden		7	620
Maastricht	Pathé Maastricht	4DX Dolby Atmos	8	986
Nijmegen	Pathé Nijmegen Building site acquired from CineMec in 2014	4DX Dolby Atmos	8	1911
Rotterdam	Pathé de Kuip	4DX Dolby Cinema	14	2746
Rotterdam	Pathé Schouwburgplein	IMAX laser	7	1931
Rotterdam	Pathé Zuidplein Announced in 2017 with a proposed opening in 2024			
Schiedam	Pathé Schiedam Acquired from Euroscoop in 2019	Dolby Atmos	11	2410
Tilburg	Pathé Stappegoor Acquired from Euroscoop in 2019	Dolby Atmos	12	2515
Tilburg	Pathé Tilburg Centrum Acquired from Minerva in 2010	IMAX	7	1341
Utrecht	Pathé Rembrandt Utrecht Acquired from MGM Cinemas in 1995		3	782
Utrecht	Pathé Utrecht Leidsche Rijn Building site acquired from CineMec in 2014	4DX Dolby Atmos	7	1867
Vlissingen	Pathé Vlissingen Acquired from CineCity in 2024	Dolby Atmos	7	1211
Zaandam	Pathé Zaandam Building site acquired from Minerva in 2010		6	1175
Zwolle	Pathé Zwolle	4DX Dolby Atmos 2x	9	1515

Switzerland
City	Cinema		Screens	Seats
Basel	Pathé Kuchlin Closed in 2023 due to liquidation.		8	2106
Bern	Pathé Westside	4DX	11	2348
Dietlikon	Pathé Dietlikon	4DX D-Box	10	2207
Geneva	Pathé Balexert	IMAX D-Box	13	2757
Lausanne	Pathé Flon	4DX	7	1871
Lausanne	Pathé Les Galeries		8	1024
Lucerne	Pathé Mall of Switzerland	4DX D-Box IMAX Laser Dolby Atmos	12	1962
Spreitenbach	Pathé Spreitenbach	IMAX Laser Dolby Atmos	10	1322

Belgium
City	Cinema		Screens	Seats
Charleroi	Pathé Charleroi Acquired from Cinépointcom in 2015	4DX IMAX Laser	15	3700
Genk	Pathé Genk Acquired from Euroscoop in 2019		10	2020
Lanaken	Euroscoop Lanaken Acquired from Euroscoop in 2019. Closed.		8	1070
Libramont	Cinépointcom Libramont Acquired from Cinépointcom in 2015. Closed.		2	
Louvain-la-Neuve	Pathé Louvain-La-Neuve Acquired from Euroscoop in 2019		13	2800
Maasmechelen	Pathé Maasmechelen Acquired from Euroscoop in 2019		11	2200
Marche-en-Famenne	Cinépointcom Marche-en-Famenne Acquired from Cinépointcom in 2015. Closed.		3	
Namur	Pathé Anicapolis Acquired from Euroscoop in 2019		12	2500
Sint-Niklaas	Pathé Sint-Niklaas Acquired from Euroscoop in 2019		8	2200
Verviers	Pathé Verviers Acquired from Cinépointcom in 2015		8	1550

Tunisia
City	Cinema		Screens	Seats
Sousse	Pathé Mall of Sousse		6	
Tunis	Pathé Tunis City		8	
Mornag	Pathé Azur City	Dolby Atmos	6	
Sfax	Pathé Mall of Sfax Scheduled opening date was late 2023. No further news has been published.			

Côte d'Ivoire
City	Cinema	Screens	Seats
Abidjan	Pathé Cap Sud	6	<1000

Morocco
City	Cinema		Screens	Seats
Casablanca	Pathé Californie 40% owned by Pathé, 60% owned by Marjane	4DX IMAX Laser	8	

Senegal
City	Cinema		Screens	Seats
Dakar	Pathé Dakar	Dolby Atmos	7	1394
