= Twintapes =

Electropop band from Brooklyn, New York

- Origin: Brooklyn, New York
- Genres: Electropop
- Years active: 2007-present
- Label: Yamico Music
- Members: Pavel Rivera, Landon Knoblock, Benny Reiner
- Website: www.twintapes.com

Twintapes is an electropop band based in Brooklyn, New York. Pavel Rivera is the band's creator, singer and composer. Other band members include Landon Knoblock and Benny Reiner. Twintapes does not use laptops or prerecorded/produced tracks during live performances.

== History ==
Pavel Rivera created Twintapes in 2007 as a duo with Jon Estes, a friend from college. The band is named after the duplicate tapes Rivera created of his favorite music after he lost a mixed tape to a faulty cassette player. Rivera is originally from the Dominican Republic and Estes from Tennessee. Twintapes released its debut album Somewhere Down the Road in 2009. In October 2011, the band released Pluto. In April 2013, Twintapes won mtvU's The Freshmen Competition. The band's single "Fast Forward" was released in January 2014. The following month, Twintapes was listed on the Deli's "Best of 2013 Poll for NYC Emerging Artists." The band was also recognized on the listing the following year. Twintapes released "Everyday Chemical" in March 2014 and in April of that year headlined a show at the Mercury Lounge.

== Discography ==
=== Studio albums ===
- Somewhere Down the Road (2009)
- Pluto (2011)
- WDWG (2013)
- Mass Disintegration (2015)

=== Singles ===
- "Christmas Demolition (feat. Eddsworld) (2010)
- "Fast Forward" (2014)
