= Kevin DeWalt =

Canadian film and television producer (born 1959)

- Born: 1957 (age 68–69); Moose Jaw, Saskatchewan, Canada
- Education: University of Regina
- Occupations: Film and television producer
- Years active: 1983–present
- Known for: A Score to Settle; The Tall Man; Forsaken

Kevin DeWalt (born 1957) is a Canadian film and television producer based in Regina, Saskatchewan. He is the former president of the International Quorum of Motion Picture Producers and the past Chairman of the Canadian Film and Television Production Association. DeWalt has produced over 60 films and television shows such as A Score to Settle, The Englishman's Boy, Forsaken and The Tall Man. He is the founder and the CEO of Minds Eye Entertainment, a Canadian film production and distribution company.

== Early life ==
DeWalt was born in 1957 in Moose Jaw, Saskatchewan to Elaine and Art DeWalt. He attended Luther College, University of Regina where he studied music.

== Career ==
DeWalt's first production in 1983 was a touring multimedia travelogue using 6 slide projectors and a 16 mm film projector of his three year around the world backpacking travel adventure titled Namaste.

In 1986, DeWalt founded Minds Eye Entertainment with Ken Krawczyk in Regina. The company produces and distributes independent films in the United States as well as Canada. Minds Eye Entertainment has subsidiaries in production and international distribution through its subsidiaries QME Entertainment and Minds Eye International. As the CEO and the Chairman of the company, DeWalt has produced more than 60 films and television shows that have received more than 50 national and international awards as well as 52 nominations between the Genie Awards, Gemini Awards and Canadian Screen Award including 13 wins.

Over the years, DeWalt has held several leadership positions at various organizations within the field of film production such as the former Chairman of the Canadian Film and Television Production Association (CFTPA, now known as Canadian Media Producers Association), past president of the International Quorum of Motion Picture Producers (IQMPP), past board member of the Canada Media Fund, formerly known as Canadian Television Fund and the National Screen Institute.

In 1999, DeWalt was awarded with Chetwynd Award by Canadian Film and Television Production Association for his achievements in Canadian cinema. In the year 2002, he was awarded with the Ernst & Young Entrepreneur of the Year Award in the Media Category. Saskatchewan Motion Picture Association awarded DeWalt with the Centennial Volunteer Industry Leader award in 2005.

== Filmography ==
As Producer
| Year | Title | Cast |
|---|---|---|
| 2026 | November 1963 | John Travolta Mandy Patinkin Dermot Mulroney Robert Carlyle Jefferson White |
| 2024 | Die Alone | Carrie-Anne Moss Douglas Smith Frank Grillo |
| 2021 | Dangerous | Scott Eastwood; Tyrese Gibson; Famke Janssen; Kevin Durand; Mel Gibson |
| 2020 | Endless | Alexandra Shipp; Famke Janssen |
| 2019 | A Score to Settle | Nicolas Cage; Benjamin Bratt |
| 2019 | Daughter of the Wolf | Gina Carano; Richard Dreyfuss |
| 2018 | Distorted | Christina Ricci; John Cusack |
| 2017 | The Humanity Bureau | Nicolas Cage |
| 2017 | The Recall | Wesley Snipes; RJ Mitte |
| 2015 | Forsaken | Kiefer Sutherland; Donald Sutherland |
| 2012 | 13 Eerie | Katharine Isabelle; Brendan Fehr; Michael Shanks |
| 2012 | The Tall Man | Jessica Biel; Jodelle Ferland; Stephen McHattie |
| 2011 | Faces In The Crowd | Milla Jovovich; Julian McMahon |
| 2010 | Lullaby for Pi | Rupert Friend; Clémence Poésy |
| 2009 | Dolan's Cadillac | Christian Slater; Emmanuelle Vaugier; Wes Bentley |
| 2009 | Grace | Jordan Ladd |
| 2009 | Walled In | Mischa Barton |
| 1999 | Something More | Michael A. Goorjian |
| 1998 | Stranger in Town | Harry Hamlin |
| 1997 | The Lost Daughter | Richard Chamberlain; Helmut Griem |

As Executive Producer
| Year | Title | Cast |
|---|---|---|
| 2020 | Menendez: The Day of the Lord | Dolores Heredia |
| 2017 | School Spirits | Tiffany Alvord |
| 2013 | Stranded | Christian Slater; Brendan Fehr |
| 2012 | 13 Eerie | Katharine Isabelle; Brendan Fehr; Michael Shanks |
| 2010 | Ticket Out | Ray Liotta; Billy Burke |
| 2009 | The Shortcut | Katrina Bowden; Dave Franco |
| 2004 | Intern Academy | Dave Thomas; Dan Aykroyd |
| 2004 | Seven Times Lucky | Kevin Pollak; Liane Balaban |
| 2003 | Falling Angels | Callum Keith Rennie |
| 2003 | One Last Dance | Patrick Swayze; Lisa Niemi |
| 2001 | The Unsaid | Andy Garcia |
| 2001 | Viva Las Nowhere | Daniel Stern; James Caan |
| 1999 | Held Up | Jamie Foxx; Nia Long |
| 1999 | Something More | Michael A. Goorjian |
| 1998 | Stranger in Town | Harry Hamlin |
| 1995 | Decoy | Peter Weller; Robert Patrick |
| 1994 | Guitarman | Shawn Ashmore; Nicholas Campbell |

Television production
| Year | Title | Notes |
|---|---|---|
| 2012 | Around the Next Bend | A 12-episode travel documentary and adventure series for HiFiHDtv. |
| 2010 | Hollywood: Saskatchewan | A 26-episode documentary series for SCN. |
| 2008 | The Englishman's Boy | A two-part dramatic mini-series for CBC Television. |
| 2006 | Prairie Giant: The Tommy Douglas Story | A two-part dramatic mini-series for CBC Television. |
| 2002 | 2030 CE | A 26-episode drama series for YTV. |
| 2001 | Just Cause | A 22-episode legal drama series produced for PAX (W Network). |
| 2001 | MythQuest | A 13-episode drama series produced for PBS. |
| 1998 | Prairie Berry Pie | A 26-episode children's series produced for Global Television Network. |
| 1998 | Mentors | A 52-episode drama series produced for Family Channel. |
| 1997 | Incredible Story Studio | A 65-episode drama series for YTV. |

- Source: DeWalt's Filmography at IMDb
