= A Score to Settle =

2019 film by Shawn Ku

- Theatrical release poster
- Directed by: Shawn Ku
- Screenplay by: John Stuart Newman
- Produced by: Kevin DeWalt; Eric Gozlan; Danielle Masters
- Starring: Nicolas Cage; Benjamin Bratt
- Cinematography: Mark Dobrescu
- Edited by: Chad Galster
- Music by: John Kaefer
- Production companies: Highland Film Group; GoldRush Entertainment; Minds Eye Entertainment; Paragon Media Production; Saturn Films; Ingenious Media
- Distributed by: RLJE Films
- Release date: August 2, 2019 (United States)
- Running time: 103 minutes
- Country: United States
- Language: English
- Box office: $171,216

A Score to Settle is a 2019 American action thriller film directed by Shawn Ku. It stars Nicolas Cage and Benjamin Bratt. It was released on August 2, 2019, by RLJE Films.

== Plot ==
In 2001, Frank Carver, a young gangster for a mob enforcer named Max, witnesses his boss execute a former ally. Frank is asked to take the fall for the crime in return for $450,000 and the promise that his son, Joey, be looked after and cared for after the death of Frank's wife, Lorraine. However, his originally promised six-year stay in prison turns into a life sentence.

Nineteen years later, Frank is released from prison after he is diagnosed with a case of insomnia that could kill him if he doesn't sleep. While walking, he is met by Joey, now an adult, who reveals that he is a recovering addict and has sold his car to pay off his drug debts. After the two hail a cab, they stop by the old Carver household where Frank unearths the $450,000 bounty promised to him years ago. He takes the money and promises Joey that he'll make up for lost time. Joey, reluctant to spend what is essentially "blood money", later agrees in order to spend time with his father. That night, after checking in to a lavish hotel, Frank, against his doctor's orders, tracks down his friend Q, who was also involved in Max's crime syndicate. Q, having left that life behind him and now a successful bar owner, makes peace with Frank.

The following day, Frank and Joey spend time together buying suits, a sports car, and a new smartphone. They are approached by a pimp named Trip, who tries to show them a good time, but Frank declines. Inside the hotel, Joey encourages Frank to flirt with a woman named Simone. Simone turns out to be a prostitute and has sex with Frank in his suite, but ends up developing romantic feelings for him after he explains to her the deal he made with Sleepy and how it affected him.

That night, Frank tracks down Max's second in command, Jimmy, to a nearby massage parlor, with Jimmy managing to escape before Frank can kill him. The next morning, Frank confesses to Joey that he is still "in the game," prompting Joey to turn his back on Frank. Later, after killing one of Max's subordinates (Tank) at a nearby butcher, Frank collapses in his suite due to exhaustion, and is nearly killed by Trip, who reveals that Simone was one of his prostitutes and demands Frank pay him what he feels is owed to him. Frank threatens Trip with his life, scaring him into running away.

Frank gets a call from Joey who started shooting up again. Frank rescues Joey and they reconcile. They decide to stop by the cemetery where Lorraine is buried, and, while there, Frank also walks by Joey's headstone as well, revealing that "Joey" was a figment of Frank's imagination. Frank comes to terms that Max and his men killed Joey to keep him quiet, while Joey's spirit tries convincing his dad to "come home".

Despite his son's last wishes, Frank locates Max at a nearby assisted living center, where he has been in a medically induced coma for the last 15 years. Frank ultimately decides to spare Max's life, not before leaving the bloodied baseball bat that Max had used the night of the execution on his body. One of the orderlies tells Frank that the only other person to have visited Max before him was Q, although he has not been seen in a long while. As Frank leaves the center, Jimmy starts to fire at him, though Frank gets the upper hand and shoots Jimmy dead in the parking lot.

Frank then heads to a nearby church, where Q's daughter is getting married. Frank holds Q and his daughter hostage, with Q revealing that he was the man who had Joey killed. He explains that Joey had become an unstable drug addict and was going to snitch on Max's gang to the police, forcing Q to cover his tracks. Frank spares Q, just before his daughter shoots Frank in the back. Outside, police tell Frank to surrender, but Frank refuses, deciding to go out in a "blaze of glory". As Frank lies dying on the steps to the church, Joey's spirit comforts his dad, as he helps lead him into the next life.

== Cast ==
- Nicolas Cage as Frank
- Nicole G. Leier as Sleepy's Daughter
- Mohamed Karim as Jimmy
- Benjamin Bratt as Q
- Ian Tracey as Tank
- Karolina Wydra as Simone
- Nicole Muñoz as Isha
- Noah LeGros as Joey

== Production ==
In October 2017, it was reported Nicolas Cage had agreed to star in the independently produced action film A Score to Settle for Highland Film Group which would be presented to potential buyers at that year's American Film Market in November. Shawn Ku was set to direct from a script by John Newman and Christian Swegal.

Filming locations are in British Columbia, Canada.

== Release ==
In April 2019, RLJE Films acquired distribution rights to the film and set it for an August 2, 2019, release.

== Reception ==
On review aggregator Rotten Tomatoes, the film holds an approval rating of 16% based on 19 reviews, with an average rating of 3.8/10. Metacritic gave the film a weighted average rating of 37 out of 100, based on six reviews, indicating "generally unfavorable" reviews.

Justin Lowe of The Hollywood Reporter called the film "forgettable" and "underwhelming", and said: "Ku shows a decent grasp of plot mechanics, but never manages to adequately develop the characters or effectively modulate the film’s pacing, even in the brief action scenes, which prove too tame by typical Cage standards." Noel Murray from Los Angeles Times similarly criticized the plot, action sequences, and development of underworld characters. However, he praised Cage's performance, writing: "With him, the movie isn’t just watchable, it’s occasionally riveting. ... Cage plays even the blandest pulp material with soul and gusto, as though the pathetic grudges of a petty criminal were the stuff of epic drama".
