= Laura Bilgeri =

Austrian actress and model (born 1995)

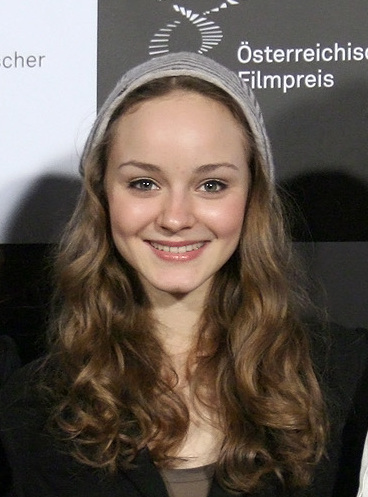
- Laura in January 2012.
- Born: Laura Bilgeri; 12 July 1995 (age 31); Vienna, Austria
- Occupation: Actress
- Years active: 2010–present
- Parent(s): Beatrix Bilgeri; Reinhold Bilgeri

Laura Bilgeri (born 12 July 1995) is an Austrian actress and model known for her supporting role in the 2017 science fiction / horror movie The Recall. She is the daughter of actress Beatrice Bilgeri and musician Reinhold Bilgeri.

== Career ==
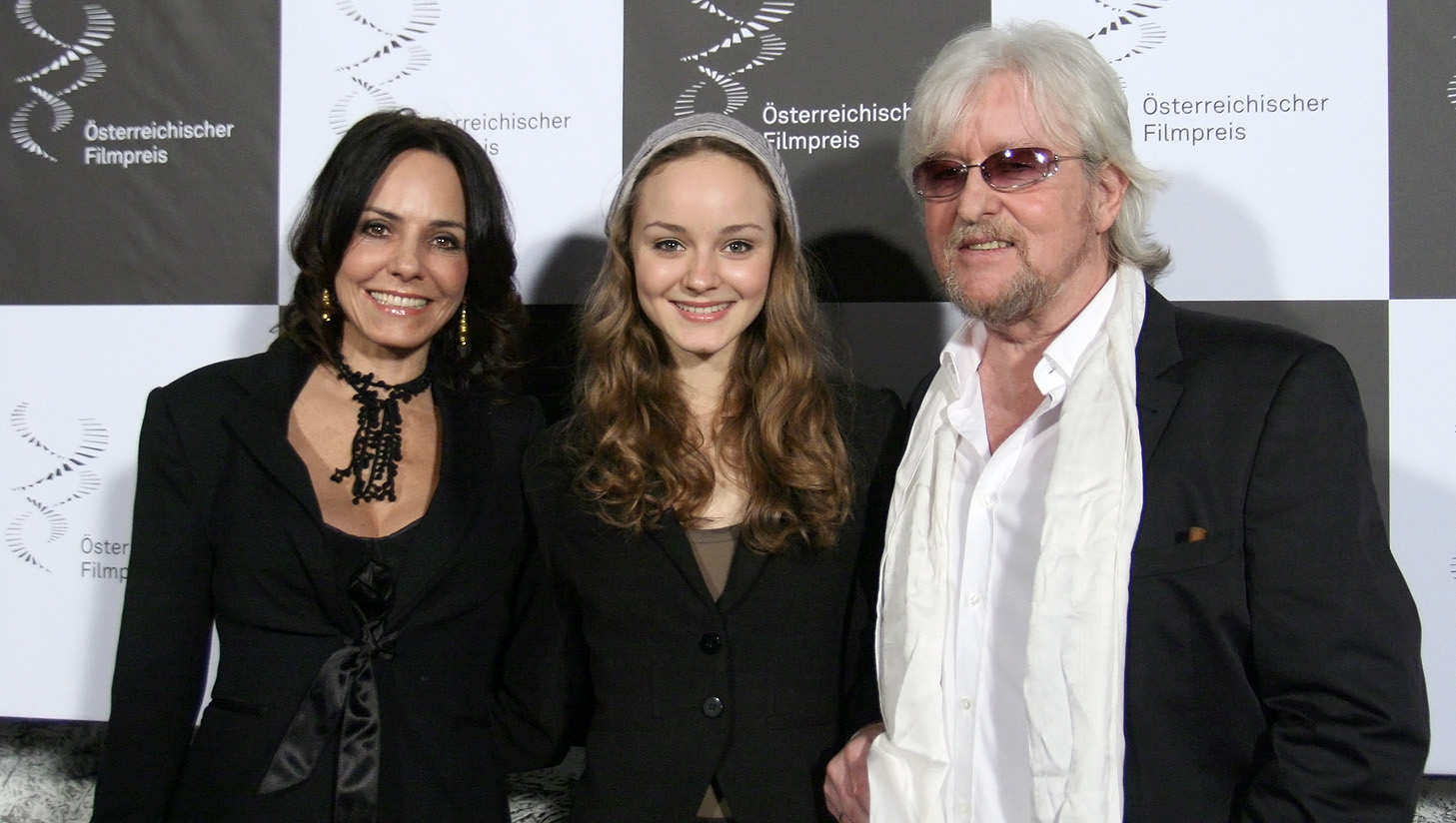
Beatrix Bilgeri-Kopf, Laura Bilgeri and Reinhold Bilgeri, Austrian Film Awards 2012 (Vienna).

Laura Bilgeri was born in Vienna and grew up in Vorarlberg. After visiting the elementary school Dornbirn- Watzenegg and the Sacré Coeur Riedenburg in Bregenz she went to Munich at the age of 15 to study acting and singing at the Abraxas Musical Academy.

Her film debut was in 2010 in the movie The Breath of Heaven by her father. At 19, she moved to Los Angeles in 2014, where she starred in the role of Sarah a year later for the movie Toby Goes To Camp. In 2016, she starred opposite Wesley Snipes in The Recall, where she played the role of Annie. In addition to her work as an actress, she also works as a model.

== Filmography ==
=== Film ===
Year	Title	Role	Notes
2010	Der Atem des Himmels	Pia	
2014	The Silent Mountain	Marie Lanz	
2016	Toby Goes to Camp	Sarah	
2017	The Recall	Annie	
2017	My Teacher, My Obsession	Riley	
2021	Tutti per Uma	Uma	

=== Television ===
Year	Title	Role	Notes
2013	Vienna Crime Squad	Johanna Krußmark	1 episode, 2013
2016	Better Things	Art Gallery Girl	1 episode, 2016
2018	iZombie	Sloane Mills	3 episodes, 2018-19
