= Bridgegate Pictures =

American film production company

Bridgegate Pictures Corp
- Company type: Public
- Industry: Motion pictures, Entertainment
- Headquarters: 30251 Golden Lantern; Laguna Niguel, California, U.S.
- Key people: Tamara Shelley (CEO and Executive Producer); Jim DiPrima (CFO)
- Products: Films, TV films
- Website: bridgegatepictures.com

Bridgegate Pictures is an American film production company and public entity trading on the OTC Markets under the ticker symbol BBGP. The company engages in the financing, development, marketing, technology, and distribution of independent feature films. It currently holds a six picture partnership deal with Mind's Eye Entertainment in association with VMI Worldwide. Their upcoming six-film picture slate will focus on sci-fi, action and thriller films. Their first production was a sci-fi thriller film The Recall based on a screenplay by Reggie Keyohara III and Sam Acton King, starring Wesley Snipes and RJ Mitte. Their second and third completed features are the thriller The Humanity Bureau, and the independent drama Distorted starring John Cusack and Christina Ricci.

== Company ==
Bridgegate Pictures' six-picture film slate with Minds Eye Entertainment was produced by Kevin Dewalt and Danielle Masters, and was executive produced by Guy Griffithe, Andre Relis and Frank White.

In July 2017, it was announced that Bridgegate was to co-produce and finance the upcoming adventure film, All Shook Up, which will include Jay DeMarcus of Rascal Flatts as a producer. Bridgegate Former President Guy Griffithe will serve as executive producer.

== Tech ==
In June 2017, Bridgegate Pictures, in association with SkyVR and Minds Eye Entertainment, announced “The Recall VR Abduction,” the thirteen-minute virtual reality companion film tied to the theatrical release of Wesley Snipes’ sci-fi thriller, The Recall.

Bridgegate Former President Griffithe was also a VR Producer for Speed Kills. He executive produced the VR for The Humanity Bureau and Distorted on their respective VR companion films. Each full-length film was shot in Barco Escape format, as well as Standard 2D format.

According to The Hollywood Reporter, "Bridgegate Pictures and VMI Worldwide lead a consortium that will finance and produce six sci-fi, action and thriller films to be shot for Barco Escape."
