= Forsaken (2015 film) =

2015 film by Jon Cassar

- Theatrical release poster
- Directed by: Jon Cassar
- Written by: Brad Mirman
- Produced by: Isabella Marchese Ragona; Bill Marks; Gary Howsam; Kevin DeWalt; Josh Miller
- Starring: Kiefer Sutherland; Donald Sutherland; Brian Cox; Michael Wincott; Demi Moore
- Cinematography: Rene Ohashi
- Edited by: Susan Shipton
- Music by: Jonathan Goldsmith
- Production companies: Minds Eye Entertainment; Panacea Entertainment; Rollercoaster Films; Moving Pictures Media
- Distributed by: Momentum Pictures (United States); Entertainment One (Canada); Universal Pictures (France)
- Release dates: September 14, 2015 (TIFF); February 19, 2016 (United States)
- Running time: 90 minutes
- Countries: Canada; France; United States
- Language: English
- Budget: $11 million

Forsaken is a 2015 revisionist Western film directed by Jon Cassar, from a screenplay by Brad Mirman. The film stars Kiefer Sutherland, Donald Sutherland, Brian Cox, Michael Wincott, Aaron Poole and Demi Moore. The film had its world premiere at the Toronto International Film Festival on September 16, 2015. The film was released on February 19, 2016. One of the executive producers on the film was Doug Falconer.

== Plot ==
A flashback shows a young boy, recently dead, and his distraught mother. John Henry Clayton returns home to his father, Reverend Samuel Clayton, who informs him his mother died some years ago. John Henry was unaware, as he had been drifting for 10 years following his time fighting in the American Civil War. John Henry and Samuel are estranged because Samuel is ashamed of his son's supposed exploits following the War. He goes to town with his father who warns him to avoid some suspicious men; their leader, saloon owner James McCurdy worries that John Henry will be a "problem". John Henry also encounters his past lover, Mary Alice, whom he learns is married and has a son.

After a tense encounter in town with Frank Tillman, John Henry and his father argue about his exploits and lack of faith in God following the atrocities of the Civil War. McCurdy's gang, along with "Gentleman" Dave Turner, rides to a farm to coerce a man to leave. Another cowboy murders the man, to Dave's dismay and Dave kills him in return. Sometime later, when Frank goes to another farm to remove its owner, others in town ambush them. McCurdy grows increasingly aggressive in his attempts to displace the local landowners to suppress their rebellion. In town, Tom Watson (Mary Alice's husband) sees her talking with John Henry; John Henry has yet another run-in with McCurdy's gang and allows a man named Ned to beat him without retaliation. Tom is angered when Mary Alice rides off to nurse John Henry.

Now concerned about his wife's feelings, Tom is persuaded by McCurdy to simply sell his land and move away so that John Henry could not "steal" his wife. Dave Turner warns John Henry not to get involved in the land scheme and they discover that they were both at the Battle of Shiloh, albeit on opposite sides. That Sunday, John Henry finally attends his father's church service where Tom angrily demands that he deny loving Mary Alice and John Henry silently leaves. Tom tries to get out of the deal with McCurdy, realizing he cannot change John Henry's feelings but is refused. John Henry returns to the church, where he tearfully admits to his father that after the War, he accidentally shot and killed a boy with a stray shot in a self-defense gunfight. He is haunted by the memory of that boy and his brother William, who accidentally died when he fell in a freezing river. Samuel forgives and comforts him.

McCurdy threatens Mary Alice, convinced that Tom is still bound by their deal. So Mary Alice pleads with John Henry to help her but he refuses. Samuel then appeals to McCurdy to leave Tom's family alone but is also refused. When he leaves, Ned stabs him in the back in an alley. John Henry stays with him until he regains consciousness, then informs him that he must end the violence in town. John Henry retrieves his gun, borrows another from the town's merchant, and enters the saloon, killing Ned first. A gunfight ensues and ends with him killing Frank and the rest of McCurdy's gang. Outside, Dave Turner regretfully states that his job is to kill John Henry. Having dropped his own gun and now only holding the heavier, borrowed gun, John Henry asks if he can return to the saloon to retrieve it - Dave agrees. Inside, John Henry shoots McCurdy, who falls from the balcony in front of Dave. Now unemployed, Dave and John Henry part ways peacefully.

Having now re-established his reputation as a gunslinger, John Henry informs a tearful Samuel that he must leave to avoid bringing bounty hunters and challengers to the town. He promises to return but according to Dave Turner's final voiceover, only returns once a few years later to affix a ribbon Mary Alice gave him before the war to her gravestone, a few times on the sly, perhaps to visit his father and then never again after his father's death.

== Cast ==
- Kiefer Sutherland as John Henry Clayton
- Donald Sutherland as Rev. Samuel Clayton
- Brian Cox as James McCurdy
- Michael Wincott as Gentleman Dave Turner
- Aaron Poole as Frank Tillman
- Demi Moore as Mary Alice Watson
- Greg Ellis as Tom Watson
- Siobhan Williams as Emily Chadwick
- Dylan Smith as Little Ned
- Chris Ippolito as Bob Waters
- Landon Liboiron as Will Pickard
- Wesley Morgan as Sam Hatch
- Christopher Rosamond as Daniel Peterson
- Michael Therriault as Doc Miller

== Production ==
Kiefer Sutherland and Jon Cassar, who directed 58 episodes of Sutherland's TV series 24 had discussed for years the idea of doing a Western film together. Sutherland eventually commissioned Brad Mirman to write a screenplay for such a film, to co-star Sutherland's father, veteran actor Donald Sutherland. While the two had appeared together in two films previously—Max Dugan Returns (1983) and A Time to Kill (1996)—they had never shared a scene. Produced for $20 million, it began shooting in July 2013 at the CL Ranch in Springbank, Alberta, near Calgary, and was wrapped by September. It was also announced that Kevin DeWalt would produce under his Minds Eye Entertainment banner, with Josh Miller also producing under his Panacea Entertainment banner.

Principal photography began in July 2013, in Calgary, with a budget of $11 million.

In June 2015, some actors who had worked on the film two years earlier under ACTRA Alberta contracts, but who were still owed wages, were paid. The following month, approximately 100 members of the crew union IATSE local 212 and of the Directors Guild of Canada were in the process of being paid a total of $300,000 still owed. The Alberta Labour Relations Board had ruled in April 2015 that the production companies—Redemption Alberta Inc., Redemption Productions Inc., Panacea Entertainment Inc., Regina's Minds Eye Entertainment Ltd., and Kiefer Sutherland's Camel Entertainment Inc.—would not be allowed to access approximately $1.7-million in Alberta Film Grant money until issues with the film's workers and suppliers were resolved.

== Release ==
Forsaken had its world premiere at the Toronto International Film Festival during its 40th anniversary, on September 16, 2015. Prior to the film's premiere at the festival, Momentum Pictures acquired U.S distribution rights to the film. It then went onto screen at the Zurich Film Festival on September 25, 2015, where Kiefer Sutherland won The Golden Eye Award. The film was released in the United States on February 19, 2016.

== Reception ==
The film received mixed reviews from critics. On the review aggregator website Rotten Tomatoes, 40% of 42 critics' reviews are positive, with an average rating of 5.4/10. Metacritic, which uses a weighted average, assigned the film a score of 55 out of 100, based on 17 critics, indicating "mixed or average" reviews.

Glenn Kenny of RogerEbert.com gave the film three out of four stars and wrote, "It has a solid story to tell, and tells it with no winks and few, if any, frills. It's involving and ultimately exciting."

=== Accolades ===
The film was nominated for 5 categories at the 4th Canadian Screen Awards: Art direction/Production design, cinematography, costume design, make-up and sound editing.
