= ScreenX =

Panoramic film format

- Logo used since 2024

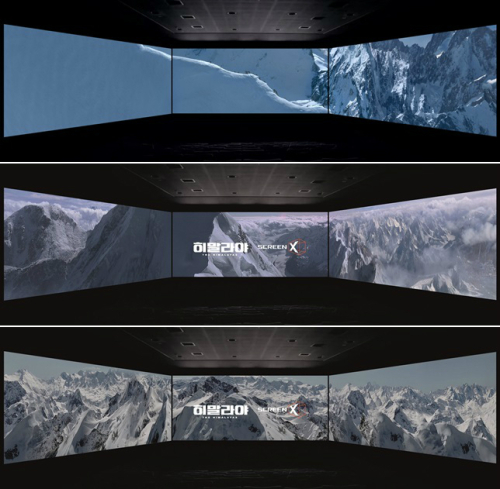
- Type: Panoramic film presentation system
- Inception: 2012
- Manufacturer: CJ 4DPlex, subsidiary of CJ CGV
- Available: Yes
- Website: https://cj4dplex.com/screenx

ScreenX (stylized in all caps since 2024) is a panoramic film format which presents films with an expanded, dual-sided, 270-degree screen projected on the walls in a theater. First used in 2012, it is designed by CJ 4DPlex, a subsidiary of the CJ CGV group, which also designed the 4DX motion-theater technology. A combination of both formats is known as Ultra 4DX.

As of 2022, the theater technology is installed in 364 screens in 37 countries.

== Overview ==
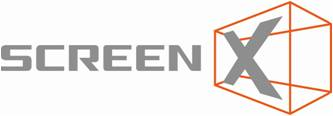
This logo was used until 2019.

This logo was used from 2019 to 2024; its design is similar to its sister format, 4DX

As for IMAX films, to match the length of the entire multi-screen theater, ScreenX films are formatted either during filming in production or converted in post-production. A film shot for ScreenX is typically shot with three cameras. The process is done through scene selecting, archiving, delivering assets, color grading, and mastering before distribution to theaters.

Most ScreenX films are live-action. Only select animated films are ever produced for the format. The technology has been rarely produced for Hollywood studio films due to the complexity of the additional CGI work as side footage. Lee Jae-seon, who collaborated for the ScreenX version of King Arthur: Legend of the Sword at G-node, said that, "It is not easy to create Hollywood blockbuster CGI work in Korea, but it is meaningful because we created Hollywood blockbuster CGI work for ScreenX.” Films were initially shown only in selected locations due to the lack of partners at the time.

On December 13, 2019, the world's largest ScreenX auditorium was inaugurated at the Màgic Badalona shopping center in Badalona, Spain. It has a capacity of 398 seats. India got its first ScreenX in July 2019 at INOX Megaplex at Mumbai, Maharashtra.

Director Destin Daniel Cretton revealed that the ScreenX team assisted principal photography of his second MCU film, Spider-Man: Brand New Day (2026), to natively film select sequences for the panoramic format. CJ 4DPlex later introduced a new initiative called “Shot for ScreenX,” which will be shown in its immersive 270-degree cinemas. Created specifically for the company’s screens, the multi-projection format extends selected scenes beyond the standard frame and onto the side walls of the auditorium, delivering a panoramic viewing experience. Cretton's Spider-Man: Brand New Day is the first project in which the company worked with the filmmakers from production through distribution to develop imagery and other elements tailored specifically for ScreenX.

== Ultra 4DX ==
Ultra 4DX (formerly 4DX with ScreenX from 2017 to 2019, and 4DX Screen until 2024) is the combination of 4DX and ScreenX film formats which presents films in a multi-screen auditorium with enhanced motion and environmental effects, with an additional fourth-screen projected on the ceiling and the newest 4DX chair models. It debuted in Yongsan in 2017, and was internationally unveiled at CinemaCon 2018, and later at CES 2020. The combined film format is currently operating throughout Asian territories including South Korea, Japan, China and India. It later opened its first theater in a non-Asian location at a Les Cinémas Gaumont Pathé theater in Paris, France. It later made its overseas debut at a Cinépolis theater in Mexico City, Mexico in March 2020.

== Four-sided ScreenX ==
CGV, in collaboration with its subsidiary CJ 4DPlex, opened the world's first four-sided ScreenX theater at the CGV Yongsan Park Mall in South Korea on January 24, 2025. In addition to the front, left, and right screens standard for the ScreenX format, it also has a screen on the ceiling. It is also the first ScreenX theater in South Korea to feature Dolby Atmos sound technology, offering a more immersive and rich sound experience. In addition, all seats are equipped with recliners, allowing use of the four-sided screen with a wider field of view.

== RealD partnership ==
On December 17, 2025, CJ 4DPlex and RealD announced a strategic partnership where they integrate RealD 3D technology into ScreenX theaters to deliver "a next-level premium theatrical experience that surrounds audiences in expanded visuals and crystal-clear depth." Their partnership has scaled rapidly with Regal Cinemas that holiday season, in commemoration with the release of Avatar: Fire and Ash. This dual format offers filmmakers "a broader creative canvas and moviegoers a new level of spectacle that can only be experienced in theatres."

== Reception ==
=== Box office ===
Since 2018, ScreenX technology has been successful at worldwide box offices, following the successful panoramic release of Marvel Studios's Black Panther. It has grossed a combined total of over $40 million throughout the year through films released in the panoramic format.

In 2022, ScreenX achieved even more box office success, with Top Gun: Maverick as the highest-grossing release.

=== Awards ===
- 2018: 'ScreenX' won the 2018 ShowEast "Innovator of the Year" award.
- 2018: '4DX with ScreenX' won the Silver Prize at the 2018 Edison Awards for "Media, Visual Communications & Entertainment".
- 2019: 'ScreenX' won "Technology of the Year" at the 2019 Cinema Technology Community Awards.
- 2019: '4DX with ScreenX' won the iResearch Award for "Originative Cinema Technology".

== See also ==
- Cosm (company)
- Barco Escape – a similar multi-screen theater which is now closed
- 4DX
- IMAX
- Dolby Cinema
- CJ CGV
- Cinerama – a similar technique from the 1950s
- Circle-Vision 360°
- Virtual reality
