= TomSka =

British YouTuber and filmmaker (born 1990)

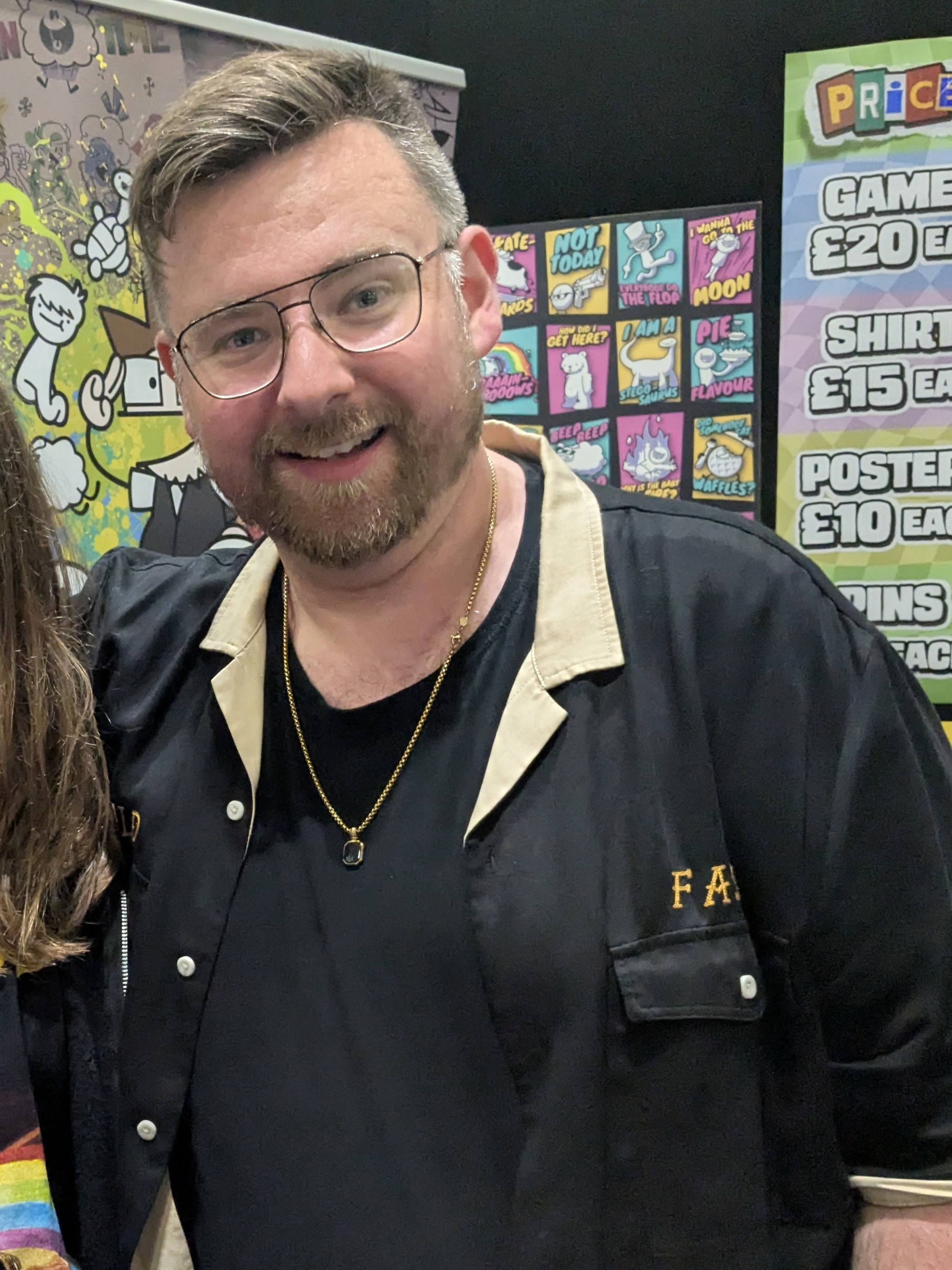
- Ridgewell in 2025
- Born: Thomas James Ridgewell; 27 June 1990 (age 36); Suffolk, England
- Education: University of Lincoln
- Occupations: YouTuber; filmmaker; vlogger; video essayist; actor
- Partner(s): Charlie Belle (2016–present; engaged)

YouTube information
- Channels: TomSka; TomSka & Friends
- Years active: 2002–present
- Genres: Comedy; sketch comedy; action; black comedy; surreal comedy; slapstick; adult animation
- Subscribers: 7.46 million (main channel); 8.92 million (combined) (Note: Subscribers, broken down by channel: 7.56 million (TomSka) 1.56 million (TomSka & Friends))
- Views: 2.13 billion (main channel); 2.38 billion (combined) (Note: Views, broken down by channel: 2.13 billion (TomSka) 253 million (TomSka & Friends))
- Last updated: 12 Jan 2026

Thomas James Ridgewell (born 27 June 1990), known online as TomSka, is an English YouTuber, filmmaker and actor. He is known for writing, directing, producing and starring in live-action sketch comedy YouTube videos, video essays and animated web series such as Eddsworld (2005–2016), asdfmovie (/ˈæsdəfmuːvi/ AS-dəf-moo-vee; 2008–present) and Crash Zoom (2015–present). He served as showrunner of Eddsworld from 2012 to 2016. As of September 2026, his YouTube channel has over 7.57 million subscribers, and his videos have garnered over 2.1 billion views.

== Early life and education ==
Thomas James Ridgewell was born on 27 June 1990 to parents Duncan and Leslie Ridgewell in Suffolk, England. His twin sister Amelia died prenatally after Ridgewell's mother was injured in a car accident. He was raised as a Jehovah's Witness, in Essex until age 4 and later Cambridge. As a child, Ridgewell made short films using his parents' video camera.

Shortly after YouTube was established, Ridgewell created CakeBomb, a website where he posted his projects, including his animated web series Asdfmovie and his late friend Edd Gould's Eddsworld. Ridgewell graduated from the University of Lincoln, where he studied Media Production having previously studied at Long Road Sixth Form College in Cambridge, and whilst studying created a series of unofficial advertisements for the university, which received millions of views and were also featured on the BBC.

== Internet career ==
As a professional YouTuber, Ridgewell earns money from revenue from his videos on the website. Ridgewell engages in social commentary through his YouTube channel, covering topics such as mental health and personal relationships. From April 2016 to February 2018, he uploaded weekly vlogs to his second channel, DarkSquidge, now known as TomSka & Friends, in a series named Last Week.

On 17 January 2012, Ridgewell founded the media production company TurboPunch Limited, located in London. He currently works there alongside YouTuber and writer Eddie Bowley. Ridgewell also became the producer of Eddsworld after the show's creator, Edd Gould, died of leukaemia. He left the series in 2016, relinquishing the show to animator Matt Hargreaves.

In February 2013, Ridgewell was featured on the cover of Wired UK as part of a feature titled "How YouTube Reinvented the Entertainment Business". In May 2013, he was featured in YouTube's first and only Comedy Week as a guest host for its Geek Week series in August. French television channel Canal+'s Le Grand Journal adapted Ridgewell's 2012 sketch "Meanwhile" as part of its permanent Pendant ce temps segment from its 10th season onwards the same year, to which he was credited as the creator and given financial compensation.

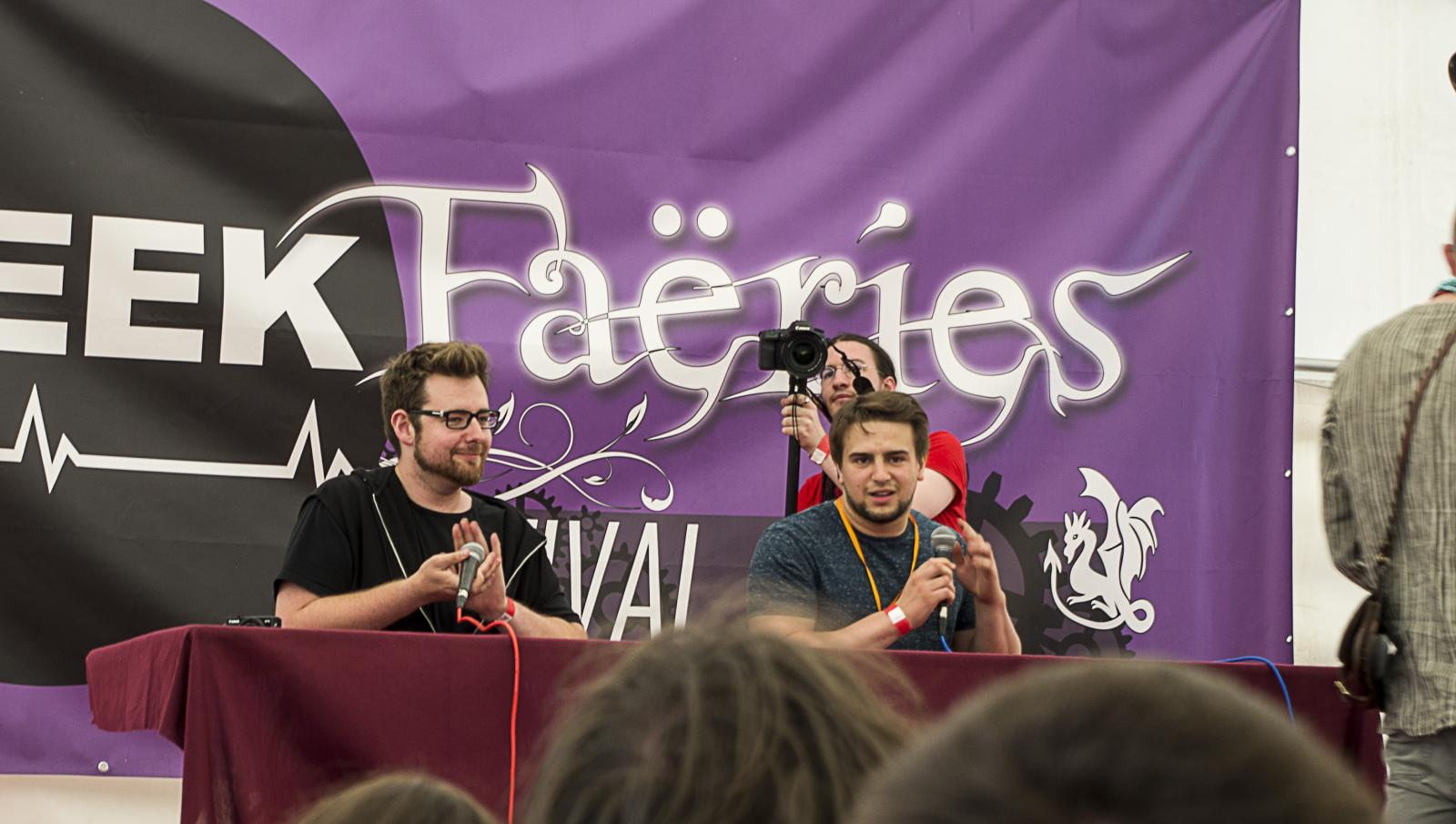
Ridgewell (left) and regular collaborator Sammy Paul in 2016

In 2016, Ridgewell filmed several sketches with the BBC for a potential sketch show on BBC Three. A book titled Sam Kills Christmas, written by Ridgewell and Eddie Bowley with illustrations by Dorina Herdewijn, was released on 8 November 2018.

== asdfmovie ==
Asdfmovie (/ˈæsdəfmuːvi/ AS-dəf-moo-vee, stylised in all lowercase) is a British independent-animated sketch comedy web series created, written, directed by, and starring Ridgewell. The series features short clips of minimalist characters in surreal and occasionally darkly humorous situations. 16 total main episodes have been released on YouTube, as well as many compilations of deleted scenes and an Asdfmovie spin-off video named "marmite is terrible (asdfmite)".

In October 2015, Ridgewell released his book based on the asdfmovie series, Art is Dead: the asdf book, illustrated by Matt Ley and published by Little Brown 5. In 2017, the song "Beep Beep I'm a Sheep" by Canadian musician LilDeuceDeuce, with vocals by Ridgewell and Gabriel Brown, was featured in the dance rhythm game Just Dance 2018.

In May 2018, Ridgewell uploaded "The Muffin Song", a spin-off song of his asdfmovie series, in collaboration with Schmoyoho. As of January 2026, the video has garnered over 278 million views. In 2019, Ridgewell developed a card game based on asdfmovie in collaboration with Big Potato Games called Muffin Time: The Random Card Game. He raised over £1,000,000 for the game on Kickstarter. A second game, Don't Press That Mine Turtle, raised over £300,000 on Kickstarter.

== Personal life ==
He was raised a Jehovah's Witness but no longer practices this faith. Despite this, he has expressed belief in a higher power.

Ridgewell has been open about his struggles with grief, following the death of his creative partner Edd Gould in 2012, and was diagnosed with severe depression in 2013.

He endorsed the Labour Party in the 2017 United Kingdom general election and expressed his opposition to both Brexit and the Conservative Party.

In 2021, he was diagnosed with attention deficit hyperactivity disorder.

On 26 December 2023, Charlie Belle, his long-term partner, announced via Instagram that they had become engaged. Ridgewell later revealed he had proposed on Christmas.

== Filmography ==
=== Web series ===
Year	Title	Role	Notes
2005–2016	Eddsworld	Tom	Also showrunner (Eddsworld Legacy), writer, director, producer, and composer
2008–present	Asdfmovie	Various roles	Also creator, writer, director, and producer
2012	Dick Figures	Mash	Episode 39, "The Fart Knight Rises"
2013	Project: Library	Young Troy Bennet (Episode 2, "Dinosaur")	Also executive producer
2014–2016	Don't Hug Me I'm Scared	Magnet (Episode 6)	Also executive producer (Episodes 3–6)
2015–present	Crash Zoom	Ben	Also creator, writer, director, and producer
2015–2021	Cyanide & Happiness Shorts	Agent 7	3 episodes
2016	Whipped	Jeff	
2016	YouTube Rewind: The Ultimate 2016 Challenge	Himself	
2016–2018, 2019, 2020	Last Week	Himself	Also creator
2017	YouTube Rewind: The Shape of 2017	Himself	
2018–2019, 2023–2024	Last Month	Himself	Also creator
2018–2020, 2021–present	#CONTENT	Himself	Also creator
2021–present	TryHards	Himself	Also co-creator
2022	Unfinished London	Marc Isambard Brunel	Episode: "Tower Bridge could have looked very different"
2024–2025	Battle for Dream Island	Pineapple	4 episodes
2026	Battle for Dream Island	Ruler	Voice of a contestant

=== Short films ===
Year	Title	Role	Notes
2012	Ellie Heart	Executive producer	Special Thanks
2015	Primitive Correctness	Ugh	Also writer and director
2016	Away	Executive Producer	N/A
2016	Friend Like Me	Jirard the Pizza Guy	N/A
2017	Self-Conscious Computer	N/A	Special thanks
2021	The Last Union	N/A	Special thanks
2022	Maker's End	Mr. Piss and other various roles	Also creator, writer and director

=== Feature films ===
Year	Title	Role
2013	Dick Figures: The Movie	French Cop (voice)
2015	Dude Bro Party Massacre III	Chaz Noodlemen
2020	Royalty Free: The Music of Kevin MacLeod	Himself

=== Video games ===
Year	Title	Role	Notes
2014	KatataK	Creator	
2018	Frostpunk	Various roles	
2021	MADNESS: Project Nexus		Special thanks

=== Podcasts ===
Year	Platform	Title	Episode	Notes
2014	Rhett & Link's podcast	TomSka - Ear Biscuits	E45	
2024	rss.com	TomSka and Friends Custom Patreon Podcast	S01E01	

== Bibliography ==
- Ridgewell, Thomas (2010). Asdfbook.
- Ridgewell, Thomas (2010–2011). Zack Comic.
- Ridgewell, Thomas (2015). Art Is Dead, the asdf book. Little Brown Book Group. ISBN 978-0-7515-6304-7.
- Ridgewell, Thomas (2018). Sam Kills Christmas. Little Brown Book Group. ISBN 978-0-7515-6305-4.
