= Edd Gould =

British animator (1988–2012)

- Gould in 2009
- Born: Edward Duncan Ernest Gould; 28 October 1988; Isleworth, London, England
- Died: 25 March 2012 (aged 23)
- Cause of death: Infection caused by acute lymphoblastic leukemia
- Burial place: Mortlake Crematorium
- Education: Orleans Park School; University for the Creative Arts
- Occupations: Animator; cartoonist; artist; voice actor
- Years active: 1998–2012
- Known for: Eddsworld; asdfmovie

YouTube information
- Channel: Eddsworld
- Years active: 2006–2012 (Note: Since Gould's death in 2012, the Eddsworld channel has been maintained by his family and friends Tom Ridgewell (TomSka) and Matt Hargreaves.)
- Genres: Animation; comedy
- Website: eddsworld.co.uk

Edward Duncan Ernest "Edd" Gould (28 October 1988 – 25 March 2012) was a British animator, cartoonist, artist, and voice actor. He created Eddsworld, a Flash animator and web comic franchise featuring fictionalised versions of himself and longtime collaborators Tom Ridgewell, Matt Hargreaves, Tord Larsson and others.

After Gould's death, production of Eddsworld was passed on to Ridgewell who directed a run of further episodes under the title of Eddsworld: Legacy. Following Ridgewell's departure from the series in 2016, it was passed to Hargreaves and Gould's family, returning in 2020 as Eddsworld Beyond.

== Early life ==
Gould was born on 28 October 1988, in Isleworth, Greater London, to Susan and Duncan Gould. His paternal grandfather Graydon Gould (1937–2020) was a Canadian-born actor known for starring in a 1959 British made-for-television play "South", the TV series The Forest Rangers and Supercar and the film Mission: Impossible (1996). He had a sister, Victoria "Vicky" (born 18 October 1985); and two brothers, George (born August 1990) and James (born February 1984). He also has two half-siblings, Nat & Eadie Gould (born April 2000 & 2002). He attended the Orleans Park School as depicted in his first Newgrounds entry "Edd" and met Matt Hargreaves during a sports day event, who was then transferred into his class. Gould would often incorporate his friends into his comics, and Hargreaves became a prominent part of Eddsworld.

Gould met Tom Ridgewell, a fan of his work, online shortly after he started making animations involving stick figures. He likewise met Tord Larsson, a Norwegian artist, online. Ridgewell and Larsson were included in the Eddsworld cast along with Hargreaves, appearing in the animated entry Eddsworld Christmas Special 2004.

== Career ==
In 2000, Gould began animating using a GIF program to publish his works on Stick Figure Death Theatre, an online animation community. When the website stopped accepting GIFs, he spent seven months learning how to use Macromedia Flash with help from tutorials by animator Lavalle Lee. Gould published his first animation on Stick Figure Death Theatre and Stick Suicide called “Bendee 1” on 7 November 2002. Gould made his first Newgrounds entry on 6 June 2003, titled "Edd."

In September 2008, Gould began studying as an independent animator at the University for the Creative Arts in Maidstone, moving into student accommodation with his childhood friend Hargreaves. He joined Cake Bomb, a creative media group founded by Ridgewell. He voiced the "I Like Trains" kid in TomSka's asdfmovie series on YouTube, and animated the second episode of asdfmovie.

=== Cultural impact ===
Gould's YouTube channel saw a spike in popularity during the late 2000s and early 2010s, which led to numerous collaborations and business opportunities. He and Ridgewell were requested to produce an episode of Eddsworld promoting climate change awareness for the 2009 United Nations Climate Change Conference in Copenhagen. Gould and Ridgewell were featured in a televised interview on BBC Look North for their "Climate Change" episode. In 2010, Gould was commissioned to animate a short voiced by British double act Mitchell and Webb titled "Almeratron" for the BBC Comedy website. Gould also received a multitude of offers to work in television or adapt Eddsworld into a TV series, which he would decline in favor of internet production.

== Illness and death ==
On 16 April 2011, Gould revealed in a video that he had been diagnosed with acute lymphoblastic leukemia, a cancer that targets white blood cells. He posted the video on YouTube (entitled "Edd vs Cancer"), featuring himself, Ridgewell, and Hargreaves discussing the diagnosis. He platformed his illness for several sketches on his friends' YouTube accounts, and continued to animate Eddsworld while he was physically able.

It was his second diagnosis after a period of remission; he had been previously diagnosed with the same illness on 30 January 2006.

On 25 March 2012, Gould died at the age of 23 from a recurring infection caused by the cancer. Ridgewell and Hargreaves announced Gould's death in a short video two days later. His funeral was held on 10 April at All Saints' Church in Isleworth, where a eulogy compiled from video clips from fans and friends was shown.

The last episode he directed for Eddsworld, "Space Face (Part 1)", was released posthumously to YouTube on 2 June 2012. Production of Eddsworld passed to Ridgewell who continued to produce episodes as part of Gould's will until his departure in 2016. Under Ridgewell's direction, profits went to CLIC Sargent (now Young Lives vs Cancer), a UK cancer charity supporting children, young people and their families. After the release of the final Eddsworld: Legacy episode "The End (Part 2)", control of the series was handed to Hargreaves and Gould's family. Beginning in 2020, uploads continued on YouTube as Eddsworld Beyond under the direction of Hargreaves, with Edd's family contributing by voicing characters. Hargreaves later left the show in 2026.

Gould was cremated and buried at Mortlake Crematorium. In June 2012, Hargreaves and Ridgewell attended VidCon in Los Angeles and scattered some of Gould's ashes near the Hollywood Sign.

== Filmography ==
Year	Title	Creator	Writer	Animator	Actor	Role	Further details
c. 2002-2005	Bendee Stick	Yes	Yes	Yes	Yes	Bendee Stick; Various Characters	Internet animation series
2004–present (original); 2016 (archival recording)	Eddsworld	Yes	Yes	Yes	Yes	Edd; Various Characters	Internet animation series and YouTube channel
2008–2011 (original); 2015–2018 (archival recording)	TomSka/asdfmovie			Yes	Yes	Ryan The "I Like Trains" Kid; Various Characters	YouTube channel
2009–2012	Slomozovo				Yes	Himself	YouTube channel
2010–2012	InkyKeyboard/Matt Lobster				Yes	Himself	YouTube channel
2011	Action Bunnies (RageNineteen)				Yes	Various Characters	Internet animation series
2011	Skeff (Paul ter Voorde)				Yes	Narrator	Internet animation sketch
