= Tuschinski Theatre =

Movie theatre in Amsterdam, Netherlands

Koninklijk Theater Tuschinski
- Pathé Tuschinski
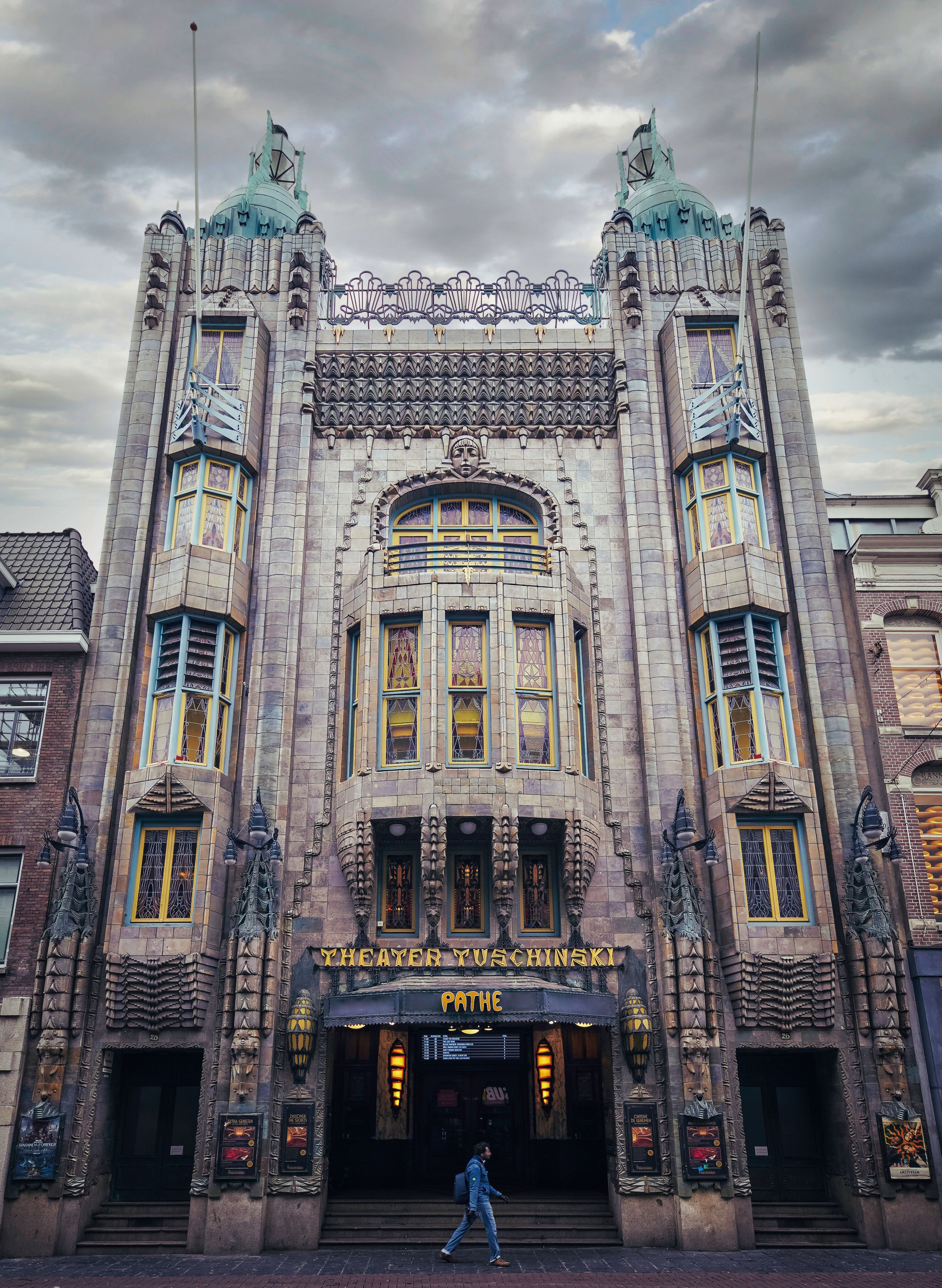
- Entrance in 2022
- Interactive map of Koninklijk Theater Tuschinski
- Address: Reguliersbreestraat; 26-34; Amsterdam, Netherlands
- Coordinates: 52.36619°N 4.894596°E
- Owner: Pathé via Les Cinémas Pathé Gaumont
- Capacity: 1,431
- Type: Movie theatre
- Public transit: GVB Metro: 52; GVB Tram: 4, 14, 24

Construction
- Groundbreaking: June 18, 1919; 107 years ago
- Opened: October 28, 1921; 104 years ago
- Renovated: 1998–2002; 2019–2020
- Expanded: 1983; Acquisition of Nöggerath Cinema
- Cost: c. ƒ 4,000,000
- Architects: Hijman Louis de Jong; Willem Kromhout

Website
- pathe.nl/tuschinski

The Koninklijk Theater Tuschinski (English: Royal Theatre Tuschinski) also called Pathé Tuchinski, is a movie theatre in Amsterdam, Netherlands, near Rembrandtplein and belonging to the historic French group Pathé.

== History ==
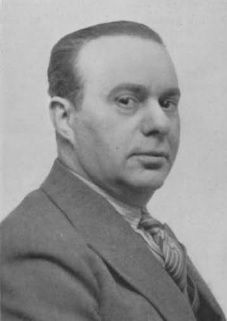
Abraham Tuschinski, founder

The theatre was founded by Abraham Icek Tuschinski, together with his brothers-in-law Hermann Gerschtanowitz and Hermann Ehrlich. Tuschinski already operated four theatres in Rotterdam and wanted to open a worldclass theatre in Amsterdam. Construction started on 18 June 1919, the theatre was built in Art Deco, Jugendstil and the Amsterdams School style at a cost of circa ƒ 4 million. Tuschinski wanted to open the theatre with the first theatre organ in the Netherlands; unfortunately Wurlitzer could not deliver in time; determined to open with an organ Tuschinski travelled to Brussels to acquire an existing one from another cinema. On October 28, 1921, the theatre opened its doors and the next day Dutch newspaper Het Vaderland wrote: "We declare before us generously that the wildest expectations have been exceeded and that Mr. Tuschinski has donated a theatre to our country which is unparalleled." The theatre contained electro-technical features, then considered revolutionary. Its unique heating and ventilation system kept the temperature even throughout the building.

During the bombing of Rotterdam on 14 May 1940 Tuschinski lost all four of his cinemas there; his four cinemas outside Rotterdam survived. Following the bombing the Nazis occupied the Netherlands and in May 1940 Tuschinski, Ehrlich and Gerschtanowitz were fired by the Nazis from their own company. Tuschinski was taken over by the German film company Tobis Film. As an act of resistance, on the birthday of Queen Wilhelmina a Dutch and British flag were flown from a window of the theatre. Tobis changed the name Tuschinski to the Tivoli on 1 November 1940. During the occupation in July 1941 a fire broke out in which murals of Pieter den Besten were lost. Tuschinski and Gerschtanowitz were deported to Auschwitz and Ehrlich to Sobibor; all three were murdered by the Nazis in 1942. After the Dutch liberation the name Tuschinski was restored, but only three members of the Tuschinski, Gerschtanowitz and Ehrlich families survived. Max Gerschtanowitz inherited Tuschinski. The site was declared a national monument in 1967 due to its distinctive architecture. In 1983 the Nöggerath Cinema, which was located on the same block, was acquired and renamed Tuschinski 3. The entire complex was sold in 1985 to Cannon and again in 1991 to MGM Cinemas.

The French-based Pathé acquired the MGM Cinemas chain in The Netherlands including Tuschinski in 1995. They renovated the cinema from 1998 to 2002 to its original style and a corridor was constructed to Tuschinski 3, giving the complex a total of 6 auditoriums. Leading up to the cinema's centennial in 2021 Pathé renovated the complex yet again. This time auditorium 2 was brought back to its former glory, including the lost murals of Pieter den Besten. The former Nöggerath auditoriums were also given an update and in their foyer Bar Abraham opened. During the centennial Time Out magazine named Tuschinski the most beautiful cinema in the world. On 28 October 2021 Femke Halsema, mayor of Amsterdam, announced that King William-Alexander granted the cinema the royal predicate, renaming the complex to Koninklijk Theater Tuschinski (Royal Theatre Tuschinski).

== Architecture ==
The western facade is flanked by two towers. It is decorated with ceramic sculptures and contains several leadlight windows. The facade blends several architectural styles: Art Deco, Art Nouveau, Jugendstil and the Amsterdam School.

The building contains Asian influences while the lobby was designed in a way to offer theatergoers the feeling that they are stepping into an illusion. The Tuschinski's main auditorium has served as both a movie theater and a live performance space since its opening. In addition to a film screen, it also contains a stage and an organ.

== Gallery ==
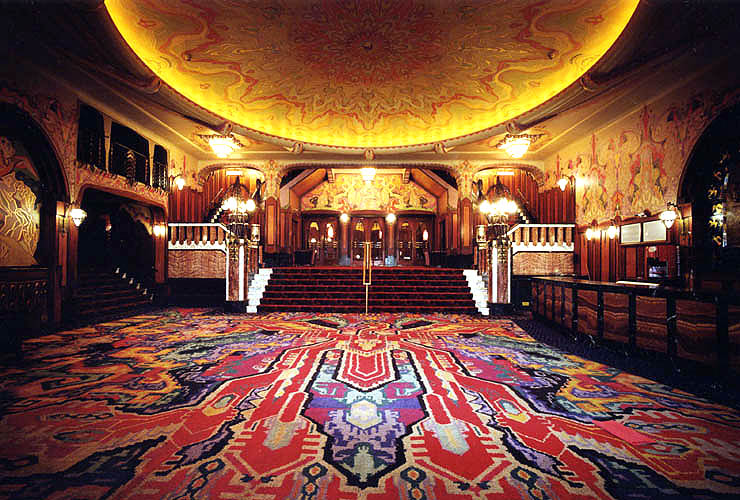
Foyer

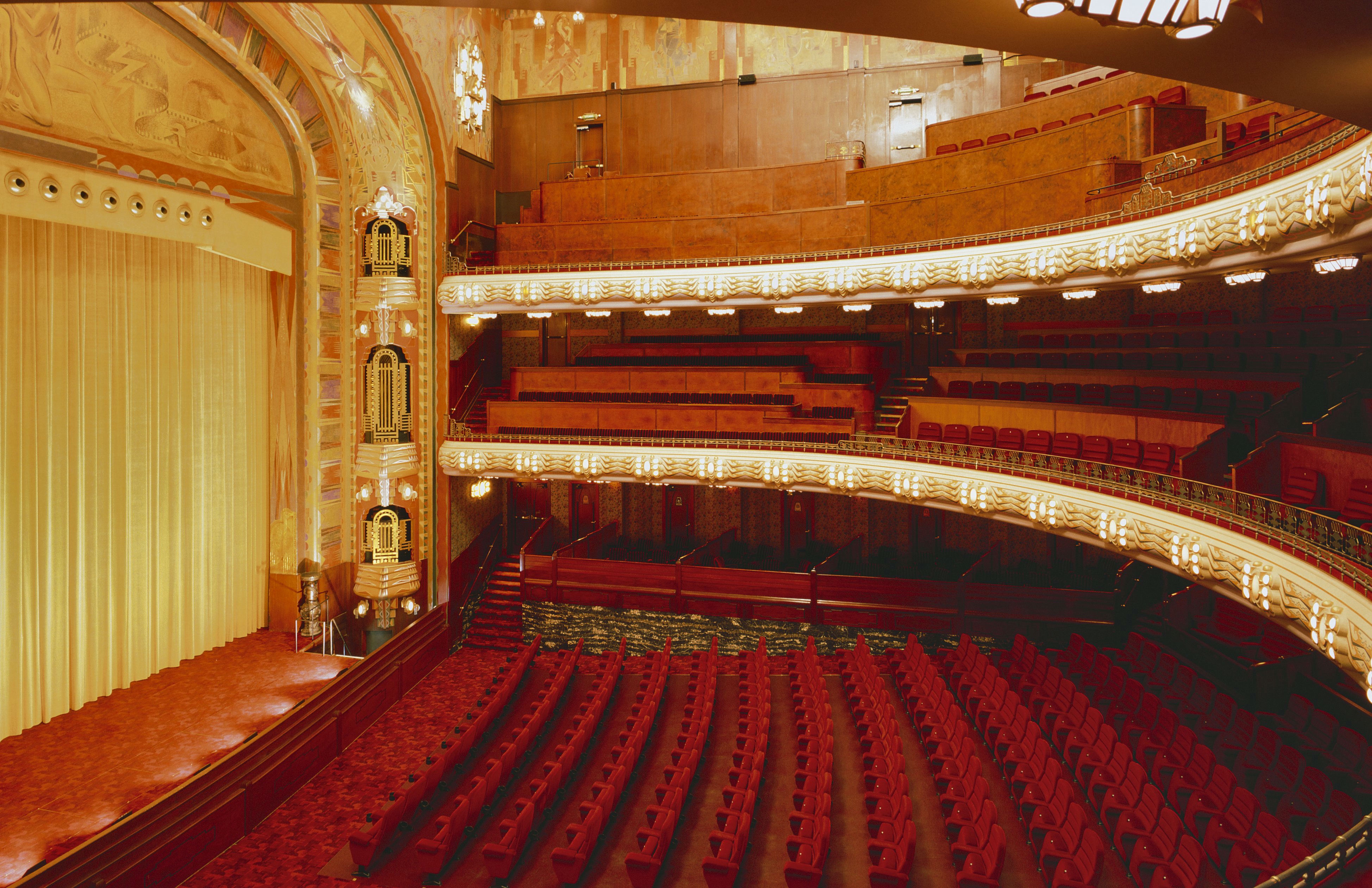
Auditorium

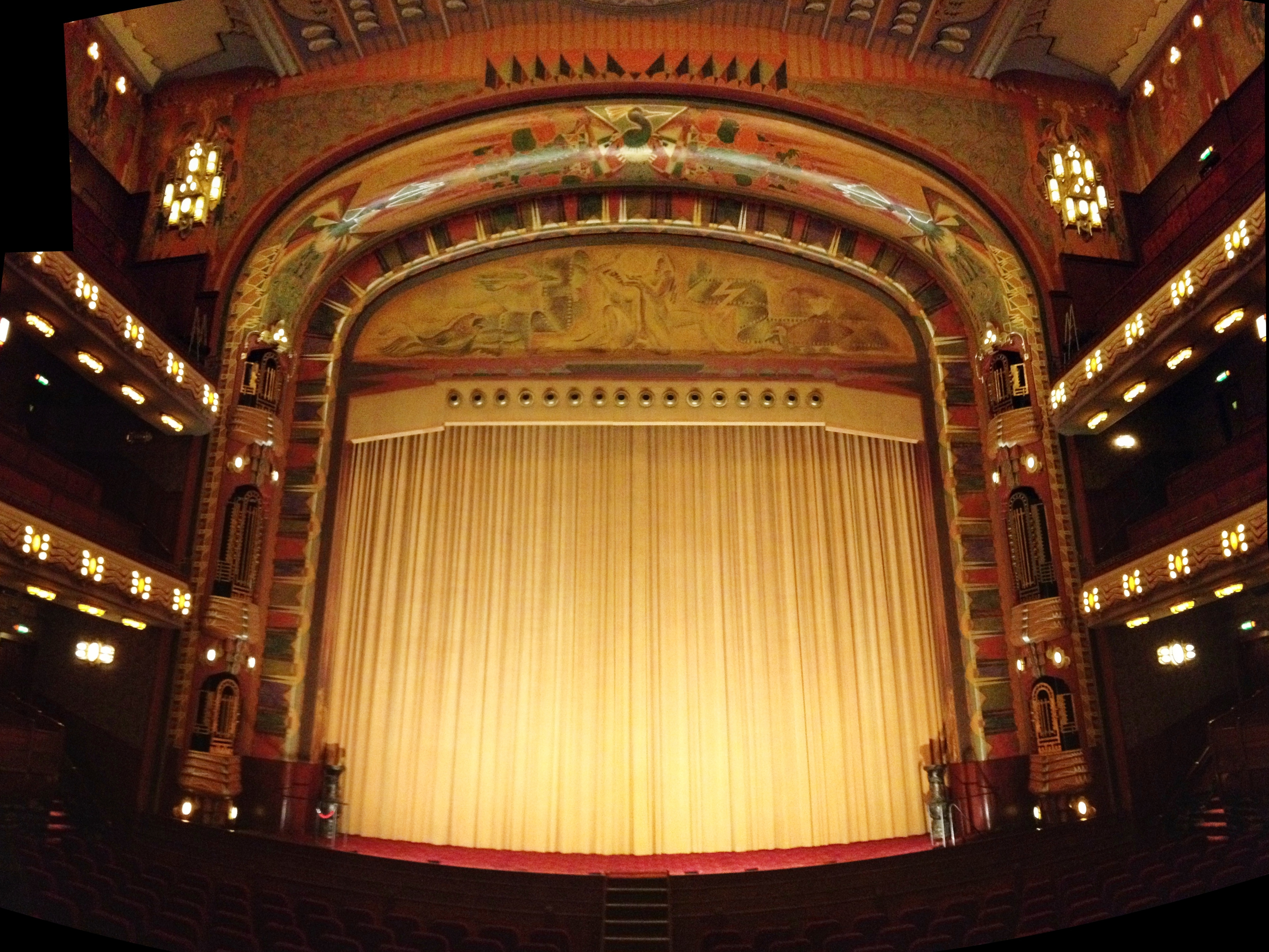
Auditorium

Entrance

Ceiling of the Auditorium.
