= International Quorum of Motion Picture Producers =

The International Quorum of Motion Picture Producers (IQ)
- Abbreviation: IQ
- Formation: 1966
- Type: Film organization
- Headquarters: Zurich, Switzerland
- President: Bestor Cram
- Website: www.iqfilm.org

The International Quorum of Motion Picture Producers (IQ) is a global peer network of production company owners. In November 1966, Graeme Fraser, then vice-president of Crawley Films, was named as IQ's first president. Membership includes more than 100 motion picture companies and individuals from countries world-wide. IQMPP, with a membership representing six continents and more than 45 countries is the only globally wide organization of its kind.

== Background ==
IQ was founded in 1966 by North Carolina filmmaker Walter Klein in order to create an international association of filmmakers to exchange information and knowledge and pool production resources. The "Standard Motion Picture Production Contract" was developed by IQ.

== Membership ==
By December 2010, IQ comprised more than 80 members in 45 countries spanning 6 continents. Some members of IQMPP include, among others, Canada's Minds Eye Pictures, New Zealand's Omnicron Productions, Switzerland's Condor Films Ltd and Tribe Pictures in New Jersey. Current president is Bestor Cram of Northern Light Productions Boston, Massachusetts, USA.

Membership in the IQ is by invitation with select membership criteria.

== Festival Activities ==
Each year at the US International Film and Video Festival, 'Best of Festival' (Grand Prix) awards are presented to an outstanding entry from among the Gold Camera winners in the main categories by members of IQMPP. In 2004, IQMPP Member Robert James was member of the film jury at the Cannes Lions International Festival.
