= The Recall =

2017 film by Mauro Borrelli

- Theatrical release poster
- Directed by: Mauro Borrelli
- Written by: Reggie Keyohara III; Sam Acton King
- Produced by: Kevin DeWalt; Danielle Masters; Wesley Snipes
- Starring: Wesley Snipes; R. J. Mitte; Jedidiah Goodacre
- Music by: Todd Bryanton
- Production companies: Minds Eye Entertainment; Bridgegate Pictures; VMI Worldwide
- Distributed by: Minds Eye International (Canada); Freestyle Digital Media (United States)
- Release date: June 2, 2017
- Running time: 90 minutes
- Countries: Canada; United States
- Language: English

The Recall is a 2017 science fiction horror film directed by Mauro Borrelli, and written by Reggie Keyohara and Sam Acton King. The film, starring Wesley Snipes, R. J. Mitte and Jedidiah Goodacre, was released on June 2, 2017, in the United States and Canada.

== Plot ==
During a time when strange atmospheric disturbances are occurring at various locales around the globe, a group of teenagers go on a vacation trip to a secluded cottage in the woods. At a filling station along the way they have a bad encounter with a man (Wesley Snipes) who calls himself "The Hunter". At the cottage, the teenagers begin exploring and come across a seemingly abandoned cabin. Inside, they find pictures and realize it's the Hunter's house, and furthermore, that he was formerly an astronaut. When he returns unexpectedly they sneak out and run away.

That night, when the Hunter shows up in the woods outside their cottage, they believe he is there to attack them. One of them, Rob (Niko Pepaj), goes to the car to get his gun, but on the way back he sees an alien under the porch and panics but he doesn't tell his friends. Later, during the atmospheric disturbances, they see a glow of light. Only Kara seems to know what it is, and seems terrified of it. When an alien enters the house, Rob panics and accidentally shoots Kara. He breaks down and turns on his friends. Charlie stops him by rendering him unconscious. The remaining friends run for the car and drive away in panic. When Rob suddenly appears in the road, Charlie swerves to avoid him and crashes the car. They watch from the wreckage as a UFO appears and abducts Rob, allowing the others to make their escape.

Unbeknownst to the teenagers, the Aliens have come to Earth, abducting thousands of humans. On the run from the aliens with the others, Brendan is injured by a bear trap placed by the Hunter. The Hunter appears and saves them from a pursuing alien, and takes them back to his cabin. The Hunter ambushes an alien in a pit and seems to take personal pleasure in killing it. The Hunter explains that he was abducted and experimented-on by the aliens years ago. He shows them scarifications left on his body by the aliens; furthermore, he demonstrates that he can move objects telekinetically. He explains that the aliens have visited Earth several times in the distant past, and through "enhancements" made to abductees, have controlled the evolution of life on Earth. Since his retirement as an astronaut he has been preparing for their return, dedicating himself to putting an end to their reign.

But the aliens besiege the cabin and the teenagers all end up being taken up to the spaceship, where they are among a few thousand humans who are abducted, experimented on, then returned to Earth. The teenagers all wake up back at their cottage, with no memory of having been abducted or experimented on. Kara, who had been killed, also appears to be alive and well. On the road, they are stopped by a military roadblock; although the alien ships have departed as mysteriously as they'd arrived, the government has responded to the mass abductions by putting a plan in place to quarantine anyone who shows the telltale scarifications from having been abducted. When the soldiers attack, with the help of the Hunter the teenagers using their alien-given "enhancements" slaughter the soldiers, instead. After the massacre, Kara heals and simultaneously saves Rob. Soon after, officers radio that they will soon arrive to incinerate the bodies. In the final scene, the young people look out over the landscape and a storm begins again, possibly signaling the return of the alien ships. At this point, the closing credits appear, and the film ends.

== Cast ==
- Wesley Snipes as "The Hunter"
- RJ Mitte as Brendan
- Jedidiah Goodacre as Charlie
- Niko Pepaj as Rob
- Laura Bilgeri as Annie
- Hannah Rose May as Kara
- Sean Millington as Colonel McAllen
- Graham Shiels as Prisoner Romanovich
- Viccellous Reon Shannon as Astronaut Jackson

== Production ==
The Recall is one of only a few films that used the widescreen Barco Escape format. A virtual reality trailer was made for the film.

== Reception ==
=== Critical response ===
The Recall received mainly negative reviews. On the review aggregator website Rotten Tomatoes, 0% of 6 critics' reviews are positive, with an average rating of 2.8/10.
