= Eddsworld =

British animated comedy web series

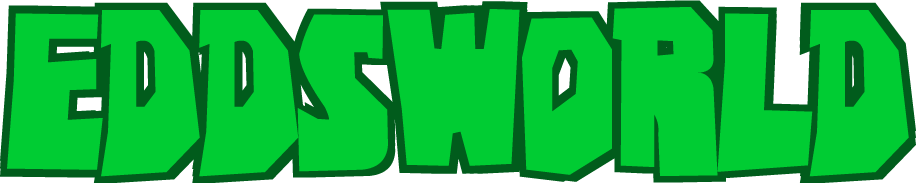
- Official title design
- Also known as: Eddsworld: Legacy (2012–2016); Eddsworld Beyond (2020–present)
- Genre: Black comedy; Surreal comedy; Adventure fiction
- Created by: Edd Gould
- Showrunners: Edd Gould (2004–2012); Thomas Ridgewell (2012–2016); Matt Hargreaves (2020–2026); Andy Clift (2026–present)
- Voices of: Edd Gould; Tim Hautekiet; George Gould; Thomas Ridgewell; Ed Templer; Matt Hargreaves; Tord Larsson; Jamie Spicer-Lewis
- Composers: Yoav Landau; Todd Bryanton; Ken Ashcorp; Christopher Bingham; Daniel Dobbs; Kevin MacLeod; Rowan Alfred; Olivia Clarke; Abbie Howard; Rob Field; Andy Clift
- Country of origin: United Kingdom
- Original language: English
- No. of episodes: 54 (list of episodes)

Production
- Executive producers: Desiree Karlsson; James Edward Marks; Andrew Stock; Chris Boldt; Chris Fitzgerald; Rob DenBleyker; Sue Gould; Matt Hargreaves; Darcy Wilde
- Producers: Thomas Ridgewell; Eddie Bowley; Christopher Bingham; Matt Hargreaves; Andy Clift
- Editors: Elliot Gough; Christopher Bingham; Andy Clift
- Running time: 3–12 minutes
- Production companies: CakeBomb; TurboPunch Ltd.; Eddsworld Animation Ltd.

Original release
- Network: Newgrounds; DeviantArt; YouTube; SheezyArt
- Release: 15 December 2004 – present

Eddsworld is a British Flash-animated web series created by Edd Gould. Since its premiere on 15 December 2004, the series has been published through Newgrounds, DeviantArt, YouTube, Albino Blacksheep, Tumblr, SheezyArt, BBC, and an official website.

== Synopsis ==
Eddsworld follows the misadventures of a group of four (Edd, Tom, Matt, Tord), later three (without Tord), young adults living together in a house. The series is generally episodic, and typically has little continuity between episodes. This results in many episodes featuring the characters dying, and then appearing in the next episode as if nothing happened. The series is heavy on slapstick humor and references to internet culture, as well as science fiction and horror elements.

== History ==
=== Conception and development ===
Gould made his first flash animation, 'Edd' and published it on Newgrounds on 6 June 2003, though Eddsworld's first true episode, 'Eddsworld Christmas Special' would be released a year later on 15 December 2004. Eddsworld was conceived of four main characters, Edd, Tom, Matt, and Tord, with Gould's friends and himself voicing their respective characters; though both Tord Larsson and his character left the show in the episode, '25 Ft. Under the Seat' in 2008. Eddsworld was noticed by the organisers of the 2009 United Nations Climate Change Conference who commissioned an episode about climate change, used in the opening ceremony of the conference. On 16 April 2011, Gould revealed that he was diagnosed with acute lymphoblastic leukemia, noting that this was his second time battling cancer, the first in 2006. During the production of 'Space Face: Part 1' Gould passed away on 25 March 2012.

=== Following Gould's death ===
At the time of Gould's death, his YouTube channel had the most subscribers in the comedian category for the United Kingdom and was the 4th most viewed comedian in the United Kingdom. Following Gould's death, Thomas Ridgewell (the then-voice actor of Tom) became the series' new showrunner, launching a crowdfunding campaign on Indiegogo to continue the show titled Eddsworld: Legacy. Throughout 2012 to 2016, Ridgewell would donate the profits from Eddsworld: Legacy's episodes to CLIC Sargent, a United Kingdom program dedicated to cancer support for the young, donating a total of £80,176 (equivalent to £110,025 in 2025). Preceding the release of Eddsworld: Legacy's final episode, 'The End (Part 2)', Ridgewell announced he was leaving the show and handing control of the series to Matthew Hargreaves (voice actor of Matt) and Gould's family.

On 1 January 2017, the show's website went back online with new Eddsworld comics written and illustrated by Matt Hargreaves. On 1 August 2020, a new short titled "Fan Service 2" was released to kick off a new era of the show called Eddsworld Beyond, with Hargreaves as showrunner. In September 2026, Hargreaves announced that he would step down as showrunner on Eddsworld, as Andy Clift would succeed Hargreaves as showrunner. As of November 2026, the Eddsworld YouTube channel has more than 4.6 million subscribers.

== Cast and characters ==
The main characters prior to "25ft Under the Seat". Clockwise from top: Edd, Tord, Matt, and Tom.

=== Overview ===
Character	Voice actor		
Character	Eddsworld (2004–2012)	Eddsworld: Legacy (2012–2016)	Eddsworld Beyond (2020–present)
Main characters
Edd	Edd Gould	Tim Hautekiet (Note: Archival recordings of Edd Gould are used in "Space Face (Part 1)" and "The End (Part 1).")	George Gould
Tom	Thomas Ridgewell	Thomas Ridgewell	Ed Templer
Matt	Matt Hargreaves	Matt Hargreaves	Matt Hargreaves
Tord	Tord Larsson (Note: Voice acted from partially of the episode "Zombeh Attack" until "25ft Under the Seat," with Alex L'Abbe voicing the character until "Zombeh Attack" and making a guest appearance in "WTFuture".)	Jamie Spicer-Lewis	Character is silent
Supporting characters
Eduardo	Chris O'Neill	Brock Baker	Brock Baker
Jon	Eddie Bowley	Eddie Bowley	
Mark	Benjamin Rudman	Benjamin Rudman	Benjamin Rudman
The Evil Director	Christopher Bingham	Character is silent	
Zanta Claws	Josh Tomar	Josh Tomar	Josh Tomar
Santa Claus	Josh Tomar	Josh Tomar	Josh Tomar
Ell		Vicky Gould	Vicky Gould
Tamara		Chloe Dungate	Rachel Kiki
Matilda		Alice Ann Stacey	Jennifer Bingham

=== Main ===
The protagonists of Eddsworld are exaggerated parodies of series creator Edd Gould and his friends.

- Edd (voiced by Edd Gould from 2004–2012, Tim Hautekiet from 2012–2016, George Gould since 2020) – An adventurous, somewhat naïve artist with a green hoodie who tells puns and likes Coca-Cola and bacon.
- Tom (voiced by Alex L'Abbé in 2004, Thomas Ridgewell from 2005–2016, Ed Templer since 2021) – A cynical, alcoholic bass guitarist with a blue hoodie and empty eye sockets.
- Matt (voiced by Matt Hargreaves) – A self-obsessed, dim-witted narcissist with a purple hoodie, green overcoat, and a distinct chiseled chin.
- Tord (voiced by Alex L'Abbé from 2004–2005, Tord Larsson from 2005–2008, Jamie Spicer-Lewis in 2016) – A trigger-happy, hentai-addicted Norwegian inventor/artist with a red hoodie. In September 2008, the character was written off at Larsson's request; Tord's final appearance is in "25ft Under the Seat". Since returning in the Legacy finale "The End" (March 2016), the character has appeared in sporadic bit-parts.

=== Recurring ===
- Eduardo (voiced by Chris O'Neill 2010–2011, Brock Baker 2014–present) – Edd's next-door Neighbour and rival.
- Jon (voiced by Eddie Bowley 2010–2016) – Eduardo's housemate and counterpart to Tom. He is dim-witted, and is frequently abused by Eduardo or experiences misfortune. He is killed in "The End (Part 2)" as an indirect casualty during the battle between the protagonists and Tord.
- Mark (voiced by Ben Rudman) – Eduardo's housemate and counterpart to Matt.
- The Evil Director (voiced by Christopher Bingham) – A villainous film director who first appeared in the episode "Spares" (May 2008), attempting to clone Edd and his friends to bolster the sales of his film. He is accompanied by his markedly more intelligent assistant, Larry.
- Zanta Claws (voiced by Josh Tomar) – A zombie Santa Claus intent on destroying Christmas. He attacks and murders anyone who he perceives as naughty, his frequent targets being Edd and company, and holds a grudge against his successor.
- Ell (voiced by Vicky Gould) – The gender-swapped version of Edd.
- Tamara (voiced by Chloe Dungate in 2015, Rachel Kiki 2020–present) – The gender-swapped version of Tom.
- Matilda (voiced by Alice Ann Stacey in 2015, Jennifer Bingham 2020–present) – The gender-swapped version of Matt.
