= Abraham Icek Tuschinski =

Dutch businessman

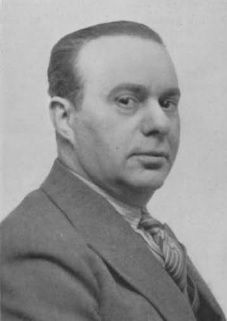
Abraham Tuschinski

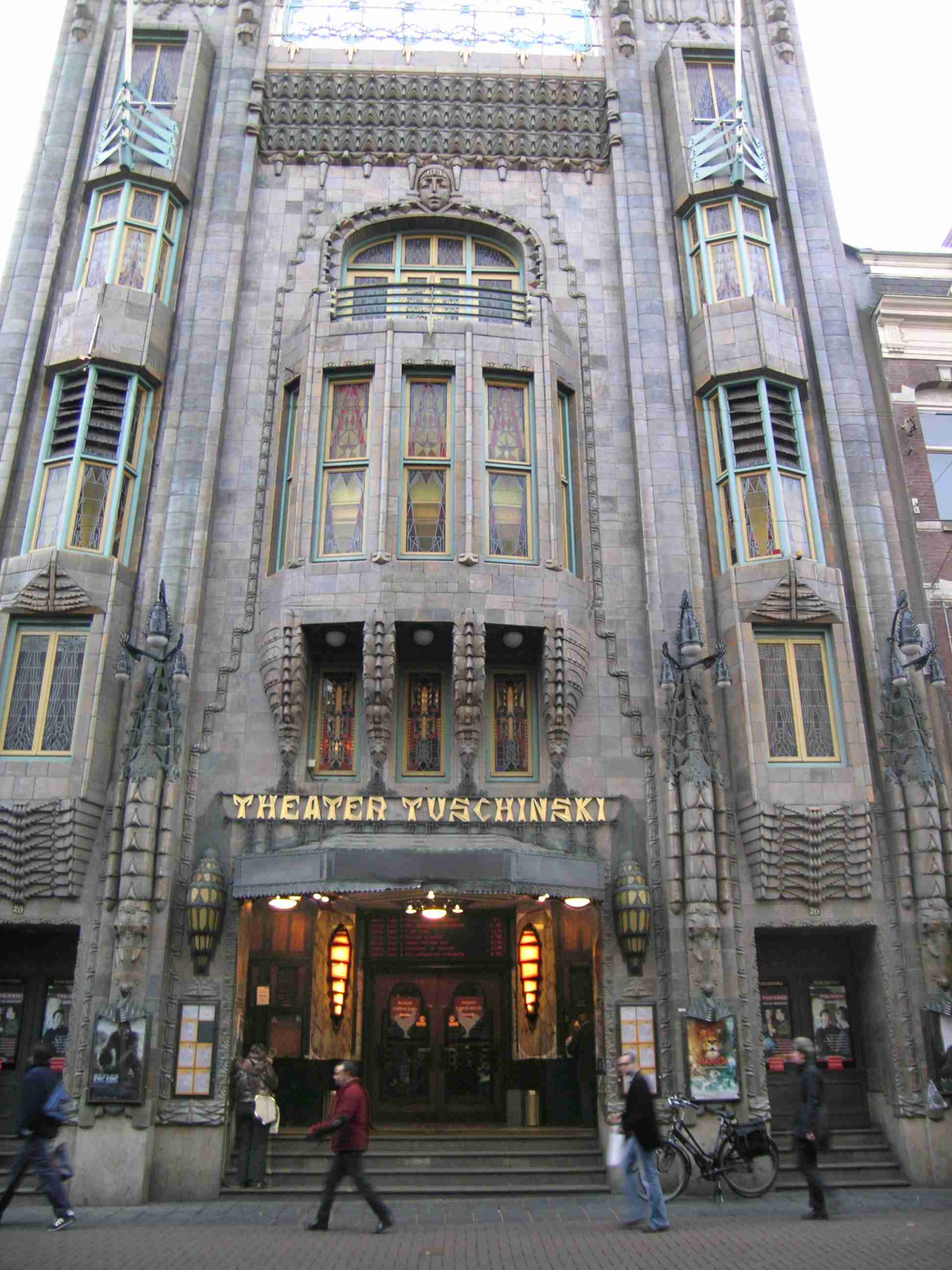
Tuschinski Theater in Amsterdam

Abraham Icek Tuschinski (Polish spelling: Tuszyński) (Brzeziny (near Łódź), 14 May 1886 – Auschwitz, 17 September 1942) was a Dutch businessman of Jewish Polish descent who ordered the construction of the Tuschinski Theater, a famed cinema in Amsterdam.

== Biography ==
While emigrating to the United States in 1903 Tuschinski decided to remain in Rotterdam during his stopover there. He found success as a cinema owner, opening his first four cinemas in 1911: the Thalia, Cinema Royal, Scala and Olympia. His most luxurious cinema in Rotterdam, the Grand Theater, opened in 1928.

His crowning achievement, the Tuschinski Theater, opened its doors in Amsterdam on 28 October 1921. The theater had an audience capacity of 1620, which made it the largest Dutch cinema at the time. The unique design of this building was a mix of three modern styles: Amsterdamse School, Art Deco and Jugendstil. The elaborate exterior and opulent, richly decorated interior were restored to their former glory in the period 1998–2002. Tuschinski also opened another famed Amsterdam cinema, the Roxy Theater, in 1928.

When World War II broke out, Tuschinski lost all his cinemas in Rotterdam when the city was bombed by the Germans on 14 May 1940 (see Rotterdam Blitz). On 1 July 1942 he was transported to the Westerbork concentration camp in the northeast of the Netherlands, and from there to Auschwitz, where he was murdered.
