= Mall of Switzerland =

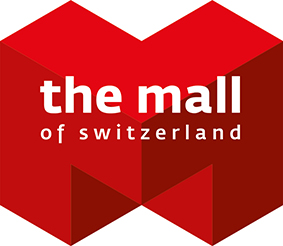
- Location: Ebikon, Switzerland
- Coordinates: 47.0938746°N 8.3582267°E
- Address: Ebisquare
- Opened: November 8, 2017
- Closed: None
- Owner: Abu Dhabi Investment Authority; Silver Holding SA
- Architect: Burkardt+Partner AG
- Num. of stores: 150
- Num. of anchor tenants: 1
- Floor area: 65,000 m^{2} (700,000 sq ft)
- Floors: 3
- Parking: 1600
- Public transit: Local bus and train
- Website: Official website

The Mall of Switzerland is the biggest shopping mall in Central Switzerland. It is located in Ebikon. The mall contains 150 shops, that are located on 3 floors.

The construction of the mall begun in 2013, and it was completed and opened on November 8, 2017. The mall spreads over 65,000 m^{2} (700,000 sq ft) and built at a cost of US$500 million,

The anchor tenant is Switzerland's largest retail company Migros.

== Concept ==
The mall concept combines shops and restaurants with leisure and sports facilities, a Playground, the first standing indoor wave of Switzerland and the country's second largest IMAX-cinema screen at Pathé, with 12 auditoriums and a total of 1962 seats. Furthermore, there is a Training Center Fitness- & Wellnessclub with over 2'000 square meters. Switzerland's largest children's playground in a shopping center has an area of 1,500 square metres.

One side of the mall contains a Pathé Multiplex movie theater with 12 screens. The mall also contains 17 restaurants.

== Location ==
The mall is located on Ebisquare Street next to the Schindler Group elevator factory premises in Ebikon.

== Architecture ==
The mall consists of the structures mall, leisure and multi-storey car park buildings. In terms of urban development, the buildings with innovative architecture fit into the large scale character of the surrounding industrial area, which stretches along the railway line in Rontal (Canton Lucerne). The so-called "Jumping Facades" are unique in Switzerland. This refers to the flexibility and variety in the planning and creation of the shop fronts. Among other things, the fronts of the individual shops instead of juxtaposing along a common line as usual can also jump forward or backward individually, reminding the mall of a naturally grown shopping street.

The Mall of Switzerland logo was derived from the Swiss cross and condensed into a pattern known from fashion brands. It takes up Swiss red.

== Scheduling ==
In 2005, the Ebikon Municipal Assembly approved the development plan Ebisquare, on which the current concept of the Mall of Switzerland is based. After the former investor had to quit due to a financing bottleneck, Halter took over the project in 2011 with the idea to divide it into the different parts shopping, leisure, living and hotel. Halter consulted the project developers FREO, with whose help the current investor could be found. The foundation stone was laid on 11 June 2014, and the shell was completed after one and a half years, on December 23, 2015. The mall opened on November 8, 2017.

== Investors ==
The project was financed by a subsidiary of Silver Holdings SA. This is a real estate investment company wholly owned by the Abu Dhabi Investment Authority (ADIA). At the Mall of Switzerland FREO Switzerland was active as project developer, which also represents the investor. FREO Switzerland AG is a private equity company and fund manager specialising in the acquisition and development of commercial real estate.

== Varia ==
The planned opening on September 28, 2017, was postponed to the beginning of November 2017 due to a construction stop in March 2017.

The mall publishes a list of all shops and restaurants in one post in 20-minutes newspaper. Until the beginning of October 2017 about 80% of the space was rented.

One of the planned attractions of the leisure offer, the "indoor surf wave", did not open as planned in March 2018, but was finally opened on September 13, 2018, and currently attracts a lot of mall goers.
