= The Humanity Bureau =

- Theatrical release poster
- Directed by: Rob W. King
- Written by: Dave Schultz
- Produced by: Kevin DeWalt; Kelly-Rae Buchan; Danielle Masters
- Starring: Nicolas Cage; Sarah Lind; Hugh Dillon; Jakob Davies
- Cinematography: Mark Dobrescu
- Edited by: Jackie Dzuba
- Music by: Todd Bryanton
- Production companies: Minds Eye Entertainment; Bridgegate Pictures; VMI Worldwide
- Distributed by: Minds Eye International; Quiver Distribution (United States)
- Release date: April 6, 2018
- Running time: 94 minutes
- Country: Canada
- Language: English
- Box office: $58,970

The Humanity Bureau is a 2018 Canadian science fiction thriller film directed by Rob W. King and written by Dave Schultz. The film stars Nicolas Cage, Sarah Lind, Hugh Dillon and Jakob Davies. The film was released on April 6, 2018, by Minds Eye Entertainment.

== Plot ==
In the future, war, climate and political agendas have robbed America of its resources. An agency called "the Humanity Bureau" ensures citizens are efficient. Inefficient citizens are deported to a city called New Eden. Noah Kross is an agent of the Humanity Bureau who manages the deportation of Chester Hills, a former governor of Colorado, who now lives in misery. When asked why he wishes to stay in squalor rather than be relocated to New Eden, he says he knows "the truth". He fires a shotgun at Kross and the hotel manager; Kross kills him in self-defense.

Kross evaluates a single mother, Rachel Weller, and her son, Lucas. Though apparently struggling, they wish to stay rather than go to New Eden. With the help of his friend Agent Porter, he delays sending in his report so the boy can perform at a musical recital the following day; Kross fondly remembers fishing in Canada as a boy and wants Lucas to have a positive memory of his recital. This act of minor insubordination upsets the Bureau and catches the attention of Kross’s supervisor Adam, who places him under investigation. Rachel's resistance to relocation and the "truth" purported by Chester motivate Kross to investigate New Eden. A defense contractor working for the bureau gives Kross a memory card.

The next day, Kross attends Lucas' recital and spends the night with them. When he wakes up the next morning, he sees the Bureau coming and rushes inside to get Rachel and Lucas. Rachel is being held hostage by Adam. Lucas shoots Adam in the eye with a BB gun and they escape. They drive to a gas station; Kross isn't able to purchase gas because his card has been canceled. Kross demands gas at gunpoint. When asked by the owner if Kross is a family man, he says he is "trying to be". The owner assists in their flight by crashing his truck into the Bureau vehicles pursuing Kross.

Back at the Bureau, Adam is admonished for failing to stop Kross. The Bureau's director opens a package of what looks like dust in front of him and shows Adam a child's tooth, warning him that if he fails again, he will end up in New Eden, revealed to be an extermination camp where unproductive citizens are incinerated. Kross has learned the truth and seeks to save Lucas and Rachel.

During their flight, Kross trades his Bureau vehicle for an unmarked station wagon and learns of a man who may know a way north. When they find the man, they learn that the way north to Canada is highly irradiated and that no one who ever goes returns. When he insists, the man gives Kross a geiger counter to measure radiation, and iodine tablets which provide some protection against radiation absorption. Kross gives Lucas a rabbit's foot for good luck during the trip.

Along the road, they spot a drone searching for Kross. After becoming tired and frustrated waiting for it to pass, Kross and Rachel get into an argument where Kross reveals that he knows the real Rachel Weller, and this woman is not her. Years ago on a Bureau investigation, Kross and the real Rachel conceived a child, who is Lucas. When the famine struck, Rachel tried to sell Lucas. Amanda, her neighbor, got into an argument over this and the resulting fight ended in Rachel's death. Amanda then assumed Rachel's identity and raised Lucas as her own.

The three continue to evade the Bureau and eventually make it to a nuclear power plant, which the man warned them was highly irradiated. Their geiger counter reveals that there is not any radiation; it was a scare tactic to try to keep people from fleeing north. Finally at the border the Bureau catches up with Kross, and Adam shoots and kills Rachel, demanding the memory card. Kross agrees to give Adam the card so long as Lucas can go. Lucas runs away and Kross gives Adam the card, which Adam scans only to find out it is empty. Adam executes Kross and Lucas comes running back. At this moment, Canadian rangers shoot the Bureau members and take in Lucas, leaving only Agent Porter to escape. They find that the real memory card was in the rabbit's foot and disseminate the footage revealing New Eden as a death camp, sparking a revolution against the Bureau, plunging the whole country into civil war. The whole personnel and the director of the Humanity Bureau can only watch helplessly as they lose control over the population and have to fight for their lives from then on. Porter is ambushed by an armed rebel on the road and shot dead. Lucas finally gets to visit the lake Kross used to fish in.

== Cast ==
- Nicolas Cage as Noah Kross
- Sarah Lind as Rachel Weller
- Hugh Dillon as Adam Westinghouse
- Jakob Davies as Lucas Weller
- Vicellous Shannon as Agent Porter
- Mel Tuck as Chester Hills
- Kurt Max Runte as Adolf Schroder
- Lorne Cardinal as Border Ranger
- Destee Klyne as Schroder's Daughter
- Nikolas Filipovic as Spiky Hair
- Jett Klyne as Little Noah
- David Lovgren as Irving Ravetch

== Production ==
In November 2016, it was reported Nicolas Cage had agreed to star in The Humanity Bureau, a science fiction action film set to be directed by Rob King from a script by Dave Schultz. Filming began the following month in British Columbia. Producer Kevin DeWalt stated the film was shot in three different formats consisting of standard theatrical format, Barco Escape, and cinematic virtual reality with the intention of offering alternative avenues for audience engagement.

== Release ==
An episodic virtual reality series titled The Humanity Bureau VRevolution was set for release on March 2, 2018 which would take the viewer through additional story lines that exist within the film's world. The series was directed by Rob W. King and Josh Courtney and written by Dave Schultz and Travis Cloyd.

The Humanity Bureau was released theatrically in both standard and Barco Escape formats and Premium Video On Demand as day-and-date release on April 6, 2018.

== Reception ==
=== Critical response ===
On review aggregator website Rotten Tomatoes, the film holds an approval rating of 25% based on eight reviews.
