= Distorted (film) =

- Directed by: Rob W. King
- Screenplay by: Arne Olsen
- Produced by: Kevin DeWalt; Danielle Masters; Benjamin DeWalt; Andrew Holmes
- Starring: John Cusack; Christina Ricci
- Cinematography: Mark Dobrescu
- Edited by: Jackie Dzuba
- Production companies: Bridgegate Pictures; Minds Eye Entertainment; QME Entertainment
- Distributed by: Minds Eye International; Quiver Distribution
- Release date: June 22, 2018 (United States)
- Running time: 86 minutes
- Country: Canada
- Language: English
- Box office: $29,103

Distorted is a 2018 Canadian thriller film starring Christina Ricci and John Cusack.

== Plot ==
Russel Curran (Brendan Fletcher) is a successful businessman living in Portland, Oregon. His 32-year-old wife Lauren (Christina Ricci) has bipolar disorder after a home invasion left her injured and her baby drowned in the bathtub.

Craving a safe home, Russel and Lauren decide to move into a luxurious high-tech smart apartment an hour away from Portland. On one of their first evenings, they attend a cocktail party and meet the other residents who are all very wealthy. One of them is Phillip Starks (Vicellous Reon Shannon), an heir of a successful marketing company focussing on consumer psychology.

Lauren notices strange noises coming from the apartment's sound system and occasionally sees the TV flashing up strange pictures and words. She tries to speak to Russel, but he blames her bipolar disorder and accuses her of paranoia. Later, Russel secretly installs CCTV cameras to observe Lauren's behavior.

Through research on the internet, Lauren gets in touch with Vernon Sarsfield (John Cusack), a hacker and journalist. Vernon affirms to Lauren that she is not paranoid and that she needs to help him to prove that the residents of her home are being used as involuntary experimental subjects for subliminal stimuli by the building's owners. Vernon believes Lauren is the only one to notice the subliminal messaging because of her bipolar disorder.

One day, Lauren meets a resident that she perceives as particularly awkward. He tells Lauren that he "is not one of them" and soon after commits suicide by jumping off the roof of the building. As the strange events intensify, Vernon advises Lauren to leave since he has been tracked and thus can not help her anymore.

Lauren becomes increasingly suspicious of Russel who threatens to send her to a psychiatric hospital. As Lauren figures that all residents have continuously been scratching their necks, thus must have been exposed to some substance or implant, she tries to flee, but the building's security manager and groundskeeper apprehend her in the garage and forcefully subdue her with an injection in the neck.

As Lauren wakes up, she is restrained and exposed to another subliminal stimuli on the TV, realizing that the goal of the stimuli is for her to murder a three-year-old child residing in another apartment. Vernon suddenly appears and frees Lauren. He gives her a gun and allows her to flee by holding up the pursuers, but is murdered.

Lauren does as the stimuli suggested by kidnapping the child. Russel tries to win back her trust by saying he has proof of the subliminal stimuli through the CCTV he has installed, but Lauren rebuffs him. Using the images implanted into her head earlier, she drives the child to an abandoned shack. Later, she is then seen driving to an abandoned luxurious hotel with a blood-stained bag where she is greeted by Phillip Stark, and the building's employees and some of its residents who were disguised employees of Stark. Stark interviews Lauren on how she feels about having killed the child. As Lauren replies that she feels well since she does as expected from her, Stark is satisfied and thanks Lauren for her contribution to the future of warfare.

However, as Stark opens the bag, it is only filled with apples. A flashback reveals that Lauren and Russel had only faked the child's death. Stark attacks Lauren, but Russel rushes to her aid and shoots him dead. The police arrive and surround the premises.

In the closing scene, a pregnant Lauren and Russel have moved into a new home. As they hug, Lauren suspiciously eyes the parent unit Russel had been trying to install.

== Cast ==
- Christina Ricci as Lauren Curran
- John Cusack as Vernon Sarsfield
- Brendan Fletcher as Russel Curran
- Vicellous Reon Shannon as Phillip Starks
- Nicole Anthony as Margo Ingram
- Oliver Rice as Lance Geyer

== Production ==
Production for the film started in Kelowna and Vernon, British Columbia in May 2017. The film is produced by Kevin DeWalt, CEO of Minds Eye Entertainment.

== Release ==
Minds Eye Entertainment co-produced and released the film in North America territories, while Voltage Pictures handled international rights for the film.

== Reception ==
On review aggregator website Rotten Tomatoes, the film holds an approval rating of 18% based on 11 reviews with an average rating of 4.2/10.
