= Minds Eye Entertainment =

Canadian film studio and entertainment company

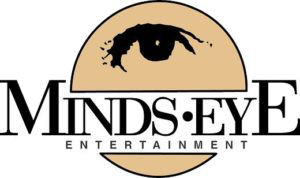
- Formerly: Minds Eye Pictures
- Type: Division
- Industry: Film
- Founded: 1986
- Headquarters: Regina, Saskatchewan, Canada
- Area served: Worldwide
- Key people: Kevin DeWalt (Founder, CEO, Producer); Ben DeWalt (Producer, Partner); Danielle Masters (Producer)
- Products: Motion pictures, television
- Parent: Minds Eye Corporation
- Website: Official website

Minds Eye Entertainment is a Canadian film and television production and distribution company headquartered in Regina, Saskatchewan, Canada. The company produces television and film projects in Canada and the United States as well as internationally. Minds Eye Entertainment was founded by Kevin DeWalt and Ken Krawczyk in 1986. The company has produced more than sixty films and television series and has received over fifty national and international film awards.

== History ==
Minds Eye Entertainment was formed in 1986 by Kevin DeWalt and Ken Krawczyk. In 1989, the company produced their first drama project, The Great Electrical Revolution, a short film written by Ken Mitchell. The film was produced in collaboration with National Film Board of Canada. In 1997, Minds Eye Entertainment and Condor Films jointly produced Richard Chamberlain starrer The Lost Daughter. The same year, the company produced season 1 of Incredible Story Studios, a 65-episode dramatic television series, which aired for 5 seasons from 1997 to 2002 on YTV. The following year, the company produced a drama science fiction fantasy series, Mentors, for Family Channel that included 52 episodes. The series was aired for 4 seasons with Discovery Kids airing in the United States and Latin America whereas NHK aired Japanese dubbed version of the series in Japan.

In the year 1995, Minds Eye Entertainment produced Decoy featuring Peter Weller and Robert Patrick. In 1999, Minds Eye Entertainment collaborated with Trimark Pictures and Original Film and produced Held Up, featuring Jamie Foxx and Nia Long. In 2001, The Unsaid featuring Andy Garcia was released. In 2003, the company produced and released One Last Dance starring Patrick Swayze followed by Falling Angels featuring Callum Keith Rennie. Falling Angels received six nominations at the 2004 Genie Awards winning two awards

Between 2001 and 2006, Minds Eye Entertainment produced and released multiple television series including MythQuest, Just Cause, 2030 CE and Prairie Giant: The Tommy Douglas Story. In 2004, the company produced Intern Academy, a comedy film written and directed by Dave Thomas followed by Seven Times Lucky, a crime drama directed by Gary Yates.

The Englishman's Boy, a made-for-television limited series, was produced by Minds Eye Entertainment for CBC Television in the year 2008. The film was based on the Governor General's Award winning novel by Guy Vanderhaeghe. The Englishman's Boy received six Gemini Awards that year including Best TV movie or Mini Series. In 2009, the company produced four feature films including Walled In with Mischa Barton, Grace, The Shortcut and Dolan's Cadillac with Wes Bentley and Christian Slater.

Between 2010 and 2013, Minds Eye Entertainment produced six films including Faces in the Crowd featuring Milla Jovovich and The Tall Man featuring Jessica Biel. In 2015, Minds Eye Entertainment produced and released Kiefer Sutherland and Donald Sutherland starrer revisionist western film, Forsaken. The film was nominated for five awards at the 4th Canadian Screen Awards. In 2017, the company produced and released The Recall featuring Wesley Snipes and The Humanity Bureau featuring Nicolas Cage.

Christina Ricci and John Cusack starred in Minds Eye Entertainment's Distorted in 2018. In 2019, the company produced and released two films, Daughter of the Wolf featuring Gina Carano and Richard Dreyfuss was released in June whereas A Score to Settle featuring Nicolas Cage was released in the month of August. In 2020, Minds Eye Entertainment produced a fantasy romantic drama film, Endless, featuring Alexandra Shipp, Nicholas Hamilton and Famke Janssen. Later that year, Minds Eye Entertainment co-produced a Mexican-Spanish film, The Day of the Lord, which was distributed and released by Netflix in October.

In 2021, Minds Eye Entertainment co-produced Dangerous starring Scott Eastwood, Kevin Durand, Tyrese Gibson, Famke Janssen and Mel Gibson. The film was released by Lionsgate in the month of November. Minds Eye Entertainment recently announced development on Black Cyclone to be directed by Canadian director icon Clement Virgo.

In its existence of over three decades, Minds Eye Entertainment has produced over 60 television series and theatrically released films. The company is seen as instrumental in building the Canadian film and television industry, with projects sold in over 200 countries around the world.

== Filmography ==
=== Film ===
Release date	Film title	Leading role(s)
1992	Eli's Lesson	Jack Palance and Kenneth Welsh
1995	Decoy	Peter Weller and Robert Patrick
1997	The Lost Daughter	Richard Chamberlain
1999	Held Up	Jamie Foxx and Nia Long
2001	The Unsaid	Andy Garcia
2003	One Last Dance	Patrick Swayze and Lisa Niemi
2003	Falling Angels	Callum Keith Rennie
2004	Intern Academy	Dave Thomas, Dan Aykroyd and Dave Foley
2009	Walled In	Mischa Barton
2009	Grace	Jordan Ladd
2009	The Shortcut	Andrew Seeley, Shannon Woodward and Katrina Bowden
2009	Dolan's Cadillac	Christian Slater, Emmanuelle Vaugier and Wes Bentley
2010	Ticket Out	Ray Liotta
2010	Lullaby for Pi	Rupert Friend, Clémence Poésy and Forest Whitaker
2011	Faces in the Crowd	Milla Jovovich, Julian McMahon, Michael Shanks and Sarah Wayne Callies
2012	The Tall Man	Jessica Biel, Jodelle Ferland and Stephen McHattie
2013	13 Eerie	Katharine Isabelle, Brendan Fehr and Michael Shanks
2013	Stranded	Christian Slater, Brendan Fehr, Amy Matysio and Michael Therriault
2015	Forsaken	Kiefer Sutherland and Donald Sutherland
2017	The Recall	Wesley Snipes
2017	The Humanity Bureau	Nicolas Cage
2018	Distorted	Christina Ricci and John Cusack
2019	Daughter of the Wolf	Gina Carano and Richard Dreyfuss
2019	A Score to Settle	Nicolas Cage and Benjamin Bratt
2020	Endless	Alexandra Shipp, Famke Janssen and Nicholas Hamilton
2020	The Day of the Lord	Dolores Heredia and Ximena Romo
2021	Dangerous	Scott Eastwood, Kevin Durand, Tyrese Gibson, Famke Janssen and Mel Gibson
2024	Die Alone	Carrie-Anne Moss, Douglas Smith, Frank Grillo
2026	November 1963	John Travolta, Mandy Patinkin, Dermot Mulroney, Robert Carlyle, Jefferson White

=== Television series ===
Release date	Film title	Note(s)
1997–2002	Incredible Story Studios	65 episodes; produced for YTV
1998–2002	Mentors	52 episodes; produced for Family Channel
1999–2004	Prairie Berry Pie	26 episodes; produced for the Global Television Network; Children's series
2001	MythQuest	13 episodes; produced for PBS
2002	Just Cause	22 episodes; produced for PAX Network
2002–2003	2030 CE	26 episodes; produced for YTV
2006	Prairie Giant: The Tommy Douglas Story	4-hour dramatic limited series for CBC Television
2008	The Englishman's Boy	Dramatic limited series for CBC Television
2010	Hollywood: Saskatchewan	26-part documentary series for SCN
2012	Around the Next Bend	Twelve-part travel documentation and adventure series for High Fidelity HDTV
