= Alamo: The Price of Freedom =

1988 film by Kieth Merrill

- Film poster
- Directed by: Kieth Merrill
- Written by: Kieth Merrill; George McAlister
- Based on: Alamo: The Price of Freedom by George McAlister
- Produced by: Ray Herbeck Jr.
- Starring: Merrill Connally; Casey Biggs; Enrique Sandino; Steve Sandor; Don Swayze; Derek Caballero; Martin Cuellar
- Cinematography: Reed Smoot
- Edited by: Ben Burtt
- Music by: Merrill B. Jenson
- Production company: Bonneville Entertainment
- Distributed by: Macgillivray Freeman Films
- Release date: March 5, 1988
- Running time: 45 minutes
- Country: United States
- Language: English
- Budget: $2.8 million

Alamo: The Price of Freedom is a 1988 American IMAX historical docudrama about the 1836 siege and Battle of the Alamo directed by Kieth Merrill and co-written by Merrill and George McAlister. The film stars Merrill Connally, Casey Biggs, Enrique Sandino, Steve Sandor, Don Swayze, and Derek Caballero.

McAlister, an admirer of William B. Travis, wrote the book Alamo: The Price of Freedom. Texas Cavalcade Corporation, which McAlister was president of, constructed the first IMAX theater in Texas and produced a film adaption of McAlister's book to be shown there. Merrill, who made other IMAX films, was selected to direct and shot the film at the Alamo Village from July to August 1987.

Prominent Hispanics in San Antonio were critical of the film, including its depiction of James Bowie's death and the lack of lines for Juan Seguín. The film's runtime was decreased from 73 minutes to 45 minutes in response to these comments and the need to show it every hour. It premiered on March 5, 1988, and has been shown continuously at the Rivercenter IMAX as of 2023.

== Premise ==
187 Texan rebels under the leadership of Davy Crockett, William B. Travis, and James Bowie fortify the Alamo Mission in preparation for an attack by Antonio López de Santa Anna and the Mexican Army.

== Cast ==
- Merrill Connally as Davy Crockett
- Casey Biggs as William B. Travis
- Enrique Sandino as Antonio López de Santa Anna
- Steve Sandor as James Bowie
- Don Swayze as James Bonham
- Derek Caballero as Juan Seguín
- Martin Cuellar as Toribio Losoya

== Production ==
=== Preproduction ===
$8 million was raised to make the film, with major investments from Pace Foods and Luby's. Texas Cavalcade Corporation, whose IMAX theater in San Antonio was scheduled to open in February 1988, planned for the Alamo: The Price of Freedom to premiere on the 152nd anniversary of the battle. Doug Beach, a spokesman for the company, estimated the cost of the theater at $3.7 million and the film at $2.8 million. Most of the IMAX films made at that time were scientific or educational, but Alamo: The Price of Freedom would be the first dramatic film shot in the format according to Kieth Merrill.

Merrill, who previously made the IMAX films Grand Canyon: The Hidden Secrets and Niagara: Miracles, Myths and Magic, was hired to direct. Merrill and George McAlister, president of Texas Cavalcade, co-wrote the film. McAlister wrote a novel based on William B. Travis, who was his personal hero, and later wrote Alamo: The Price of Freedom. The events of the film are depicted through the eyes of Travis. Bernice Strong, the archivist for the Daughters of the Republic of Texas' library at the Alamo was hired to review the historical accuracy of the 12 shooting scripts.

James T. Shahan oversaw the refurbishing of the Alamo Village, where the 1960 film was shot. Art director Roger Ragland previously worked on Miami Vice and Ben Burtt was both the film and sound editor. Kevin Young was the technical adviser for the film and manager of the IMAX theater it would be shown in.

=== Casting ===
Merrill Connally, the brother of Governor John Connally, was cast to play Davy Crockett, and Merrill's son Lee played Almaron Dickinson. Merrill said that casting 66 year old Connally as 50 year old Crockett "was a stretch", but that "we felt he represented the Crockett of legend - a grand Texan". Colombian actor Enrique Sandino was selected to play Antonio López de Santa Anna.

The 400 reenactors used for the film previously worked on Houston: The Legend of Texas, which was also filmed at the Alamo Village in 1986, and North and South. Ray Herveck Jr. was an associate producer and the choreographer. The reenactors were paid $50 per day. Non-Mexicans were selected to play Mexican soldiers and given dark paint on their face. Uniforms of Antiquity, which made costumes for North and South and Gone to Texas, created 200 costumes for the film.

=== Filming and protest ===
Shot using 70 mm film, filming started outside of Brackettville, Texas, on July 13, 1987, and ended in August. Reed Smoot was the cinematographer. 48,000 watts of light were used to appear like the moon.

A sound blimp was used to muffle the loud IMAX camera. Boom mics could not be used due to the height of the IMAX film so Burtt hid the microphones under clothing. Burtt had six people in his sound crew. The title song, Price of Freedom, was composed by McAlister's sons Mike and Clint and performed by Sergio Salinas. The score was composed by Merrill Jenson and played by the London Symphony Orchestra.

Texas Cavalcade Corporation showed a 73 minute rough cut of the film to 40 Hispanic leaders on December 21, 1987. Walter Martinez, a city councilor in San Antonio, criticized it as "having no redeeming social value" and "lacking in artistic quality". McAlister defended the film's historical accuracy as it was "the first Alamo movie to even show there were Tejano defenders". A press conference representing 30 organizations was held on December 30, and featured Martinez, Virgilio Elizondo, and María Antonietta Berriozábal criticizing the film.

Martinez was critical of the depiction of James Bowie's death, which showed him bayoneted by eight Mexican soldiers that lifted him up using the bayonets to parade him around. Producer Doug Beach defended the depiction of Bowie's death claiming that at least one account supported its accuracy. He was also critical of Juan Seguín only being "given half a sentence in the whole film". The film's run time was edited down from 73 minutes to 45 minutes, with the need to show it hourly being one of the reasons. A love scene between an Alamo defender and Mexican woman in a belfry, which was criticized by Martinez, was removed and McAlister stated that Martinez's criticism of the scene was justified. Characters, like Jonathan Lindley, were entirely removed by the editing while many scenes of José Gregorio Esparza and his brother Francisco, played by Eddie and Alex Solis, were cut.

== Release ==
A private premiere event was held at the Rivercenter IMAX on March 5, 1988, and raised $25,000 for the Daughters of the Republic of Texas' library. It was the first IMAX theater in Texas and the film was intended to only be shown there, but was also shown at the Fort Worth Museum of Science and History and in Spokane, Washington. Martinez and other Hispanics picketed the public opening on March 6, and called for a boycott of Pace Foods and Luby's. One of the protestors parodied Travis' line in the sand and stated that "All of you who will join in our boycott of Luby's and Pace, cross this line".

Alamo: The Price of Freedom is still being shown at the Rivercenter IMAX theater as of 2023; one of the longest theatrical runs for a film, but behind films like To Fly!. By 1998, over 3 million people watched the film. AMC Theatres acquired the rights to the film in 2013, and took over the IMAX theater. Over 400,000 people saw the film between 2013 and 2023.

As of 2023, Burtt is working on an extended cut that will be donated to the Harold B. Lee Library of Brigham Young University.

== Reception ==
Patrick Taggart, writing for the Austin American-Statesman, stated that it was "not an actor's movie" and that the IMAX camera was the true star. Bob Lapham, writing for Abilene Reporter-News, praised the film as awesome. Michael Price, writing for the Fort Worth Star-Telegram, gave the film a 6 out of 10 stating that "plain history is good enough and imaginative license is minimal". Albert Nofi considers it the most historically accurate film about the battle of the Alamo. Chris Tomlinson criticized the film's historical accuracy, the lack of a named Tejano with a speaking role, and that Santa Anna "is depicted as a mustache-twirling villain" in his review for the San Antonio Express-News.

== Accolades ==
Award	Date of ceremony	Category	Recipient(s)	Result	Ref.
28th Annual Western Heritage Awards	March 18, 1989	Special Award for Outstanding Achievement in a New Format	Alamo: The Price of Freedom	Won	

== Works cited ==
=== Books ===
- Nofi, Albert (1992). The Alamo and the Texas War for Independence, September 30, 1835 to April 21, 1836: Heroes, Myths, and History. Combined Books. ISBN 0938289101.
- Stone, David; Ament, Vanessa (2017). Hollywood Sound Design and Moviesound Newsletter: A Case Study of the End of the Analog Age. Routledge. ISBN 9781138890640.

=== News ===
- "The premiere of a movie about the Alamo sparked..." United Press International. March 7, 1988. Archived from the original on March 13, 2025.
- Davis, Chuck (March 19, 1989). "Heritage Awards Keep Spirit of Old West Alive". The Oklahoman. Archived from the original on March 12, 2025.
- Hillinger, Charles (December 19, 1987). "Is New 'Alamo' Film History or Is It an Insult to Latinos?". Los Angeles Times. Archived from the original on March 13, 2025.
- Hillinger, Charles (December 31, 1987). "Latinos Ask for Changes in IMAX Alamo Film". Los Angeles Times. Archived from the original on March 13, 2025.
- Marini, Richard (August 17, 2023). "After 35 years, is it time to retire the IMAX film 'Alamo: The Price of Freedom'?". San Antonio Express-News. Archived from the original on January 14, 2025.

=== Newspapers ===
- "60 protest Alamo film at its debut". The Daily News. March 7, 1988. p. 7A – via Newspapers.com.
- "Alamo defenders face off at IMAX". Kerrville Daily Times. February 26, 1998. p. 9A – via Newspapers.com.
- "Alamo Movie To Be Shown At IMAX Theater". Tyler Morning Telegraph. July 2, 1987. p. Section 3 Page 5 – via Newspapers.com.
- "Angry San Antonio Latinos want 'Alamo' movie edited". Oakland Tribune. January 2, 1988. p. C3 – via Newspapers.com.
- "Another remake in the making". Grand Haven Tribune. August 12, 1987. p. 11 – via Newspapers.com.
- "Authentic Uniforms Part Of Event". McIntosh County Democrat. July 15, 1993. p. 1 – via Newspapers.com.
- "Bernice Strong". Los Angeles Times. December 19, 1987. p. Part VI - 10 – via Newspapers.com.
- "Build an Alamo". Fort Worth Star-Telegram. June 10, 1990. p. Section 1 Page 3 – via Newspapers.com.
- "Fort Worth". Times Record News. July 1, 1990. p. 8E – via Newspapers.com.
- "George McAlister watching his Alamo dream film come true". The Marshall News Messenger. March 7, 1988. p. 7B – via Newspapers.com.
- "Hispanic leaders blast Alamo film". Sioux City Journal. January 11, 1988. p. A1 – via Newspapers.com.
- "Hispanics protest film about Alamo". El Paso Times. March 5, 1988. p. 1A – via Newspapers.com.
- "Historical drama begins filming at Alamo Village". Del Rio News-Herald. July 26, 1987. p. 1C – via Newspapers.com.
- "IMAX Impact". Courier Journal. January 10, 1988. p. 15 – via Newspapers.com.
- "Making soldiers". San Angelo Standard-Times. July 26, 1987. p. E2 – via Newspapers.com.
- "New Alamo Film Gives Sense Of 'Being There'". Tyler Courier-Times. July 1, 1987. p. Section 3 Page 9 – via Newspapers.com.
- "Songwriters Ink Tune For Latest 'Alamo' Movie". Tyler Courier-Times. February 14, 1988. p. 9-6 – via Newspapers.com.
- "Texas' First IMAX Theater Opens With World Premiere". Tyler Morning Telegraph. March 4, 1988. p. 6-2 – via Newspapers.com.
- Builta, David (July 5, 1987). "Alamo Village gears up for new historical film". Del Rio News-Herald. p. 1A – via Newspapers.com.
- Cahalan, Steve (April 9, 1989). "Moultrie County man among dead at Alamo". Herald & Review. p. C6 – via Newspapers.com.
- Kerkhoff, Kathie (September 27, 1987). "Teacher gets memorable job at Alamo". South Bend Tribune. p. B2 – via Newspapers.com.
- Lapham, Bob (March 13, 1988). "New 'Alamo' is awesome". Abilene Reporter-News. p. 1E – via Newspapers.com.
- McCollum, Stephanie (July 26, 1987). "Santa Anna portrayed". San Angelo Standard-Times. p. 2E – via Newspapers.com.
- McCollum, Stephanie (July 26, 1987). "Village brings legend to life". San Angelo Standard-Times. p. 1A – via Newspapers.com.
- Means, Sean (May 19, 2002). "Utah Cinematographer Sees a Big Future in Large-Format Movies". The Salt Lake Tribune. p. D2 – via Newspapers.com.
- Mogle, Danny (June 19, 1987). "ET Native Shahan Courts Filmmakers". Tyler Morning Telegraph. p. 5-1 – via Newspapers.com.
- Price, Michael (June 1, 1990). "With this view, you'll fall with the Alamo". Fort Worth Star-Telegram. p. 7 – via Newspapers.com.
- Sedeno, David (August 16, 1987). "'Alamo' shooting finishes up; premiere due next spring". Corpus Christi Caller-Times. p. 4H – via Newspapers.com.
- Taggart, Patrick (August 14, 1987). "Alamo". Austin American-Statesman. p. D6 – via Newspapers.com.
- Taggart, Patrick (March 7, 1988). "'Alamo' paints Texas larger than life". Austin American-Statesman. p. D6 – via Newspapers.com.
- Taggart, Patrick (February 14, 1988). "Duel compromise". Austin American-Statesman. p. 4 – via Newspapers.com.
- Taggart, Patrick (January 8, 1988). "Hispanic leaders decry ethnic depictions in Alamo film". Austin American-Statesman. p. D8 – via Newspapers.com.
