= Lance Hool =

Mexican-American film director and producer

- Born: Lance Winston Hool Kamffer; Mexico City, Mexico
- Other name: Lance Winston
- Education: Universidad de las Américas Puebla
- Occupations: Film producer; film director; actor
- Years active: 1970–present
- Children: 3
- Mother: Constanza Hool

Lance Winston Hool Kamffer is a Mexican and American filmmaker and actor. He directed the action films Missing in Action 2: The Beginning (1985) and Steel Dawn (1987), the war film One Man's Hero (1999), and the romantic drama film 2 Hearts (2020). He founded the Santa Fe-based film studio Santa Fe Studios in 2011.

== Early life, family and education ==
Hool was born and raised in Mexico City, the son of an American father and a Mexican mother. His father, Alan, was a diplomat. His mother, Constanza, was an actress, dancer and choreographer who co-founded Ballet Folklórico de México. His maternal great-grandfather was painter David Alfaro Siqueiros. According to Hool, his great-grandfather worked as a financier for Charlie Chaplin. Hool and his brother were childhood friends of Bill Richardson, the governor of New Mexico from 2003 to 2011. His brother, Conrad, is also a filmmaker.

Hool attended the Universidad de las Américas Puebla, graduating with a B.A. and an M.B.A.

== Career ==
Hool made his acting debut in the Howard Hawks film Rio Lobo (1970), Hawks's last film before his death. He worked in the Mexican film industry for 20 years, and was the U.S. representative for the Mexican national film distribution company Pelmex between 1977 and 1980. During the 1970s, he co-starred in two Jorge Rivero Westerns, El payo - un hombre contra el mundo! (1972) and El payo - la montaña del diablo (1974), and played a supporting role in the American horror film Dogs (1977).

In America, Hool produced the thriller films Wolf Lake (1978), 10 to Midnight (1983), and The Evil That Men Do (1984), the adventure film Flipper (1996), and the comedy films Pure Luck (1991) with Sean Daniel and McHale's Navy (1997). Hool directed the Chuck Norris–starring action film Missing in Action 2: The Beginning, which was released in 1985. He also directed the 1987 science fiction action film Steel Dawn. It starred Patrick Swayze and was produced by Hool with his brother, Conrad Hool. Walter Goodman of The New York Times wrote, "Steel Dawn, ... has been directed by Lance Hool to emphasize Mr. Swayze's biceps," and Los Angeles Times critic Michael Wilmington wrote, "Hool directs all this so lethargically you might suspect he's gone missing in action himself." Hool directed and produced the historical war film One Man's Hero, about John Riley and the Saint Patrick's Battalion's role in the Mexican–American War, which was released in 1999. Hool cast his sons Brett and Jason in the film. For the Los Angeles Times, Kevin Thomas wrote in a review of the film that it was "directed with vigor and passion by Hool", while Paul Cullum of LA Weekly called his direction "flaccid". Hool then produced the Simon Wincer film Crocodile Dundee in Los Angeles (2001) and executive produced the Tony Scott film Man on Fire (2004).

Lance founded the Santa Fe–based film studio Santa Fe Studios in October 2011, where his son, Jason, was hired as president. It became New Mexico's second-largest film studio, following Albuquerque Studios. Negotiations to open the studio had taken place the year before, when, in an attempt to increase economic growth in Santa Fe, Richardson offered Hool a ten-million-dollar economic development grant to build the studio south of the city, while then–chairman of the Democratic Party of New Mexico structured the studio's land and financing package. The project was considered controversial among residents of Santa Fe due to Hool's early ties to Richardson. Hool and his associates were sued by attorneys for Santa Fe County for the studio's unpaid debt of over $2.3 million in 2016.

Hool directed the romantic drama film 2 Hearts, inspired by the story of Leslie and Jorge Bacardi of the Bacardi family after Hool's brother, Conrad, met Jorge on a cruise. It was co-written by Robin U. Russin with Hool's daughter, Veronica, and co-produced by Hool with Conrad with a score by Hool's son, Brett, and casting direction by his niece, Caral. The film finished principal photography in July 2018. It was released in theaters in October 2020 and distributed by Freestyle Releasing. After being released onto Netflix, the film became the platform's most-watched film for a week in 2021.

== Filmography ==
=== Film ===
Year	Title	Functioned as			Notes	Refs.
Year	Title	Director	Writer	Producer	Notes	Refs.
1984	Missing in Action	No	Story	Executive		
1985	Missing in Action 2: The Beginning	Yes	No	No	Directorial Debut	
1987	Steel Dawn	Yes	No	Yes		
1999	One Man's Hero	Yes	No	Yes		
2004	Club Dread	Assistant	No	Executive		
2020	2 Hearts	Yes	No	Yes		

==== Producer only ====
Year	Title	Director	Refs.
1979	Survival Run	Larry Spiegel	
1979	Wolf Lake	Burt Kennedy	
1980	Caboblanco	J. Lee Thompson	
1983	10 to Midnight	J. Lee Thompson	
1989	Options	Camilo Vila	
1989	Damned River	Michael Schroeder	
1991	Pure Luck	Nadia Tass	
1994	Roadflower	Deran Sarafian	
1994	Flashfire	Elliot Silverstein	
2001	Crocodile Dundee in Los Angeles	Simon Wincer	

==== Executive producer only ====
Year	Title	Director	Refs.
1984	The Evil That Men Do	J. Lee Thompson	
1993	Gunmen	Deran Sarafian	
1994	The Air Up There	Paul Michael Glaser	
1996	Flipper	Alan Shapiro	
1997	McHale's Navy	Bryan Spicer	
2004	Man on Fire	Tony Scott	
2011	The Cup	Simon Wincer	

==== Acting roles ====
Year	Title	Role	Notes	Refs.
1970	Soldier Blue	Guard	Uncredited	
1970	Rio Lobo	Pickett	Uncredited	
1971	Lawman	Lon	Uncredited	
1971	Intimidades de una secretaria	Blonde Man	Uncredited	
1972	Slaughter	Intern	Credited as 'Lance Winston'	
1972	El payo - un hombre contra el mundo!	Tom	Credited as 'Lance Winston'	
1974	Peor que los buitres	Peter		
1975	El payo - la montaña del diablo	Tom		
1975	Lucky Lady	Coast Guardsman	Uncredited	
1976	Dogs	Robbie Pulaski		
1977	El diabólico	The Colorado Kid		
1979	Survival Run	Narcotics Officer		

=== Television ===
==== Producer only ====
Year	Title	Director	Notes	Refs.
1988	The Tracker	John Guillermin	TV movie	
1993	The Cover Girl Murders	James A. Contner	TV movie	
2004	Caught in the Act	Jeffrey Reiner	TV movie	

==== Executive producer only ====
Year	Title	Director	Notes	Refs.
1993	Born to Run	Albert Magnoli	TV movie	

==== Acting roles ====
Year	Title	Role	Notes
1975	McCloud	Coy	Episode: "Three Guns for New York"
1975	Hawaii Five-O	Kim Hughes	Episode: "A Touch of Guilt"
1978	Police Story	Officer Skaggs	Episode: "River of Promises"
