= Patsy Swayze =

American choreographer and dancer (1927–2013)

- Born: Yvonne Helen Karnes; February 7, 1927; Houston, Texas, U.S.
- Died: September 16, 2013 (aged 86); Simi Valley, California, U.S.
- Occupations: Film choreographer, dancer, and dance instructor
- Spouse: Jesse Wayne Swayze (m. 1945; died 1982)
- Children: 5, including Patrick and Don
- Career
- Former groups: Houston Jazz Ballet Company; Swayze School of Dance

Yvonne Helen "Patsy" Swayze (née Karnes; February 7, 1927 – September 16, 2013) was an American film choreographer, dancer, and dance instructor, and the mother of actors Patrick Swayze and Don Swayze. Her credits include choreography for Urban Cowboy, Liar's Moon and Hope Floats.

== Early life ==
Swayze grew up in Houston, the daughter of Gladys Mae Karnes (née Snell), a nurse, and Victor Elliott Karnes, a World War I pilot and geologist.

When she was 10 years old, Swayze was hit by a car and her mother enrolled her in dance classes for therapy. She eventually trained in both jazz and classical ballet.

While in high school, she met and married Jesse Wayne "Buddy" Swayze, a mechanical engineer. The couple had five children, including actors Patrick Swayze and Don Swayze. The family lived on Wakefield Street in the Garden Oaks neighborhood of Houston. They later moved to another home on Del Norte Street.

== Career ==
In the 1960s, Swayze founded and directed both the Houston Jazz Ballet Company, and her own Houston dance studio, the Swayze School of Dance. All five of her children became dancers and actors, and Patsy's training has been credited for leading her son Patrick to his starring role in Dirty Dancing in 1987. Patrick met his future wife, film director and actress Lisa Niemi, while they were Patsy's students at the Swayze School of Dance.

In addition to her own dance studio, for eighteen years Swayze taught dance and choreography at the University of Houston. Her most famous students included future Emmy Award winner Debbie Allen, Randy Quaid, Jaclyn Smith and future ten-time Tony Award winner Tommy Tune.

Patsy Swayze transitioned to film by choreographing her first movie, Urban Cowboy, starring John Travolta and Debra Winger. The success of Urban Cowboy essentially launched her career as a film choreographer.

In 1981, Patsy Swayze moved from Houston to southern California. She choreographed numerous films over the next three decades, including Liar's Moon in 1982 and Hope Floats in 1998. She teamed with her daughter-in-law Lisa Niemi to choreograph the 2003 film, One Last Dance, which starred Niemi, Patrick Swayze and George de la Peña.

She planned to retire from teaching and focus on film work, but instead opened a dance studio in a Simi Valley shopping center that operated for more than twenty years.

== Death ==
On September 8, 2013, Swayze had a stroke at the age of 86. She died of stroke complications eight days later at her home in Simi Valley.

Swayze was predeceased by her parents; her husband, who died of a heart attack at the age of 57 in 1982; her oldest daughter Vicky Lynn, who died from a suicide involving a drug overdose in 1994 at the age of 45; her actor son Patrick, who died of pancreatic cancer in 2009 at the age of 57; her sisters, Kathryn Buildt and Diana Latham; and her brother, Elliott Karnes. Her younger son Sean, who served as an "entertainment Teamster," died in 2025 from an upper gastrointestinal bleed caused by "severe metabolic acidosis, esophageal varices, and alcoholic liver cirrhosis," at the age of 63.
