= Soledad Acosta (singer) =

Sara Lilia Sánchez Acosta (born 13 July 1941), known professionally as Soledad Acosta, is a Mexican singer, actress, and dancer.

A native of Camargo, Chihuahua, Acosta began her career as a dancer and performed with Constanza Hool. She was a member of several ballet companies and also appeared in several television programs, including Revista Musical Nescafé, Max Factor: las estrellas y usted, El estudio Raleigh de Pedro Vargas. She was discovered by a publicist and TV producer who saw her dancing at the nightclub Los Globos.

Acosta portrayed La Malinche in the film El juicio de Martín Cortés (1974), directed by Alejandro Galindo. She formed part of a delegation that Mexico's Secretariat of Tourism sent to Japan. In 1976, her single "Consejos a mi hijo" was a best-selling record.

== Discography ==
- Consejos a mi hijo (Falcon, 1976)
- Qué chulita estás... (Falcon, 1977)

== Filmography ==
- Mujeres, mujeres, mujeres (1967)
- El pistolero desconocido (1967)
- El centauro Pancho Villa (1967)
- Luna de miel en Puerto Rico (1969)
- El crepúsculo de un dios (1969)
- Los juniors (1970)
- La hermanita Dinamita (1970)
- Quinto patio (1970)
- El quelite (1970)
- Correa Cotto: así me llaman! (1970)
- Los dos hermanos (1971)
- El medio pelo (1972)
- Santo y el águila real (1973)
- El sargento Perez (1973)
- El juicio de Martín Cortés (1974)
