= Don Swayze =

American actor (born 1958)

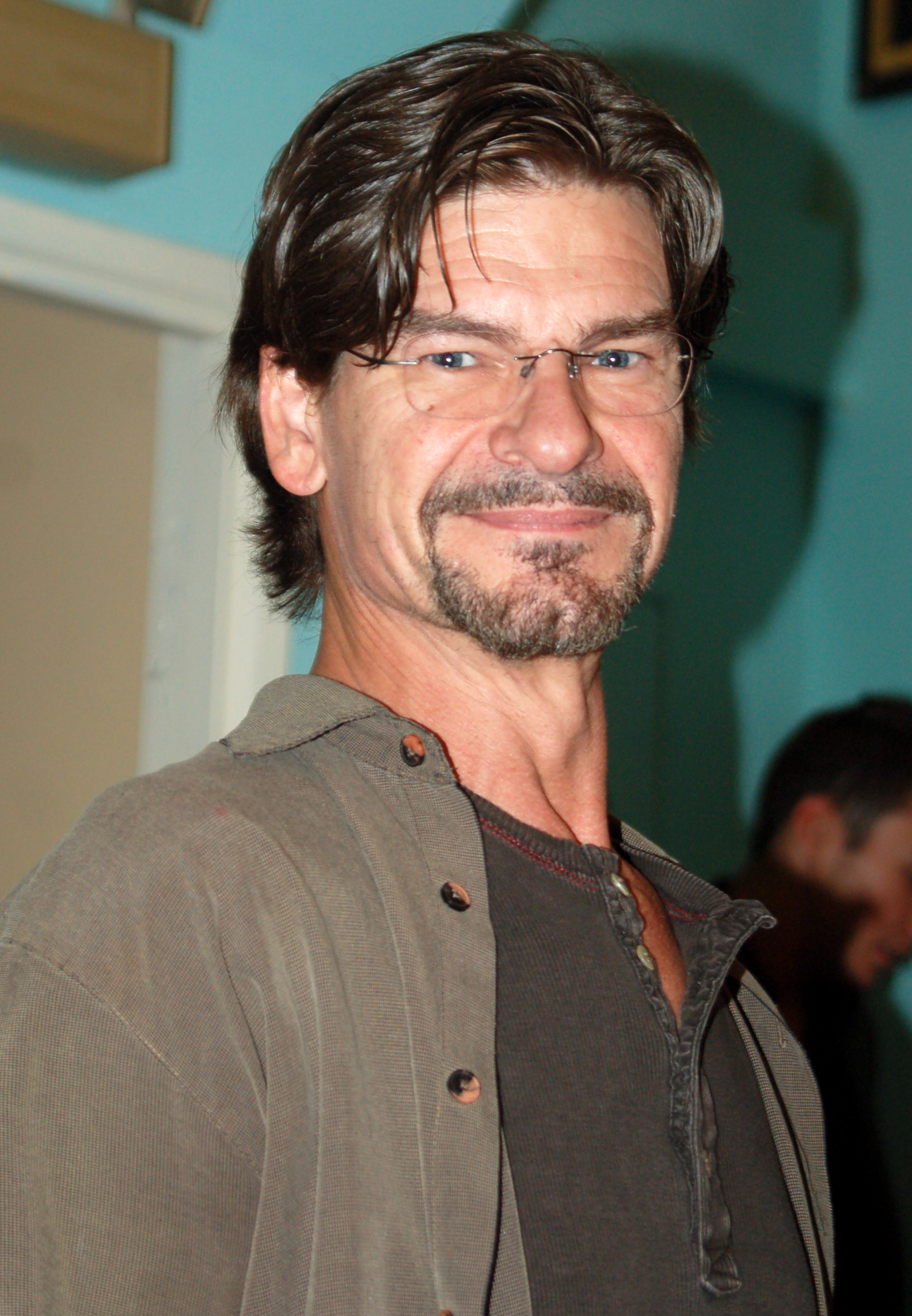
- Swayze in 2010
- Born: Donald Carl Swayze; August 10, 1958 (age 68); Houston, Texas, U.S.
- Occupation: Actor
- Years active: 1980–present
- Spouses: Marcia Swayze (m. 1985; div. 1993) Charlene Lindstrom (m. 2014)
- Children: 1
- Parents: Jesse Wayne Swayze (father); Patsy Swayze (mother)
- Relatives: Patrick Swayze (brother); Lisa Niemi (sister-in-law)

Donald Carl Swayze (born August 10, 1958) is an American actor, noted for acting in dramatic series and soap operas as well as several feature films, and theatrical work.

== Early life ==
Swayze was born in Houston, Texas, the middle child of Patsy Swayze (née Karnes; 1927–2013), a dance teacher; and Jesse Wayne Swayze (1925–82), an engineering draftsman. Patsy owned a dance studio where neighborhood students took dance lessons. Donald and his older brother Patrick Swayze (1952–2009), both attended and graduated from Frank Black Junior High School and then Waltrip High School in northwest Houston. He also had an older sister, Vickie Lynn (1949–94). Donald also had one younger brother, Sean Kyle (1962–2025), and one younger sister Bora Song "Bambi" (born 1966), who was adopted by the Swayzes.

== Career ==
=== Film ===
Swayze's film work has included an appearance as a dancer in the 1980 film Urban Cowboy, as Ruben in the film Father for Charlie, and as Mark in the film Shy People, along with a role alongside Corey Feldman in a movie called Edge of Honor where he played the part of Ritchie, a "Homicidal Lumberjack". He had a brief (2 minute) cameo appearance role as Obnoxious Guy in The Cutting Edge: Going for the Gold (Video 2006) - IMDb. He also played Col. Sherman Rutherford in a western–noir hybrid titled Heathens and Thieves in 2012. He also starred in the film Death Ring, and as the Alamo courier James Bonham in Alamo: The Price of Freedom, an IMAX film shown in San Antonio, Texas.

=== Television ===
Swayze played Pug in episode 13 of the 1985 show Street Hawk, and Tommy Jenks in the 1989 episode of Matlock "The Thoroughbred". He performed the role of James (Jim) Mackey in the seventh episode of season five on the Netflix series Longmire. He appeared in two soap operas: The Young and the Restless and Days of Our Lives. In 2010, Swayze guest-starred in six episodes in a recurring role as Gus, a werewolf, on the HBO series True Blood. His television drama work includes multiple appearances in Murder, She Wrote, The X-Files, NYPD Blue, NCIS, Carnivàle, and dozens of other programs. Swayze had a role as an intellectually disabled man suspected of murder in an episode of the television drama Matlock. In 1989 he portrayed a member of a gang that held hostages in the hotel in the Western drama Paradise. He played Jesse James in a season-two episode of Lois & Clark: The New Adventures of Superman. He played the demon Lucius in an episode of Charmed in 2005. He had a recurring role on Criminal Minds, specifically the episodes "The Big Game" and "Revelations", in which he played Charles Hankel, the father and alternate personality of serial killer Tobias Hankel. On Cold Case, Swayze played the adult Grant Hall. Swayze had a small guest appearance on It's Always Sunny in Philadelphia as a crazy boat captain. He has also appeared on Beyond Belief: Fact or Fiction as Anatole in the twelfth episode of the third season and The Bridge. Swayze also appeared in an episode of Sons of Anarchy. In 2017, he joined the cast of General Hospital for a stint in the role of Buzz. Additional roles include a non-speaking role as rapist William Dollar on L.A. Law. In 2019, Swayze appeared in the season premiere of American Horror Story: 1984, the ninth installment of the FX horror anthology television series American Horror Story, and played Dennis Seacrest, a murderous henchman working for George Hearst, in Deadwood: The Movie that same year.

=== Stage ===
In 2001, Swayze was on stage as Pedro in Man of La Mancha at the Simi Valley Cultural Arts Center. In 2005, he played Roy in the comedy Lone Star at the Beverly Hills Playhouse. In the fall of 2011, he co-starred with Anne Archer in an original stage play titled Jane Fonda: In the Court of Public Opinion at the Edgemar Theater in Santa Monica, California; he played U.S. Army Sgt. Don Simpson (retired), a wounded veteran of the Vietnam War.

== Personal life ==
Don Swayze is an avid cyclist and skydiver, and races cross country mountain bikes in his spare time. Don is married to Charlene Swayze. Don has one child. Don and Charlene have established an animal therapy ranch in San Diego County, California, known as Swayze Ranch. Charlene has also established the Swayze Foundation.

== Filmography ==
=== Film ===
Year	Title	Role	Notes
1987	Shy People	Mark	
1987	Death Blow: A Cry for Justice	Andy	
1988	Alamo: The Price of Freedom	James Bonham	Short
1989	Driving Force	Nelson	
1989	Trapper County War	Walt Luddigger	
1991	Edge of Honor	Ritchie	
1991	Payback	Jeremy	
1992	Death Ring	John Blackwell	Video
1993	Body of Influence	Biker	Video
1993	Eye of the Stranger	Rudy	
1993	Beach Babes from Beyond	Gork	
1993	Broken Trust	Sgt. Barnes	
1994	The Other Man	Curran	
1994	Forced to Kill	Dwayne	
1994	Pontiac Moon	Local	
1995	Digital Man	Billy	
1996	Squanderers	Scott	
1998	Evasive Action	Ian Kellen	
2000	The Prophet's Game	Joseph Highsmith	
2003	Lady Jayne: Killer	Fred	
2004	Knuckle Sandwich	Larry	
2005	Waterborne	Otis	
2006	The Cutting Edge: Going for the Gold	Obnoxious Guy	Video
2006	The Visitation	Abe	
2007	The Colony	State Dept. Official #1"	Short
2008	Prairie Fever	James	Video
2009	Powder Blue	Bouncer	
2010	Quit	Ward	
2011	Miss Feet	Jesus	Short
2012	Lizzie	Daniel Allen	
2012	Heathens and Thieves	Sherman	
2012	Ambush at Dark Canyon	Chale Lord	
2014	Iniquitios	John Duncan	Short
2014	The Appearing	Sheriff Hendricks	
2014	Nellie Nellie	Mr. Townsend	Short
2015	The Night Crew	Big Willy	
2019	Beneath the Leaves	Whitley Senior	
2024	On Swift Horses	Terence	
2025	Honey Don't!	Gary (piano bar)	
TBA	All Saints Day	Kier Connolly	Post-production

=== Television ===
Year	Title	Role	Notes
1984	I Married a Centerfold	Actor #2	TV movie
1985	Street Hawk	Pug	Episode: "Follow the Yellow Gold Road"
1985	J.O.E. and the Colonel	Max Carney	TV movie
1986	Prince of Bel Air	Darryl	TV movie
1986	Tall Tales & Legends	Groom	Episode: "My Darlin' Clementine"
1986	The Fall Guy	Stretch	Episode: "War on Wheels"
1986	1st & Ten	Clay Daniels	Episode: "A Second Chance"
1986	L.A. Law	William Dollar	Episode: "Pilot"
1988	Dead or Alive	Brewer	TV movie
1989	Paradise	Langston	Episode: "A House Divided"
1989	Matlock	Tommy Jenks	Episode: "The Thoroughbred"
1989	Hunter	Lyle	Episode: "On Air"
1990	The World According to Straw	Abalone	TV movie
1991	Dragnet	Pete Brown	Episode: "The Vandals"
1991	The New Adam-12	Don	Episode: "Families"
1991–1993	Murder, She Wrote	Gus Tardio / Edge Potter	2 episodes
1992	Columbo	Albert Wagner	Episode: "No Time to Die"
1993	Dark Justice	Fitzimmons	Episode: "Crash Course"
1993	Renegade	John Poe / T-Bone	2 episodes
1993	Beyond Suspicion	Duke	TV movie
1995	A Father for Charlie	Reuben Cantwell	TV movie
1995	NYPD Blue	Alex	2 episodes
1995	Lois & Clark: The New; Adventures of Superman	Jesse James	Episode: "Tempus Fugitive"
1995	Walker, Texas Ranger	Harry Peterson	Episode: "The Guardians"
1995	Land's End	Thomas Dwayne Boller	Episode: "A Line in the Sand"
1998	The Magnificent Seven	Gage Lawless	Episode: "Inmate 78"
1998	Babylon 5: Thirdspace	Raider Leader	TV movie (uncredited)
1998	Profiler	Gelb	Episode: "Do the Right Thing"
1999–2000	Movie Stars	Don Swayze	14 episodes
2000	Beyond Belief: Fact or Fiction	William Pope	Episode: "Anatole"
2000–2002	V.I.P.	Merrick	2 episodes
2001–2004	The Division	Gary Gold / Elvin 'Tupelo' Seaforth	2 episodes
2002	The X-Files	Terry Pruit	Episode: "Hellbound"
2003	Tremors	Orville James	Episode: "Water Hazard"
2003–2005	Carnivàle	Tattooed Man	6 episodes
2004	Karen Sisco	Jackie	Episode: "No One's Girl"
2004–2021	NCIS	Logan Clay / Peter Walker	2 episodes
2005	CSI: Miami	Norm Buford	Episode: "Nothing to Lose"
2005	Charmed	Lucius	Episode: "Little Box of Horrors"
2005	Without a Trace	Randy Stone	Episode: "Lost Time"
2006	Love, Inc.	Troy	Episode: "Major Dad"
2006	My Name Is Earl	Bail Bonds Man	Episode: "The Bounty Hunter"
2006	Shark	Beau Dawkins	Episode: "Déjà Vu All Over Again"
2007	Mystery Woman: In the Shadows	Bishop	TV movie
2007	Criminal Minds	Charles Hankel	2 episodes
2007	Cold Case	Grant Hall - 2007	Episode: "Shuffle, Ball Change"
2008	CSI: Crime Scene Investigation	Dave Bohr	Episode: "The Theory of Everything"
2009–2017	Family Guy	Patrick Swayze (voice)	2 episodes
2010	True Blood	Gus	6 episodes
2010	The Young and the Restless	Shaw Roberts	5 episodes
2010	It's Always Sunny in Philadelphia	Ray	Episode: "The Gang Buys a Boat"
2010	Passenger	Kylek	2 episodes
2011	Days of Our Lives	Pawn Broker / Rip	3 episodes
2012	Wilfred	Shady Guy	Episode: "Letting Go"
2013	Southland	Gus Jameson	Episode: "Under the Big Top"
2013	Hawaii Five-0	Lloyd Grimes	Episode: "Ho'opio"
2013	The Bridge	Tampa Tim	4 episodes
2014	Blood Type	James Ryder	Episode: "A Rare and Precious Commodity"
2014	Sons of Anarchy	Carl Egan	Episode: "The Separation of Crows"
2016	Longmire	Jim Mackey	Episode: "From This Day Forward"
2017	General Hospital	Buzz	Episode #1.13720
2017	Tucker's War	Charlie Caleb Carson	2 episodes
2017	Decker	General Coover	Episode: "Space Wall"
2019	Deadwood: The Movie	Dennis Seacrest	TV movie
2019	American Horror Story: 1984	Ed Gibson	Episode: "Camp Redwood”
2020	Sons of Thunder	Angie D.	5 episodes
2020	The Rookie	Sgt. Sharp	Episode: "Under the Gun"
2021	Lucifer	Gas Station Owner	Episode: "Pin the Tail on the Daddy"
2022	Magnum P.I.	Melvin Muchado	Episode: "Run, Baby, Run"
2022	NCIS: Hawaiʻi	Joe	Episode: "Primal Fear"
2023	Perry Mason	Man at Business Meeting	Episode: "Chapter Fifteen"
