= Buenas noches, Buenos Aires =

1964 film

- Poster
- Directed by: Hugo del Carril
- Written by: Rodolfo M. Taboada
- Produced by: Alfredo Capalbo; Hugo del Carril; Adrián Larralde
- Starring: Hugo del Carril; Virginia Luque; Tito Lusiardo; Roberto Esacalda; Palito Ortega
- Cinematography: Humberto Peruzzi
- Edited by: José Serra
- Music by: Mariano Mores
- Distributed by: Distribuidora D.A.S.A.
- Release date: October 10, 1964
- Country: Argentina
- Language: Spanish language

Buenas noches, Buenos Aires is a 1964 Argentine musical film comedy directed by and starring Hugo del Carril. The film was premièred in Buenos Aires on October 10, 1964.

Organized by Del Carril, the film reminisces over the culture of tango films that dominated the Cinema of Argentina in the 1930s, 1940s and 1950s, and united tango actors such as Hugo del Carril, Tito Lusiardo and Virginia Luque and Roberto Escalada as well as starring new actors such as Palito Ortega.

== Cast ==
Julio Sosa (centre)

- Hugo del Carril
- Beba Bidart
- Los Cantores de Salavina
- Los Cinco Latinos
- Roberto Escalada
- Néstor Fabián
- Ramona Galarza
- Roberto Grela
- Los Hermanos Abalos
- Constanza Hool
- Elizabeth Killian
- Ambar La Fox
- Susy Leiva
- Virginia Luque
- Tito Lusiardo
- Ubaldo Martínez
- Mariano Mores
- Palito Ortega
- Antonio Prieto
- Los Quilla-Huasi
- Pedrito Rico
- Violeta Rivas
- Jorge Sobral
- Julio Sosa
- Aníbal Troilo
- Argentinita Vélez
- Enzo Viena
- Víctor Ayos
- Antonio Prieto
