= I'm Gonna Explode =

- Directed by: Gerardo Naranjo
- Screenplay by: Gerardo Naranjo
- Starring: Juan Pablo de Santiago
- Cinematography: Tobias Datum
- Edited by: Yibran Asuad
- Release date: 2008
- Language: Spanish

I'm Gonna Explode (Spanish: Voy a explotar), also known as I'm Going to Explode, is a 2008 Mexican thriller film written and directed by Gerardo Naranjo.

The film premiered in the Horizons section at the 65th edition of the Venice Film Festival.

== Cast ==
- Juan Pablo de Santiago as Román
- Maria Deschamps as Maru
- Martha Claudia Moreno as Helena
- Daniel Giménez Cacho as Dip. Eugenio Valdez
- Rebecca Jones as Eva
- Renato Ornelas as Tulio
- Gustavo González as Pablo
- Carlos Narro as Professor Belmont
- Ximena Romo as Lucía
- Denis Soto as Pepa
- Mauricio Porras as Beto

== Reception ==
On the review aggregator website Rotten Tomatoes, 71% of 28 critics' reviews are positive, with an average rating of 6.00/10.
