= Dangerous (2021 film) =

2021 film by David Hackl

- Theatrical release poster
- Directed by: David Hackl
- Written by: Chris Borrelli
- Produced by: Kevin DeWalt; Ben DeWalt; Doug Falconer
- Starring: Scott Eastwood; Tyrese Gibson; Famke Janssen; Kevin Durand; Mel Gibson
- Cinematography: Mark Dobrescru
- Edited by: Jackie Dzuba
- Music by: Todd Bryanton
- Production companies: Minds Eye Entertainment; Falconer Pictures
- Distributed by: Lionsgate (US and UK); Minds Eye Entertainment (Canada); International Film Trust (International)
- Release date: November 5, 2021
- Running time: 99 minutes
- Countries: Canada; United States
- Language: English
- Budget: $10 million

Dangerous is a 2021 action thriller film directed by David Hackl and starring Scott Eastwood, Tyrese Gibson, Famke Janssen, Kevin Durand, and Mel Gibson. The film was released on November 5, 2021. It was David Hackl's fifth film as director. Dangerous was produced by Kevin DeWalt, Ben DeWalt and Doug Falconer under the banners of Minds Eye Entertainment and Falconer Pictures; and marks the last film of Falconer as a producer - he suddenly died in July 2021 before the release of the film. The film was distributed in the United States and the United Kingdom by Lionsgate. It received negative reviews from critics for its plot and action.

== Plot ==
Dylan Forrester, a psychopath and former assassin, is suppressing his instincts and taking mood stabiliser medication Lithium (which is incorrectly described on the bottle in the movie), supervised by Dr. Alderwood. He dodges his parole to travel to Guardian Island, an island owned by his family, to reconcile after the sudden death of his brother, Sean. His mother, Linda Forrester, despises him for his true nature and encourages him to leave. Meanwhile, Agent Shaughnessy is trying to track Dylan down for dodging his parole believing he's too dangerous. Sheriff McCoy, Guardian Island's Sheriff discovers Dylan is a wanted fugitive and arrests him and locks him in the island's bunker.

A fixer named Cole lands on the island with his crew of mercenaries and kills Sheriff McCoy. A hotel employee named Jo hears the attack and teams up with Dylan to escape, letting him go. When Cole's crew raid the house, one of his crew is knocked out by Dylan after calling the crew informing them Dylan escaped. The crew leave the house to search for Dylan. Dylan returns to the house and helps his family protect themselves. Dylan kills two of Cole's crew and has suspicions that Sean was hiding something in the house that led Cole to the island. Cole claims that nobody on the island is of importance to him and that he only wants what's on the island. Dylan and the survivors find a secret passage set up by Sean. Dylan realizes that Sean partnered with Cole to buy the island believing something valuable is there. The family enters the passage and discovers a Japanese submarine containing Yamashita's Gold stolen during World War 2.

Cole's mercenaries find the secret lair and a shootout begins; Massey and Dylan fight back against the mercenaries using one of the submarine's deck guns. Cole holds Linda at gunpoint and forces Dylan to help him steal the gold. Massey tries to shoot Cole with the deck gun but Cole kills him instead. Dylan refuses Cole and throws the gold he tried to steal into the water. They are ambushed by Agent Shaughnessy, who's shot and wounded by Cole. Cole tries to throw Linda into the water and she's left hanging from a platform. Dylan stabs Cole to death and throws him into the water and saves his mother. The survivors leave the island and Dylan takes some of the gold. Dylan bids farewell to Dr. Alderwood in a phone call and dumps his mood stabilising medication into the ocean.

== Cast ==
- Scott Eastwood as Dylan "D" Forrester
- Tyrese Gibson as Sheriff McCoy
- Famke Janssen as Agent Shaughnessy
- Kevin Durand as Cole
- Mel Gibson as Dr. Alderwood
- Brendan Fletcher as Massey
- Ryan Robbins as Felix
- Brenda Bazinet as Linda Forrester
- Leanne Lapp as Susan Forrester
- Chad Rook as Blanchard
- Brock Morgan as Pike
- Destiny Millns as Jo
- Atlee Smallman as Freddie Forrester
- Jayce Barreiro as Sniper

== Production ==
In November 2020, it was announced that Scott Eastwood and Tyrese Gibson were set to star in the film alongside Mel Gibson. Later that month, the film was presented to buyers at the American Film Market. Filming began in late November 2020 and occurred at various parts of Canada including Kamloops and the Okanagan. Principal photography took place in December 2020, and concluded on December 23. During the shooting in Kamloops amidst the COVID-19 outbreak, Tyrese Gibson donated his unused hotel rooms to a homeless family. His gesture received wide coverage including that from People magazine.

By the end of December 2020, Dangerous was sold to multiple international territories including Germany, Spain, Portugal, Eastern Europe, the Middle-East and the Commonwealth of Independent States. In March 2021, Lionsgate acquired the distribution rights for the US, UK and Canada.

== Release ==
In October 2021, Lionsgate revealed the official poster of the film. Dangerous was released in the US and Canada theatres as well as on-demand on 5 November 2021. On 18 November, it was released in the Middle East followed by release in Europe in mid-December 2021. Dangerous received worldwide DVD and Blu-ray release on 14 December 2021.

== Reception ==
On the review aggregator website Rotten Tomatoes, 30% of 20 critics' reviews are positive. Metacritic, which uses a weighted average, assigned the film a score of 27 out of 100, based on 5 critics, indicating "generally unfavorable" reviews.

The film was nominated at the 10th Canadian Screen Awards in two categories as well as in two categories at the Golden Raspberry Awards. Dangerous hit Netflix Top 10 Movies in the Netherlands for three weeks in January 2022. The film hit Amazon Prime TOP 10 in Italy, Germany and the US where it stayed for more than seven weeks. Overall, the film hit Top 10 in 17 countries across various streaming services.
