= The Beast (2009 TV series) =

- Genre: Crime drama; Action
- Created by: Vincent Angell; William Rotko
- Written by: Vincent Angell; Mark Goffman; Raymond Hartung; William Rotko; Wendy West
- Directed by: John Badham; Sanford Bookstaver; Jeremiah S. Chechik; Michael Dinner; Ken Girotti; Charles Haid; Christopher Leitch; Christine Moore; Lisa Niemi; Steve Shill; Tom Verica; Michael W. Watkins
- Starring: Patrick Swayze; Travis Fimmel
- Theme music composer: W. G. Snuffy Walden
- Composers: W. G. Snuffy Walden; A. Patrick Rose
- Country of origin: United States
- Original language: English
- No. of seasons: 1
- No. of episodes: 13 (list of episodes)

Production
- Executive producers: Vincent Angell; Cory Concoff; Allan Loeb; Steven Pearl; John Romano; William Rotko
- Producer: Lynn Raynor
- Cinematography: Roy H. Wagner
- Editors: Bill Johnson; Rob Seidenglanz; Debra Weinfeld
- Running time: 43 min
- Production companies: Rooney McP Productions; Angell and Rotko; Trotwood Productions; Scarlet Fire Entertainment; Sony Pictures Television

Original release
- Network: A&E
- Release: January 15 – April 23, 2009

The Beast is an American crime drama series starring Patrick Swayze and Travis Fimmel. The series, which only ran for one season, aired on A&E from January 15 to April 23, 2009. It was Swayze's final acting performance before his death in 2009. Despite receiving largely positive reviews from critics, it garnered low Nielsen ratings and was cancelled in early June 2009, three months before Swayze’s death.

== Plot ==
Set in Chicago, veteran middle-aged FBI agent Charles Barker applies controversial techniques in his attempts to bring criminals to justice, which often border on illegal and unsettle his uninitiated rookie partner, Ellis Dove. Over the course of the first season, Barker is investigated by fellow FBI agents for alleged misconduct. Dove's loyalty to his partner is challenged when FBI internal affairs agent Ray Beaumont (Larry Gilliard) approaches him to gain information. Shortly thereafter, Dove learns of darker secrets in Barker's past.

== Characters ==
- Charles Barker (Patrick Swayze) is a veteran FBI agent, and an expert at going undercover, gaining the confidence of criminals and setting them up for a long hard fall in prison. As skilled an actor as he is a cop, Barker has taken a rookie agent—Ellis Dove—under his wing. Barker acts as Ellis's acting coach, trainer, and mentor. Barker appears to be a patriot whose loyalty should go unquestioned, but his superiors think he has been seduced into criminal activity. In the pilot episode, it is revealed that he is fluent in Russian and that he is being investigated by the FBI.
- Ellis Dove (Travis Fimmel) is a rookie FBI agent and Charles Barker's trainee in the undercover trade. Under intense pressure from Barker to become a chameleon, Ellis never knows when Barker will send him on some impossible little test, some on-the-spot improv that may or may not cost him his life. Stressed, tense, and under impossible performance pressure, Ellis needs a break. However, that's not the worst of it; an Internal Affairs team is trying to recruit Ellis to spy on his mentor Barker.
- Harry Conrad (Kevin J O'Connor) is an FBI agent who appears to be Barker's handler at the FBI, and he's supervising Ellis as well. As a seasoned professional, he knows Barker well enough to speak to him in terse personal code—but for newbie Ellis, he needs to spell things out, including his deep respect for Barker's work.
- Rose Lawrence (Lindsay Pulsipher) is Ellis's neighbor, with whom he shares a romantic relationship. A law student, she is sharp enough to spot something odd about Ellis (who keeps his job a closely guarded secret) and takes the relationship slowly.
- Ray Beaumont (Larry Gilliard) is a fellow FBI Agent working for Internal Affairs who is investigating Charles Barker. Sly and sneaky in his ways, he attempts to use Ellis to get information to help make his case that Barker is dirty.

== Episodes ==
No.	Title	Directed by	Written by	Original release date	US viewers (millions)
1	"Pilot"	Michael Dinner	Vincent Angell, William Rotko	January 15, 2009	2.45
The mischievous Barker hazes Dove as they go undercover on their first case to infiltrate a weapons smuggling ring.
2	"Two Choices"	Michael Dinner	William L. Rotko	January 22, 2009	1.55
Barker and Ellis are assigned to take down a major drug trafficking ring.
3	"Nadia"	Christine Moore	Vincent Angell	January 29, 2009	1.35
Barker and Ellis take on one of the nastiest and sleaziest rackets in the world--human trafficking.
4	"Infected"	John Badham	Ray Hartung	February 5, 2009	TBA
Barker's old pal, Marcus, a security guard at ritzy jewelry store, gets Barker and Ellis involved in a nerve-wracking case involving millions of dollars and a deadly virus.
5	"Bitsy Big-Boy"	Michael W. Watkins	Vincent Angell	February 12, 2009	TBA
May Nan Nhung, a top nuclear physicist, has been doing some dangerous research, and now somebody's trying to kill her.
6	"Hothead"	Sanford Bookstaver	John Romano	February 19, 2009	TBA
There's nothing more dangerous than an FBI agent who's gone rogue, and Frank Oland may be one of them.
7	"Capone"	Ken Girotti	Wendy West	February 26, 2009	TBA
A fellow agent vanishes, sending Barker undercover to infiltrate a group of Latino drug dealers who may have something to do with the man's disappearance. Lou Diamond Phillips guest stars.
8	"Mercy"	Tom Verica	Mark Goffman & William L. Rotko	March 5, 2009	TBA
Homeless veterans are being murdered, sending Barker undercover as a homeless man to investigate. Ellis, a veteran himself, takes the case very personally.
9	"The Walk In"	Jeremiah S. Chechik	Mark Goffman	March 19, 2009	TBA
Barker and Ellis investigate a Chinese spy posing as a university professor. Adding difficulty to the probe is a fellow agent who doubts Ellis' abilities and attempts to sabotage his work.
10	"Tilt"	Charles Haid	William L. Rotko, Keith Schreier	March 26, 2009	TBA
Barker and Ellis infiltrate a high-stakes poker game to sniff out the assassin who's after an informant who's about to enter the witness protection program. Features the song "Raspberry Rush" by The Promise Ring.
11	"My Brother's Keeper"	Lisa Niemi	Vincent Angell & Wendy West	April 9, 2009	TBA
Barker goes after an Irish crime family seeking to expand their business from Chicago to Wall Street. Directed by series star Patrick Swayze's wife, Lisa Niemi.
12	"Counterfeit"	Chris Leitch	Mark Goffman & Ray Hartung	April 16, 2009	TBA
Having been set up as a murderer, Barker finds himself on the lam, and the Bureau has a relentless agent hunting him down.
13	"No Turning Back"	Steve Shill	Vincent Angell, William Rotko	April 23, 2009	TBA
Barker gets a list of six names of people who were involved in the Red Gauntlet operation, and he and Ellis, with help from Todd and Conrad, must track them down before they can get to Barker.

== Reception ==
Alan Sepinwall writes "... you watch Swayze in The Beast, and you realize that this is the best performance of his career—that the opportunity to play a part like this, and to play it as well as he is, may be fueling his ability to keep fighting against the cancer. And you realize, in an odd silver lining, that the cancer may, in turn, be fueling the performance". The New York Times reported that "Patrick Swayze's performance... is impressive for its resistance to cliché...".

Suzan Young of RealNetworks stated that, "Patrick Swayze gives the performance of a lifetime as the hard-edged FBI agent Charles Barker in A&E's The Beast".

In his review, Ray Richmond of The Hollywood Reporter stated that, "Beast has a far grittier feel and look than one would suspect from a show starring Swayze—not to mention one on A&E. The action often is energetic and intriguing but is sometimes brought down by Fimmel's uneven performance. ...What's unmistakable is the killer work of the star. May the man somehow beat the odds and fight defiantly on".

Kelly West of Cinema Blend reported that, "For an original series, I think A&E has something great on their hands. The Beast is definitely drama series with an edge, showing the darker, grittier side to FBI undercover work".

Ken Tucker writes that the lines said by the "antihero" and main character "[were] old when Clint Eastwood was Dirty Harry". Tucker adds that the co-star (Travis Fimmel as Ellis Dove) gives "inexpressive line readings; he's here because he's young and pretty (Fimmel was a model), and he fits A&E's desired viewing demo. Ellis is the newbie who earns Barker's respect...". Overall, Tucker grades the program as a "C".

== Home media ==
Sony Pictures Home Entertainment released the series on Region 1 DVD in the United States and region 2 in the United Kingdom on August 18, 2009. This release has been discontinued and is out of print.

On February 16, 2016, Mill Creek Entertainment re-released The Beast – The Complete Series on DVD in Region 1.

== International broadcast ==
In the UK, the show was broadcast on the channel Five US. Its first episode was shown on 18 February 2009. The show is also streamed in Australia on 7Plus.
