= Steel Dawn =

1987 film by Lance Hool

- Theatrical release poster
- Directed by: Lance Hool
- Written by: Doug Lefler
- Produced by: Conrad Hool; Edgar Bold; Lance Hool
- Starring: Patrick Swayze; Lisa Niemi; Christopher Neame; Brett Hool; Brion James; Anthony Zerbe
- Cinematography: George Tirl
- Edited by: Mark Conte
- Music by: Brian May
- Distributed by: Vestron, Inc.
- Release date: November 6, 1987
- Running time: 101 minutes
- Country: United States
- Language: English
- Budget: $3,500,000
- Box office: $562,187

Steel Dawn is a 1987 American post-apocalyptic science fiction action film directed by Lance Hool and starring Patrick Swayze and Lisa Niemi. The working title of the film, which mixes the genres of science fiction and western, was Desert Warrior.

== Plot ==
Nomad (Patrick Swayze), a swordsman, wanders through the desert in a post-World War III world. He searches for his mentor's killer, the assassin Sho (Christopher Neame). In the past, Nomad had a position of privilege as a soldier of the elite guard. Nomad's family were killed and this continues to torture him. Nomad encounters a group of settlers in the town of Meridian. Damnil (Anthony Zerbe), a local landowner, and his gang are attacking the town to gain a monopoly on the local water supply. Nomad stays at a local farm owned by the widow Kasha (Lisa Niemi). She has a son, Jux, who quickly endears himself to Nomad. Kasha reveals to Nomad that she has a source of pure water under her land and plans to eventually irrigate the whole valley.

Nomad teams up with Kasha's foreman, Tark (Brion James), to oppose Damnil and his bullying tactics. Meanwhile, Nomad and Kasha's relationship becomes romantic. Sho and some of Damnil's men show up in town, leading to Sho and Nomad having a brutal staff fight. Tark attempts to help Nomad and is stabbed in the abdomen by Sho and dies. Jux is kidnapped by Damnil's men. Nomad plans to rescue Jux, but is locked in a safe with his sword by Kasha. She goes to Damnil's farm alone, offering to reveal her source of water if they free Jux. A stand-off ensues, allowing Jux to escape. As Damnil's men chase him down, Nomad comes just in time to save Jux's life. Nomad and Jux return to Damnil's farm to rescue Kasha. Nomad has a final battle with Sho. Nomad is victorious and kills Damnil as well. The valley begins Kasha's irrigation project. Nomad bids farewell to Kasha and Jux. They watch as he walks into the desert.

== Cast ==
- Patrick Swayze as Nomad
- Lisa Niemi as Kasha
- Anthony Zerbe as Damnil
- Brion James as Tark
- Christopher Neame as Sho
- John Fujioka as Cord
- Brett Hool as Jux
- Marcel Van Heerden as Lann
- Arnold Vosloo as Makker

== Production ==
Principal photography took place in Dead Vlei, Namib-Naukluft Park, Namibia.

== Reception ==
Steel Dawn premiered on 290 screens on November 8, 1987, in the United States. It grossed $311,892 on its opening weekend. It reportedly made approximately $562,187 against an estimated $3,500,000 budget.

On Metacritic the film has a weighted average score of 24 out of 100, based on 4 critics, indicating "generally unfavorable reviews".

Walter Goodman of The New York Times noted that the film closely follows the plot of the classic 1953 western Shane.

In a retrospective review from Film.com, Eric D. Snider wrote, "[Steel Dawn] has a very simple plot, so the only way to stretch the material into 90 minutes is to spend some time with the characters and watch them inhabit their strange, futuristic world. But the movie also has very simple characters who are devoid of personality and are not fun to spend time with, and the movie has also refused to set up their strange, futuristic world in any kind of detail."

Matt Gamble, of Where the Long Tail Ends, gave a more positive review, writing, "Steel Dawn opens with...a scene so amazing that it will melt your face right off. The problem is, the scene achieves such great heights that the rest of the film pales in comparison. Which is a shame, as Steel Dawn is a damn solid, if a bit predictable, movie."

It holds 35% rating on Rotten Tomatoes.

== See also ==
- List of American films of 1987
