= The Day of the Lord (film) =

2020 Spanish film

- Film poster
- Spanish: Menendez Parte 1: El día del Señor
- Directed by: Santiago Alvarado Ilarri
- Written by: Santiago Alvarado Ilarri; Ramón Salas
- Starring: Dolores Heredia; Ximena Romo; JuliNiru
- Production companies: Invico Capital; Magno Entertainment; Minds Eye Entertainment
- Distributed by: Netflix
- Release date: October 30, 2020
- Running time: 93 minutes
- Countries: Mexico; Spain
- Language: Spanish

The Day of the Lord (Spanish: Menendez Parte 1: El día del Señor) is a 2020 Mexican-Spanish horror film directed by Santiago Alvarado Ilarri, written by Santiago Alvarado Ilarri and Ramón Salas and starring Dolores Heredia, Ximena Romo and Juli Fàbregas.

== Plot ==
A former Catholic priest named Menéndez is released from prison and placed into a new home. He went to prison after a failed exorcism resulted in the death of a boy. Menéndez is haunted by his failure and often has dreams of the boy, as well as his mother Marisa, whom Menéndez has feelings for. His guilt and wavering faith are further tested by Marisa's frequent visits. She does not blame him for her son's death, and cleans his house for him. A friend he met in prison, Sebas, stops by and asks for his help since he believes his daughter Raquel may be possessed. Menéndez is reluctant to get involved, but eventually agrees to meet with Raquel. Adamant that his daughter is possessed by a demon, Sebas leaves Raquel in the priest's care. A rebellious young woman, Raquel denies that she is possessed, yet seems to enjoy taunting and teasing the older man. Menéndez, on the other hand, seems to waver back & forth between enjoying her behavior, or being disgusted by it. Throughout these events, the priest often talks on the phone with an unnamed caller, speaking to the caller as if they are God.

Once he decides that the girl is indeed possessed, Menéndez has Sebas join him as they attempt to exorcise the demon. Using questionable methods which involve torturing Raquel, the two men attempt to force the demon to reveal itself. When it does not, Sebas can take no more and embraces his daughter, apologizing for the exorcism. At that moment, the demon reveals itself, easily overpowering the two men and tying them up before forcing herself on a distraught Sebas. Menéndez escapes while this is going on, and the two are able to tie Raquel up again. Continuing the exorcism with renewed vigor, the men manage to expel the demon into its physical form, and Menéndez realizes that it is the same one that possessed Marisa's son. He overcomes the creature with a makeshift cross, causing it to flee. A grateful Sebas and Raquel leave, and the bloodied Menéndez reports his success to the unknown caller. However, the phone is shown to be unplugged, and in the distance a nun-like figure floats across the room towards a smiling Menéndez.

== Cast ==
- Dolores Heredia as Marisa
- Ximena Romo as Raquel
- Juli Fàbregas as Menéndez
- Hector Illanes as Sebastián
- Oscar Gordillo as Demonio
