= Los artistas: primeros trazos =

Mexican comedy-drama television series

- Genre: Comedy drama
- Created by: María Dueñas
- Written by: María Dueñas; Germán Aparicio
- Starring: Maxi Iglesias; Ximena Romo
- Composer: Pablo García Lozano
- Country of origin: Mexico
- Original language: Spanish
- No. of seasons: 1
- No. of episodes: 10

Production
- Executive producers: María Dueñas; Victor García; Manuel Sanabria; Bárbara Vayá; Daniel Gutman; Adrián Santucho; Leo Lavazza; Lola Moreno; Vincenzo Gratteri; Carla Gómez
- Producers: Sydney Borjas; Ignacio Díaz
- Production companies: 360 Powwow; Isla Audiovisual

Original release
- Network: Vix
- Release: 7 July 2023

Los artistas: primeros trazos is a Mexican comedy drama streaming television series created by María Dueñas. The series is produced by 360 Powwow and Isla Audiovisual. The series stars Maxi Iglesias and Ximena Romo. It premiered on Vix on 7 July 2023.

== Premise ==
Yago (Maxi Iglesias), an antique dealer, and Cata (Ximena Romo), an art expert, decide to take advantage of their skills and knowledge to swindle millionaires by selling them false works of art, in order to get out of their difficult circumstances.

== Cast ==
- Maxi Iglesias as Yago
- Ximena Romo as Cata
- Francesc Garrido Olazábal
- Regina Pavón as Vero
- Ana María Vidal as Lela
- Manolo Caro as Lucio
- Lucía De la Fuente as Sheila Vanessa
- Sandra Guzmán as Bélgica
- Miguel Herrera as Alejandro
- David Lorente as Francisco
- Fran Berenguer as Santos
- Carlos Santos as Padrón
- Abel Folk as Juan Pedro
- Ciro Miró as Molina
- Laura Ramos as Marta Margarita
- María José Goyanes as Loles
- Nati Ortiz de Zárate as Cuca

== Production ==
On 16 February 2022, the series was announced as one of the titles for TelevisaUnivision's streaming platform Vix+. On 8 September 2022, Maxi Iglesias and Ximena Romo were announced in the lead roles, with filming beginning in Madrid, Spain a few days later. Filming also took place in Toledo, Marbella and Miami. Filming concluded in January 2023. On 15 February 2023, Vix released the first teaser for the series. The series premiered on 7 July 2023.

== Episodes ==
No.	Title	Directed by	Original release date
1	"Dos destinos"	Joaquín Llamas	7 July 2023
2	"Plan en marcha"	Joaquín Llamas	7 July 2023
3	"Rehaciendo planes"	Joaquín Llamas	7 July 2023
4	"Cambios inesperados"	Oriol Ferrer	7 July 2023
5	"Ojo por ojo"	Oriol Ferrer	7 July 2023
6	"Tregua"	Oriol Ferrer	7 July 2023
7	"Caminos separados"	Manuel Sanabria	7 July 2023
8	"Tras la pista"	Manuel Sanabria	7 July 2023
9	"Vidas en caos"	Manuel Sanabria	7 July 2023
10	"Último plan"	Joaquín Llamas	7 July 2023

== Awards and nominations ==
Year	Award	Category	Nominated	Result	Ref
2024	Produ Awards	Best Comedy Drama Series	Los artistas: primeros trazos	Nominated	
2024	Produ Awards	Best Lead Actress - Comedy Drama Series and Miniseries	Ximena Romo	Nominated	
2024	Produ Awards	Best Lead Actor - Comedy Drama Series and Miniseries	Maxi Iglesias	Nominated	
2024	Produ Awards	Best Directing - Comedy/Comedy Drama Series and Miniseries	Joaquín Llamas, Oriol Ferrer & Manuel Sanabria	Nominated	
2024	Produ Awards	Best Showrunner - Comedy/Comedy Drama Series and Miniseries	María Dueñas	Nominated	
2024	Produ Awards	Best Screenplay - Comedy/Comedy Drama Series and Miniseries	María Dueñas	Nominated	
