= Como si fuera la primera vez =

2019 Mexican comedy film

- Film poster
- Directed by: Mauricio T. Valle
- Written by: George Wing
- Based on: 50 First Dates by George Wing
- Starring: Vadhir Derbez; Ximena Romo; Francisco Rueda; Alejandro Camacho
- Music by: Franco Medina-Mora
- Production companies: Lantica Media; Le Petit Soldat Cinema; Sony Pictures International Productions
- Distributed by: Sony Pictures Releasing International
- Release dates: 30 January 2019 (Festival de Cine Global Dominicano); 30 August 2019 (Mexico)
- Running time: 109 minutes
- Country: Mexico
- Language: Spanish

Como si fuera la primera vez (lit. 'Like it was the first time') is a 2019 Mexican comedy film directed by Mauricio T. Valle. It is a remake of the 2004 film 50 First Dates, directed by Peter Segal, and starring Adam Sandler, and Drew Barrymore. The remake stars Vadhir Derbez, and Ximena Romo as the main protagonists of the story. The film, like the original version, retained its title translated into Spanish in Latin America. The film premiered on 30 August 2019 in Mexico.

== Cast ==
- Vadhir Derbez as Diego
- Ximena Romo as Luci
- Francisco Rueda
- Alejandro Camacho
