= Missing in Action 2: The Beginning =

1985 film directed by Lance Hool

- Theatrical release poster
- Directed by: Lance Hool
- Written by: Arthur Silver; Larry Levinson; Steve Bing
- Produced by: Menahem Golan; Yoram Globus
- Starring: Chuck Norris; Soon-Tek Oh; Steven Williams; Bennett Ohta; Cosie Costa; Joe Michael Terry
- Cinematography: Jorge Stahl Jr.
- Edited by: Mark Conte; Marcus Manton
- Music by: Brian May
- Production company: Cannon Films
- Distributed by: Metro-Goldwyn-Mayer
- Release date: March 1, 1985
- Running time: 95 minutes
- Country: United States
- Language: English
- Budget: $2,410,000
- Box office: $10,755,447

Missing in Action 2: The Beginning is a 1985 American action adventure film, and a prequel to Missing in Action, both of which star Chuck Norris. It was directed by Lance Hool, and written by Steve Bing, Larry Levinson and Arthur Silver. It is the second installment in the Missing in Action film series.

Missing in Action 2: The Beginning was filmed back to back with the original Missing in Action and was originally intended to be the first film of the two. But according to Joseph Zito, director of what was to become Missing in Action, it was decided that the sequel was a much better film and would be a more successful first film. Consequently, Cannon just switched titles and release dates so that the planned sequel was released first, and the planned first film was released as a prequel. It was followed by another sequel, Braddock: Missing in Action III, featuring the same character, but with a stand-alone screenplay.

== Plot ==
Ten years before freeing the US POWs from a brutal general, Colonel James Braddock was held in a North Vietnamese POW camp run by sadistic Colonel Yin who forces the POWs to grow opium for a French drug runner named François, and tries to get Braddock to admit to and sign a long list of war crimes. One of his fellow soldiers Captain David Nester has been convinced (likely by Yin) that their country has abandoned them and has become one of Yin's henchmen for which his fellow soldiers denounce him as a traitor. During his team's time in captivity, they are relentlessly subjected to various forms of humiliating torture, such as Sergeant Opelka having an unloaded pistol fired into his head, Yin forcing Braddock and Nester to have a fist fight and Braddock being hung by his feet and having a bag with a rat inside it placed over his head and Braddock being told that his wife has left him and remarried.

Franklin, another US POW, starts to suffer from malaria, and Braddock exchanges an admission of guilt to Yin's charges of war crimes for medicine for the infected soldier. Yin breaks his deal with Braddock, and gives the soldier an overdose of opium and later burns him to death in front of Braddock. Enraged, Braddock escapes from the camp, plots to free his fellow prisoners and destroy the prison camp. Yin then betrays François, taking his helicopter to search for Braddock and also takes control of his drug ring.

Braddock inflicts several losses against Yin's men, leading to Yin's second-in-command to dress a Vietnamese soldier as Colonel Yin, shoot him and take another POW named Anthony Mazilli hostage in an attempt to lure Braddock into the open. Braddock notices that the decoy is not wearing Yin's boots, and proceeds to kill Yin's men while Nester sacrifices himself in a gunfight to allow Mazilli to escape. Eventually, Braddock fights Yin hand to hand in Yin's quarters. Subduing Yin, Braddock escorts the prisoners to an awaiting helicopter although not before igniting explosive charges planted around Yin's quarters.

== Cast ==
- Chuck Norris as Colonel James Thomas Braddock
- Soon-Tek Oh as Colonel Yin
- Steven Williams as Captain David Nester
- Bennett Ohta as Captain Ho
- Cosie Costa as Lieutenant Anthony Mazilli
- Joe Michael Terry as Corporal Lawrence Opelka
- Christopher Cary as Emerson
- John Wesley as Master Sergeant Ernest Franklin
- David Chung as Dou Chou
- Professor Toru Tanaka as Lao
- Dean Raphael Ferrandini as Harry Kirtle
- Pierre Issot as Francois
- Mischa Hausserman as Kelly
- Randon Lo as Hooker #1
- Michiyo Tanaka as Hooker #2
- Andrea Lowe as Hooker #3
- Sergio Kato as Stunt Double

== Production ==
=== Development ===
Norris was approached to make the film by Lance Hool, who had a script about American POWs in Vietnam. Norris was enthusiastic because he wanted to pay tribute to his brother Wieland. Vietnam films were not popular at the time, and Norris and Hool received numerous rejections.

Hool and Norris took the project to Cannon Films, who liked the project. They already had a script in development about the rescue of American POWS in Vietnam, and signed Norris to make both movies. The first, Missing in Action, would be about Braddock's rescue of POWS. The second, Missing in Action 2, would be a prequel about Braddock's years as a POW. The two films were shot back to back. Joseph Zito directed the first, and Hool the second.

=== Filming ===
Filming was to have started in Saint Kitts in January 1984, but the films ended up being shot in the Philippines.

Norris had to shoot a scene in which his character was being tortured by having his head stuck in a sack with a provoked rat: "It was during my young and foolish stage, so when it turned out there was no fake rat, I said, 'Kill a real one'. They hung me upside down, put the sack over my head, I got the rat in my mouth and there's fake blood coming down the rope into my mouth. All I can taste is mountain rat and I'm thinking, 'I'm gonna get the bubonic plague'".

== Reception ==
=== Box office ===
The film opened at #3, grossing $3,868,515 in the opening weekend. It was released in 1,336 theaters for a $2,895 average. The opening week takings accounted for 36% of its total gross. The total US market revenue is $10,755,447.

=== Critical response ===
Janet Maslin of The New York Times wrote that "the new film, like its predecessor, is primitive but shrewd". Variety said: "This prequel to last winter's box-office burst from Cannon is neither as well produced as the original Missing in Action nor does it have the muscle to do the same kind of business". Michael Wilmington of the Los Angeles Times wrote: "The whole movie is suffused with that curious blend of viciousness and sentimentality that often marks American adventure movies (even the great ones). What's missing is any sense of responsibility: toward history, toward Vietnam's actual combatants or even to the movie's fictional characters. They all simply become cheap fodder in a cheap revenge saga, a fantasy whose sole obsession is to 'win', and rub the enemy's nose in the blood and gore of that victory". Gene Siskel and Roger Ebert included it in a special 1985 episode of their TV show where the critics covered four sequels that they both disliked; however, Ebert gave the film tepid praise by stating it was better than the other 3 films they covered (including the 2nd Police Academy and 3rd Porky's films), and Siskel saying that the film wasn't that good but made him feel sad and thoughtful because it came across as an attempt to provide a fictional victory in the Vietnam War, "the war America lost in real life".

== See also ==
- List of American films of 1985
- Chuck Norris filmography

== Notes ==
- Norris, Chuck; Hyams, Joe (1988). The secret of inner strength: my story. Little, Brown. ISBN 9780316611916.
