= Wolf Lake (film) =

1978 film by Burt Kennedy

- Theatrical poster
- Directed by: Burt Kennedy
- Written by: Burt Kennedy
- Produced by: Lance Hool
- Starring: Rod Steiger
- Cinematography: Carlos Montaño; Álex Phillips Jr.
- Edited by: Warner E. Leighton
- Music by: Ken Thorne
- Production company: Melvin Simon Productions
- Distributed by: Filmcorp Distribution
- Release date: October 16, 1981
- Running time: 88 minutes
- Country: United States
- Language: English

Wolf Lake is a 1981 thriller film directed by Burt Kennedy and starring Rod Steiger and Robin Mattson.

== Plot ==
A group of men travel to a duck hunt in the Northwest. One of them, Charlie, is hoping to travel and forget the grief he has over his son's death in Vietnam. When he learns that David, the young caretaker of the lakehouse they are staying at, is a deserter, Charlie goes berserk and hunts David and his fiancé

== Cast ==
- Rod Steiger as Charlie
- David Huffman as David
- Robin Mattson as Linda
- Jerry Hardin as Wilbur
- Richard Herd as George
- Paul Mantee as Sweeney

== Production ==
The film was an early production for Melvin Simon Productions made in 1977. Although set in Canada, the film was made in Chihuahua in Mexico.

== Release ==
The film received a test release on October 16, 1981, under the name The Honor Guard in Colorado Springs, Las Vegas and Pueblo, Colorado with a limited theatrical release in the United States in 1982.
