= One Last Dance (2003 film) =

- Theatrical poster
- Directed by: Lisa Niemi
- Screenplay by: Lisa Niemi
- Produced by: Lisa Niemi; Rhonda Baker; Patrick Swayze
- Starring: Patrick Swayze; Lisa Niemi; George de la Peña
- Cinematography: Albert J. Dunk
- Edited by: Claudia Finkle
- Music by: Stacy Widelitz
- Production company: Minds Eye Entertainment
- Distributed by: Eagle Pictures
- Release date: April 4, 2003
- Running time: 101 minutes
- Countries: United States; Canada
- Language: English

One Last Dance is a 2003 American-Canadian romantic drama film, about three dancers in New York City. The film was directed and written by Lisa Niemi, wife of actor Patrick Swayze. One Last Dance starred both Swayze and Niemi, who also jointly produced, alongside George de la Peña in a major role. It was filmed in Winnipeg, Canada.

One Last Dance was choreographed by Patsy Swayze, Niemi's mother-in-law and the mother of Patrick Swayze. Niemi, who also wrote the script in addition to directing the film, drew its content from the real-life experiences and struggles of performing artists.

== Plot ==
The story revolves around three dancers who are forced to reconcile their differences and pasts. Travis (Swayze), Chrissa (Niemi), and Max (De La Peña) were three students of master choreographer Alex McGrath (Matthew Walker), but they had a falling out many years ago over a particularly difficult piece that Alex had choreographed specifically for them. Unexpectedly, McGrath dies. This reunites the three, who agree to attempt the dance piece once more to save his company. In the process, however, they all reopen old emotional wounds that had never properly healed. Travis and Chrissa have a daughter together, Bree, who wishes to follow in her mother's footsteps of dancing and even takes any opportunity to steal her mother's Pointe shoes and dance around the house in them, much to her mother's chagrin. It is realized that Max should be the new head of the company. Travis, Chrissa and Max each want to quit for good at some point. But finally all grudgingly follow through and come full-circle as dancers.
