= 2 Hearts (film) =

2020 American film by Lance Hool

- Theatrical release poster
- Directed by: Lance Hool
- Screenplay by: Veronica Hool; Robin U. Russin
- Produced by: Conrad Hool; Lance Hool
- Starring: Jacob Elordi; Adan Canto; Tiera Skovbye; Radha Mitchell
- Cinematography: Vincent De Paula
- Edited by: Craig Herring
- Music by: James Jandrisch
- Production company: Silver Lion Films
- Distributed by: Freestyle Releasing
- Release date: October 16, 2020
- Running time: 100 minutes
- Country: United States
- Language: English
- Budget: $15 million
- Box office: $1.3 million

2 Hearts is a 2020 American romantic drama film directed and co-produced by Lance Hool and starring Jacob Elordi, Adan Canto, Tiera Skovbye and Radha Mitchell. It marks Hool's first directorial credit since 1999. It is based on the true story of Leslie and Jorge Bacardi and Christopher Gregory.

The film was theatrically released in the United States by Freestyle Releasing on October 16, 2020, receiving generally negative reviews from critics.

== Plot ==
In the early 2010s, Chris, one of the two main characters, is shown standing on a beach watching a yacht, when suddenly we fast forward and see him being wheeled into an operating room. Rewinding to the 1950s, to the story of Jorge, a child playing soccer falls unconscious and then undergoes an operation on his lungs. The doctor tells his parents that he will probably not live to the age of 20 and should not overexert himself.

At college in 2010, Chris bumps into Samantha (Sam) twice and starts helping her with her "safety buddies" program. A now 30-year-old Jorge meets Leslie, a flight attendant on his flight. He is the son of the Cuban owner of the rum brand Bolivar. While spending time with Jorge in Hawaii, Leslie asks him about his cough and scar and he tells her about his condition off-screen. Jorge later proposes to Leslie.

In 2011, Chris, before taking his driving test, fills out a form at the DMV indicating his willingness to be an organ donor. He tells Sam that she must go on a date with him if he passes the test, so they have their first date that night. Sam meets Chris' family during Easter break. Jorge and Leslie get married, without his parents, who disapprove of their son marrying an American woman.

While hanging out with Sam and his two best friends in the dorm, Chris suddenly falls and loses consciousness, and he is next being wheeled into the operating room as in the opening scene. Later, a doctor comes into his room, where Sam and Chris' parents and brother are present.

When Chris wakes up, he tells Sam he wants to ask her something and we then see their wedding. At this point, Chris, the narrator, mentions that years earlier Jorge and Leslie lived a life similar to that of him and Sam but that there were some painful differences.

Leslie is shown crying next to a baby crib while Sam is shown to be pregnant. A doctor tells Jorge and Leslie that they cannot have children. Chris and Sam go to Lamaze classes together, while Jorge's cough gets worse. Jorge is shown with an oxygen tank, while Chris and Sam are shown with their baby. A doctor tells Jorge and Leslie that a matching lung has been found, so he is wheeled into surgery.

Chris is promoted to lieutenant firefighter and arrives home to share the news with Sam and their son. As the narrator, he says that this is not what actually happened, and the film returns to him being wheeled into the operating room.

After running numerous tests, the doctor informs Sam and Chris' family that he has had an aneurysm, but is expected to be fine, as his condition is usually not fatal. However, the next morning, the doctor informs Sam and Chris' family that his condition has worsened severely and he is braindead.

The hospital has found suitable recipients in need of heart, lungs, liver, pancreas, kidneys and eyes, which Chris can donate. The receivers of the organs are shown getting their phone calls. Chris' family is met by his friends who are holding a candlelight vigil in front of the hospital.

Jorge comes to after the transplant and asks, "Who is in here breathing for me?" Leslie answers, "An angel, that is all we know." Chris' funeral is then shown. Jorge insists on knowing who his donor was, so he sends a letter of gratitude. Chris' parents send a response, then they and Sam meet with Jorge and Leslie.

In the final scene, Chris is shown watching the yacht as in the opening scene, and it is revealed the yacht he was watching was Jorge and Leslie's, with Sam and his parents on it.

== Cast ==
- Jacob Elordi as Christopher "Chris" Gregory
- Adan Canto as Jorge Bolivar
- Tiera Skovbye as Samantha "Sam" Peters
- Tahmoh Penikett as Eric
- Kari Matchett as Grace
- Radha Mitchell as Leslie Bolivar
- Jordan Burtchett as Colin
- Anthony Konechny as John

== Release ==
Freestyle Releasing acquired distribution rights to the film in June 2020. The film was originally scheduled to be released on September 11, 2020, but due to the COVID-19 pandemic was pushed to October 16, 2020.

== Reception ==
=== Box office ===
In its opening weekend, 2 Hearts grossed $565,000 from 1,683 theaters. It then made $313,010 in its second weekend.

=== Critical response ===
On review aggregator Rotten Tomatoes, the film has an approval rating of 17% based on 29 reviews, with an average rating of 4.4/10. The website's critics consensus reads: "Its picturesque setting is as agreeable as its noble intentions, but this treacly melodrama proves 2 Hearts aren't necessarily better than one". On Metacritic, it has a weighted average score of 29 out of 100, based on six critics, indicating "generally unfavorable" reviews. Audiences polled by CinemaScore gave the film an average grade of "B" on an A+ to F scale.
