= María Antonietta Berriozábal =

American activist (born 1941)

María Antonietta Berriozábal (née Rodriguez Arredondo; born 1941) is an American activist and author living in San Antonio, Texas.

In 1981, Berriozábal became the first Hispanic woman to serve on the city council of San Antonio, where she served District One for ten years. She became a local activist for the Chicano movement aligning with members of the Raza Unida Party such as Rosie Castro.

== Early life and education ==
Berriozábal's grandparents moved to Laredo, Texas, from Mexico during the Mexican Revolution of 1910. The family moved to San Antonio in 1942. She attended Christ the King Private School and later graduated from Providence High School. After high school she worked with The Salvation Army while taking college courses at night at the University of Texas at San Antonio. She graduated in 1979 with a bachelor's degree, which took her 20 years to complete.

== Career ==
Berriozábal worked with The Salvation Army for seven years before moving into politics. She worked for John A. Daniels (chair of the Democratic Party in Bexar County) as a legal secretary for Hemisphere '68. Her duties included assisting in composing contracts between and foreign, national, and state governments, as well as concessionaires and exhibitors, while also translating documents arriving from Mexico and Argentina from Spanish to English.

After John Daniels was ousted from the Democratic Party, Berriozábal became Hubert Humphrey's campaign manager in Bexar County. After Humphrey's loss, she worked for seven years as Judge Blair Reeves’ executive secretary at the county courthouse. She interned with Councilman Henry Cisneros and obtained a job with the San Antonio Census Bureau in 1980.

After assisting Cisneros with his campaign to become mayor of San Antonio, Berriozábal sought to fill the vacant seat of District 1 councilperson. After campaigning with the assistance of John Garcia, John Alvarado, Sylvia Rodriguez, and Luz Escamilla, Berriozábal won the position for District 1 with 55% of the vote. She served on the city council for ten years.

Berriozábal’s public service includes appointments as the U.S. representative to the Inter-American Commission on Women, an agency within the Organization of American States, and as a delegate to the UN's Fourth World Conference in Beijing, China.

== Later life ==
In 1993, Berriozábal was honored with the Benetia Humanitarian award for her efforts within the community such as organizing the Sisters of Charity, serving as the Visitation House's president of the board, and creating the Hispanas Unidas organization located at Our Lady of the Lake University. She helped found the Santuario Sisterfarm to promote “…a holistic understanding of justice, which embraces social justice principles, cultural diversity, and biodiversity.”.

She continued to advocates for human rights, cultural diversity, and economic justice in the city of San Antonio, including protesting for nine hours, alongside fifteen students, outside the office of Senator Kay Bailey Hutchison for her support on the DREAM Act in 2010.

In 2012, she published her autobiography, Maria, Daughter of Immigrants.

== Personal life ==
Maria and Manuel Berriozábal married in 1975 and moved to New Orleans where Manuel taught at Tulane University. After nine months there, the couple moved back to San Antonio where Manuel taught mathematics at the University of Texas at San Antonio and Maria obtained her political science degree from the same university.

== See also ==
Sisterfarm
