= Dolores Heredia =

Mexican actress (born 1966)

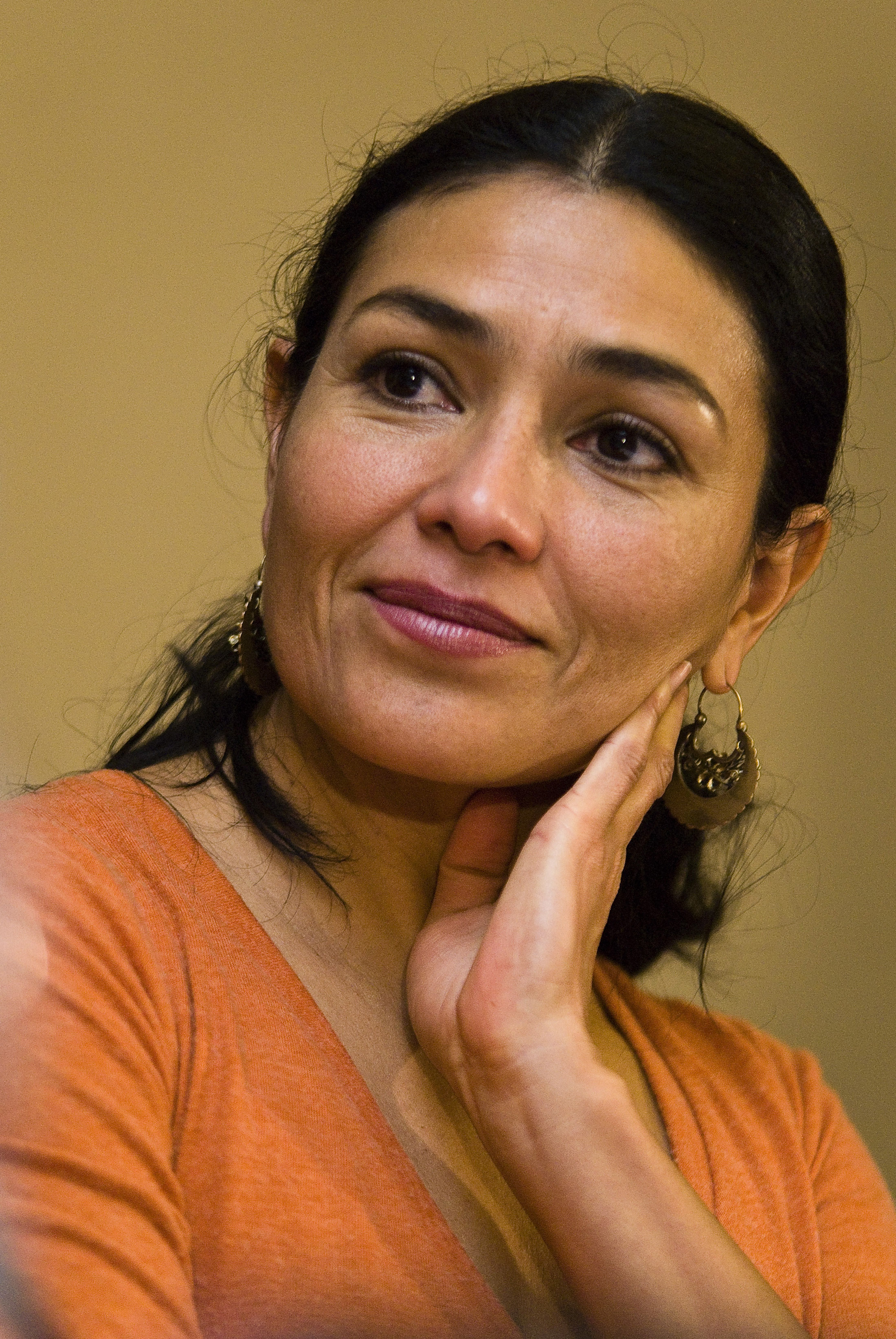
- Heredia in 2010
- Born: Dolores Heredia Lerma; October 6, 1966 (age 59); La Paz, Baja California Sur, Mexico
- Education: National Autonomous University of Mexico
- Occupation: Actress
- Years active: 1990–present

Dolores Heredia Lerma (Spanish: [doˈloɾes eˈɾeðia ˈleɾma]; born October 6, 1966) is a Mexican actress.

== Personal life ==
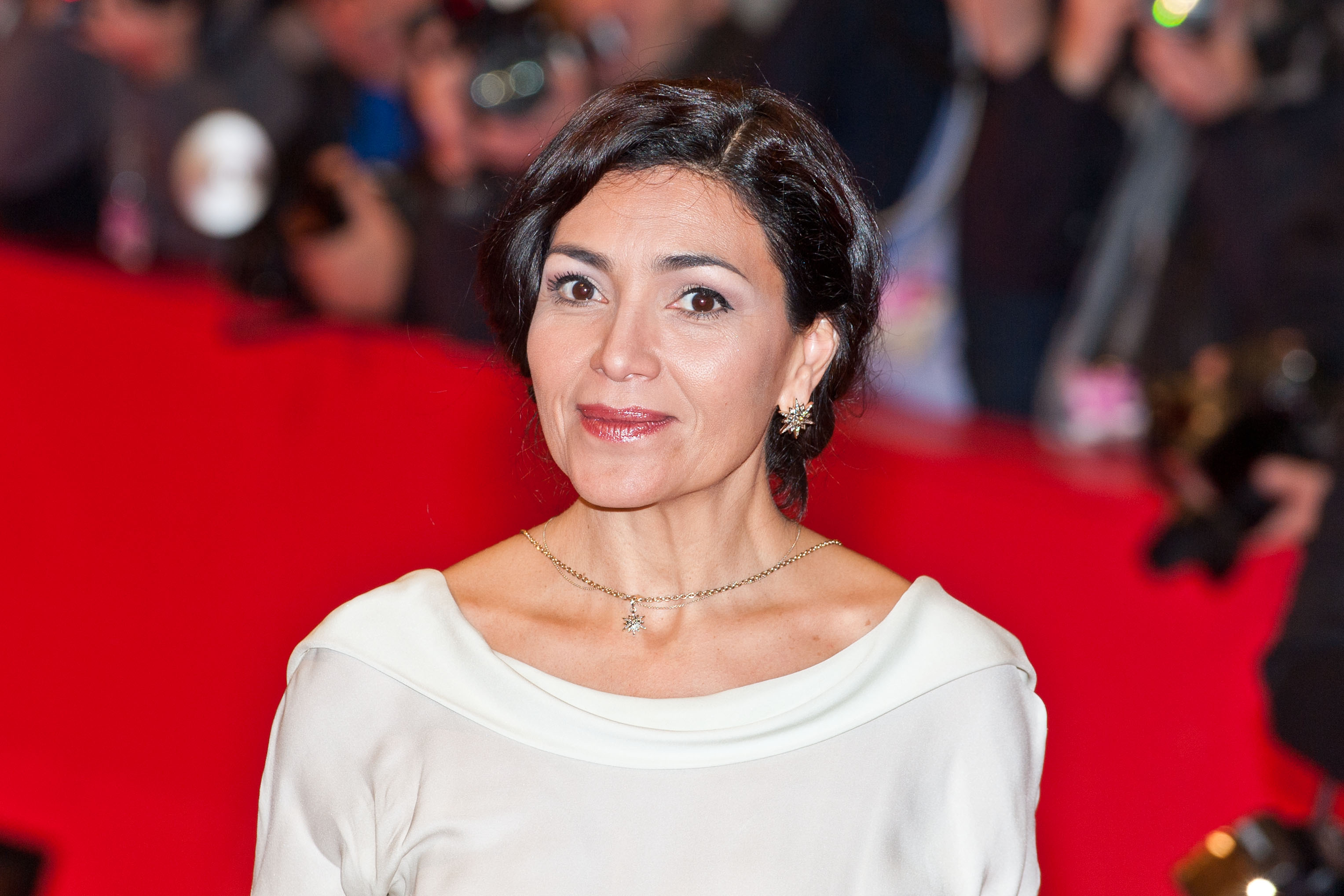
Heredia at the premiere of Two Men in Town (2014)

She is the seventh of ten children who grew up in La Paz, Baja California Sur. Her mother was a photographer from Sinaloa, Lusiana Kornal and her father was a seaman from Guanajuato. She studied drama at the National Autonomous University of Mexico.

== Filmography ==
=== Movies ===
- La otra orilla (1990)
- Pueblo de madera (1990)
- Un cielo cruel y una tierra colorada (1991)
- Sombra de ángel (1991)
- El patrullero (1991)
- De barro (1992)
- Decisiones (1993)
- Pueblo viejo (1993)
- Vagabunda (1994)
- La hija del Puma (1994)
- Un hilito de sangre (1995)
- Un pedazo de noche (1995)
- Desiertos mares (1995)
- Dos crímenes (1995)
- En el aire (1995)
- Santitos (1999)
- De la calle (2001)
- Ciudades oscuras (2002)
- Suertuda gloria (2003)
- La mudanza (2003)
- La historia del baúl rosado (2005)
- Sexo, amor y otras perversiones 2 (2006)
- Fuera del cielo (2006) - Sara
- Mujer alabastrina (2006)
- La mirada del adiós (2006)
- Cobrador: In God We Trust (2006)
- Al final del día (2007)
- Tr3s (2007)
- Vantage Point (2008)
- El viaje de Teo (2008)
- Enemigos íntimos (2008)
- Conozca la cabeza de Juan Pérez (2008)
- Purgatorio (2008/I)
- Rudo y Cursi (2008) - Elvira
- The Desert Within (2008) - Maria Dolores
- El horno (2009)
- Rock Marí (2009)
- Días de gracia (2010)
- 180° (2010)
- A Better Life (2011) - Anita
- Get the Gringo (2012)- Kid's Mom
- El Santos vs. La Tetona Mendoza (2012)
- How i Spent my Summer Vacation (2012)
- Bless Me, Ultima (2013) - Maria
- Eddie Reynolds y los ángeles de acero (2014) - Teresa
- Two Men in Town (2014) - Teresa Flores
- Sonora (2018) - Doña Rosario
- Chicuarotes (2019) - Tonchi
- The Day of the Lord (2020) - Marisa
- Northern Skies Over Empty Space (2022) - Sofía
- Pedro Páramo (2024)

=== Television ===
- The Wrong Man (1993) - Rosita
- Gitanas (2004) - Jovanka
- Mujeres (2005)
- Marina (2006) - Rosa
- Capadocia (2008) - Teresa Lagos
- Deseo prohibido (2008)
- La ruta blanca (2012)
- Sense8 (2016)
- Diablero (2018) - Mamá Chabela

== Accolades ==
- Ariel Award, nomination, "Dos crímenes", 1995
- Amiens International Film Festival, Best Actress, "Santitos", 1999
- Ariel Award, nomination, "Santitos", 1999
- Cartagena Film Festival, Best Actress, "Santitos", 1999
- Guadalajara Mexican Film Festival, Best Actress, "Conozca la cabeza de Juan Pérez", 2008
