= Ximena Romo =

Mexican actress

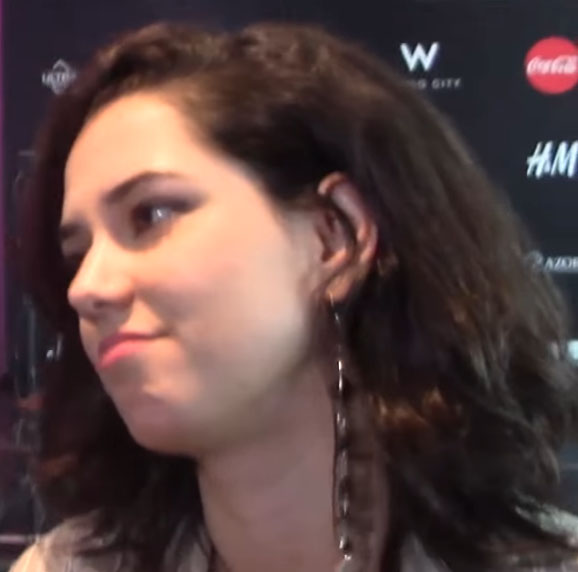
- Born: Ximena Romo Mercado; April 14, 1990 (age 36); Mexico City, Mexico
- Occupations: Actress; model

Ximena Romo Mercado (born April 14, 1990) is a Mexican actress and model best known for her role as Nora Gaxiola in the Televisa telenovela El color de la pasión. Romo is the daughter of Mexican politician Patricia Mercado and former head of the Mexican electricians' union, Horacio Romo Vázquez.

== Career ==
Ximena Romo Mercado trained as an actress at the Casazul Artes Escénicas Argos in Mexico and then received an MA in contemporary acting from the Royal Central School of Speech and Drama of the University of London. She made her film debut in 2008 in the movie by Gerardo Naranjo, I'm Gonna Explode, a drama in which she played the role of Lucía. Later, she appeared as Maria in Oveja negra (2009), directed by Humberto Hinojosa Ozcáriz. Her next film was Amaneceres oxidados (2010), directed by Diego Cohen, in which she worked alongside actors such as Armando Hernández, Catalina López, Ari Brickman, and Alan Chávez. She was also a co-producer of the short film El retrete de Elena (2010). She then appeared in the series Soy tu fan, starring Ana Claudia Talancón, in which Romo played as Mila.

== Filmography ==
=== Film roles ===
Year	Title	Roles	Notes
2008	I'm Gonna Explode	Lucía	
2009	Oveja negra	María	
2010	Amaneceres oxidados	Andrea	
2013	Ficción	Girlfriend	Short film
2014	Gloria	Aline	
2016	Tales of an Immoral Couple	Martina 17 Years old	
2017	Everybody Loves Somebody	Lily Álvarez	
2017	Fiebre	Romina	Short film
2018	Dibujando el cielo	María	
2018	Preludio a una Siesta	Ximena	
2019	This Is Not Berlin	Rita	Nominated – Ariel Award for Best Supporting Actress
2019	Como si fuera la primera vez	Luci	
2019	Mentada de padre	Rosa	
2020	Sin Hijos	Mabel	
2020	The Day of the Lord	Raquel	
2020	Dime Cuando Tú	Danielle	
2021	Sexo, pudor y lágrimas 2	Katia	
2025	Looking Through Water	Julia	

=== Television roles ===
Year	Title	Roles	Notes
2011	Soy tu fan	Mila	Episode: "Back Up"
2013	Alguien más	Laura	5 episodes
2014	Dos lunas	Sole Adolescente	Episodes: "El engaño" and "Las dos lunas"
2014	El color de la pasión	Nora Gaxiola Murillo	Main role; 116 episodes
2016	Yago	Ámbar Madrigal	Supporting role; 39 episodes
2017	Las 13 esposas de Wilson Fernández	Emilia	Episode: "Emilia"
2018	Un extraño enemigo	Laura	5 episodes
2022	María Félix: La Doña	Young María Félix	Main role
2022-24	Señorita 89	Elena	
2023	Los artistas: primeros trazos	Cata Guzmán	
2026	Doc	Dr. Raquel Aguirre	Recurring role
