= Tyler Morning Telegraph =

Daily newspaper serving Tyler, Texas, USA

- Front page of February 13, 2019 issue
- Type: Daily newspaper
- Format: Broadsheet
- Owner: CMG Texas
- Founders: L.M. Green; J.P. Green
- Publisher: Justin Wilcox
- Managing editor: Santana Wood
- LCCN: sn 86089220
- Founded: 1877; 149 years ago (as the Courier)
- Relaunched: Tyler Courier-Times 1906; 120 years ago; Tyler Morning Telegraph November 14, 1929; 96 years ago
- Language: English
- Headquarters: 100 E. Ferguson; Suite 501; Tyler, TX 75702
- Country: United States
- Circulation: 8,055 (as of 2023)
- OCLC number: 14248248
- Website: tylerpaper.com

The Tyler Morning Telegraph is a daily online newspaper based in Tyler, Texas, United States. It currently prints Wednesdays, Friday, and a Saturday/Sunday weekend edition available for delivery by mail or in many locations across Smith County for sale. It is owned by CMG Texas.

== History ==
The newspaper begin publishing weekly in 1877 as the Weekly Courier. In 1882, the Daily Courier began publishing daily. In 1906, the Daily Courier and the Weekly Times consolidated into The Tyler Courier-Times. In 1910, the newspaper sold to the Butler family.

The newspaper's Sunday edition is known as the Tyler Morning Telegraph. The Tyler Courier-Times was a sister afternoon paper published until 1995.

The paper uses a white letter T over a blue circle as its logo, changing from the previous stylized paperboy. The paper bills itself as "the Tyler Paper" in advertising and elsewhere, including its URL.

On November 28, 2018, T.B. Butler Publishing announced the sale of the Tyler Morning Telegraph to media company, M. Roberts Media. New ownership went into effect on December 1, 2018, ending 108 years of ownership by the Butler family. In 2024, M. Roberts Media was acquired by Carpenter Media Group.

On September 11, 2024, the Tyler Paper became available by mail only for subscribers. It remains available at many convenient locations across East Texas to purchase.

== Controversy ==
In its Friday, January 8, 2021, edition, the newspaper incorrectly captioned an Associated Press photo of the 2021 storming of the United States Capitol with "members of antifa dressed as supporters of President Donald Trump". The newspaper issued a retraction, and published multiple follow-up articles detailing how the mistake occurred.

In April 2024, access to tylerpaper.com was banned in the EEA allegedly because of its references to Prince William and Rose Hanbury. The precise banning message was

451: Unavailable for legal reasons.
We recognize you are attempting to access this website from a country belonging to the European Economic Area (EEA) including the EU which enforces the General Data Protection Regulation (GDPR) and therefore access cannot be granted at this time.
