= George de la Peña =

American ballet dancer

George de la Peña (born December 9, 1955) is an American ballet dancer, musical theatre performer, choreographer, actor, and teacher. He was born in 1955 in New York City, New York.

Originally trained as a concert pianist, de la Peña switched to ballet while studying at the High School for the Performing Arts in New York City. He graduated from George Balanchine’s School of American Ballet. He joined American Ballet Theatre in the 1970s, rapidly rising to soloist. While at ABT, de la Peña danced in works choreographed by Mikhail Baryshnikov, Agnes de Mille, Kenneth MacMillan, and Jerome Robbins. By 1985, de la Peña and his then-wife, ballerina Rebecca Wright had both left ABT and moved to California. He and Ms. Wright can be seen in Baryshnikov's production of The Nutcracker on television and on DVD. De la Peña was married to Rebecca Wright from 1984 to 2006. They had two children. Rebecca Wright died from cancer in 2006.

De la Peña began acting when he was cast as Vaslav Nijinsky in Herbert Ross's film Nijinsky (1980), and for some time thereafter, he was typecast in Russian roles. In a 1983 interview in the New York Times, an exasperated de la Peña, who is of mixed Russian and Argentinian descent, pointed out that producers thought he was not a native English speaker. He appeared on Broadway in Woman of the Year, the revival of On Your Toes, the notorious flop The Red Shoes (Drama Desk Award nomination), and Chronicle of a Death Foretold (Drama League Award). While living in Los Angeles during the 1980s, he performed in Cats and various regional productions.

His film and television credits include Personal Best (1982), a failed 1989 TV pilot based on the film The Flamingo Kid, Kuffs (1992), Brain Donors (1992), Mighty Aphrodite (1995), One Last Dance (2003), and guest appearances on shows such as L.A. Law and Star Trek: The Next Generation. He was seen in the film The Dust Factory, with Hayden Panettiere and Armin Mueller-Stahl.

De la Peña has taught at universities, including California Institute of the Arts (CalArts), Connecticut College, and the University of Iowa, where he is the chair of the Department of Dance. He continues to teach for ABT. A director and choreographer for both theatrical works and concert dance, he assisted figure skater Debi Thomas with her routine for the Olympics. He frequently collaborates with the choreographer Martha Clarke.

George is a member of the Lincoln Center Theater Director's Laboratory.
