= Lisa Niemi =

American actress

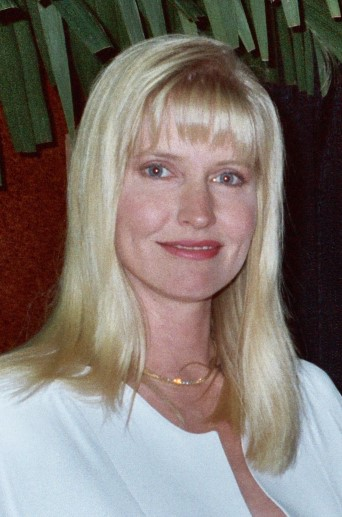
- Niemi in 1990
- Born: Lisa Anne Haapaniemi; Houston, Texas, U.S.
- Other name: Lisa Niemi Swayze
- Education: Houston Ballet Dance Company
- Occupations: Writer; dancer; choreographer; actress; director
- Years active: 1975–present
- Spouses: Patrick Swayze (m. 1975; died 2009) Albert DePrisco (m. 2014)
- Relatives: Don Swayze (brother-in-law)

Lisa Niemi Swayze (born Lisa Anne Haapaniemi ca. 1956) is an American writer, dancer, choreographer, actress, and director. She is the widow of actor and dancer Patrick Swayze.

== Early life ==
Lisa Anne Haapaniemi was born in Houston, Texas, the only daughter of six children born to the Finnish American family of Edmond Melvin Haapaniemi, a Red Cross worker, and Edna Karin Haapaniemi (née Hyttinen), a registered nurse. Niemi has said her father and her mother's professions were her inspiration and encouragement. She graduated from the Houston Ballet Dance Company in 1974. She shortened her surname from Haapaniemi (meaning in English "Aspen Cape") to Niemi ("Cape") in 1977 for her theatre stage name.

== Career ==
In the 1970s, Niemi and her husband Patrick pursued dance careers in New York City.

=== Films ===
Lisa Niemi Swayze wrote, directed and starred in the 2003 film One Last Dance alongside her husband. One Last Dance was based on Without a Word, a play written by Niemi 18 years earlier which had won six Drama Critics Awards. Niemi said, "It was basically based on our experiences as concert dancers in New York, and it affected people a lot."

She co-starred in Steel Dawn (1987) with Swayze and co-starred in Beat Angel (2004). Niemi also appeared in Letters from a Killer, Next of Kin, Younger and Younger, Live! From Death Row, She's Having a Baby and Slam Dance. Niemi directed Dance, a 1990 film.

=== Television ===
Niemi co-starred as Carla Frost in 23 episodes of the TV series Super Force from 1990 to 1991. She once again directed her husband, this time in an episode of his TV series The Beast. The episode, titled "No Turning Back", aired on April 9, 2009. It was his last performance before his death.

=== Books ===
On September 29, 2009, Niemi Swayze released a memoir, The Time of My Life, which became a New York Times Best Seller. The book was co-written by Patrick Swayze, and it was finished shortly before his death. On January 2, 2012, Niemi Swayze released another memoir, Worth Fighting For, which also became a New York Times Best Seller.

== Personal life ==
At age 14, at the Houston Ballet Dance Company, Niemi met the owner and director's son, Patrick Swayze; the two eventually got married when she was 19 years old. Niemi and Swayze married on June 12, 1975, and remained married until Swayze's death from pancreatic cancer on September 14, 2009. Shortly after they wed, the couple moved to New York City to pursue their dance careers until the late 1970s, when they relocated to Los Angeles, California. In addition to dancing and filmmaking, they ran a construction business and raised horses together. The Swayzes had no children.

In 1985, Lisa Swayze began living on a 5-acre (20,000 m^{2}) homestead near the Angeles National Forest, along with a "menagerie of dogs, prized Arabian horses and rodeo cattle". She also had a 20,000-acre (81 km^{2}) ranch in New Mexico.

She is a licensed pilot and flew Swayze to his cancer treatments prior to his death. While filming One Last Dance in Winnipeg, Manitoba, Niemi was made an honorary citizen of the city. After her husband's death, she became the Chief Ambassador of Hope for Pancreatic Cancer Action Network. In July 2011, she was made a Dame of the Royal Order of Francis I of the Two Sicilies.

On December 28, 2013, it was announced that she was engaged to Albert DePrisco, a jeweler. On May 25, 2014, the couple married.

== Bibliography ==
- Swayze, Patrick; Niemi Swayze, Lisa: The Time of My Life. Atria Books, 2010. ISBN 9781439158616
- Niemi Swayze, Lisa: Worth Fighting For: Love, Loss, and Moving Forward. Atria Books, 2012. ISBN 1439196354
