= Constanza Hool =

Constanza Hool (6 December 1925 – 20 July 2008) was a dancer, actress and choreographer. She is credited as co-founder of the famous Ballet Folklorico de Mexico (with Amalia Hernández). She was the first woman to dance in the Taj Mahal (for Prime Minister Indira Gandhi), the Parthenon and the basilica of Santa Prisca. She had a television show in Mexico for 17 years and is reported to have been awarded the Silver Goddess (Diosa de Plata), a Mexican film and television award, 14 years in a row for best choreographer.

Hool served as Artist in Residence and Director of Arts and Dance for seven years at the Universidad de las Americas, near the capital city of Puebla in the state of Puebla, Mexico. Her performance locations in Mexico included Chapultepec Castle. She also taught at the University of Illinois, the University of New Mexico and the University of California (Los Angeles, CA). She received an honorary Doctor of Arts degree from the University of Illinois, the Silver Horse award in India, the Gold Aztec award for arts in Argentina and other honors.

"Constanza Hool" is the registered Artistic Name of Constanza Kamffer Garrido de Hool. Her father was Domingo Kamffer Spada, and her mother Marion de Lagos was an actress ("Madres del Mundo," 1936, released as "Mothers of the World" in the USA) and founder of Pecime, Mexico's union of cinematographic writers. Constanza was a granddaughter of soprano Maura Garrido Alfaro of Opera Mexicana, the niece of muralist David Alfaro Siqueiros and a cousin of composer Vicente Garrido. She was married to diplomat Alan Hool from 1945 until he died in 1988.

== Actress filmography ==
Caras Nuevas
The Evil That Men Do (1984, playing Isabel, Dr. Lomelin's Wife)
Los Años Verdes (1967) pg. 98
Buenas noches, Buenos Aires (1964)

- Pablo and Carolina (1957)

== Choreographer filmography ==
El señor doctor (1965)
La edad de la violencia (1964)
... a.k.a. The Age of Violence (USA)
Cri Cri el grillito cantor (1963)
Ojos tapatios (1961)
... a.k.a. Mexican Eyes (International: English title)
El violetero (1960)
