= Patrick Swayze =

American actor (1952–2009)

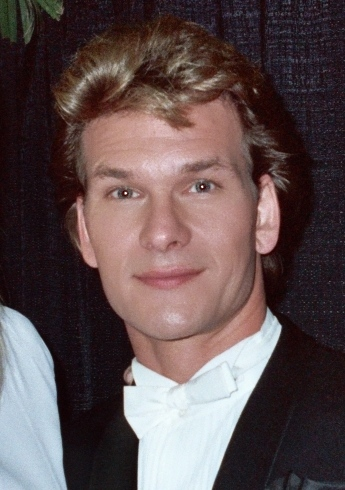
- Swayze in 1990
- Born: Patrick Wayne Swayze; August 18, 1952; Houston, Texas, U.S.
- Died: September 14, 2009 (aged 57); Los Angeles, California, U.S.
- Occupations: Actor; singer-songwriter; dancer
- Years active: 1976–2009
- Spouse: Lisa Niemi (m. 1975)
- Mother: Patsy Swayze
- Relatives: Don Swayze (brother)

Patrick Wayne Swayze (/ˈsweɪzi/ SWAY-zee; August 18, 1952 – September 14, 2009) was an American actor, singer-songwriter and dancer. Known for his romantic, tough, and comedic roles in blockbusters and cult films, Swayze was nominated for three Golden Globes and received a star on the Hollywood Walk of Fame in 1997.

Swayze received recognition for acting in the drama film The Outsiders (1983), the action film Red Dawn (1984), and the miniseries North and South (1985–1986). His breakthrough came with the romantic drama film Dirty Dancing (1987), receiving a Golden Globe nomination. He rose to further prominence in the action films Road House (1989) and Point Break (1991), and received two more Golden Globe nominations for his roles in the supernatural romance film Ghost (1990) and the road comedy film To Wong Foo, Thanks for Everything! Julie Newmar (1995). He also had a major role in the cult thriller Donnie Darko (2001).

Outside of acting, Swayze co-wrote and recorded the song "She's Like the Wind" with Stacy Widelitz for the Dirty Dancing soundtrack album, which peaked at number three on the Billboard Hot 100. He was also recognized for his public image and looks, and was named "Sexiest Man Alive" by People magazine in 1991. In 2009, Swayze died of pancreatic cancer at the age of 57.

== Early life ==
Patrick Wayne Swayze was born on August 18, 1952, in Houston, Texas, the second child of Jesse Wayne Swayze (1925–1982), an engineering draftsman, and Patsy Swayze (1927–2013), a dancer, choreographer, and dance instructor. He had an older sister, Vickie (1949–1994), two younger brothers, actor Don and Sean (1962–2025), and a younger sister, Bambi, who was adopted.

Swayze's paternal lineal ancestor was Englishman John Swasey (1619–1706) from Bridport, Dorset. During the Puritan migration to New England between 1620 and 1640, Swasey traveled aboard the Recovery and arrived in the Massachusetts Bay Colony. He married Katherine Kinge of Essex and had seven children. Their grandson Samuel, a judge, was among the first to use the Swayze spelling. Patrick's uncle, Bruce Swayze, was a professional wrestler.

Swayze grew up in the Oak Forest neighborhood of Houston and attended St. Rose of Lima Catholic School and Frank Black Middle School, later graduating from Waltrip High School and San Jacinto College Central. During this period, he pursued ice skating, classical ballet, and acting in school productions. He also played football in high school, hoping to earn a college scholarship, but a knee injury ended his prospects. He had a low Vietnam draft lottery number of 141, which was called in 1970, and he should have been drafted, but the severity of his injury may have prevented that. He also practiced martial arts, including Wushu, Taekwondo, and Aikido, which he used to channel his "self-deprecating rage."

In 1972, at age 20, he moved to New York City to complete his formal dance training at the Harkness Ballet and Joffrey Ballet schools. The American choreographer Eliot Feld planned a ballet for Swayze and Mikhail Baryshnikov, but the project was halted due to Swayze's knee reconstruction.

== Career ==
=== 1980s: Early work and breakthrough ===
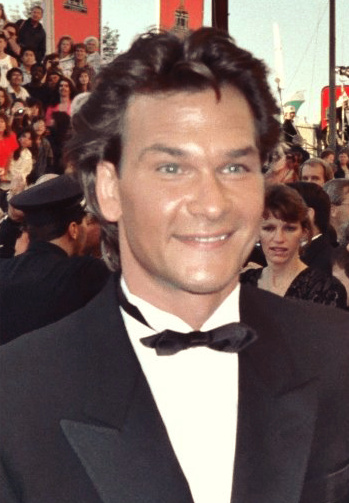
Swayze at the 61st Academy Awards in 1989

Patrick Swayze's first professional appearance was as a dancer for the Disney Theatrical Group in a show called Disney on Parade. He then starred in the role of Danny Zuko in one of the replacement casts for the long-running Broadway production of Grease. In 1979, he made his film debut as Ace in Skatetown, U.S.A. At the height of the popularity of disco, he starred in a Pabst Blue Ribbon commercial of him going on a date at a disco-themed nightclub with Pabst's then-jingle set to disco music. He appeared in the M*A*S*H episode "Blood Brothers" in 1981 as Private Sturgis, whose wounds are minor, but who is found to be terminally ill with leukemia. He appeared in the video for Rosanna by Toto as one of the gang members. That same year, he appeared in the TV movie Return of the Rebels with Barbara Eden, and then in 1983, had a brief stint on the short-lived TV series The Renegades, playing a gang leader named Bandit.

Swayze became better known to the film industry after he won the role of Darrel "Darry" Curtis in Francis Ford Coppola's 1983 cinematic adaptation of S. E. Hinton's novel, The Outsiders, and shared the screen with an ensemble cast that included Tom Cruise, Matt Dillon, Emilio Estevez, Leif Garrett, C. Thomas Howell, Diane Lane, Rob Lowe, and Ralph Macchio. In the same year, Swayze played a Marine Corps trainer in Vietnam rescue film Uncommon Valor with Gene Hackman. The following year, Swayze, Howell, and Howell's friend and fellow The Outsiders actor, Darren Dalton, reunited in Red Dawn, along with Jennifer Grey. In 1986, Lowe and Swayze reunited in Youngblood. Swayze's first major dramatic success was in the 1985 television miniseries North and South, set during the American Civil War.

Swayze starred in 1987's Dirty Dancing, a low-budget movie, planned for only a one-week release, after which it was to go to video. Swayze played resort dance instructor Johnny Castle alongside Jennifer Grey. The story enabled Swayze to dance and romance Grey and showcase his professional dance training. In addition to acting and dancing, Swayze co-composed and sang one of the songs on the soundtrack for Dirty Dancing, "She's Like the Wind." The song became a top 10 hit that has since been covered by other artists. Swayze had originally co-written the song with Stacy Widelitz for the film Grandview, U.S.A. in 1984. Dirty Dancing's coming-of-age story first became a surprise hit, and then achieved enormous international success. It was the first film to sell one million copies on video and, as of 2009, it had earned over $214 million worldwide. The film also generated several alternative, or derivative, versions, ranging from a television series to stage productions to a computer game. Swayze received a Golden Globe Award nomination for the role. After Dirty Dancing, Swayze found himself in great demand and appeared in several films, including Road House in 1989 with Sam Elliott, Ben Gazzara, and Kelly Lynch.

=== 1990s: Rise to mainstream prominence ===
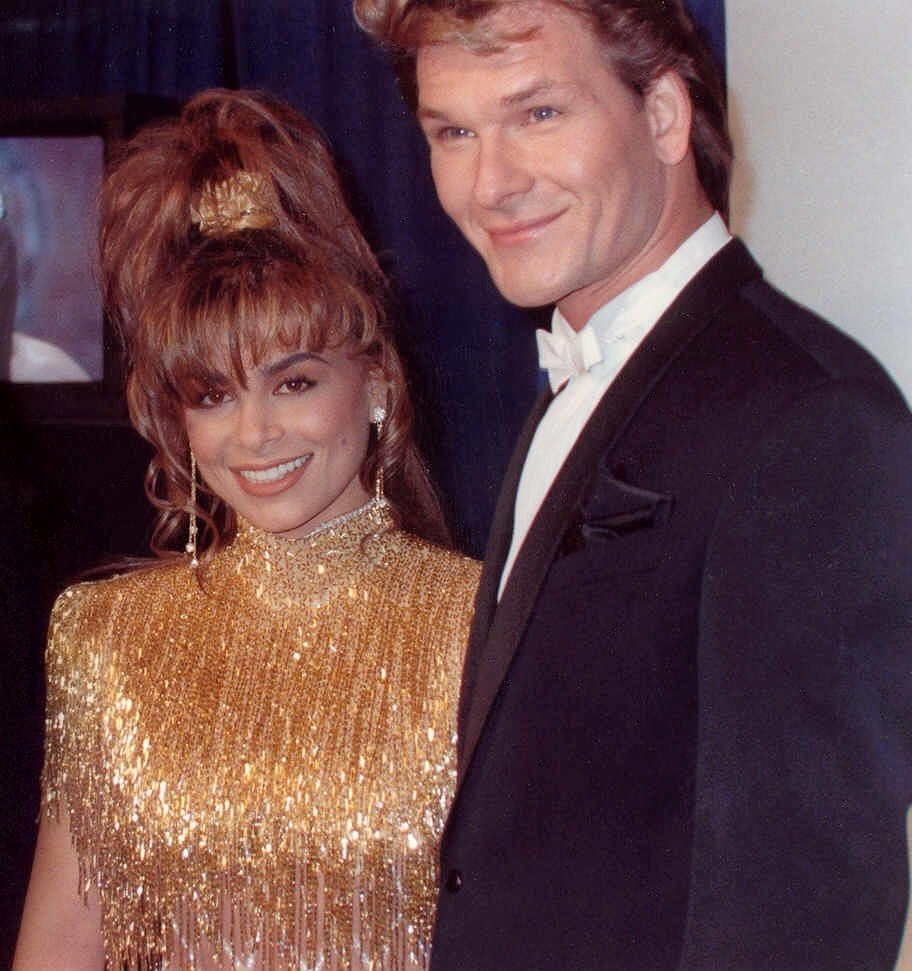
Swayze and Paula Abdul at the 1990 Grammy Awards

In the supernatural romantic thriller Ghost (1990), Swayze starred as Sam Wheat opposite Demi Moore, Whoopi Goldberg, and Tony Goldwyn. Ghost was the highest-grossing film of 1990 and the most rented videocassette of 1991. The film was nominated for the Academy Award for Best Picture and Swayze earned another Golden Globe nomination for his acting. It was also Swayze who convinced the producers to hire Goldberg, who thanked Swayze in her acceptance speech when she won the Academy Award for Best Supporting Actress. The scene where he and Moore use a pottery wheel has become an iconic moment. In the following year, he starred alongside Youngblood castmate Keanu Reeves in another major action hit, Point Break, in which he performed many of his own skydiving stunts. People magazine named him the "Sexiest Man Alive."

For his contributions to the film industry, Swayze was given a star on the Hollywood Walk of Fame in 1997. Swayze was injured in May 1997 while filming HBO's Letters from a Killer near Ione, California, when he fell from a horse and hit a tree. Both of his legs were broken, and he suffered four detached tendons in his shoulder. Filming was suspended for two months. The film aired in 1998, and Swayze slowly recovered from his injuries, but he had trouble resuming his career until 2000, when he co-starred in Forever Lulu, with Melanie Griffith.

In 1995, Swayze appeared in the movie To Wong Foo, Thanks for Everything! Julie Newmar, starring alongside Wesley Snipes and John Leguizamo as three drag queens whose car breaks down on a cross-country trip, leaving them stranded in a small town.

=== 2000s: Career expansion and later work ===
In 2001, he appeared in Donnie Darko, where he played a motivational speaker who is revealed to be a closeted pedophile. The film later obtained a cult following. After this, he co-starred with Billy Bob Thornton and Charlize Theron in Waking Up in Reno, which focuses on two redneck couples taking a road trip from Little Rock to Reno to see a monster truck rally. In 2004, he played Allan Quatermain in King Solomon's Mines and had a cameo appearance in the Dirty Dancing prequel Dirty Dancing: Havana Nights as an unnamed dance instructor.

In 2003, Swayze co-produced and also starred in the fictional dance film One Last Dance, along with his real-life wife Lisa Niemi. The story revolves around an actual dance production, Without a Word, which was choreographed by Alonzo King. Swayze and Niemi also produced the film, starred in it, and composed some of the music.

Swayze made his debut in London's West End in the musical Guys and Dolls as Nathan Detroit on July 27, 2006, alongside Neil Jerzak and Jordan McGhee, and remained in the role until November 25, 2006. His previous appearances on the Broadway stage included productions of Goodtime Charley in 1975 and Chicago (as Billy Flynn). Swayze also provided the voice for Cash the country music band dog in The Fox and the Hound 2 (2006), and in 2007 he starred in the film Christmas in Wonderland. Swayze played an aging rock star in Powder Blue (2009), co-starring his younger brother Don in their first film together.

In his final role, Swayze starred as FBI agent Charles Barker in the A&E drama The Beast, which was filmed in Chicago. Swayze was diagnosed with pancreatic cancer shortly after filming the pilot episode, but continued working on the show while receiving treatment. The Beast premiered on January 15, 2009, and ran for one season. Reviewer Alan Sepinwall wrote: "[When] you watch Swayze in The Beast, [you] realize that this is the best performance of his career—that the opportunity to play a part like this, and to play it as well as he is, may be fueling his ability to keep fighting against the cancer. And you realize, in an odd silver lining, that the cancer may, in turn, be fueling the performance."

== Personal life ==
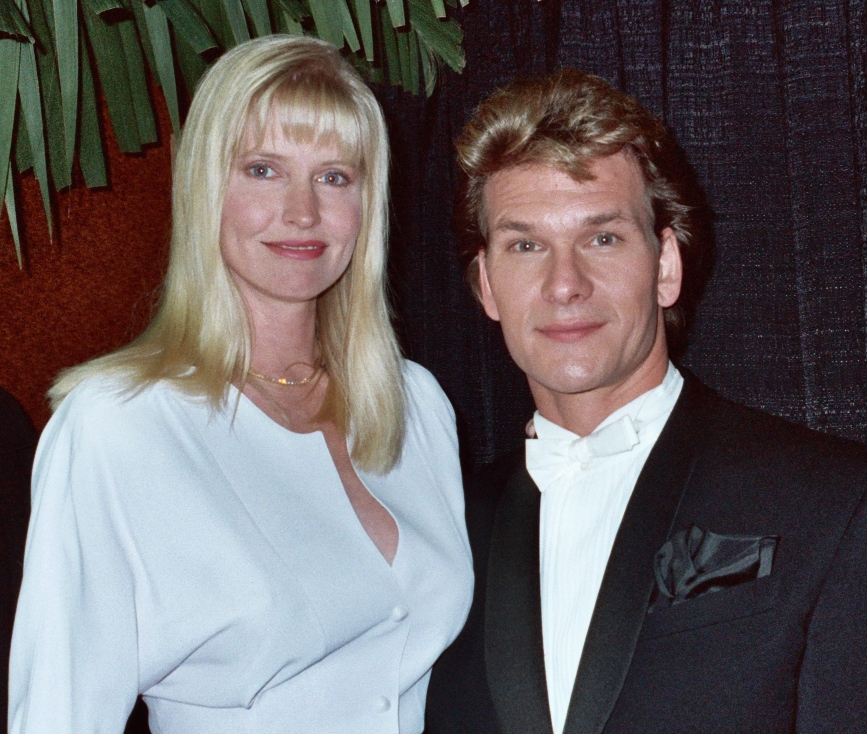
Swayze and his wife, Lisa Niemi, at the 1990 Grammy Awards

Swayze was married to Lisa Niemi for 34 years, from June 12, 1975, until his death. They had no children, though Niemi experienced one miscarriage. The two met in 1970, when Swayze was 18 and Niemi, then 14, was taking dance lessons from his mother. In a 2008 interview, Swayze said that Niemi inspired his 1987 song "She's Like the Wind" (1987).

He was an advocate of transcendental meditation and practiced Buddhism throughout his life. He explored Soka Gakkai Buddhism, zen buddhism, Scientology, and, earlier in life, EST training and therapy, as well as Transcendental Meditation. Swayze said he enjoyed learning about different belief systems, how they mattered to others, and why respecting diverse religious teachings was important to him.

Swayze publicly discussed his 10-year struggle with alcoholism following his father's death. He entered rehabilitation in the 1990s and, after recovering, temporarily stepped away from acting. He spent time on his ranches in California and New Mexico, where he bred Arabian horses. His best‑known horse was Tammen, a chestnut Arabian stallion.

Swayze, an FAA-certificated pilot with an instrument rating, made news on June 1, 2000, while flying with his dogs in his twin-engine Cessna 414, N414PS, from Van Nuys, California, to Las Vegas, New Mexico. A pressurization problem forced him to make a precautionary landing on a dirt road in a housing development in Prescott Valley, Arizona. The plane's right wing struck a light pole, but Swayze was uninjured. According to the police report, witnesses said he appeared extremely intoxicated and asked for help removing evidence from the crash site, including an open bottle of wine and a 30‑pack of beer. He was unavailable to police for several hours. It was later determined that the alcohol had been stored in external compartments inaccessible during flight, and that the probable cause of the accident was physical impairment from cumulative carbon monoxide exposure from engine exhaust, carbon monoxide from heavy tobacco use, and a loss of cabin pressurization, resulting in hypoxia.

On December 27, 2006, Swayze and Niemi, also a certificated pilot, experienced a second incident while flying the Cessna 414 to their New Mexico ranch. During the climb from their departure airport, they lost power and then suffered a total failure of the right engine. Niemi, who was in the pilot's seat, landed the aircraft safely in Van Nuys. After this second incident, the couple sold the Cessna 414 and purchased a Beechcraft Super King Air, N400KW, through their company, Prop Jocks Inc., in June 2007.

== Illness and death ==
In late December 2007, shortly after filming the pilot episode for The Beast, Swayze began experiencing a burning sensation in his abdomen caused by a blockage in his bile ducts. Three weeks later, in mid-January 2008, he was diagnosed with stage IV pancreatic cancer. He went to Stanford University Medical Center for chemotherapy and treatment with the experimental drug vatalanib, which doctors hoped would cut off the tumor's blood supply.

On March 5, 2008, a Reuters article stated that Swayze's disease was limited in extent and that he appeared to be responding well to treatment. His doctor confirmed the pancreatic cancer diagnosis, but emphasized that Swayze was not as close to death as some reports had claimed. Despite repeated tabloid stories predicting his imminent death, Swayze continued to work. In early May 2008, several tabloids reported that he had undergone surgery to remove part of his stomach after the cancer had spread, and that he had rewritten his will to transfer his property to his wife. He made his first public appearance since his diagnosis at a Los Angeles Lakers game in late May. On May 28, Swayze said he was continuing to respond well to treatment at Stanford. In June 2008, he stated that his treatments were working and that he was beating the cancer.

In September 2008, a very frail Swayze appeared on the ABC, NBC, and CBS simulcast of Stand Up to Cancer, urging the public to donate to the initiative. He told the audience, "I dream that the word 'cure' will no longer be followed by the words 'it's impossible'." After the broadcast, he stayed on stage to speak with other cancer patients, including executive producer Laura Ziskin, who was battling advanced breast cancer and later died from the disease. On December 2, 2008, Swayze denied tabloid claims that the cancer had spread to his liver.

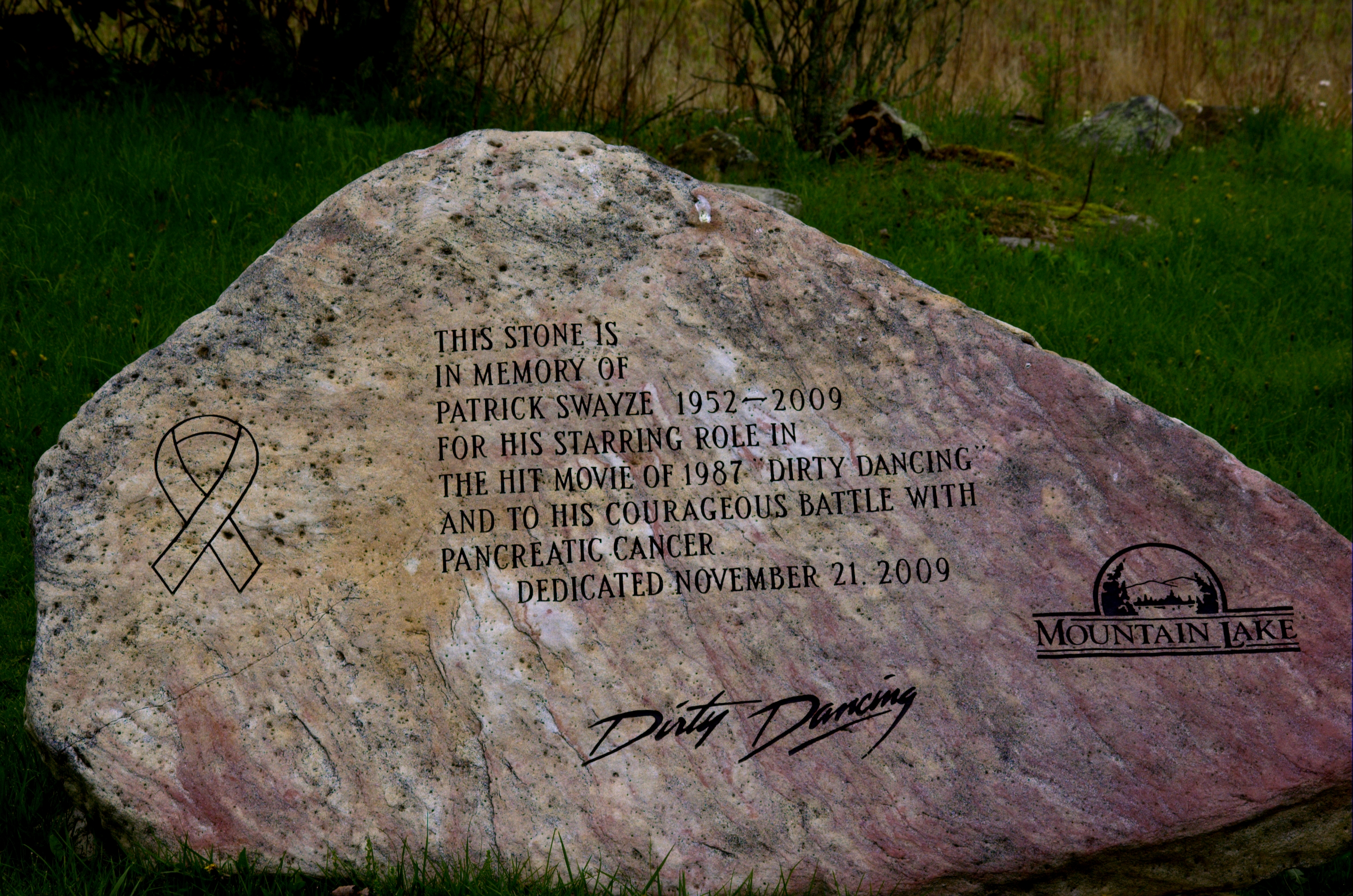
Memorial stone for Swayze dedicated in November 2009, at Mountain Lake Hotel where Dirty Dancing was filmed

In an interview with Barbara Walters that aired in January 2009, Swayze acknowledged that he had "a tiny little mass" in his liver but said he wanted the media to report that he was "kicking it". When asked whether he was using holistic or alternative treatments in addition to chemotherapy, he said he was taking some Chinese herbs, but criticized unsupported claims made by proponents of alternative methods.

On January 9, 2009, Swayze was hospitalized with pneumonia, a complication of chemotherapy. He was released on January 16 to rest at home with his wife. On April 19, 2009, doctors informed him that the cancer had again metastasized to his liver.

Swayze had been a smoker for 40 years and once said he smoked 60 cigarettes a day. He believed his chain smoking likely contributed to his illness, yet he continued smoking during treatment.

Swayze died at his home on September 14, 2009, at age 57. His publicist confirmed to CNN that he had died of pancreatic cancer.

== Filmography ==
=== Film ===
Year	Title	Role	Notes
1979	Skatetown, U.S.A.	Ace Johnson	
1983	The Outsiders	Darrel "Darry" Curtis	
1983	Uncommon Valor	Kevin Scott	
1984	Grandview, U.S.A.	Ernie "Slam" Webster	
1984	Red Dawn	Jed Eckert	
1986	Youngblood	Derek Sutton	
1987	Dirty Dancing	Johnny Castle	
1987	Steel Dawn	Nomad	
1988	Tiger Warsaw	Chuck "Tiger" Warsaw	
1989	Road House	James Dalton	
1989	Next of Kin	Truman Gates	
1990	Ghost	Sam Wheat	
1991	Point Break	Bodhi	
1992	The Player	Himself	Scene deleted
1992	City of Joy	Max Lowe	
1993	Father Hood	Jack Charles	
1995	Tall Tale: The Unbelievable Adventures of Pecos Bill	Pecos Bill	
1995	To Wong Foo, Thanks for Everything! Julie Newmar	Vida Boheme	
1995	Three Wishes	Jack McCloud	
1998	Black Dog	Jack Crews	
1998	Letters from a Killer	Race Darnell	
2000	Forever Lulu	Ben Clifton	
2001	Green Dragon	Gunner Sergeant Jim Lance	
2001	Donnie Darko	Jim Cunningham	
2002	Waking Up in Reno	Roy Kirkendall	
2003	One Last Dance	Travis MacPhearson	Also producer
2003	11:14	Frank	
2004	Dirty Dancing: Havana Nights	Dance Class Instructor	Cameo
2004	George and the Dragon	Garth	
2005	Keeping Mum	Lance	
2006	The Fox and the Hound 2	Cash	Voice
2007	Christmas in Wonderland	Wayne Saunders	
2007	Jump!	Richard Pressburger	
2009	Powder Blue	Velvet Larry	Final film role

=== Television ===
Year	Title	Role	Notes
1980	The Comeback Kid	Chuck	Television debut; television movie
1981	M*A*S*H	Private Gary Sturgis	Episode: "Blood Brothers"
1981	Return of the Rebels	K.C. Barnes	Television movie
1983	The Renegades	Bandit	Series regular; 6 episodes
1984	Pigs vs. Freaks	Doug Zimmer	Television movie
1985–1986	North and South - Book 1 & 2	Orry Main	Miniseries; 12 episodes
1985	Amazing Stories	Eric David Peterson	Episode: "Life on Death Row"
1990	Saturday Night Live	Himself (Host)	Episode: "Patrick Swayze/Mariah Carey"; Notable comedy sketch "Chippendales Audition" performance with comedian Chris Farley
2004	King Solomon's Mines	Allan Quartermain	Miniseries; 2 episodes
2004	Whoopi	Tony	Episode: "One Last Dance"
2005	Icon	Jason Monk	Television movie
2009	The Beast	Charles Barker / Apache	Series regular; 13 episodes; final acting role

=== Theatre ===
Year	Title	Role	Notes
1974	The Music Man	Ensemble	Paper Mill Playhouse
1975	Goodtime Charley	Dancer / Servant	Broadway
1977	West Side Story	Riff	Northstage Theatre Restaurant
1977	Grease	Danny Zuko	Broadway
2003	Chicago	Billy Flynn	Broadway
2003-2004	Chicago	Billy Flynn	US Tour
2006	Guys and Dolls	Nathan Detroit	West End

== Discography ==
=== Soundtrack appearances ===
Year	Title	Artist(s)	Album
1987	"She's Like the Wind"	Patrick Swayze, Wendy Fraser	Dirty Dancing
1989	"Raising Heaven (in Hell) Tonight"	Patrick Swayze	Road House
1989	"Cliff's Edge"	Patrick Swayze	Road House
1989	"Brothers"	Patrick Swayze, Larry Gatlin	Next of Kin
2003	"When You Dance"	Patrick Swayze, Suzie Rose and Jimmy Demers	One Last Dance
2003	"Finding My Way Back"	Patrick Swayze	One Last Dance

== Awards and nominations ==
Swayze received multiple awards and nominations throughout his career for his work both film and television. During his film career he received three Golden Globe award nominations for Best Lead Actor in a Motion Picture – Comedy or Musical for his roles in Dirty Dancing, Ghost and To Wong Foo Thanks for Everything!, Julie Newmar. In 1996, he received a star on the Hollywood Walk of Fame for his contribution to Motion Picture, located at 7018 Hollywood, Blvd.

Year	Work	Award	Category	Results
1987	North and South: Book II	Bravo Otto Award	Best Male TV Star	Nominated
1988	North and South: Book II	Aftonbladet TV Prize Award	Best Foreign Television Personality – Male	Won
1988	Tiger Warsaw	Bravo Otto Award	Best Actor	Won
1988	Dirty Dancing	Golden Globe Award	Best Lead Actor in a Motion Picture – Comedy or Musical	Nominated
1988	Dirty Dancing	Nickelodeon Kid's Choice Award	Favorite Movie Actor	Nominated
1989	Dirty Dancing	BMI Film & TV Award	Most Performed Song from a Film	Won
1989	Road House	Bravo Otto Award	Best Actor	Nominated
1990	Ghost	Bravo Otto Award	Best Actor	Nominated
1990	Next of Kin; Road House	Golden Raspberry Award	Worst Lead Actor	Nominated
1991	Point Break	Bravo Otto Award	Best Actor	Nominated
1991	Ghost	Golden Globe Award	Best Lead Actor in a Motion Picture – Comedy or Musical	Nominated
1991	Ghost	Saturn Award	Best Lead Actor	Nominated
1991	Next of Kin; Road House	Yoga Award	Worst Foreign Actor	Won
1992	Point Break	MTV Movie + TV Award	Most Desirable Male	Nominated
1992	—N/a	ShoWest Convention Award	Male Star of the Year	Won
1996	To Wong Foo Thanks for Everything!, Julie Newmar	Golden Globe Award	Best Lead Actor in a Motion Picture – Comedy or Musical	Nominated
2009	—N/a	Houston Film Critics Society	Lifetime Achievement Award	Won
