= List of British films of 2013 =

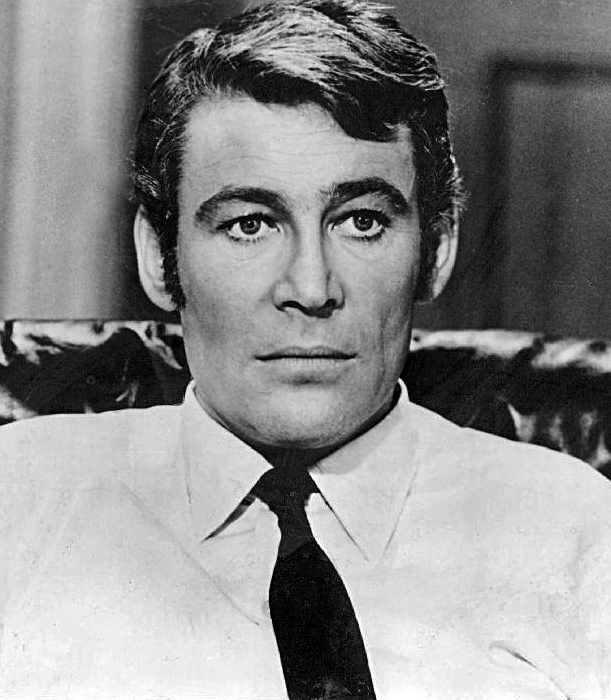
2013 saw the death of Peter O'Toole.

The British film industry produced over five hundred feature films in 2013. This article fully lists all non-pornographic films, including short films, that had a release date in that year and which were at least partly made by the United Kingdom. It does not include films first released in previous years that had release dates in 2013.

Also included is an overview of the major events in British film, including film festivals and awards ceremonies, as well as lists of those films that were particularly well received, both critically and financially. The year was particularly notable for a number of low budget and independent horror films, such as In Fear, Devil's Pass, Dementamania and Stalled.

== Major releases ==
=== January – March ===
Opening		Title	Cast and crew	Details	Genre(s)	Ref.
J A N U A R Y	5	Fedz	Director: Q Cast: Q, Joseph Marcell, Wil Johnson	Top Dog	Crime; Thriller	
J A N U A R Y	18	Austenland	Director: Jerusha Hess; Cast: Keri Russell, JJ Feild, Bret McKenzie, Jennifer Coolidge, James Callis, Jane Seymour	Sony Pictures Classics; Based on Austenland by Shannon Hale	Romance; Comedy	
J A N U A R Y	18	The Wee Man	Director: Ray Burdis; Cast: Patrick Bergin, Simon DeSilva, Martin Compston, John Hannah, Steve Daly, Alastair Thomson Mills, Jim Sweeney	Carnaby International; Based on the life of Paul Ferris	Crime; Drama	
J A N U A R Y	20	In Fear	Director: Jeremy Lovering; Cast: Iain De Caestecker, Alice Englert, Allen Leech	StudioCanal UK	Horror	
J A N U A R Y	20	Metro Manila	Director: Sean Ellis; Cast: Jake Macapagal, Althea Vega, John Arcilla	Independent	Crime; Drama	
J A N U A R Y	20	Stoker	Director: Park Chan-wook; Cast: Mia Wasikowska, Matthew Goode, Nicole Kidman, Dermot Mulroney, Jacki Weaver	20th Century Fox	Thriller; Horror	
J A N U A R Y	20	The East	Director: Zal Batmanglij; Cast: Brit Marling, Alexander Skarsgård, Elliot Page, Patricia Clarkson	Fox Searchlight Pictures	Thriller	
F E B R U A R Y	4	Gangs of Tooting Broadway	Director: Devanand Shanmugam; Cast: Nav Sidhu, Kabelan Verlkumar, Oliver Cotton, Terence Anderson	Tooting Broadway Films	Crime; Drama	
F E B R U A R Y	8	I Give It a Year	Director: Dan Mazer; Cast: Rose Byrne, Rafe Spall, Anna Faris, Simon Baker, Stephen Merchant, Minnie Driver	StudioCanal	Comedy; Romance	
F E B R U A R Y	8	The Fall of the Essex Boys	Director: Paul Tanter; Cast: Simon Phillips, Nick Nevern, Kierston Wareing	Metrodome Distribution; Based on the Rettendon murders (1995)	Thriller	
F E B R U A R Y	13	A Single Shot	Director: David M. Rosenthal; Cast: Sam Rockwell, Jeffrey Wright, Kelly Reilly, Jason Isaacs, Joe Anderson, Ophelia Lovibond, Ted Levine, William H. Macy	Based on A Single Shot by Matthew F. Jones	Crime; Thriller	
F E B R U A R Y	14	Run for Your Wife	Director: John Luton; Cast: Danny Dyer, Denise van Outen, Sarah Harding	Based on Run for Your Wife by Ray Cooney	Comedy	
F E B R U A R Y	18	Silent Night, Bloody Night: The Homecoming	Director: James Plumb; Cast: Adrienne King, Alan Humphreys, Mel Stevens, Sabrina Dickens, Philip Harvey	North Bank Entertainment	Horror	
F E B R U A R Y	21	Cal	Director: Christian Martin; Cast: Wayne Virgo, Tom Payne, Emily Corcoran, Lucy Russell	TLA Releasing; Sequel to Shank (2009)	Drama	
F E B R U A R Y	24	Welcome to the Punch	Director: Eran Creevy; Cast: James McAvoy, Mark Strong, Andrea Riseborough, Elyes Gabel, David Morrissey	Momentum Pictures	Action; Thriller	
M A R C H	4	Pulp	Directors: Adam Hamdy, Shaun Magher; Cast: Jay Sutherland, Gavin Molloy, Simon Burbage, Lucy Cudden, John Thomson	Xbox Live; First feature film to be distributed via a games console platform.	Comedy	
M A R C H	10	Everyone's Going to Die	Director: Jones; Cast: Nora Tschirner, Rob Knighton		Drama	
M A R C H	15	Vinyl	Director: Sara Sugarman, Cast: Phil Daniels, Keith Allen, Jamie Blackley	Based on the life of Mike Peters	Comedy	
M A R C H	19	Trance	Director: Danny Boyle; Cast: James McAvoy, Vincent Cassel, Rosario Dawson	Fox Searchlight Pictures	Thriller	

=== April – June ===
Opening		Title	Cast and crew	Details	Genre(s)	Ref.
A P R I L	5	All Things to All Men	Director: George Isaac; Cast: Gabriel Byrne, Rufus Sewell, Toby Stephens, Elsa Pataky, Gil Darnell	Universal Pictures	Thriller	
A P R I L	18	The Numbers Station	Director: Kasper Barfoed; Cast: John Cusack, Malin Åkerman	Image Entertainment	Action; Thriller	
A P R I L	20	The Machine	Director: Caradog W. James; Cast: Caity Lotz, Sam Hazeldine, Toby Stephens, Pooneh Hajimohammadi, Denis Lawson	Content Media	Science fiction Thriller	
A P R I L	25	The Best Years	Director: Danny Patrick; Cast: Martin Kemp, Matt Healy		Comedy; Crime; Drama	
A P R I L	26	The Look of Love	Director: Michael Winterbottom; Cast: Steve Coogan, Imogen Poots, Anna Friel, Tamsin Egerton	StudioCanal UK; Based on Members Only: The Life and Times of Paul Raymond by Paul Willetts	Biography	
A P R I L	27	Welcome to the Jungle	Director: Rob Meltzer; Cast: Jean-Claude Van Damme, Adam Brody, Megan Boone, Rob Huebel, Kristen Schaal, Dennis Haysbert, Kristopher Van Varenberg, Bianca Bree	Universal Pictures	Comedy	
M A Y	3	All Stars	Director: Ben Gregor; Cast: Theo Stevenson, Akai Osei-Mansfield, Ashley Jensen, Fleur Houdijk, Dominic Herman-Day, Amelia Clarkson		Comedy	
M A Y	16	The Bling Ring	Director: Sofia Coppola; Cast: Israel Broussard, Katie Chang, Taissa Farmiga, Claire Julien, Emma Watson, Leslie Mann	A24 Films; Based on The Suspects Wore Louboutins by Nancy Jo Sales	Comedy; Drama; Crime	
M A Y	16	The Selfish Giant	Director: Clio Barnard; Cast: Conner Chapman, Shaun Thomas, Sean Gilder, Lorraine Ashbourne, Ian Burfield, Steve Evets	IFC Films	Drama	
M A Y	19	Inside Llewyn Davis	Director: Joel Coen, Ethan Coen; Cast: Oscar Isaac, Carey Mulligan, John Goodman, Garrett Hedlund, F. Murray Abraham, Justin Timberlake	CBS Films; Based on the life of Dave Van Ronk	Comedy; Drama	
M A Y	20	The Last Days on Mars	Director: Ruairí Robinson; Cast: Liev Schreiber, Elias Koteas, Romola Garai, Goran Kostić, Johnny Harris, Tom Cullen, Yusra Warsama, Olivia Williams	Magnolia Pictures; Based on The Animators by Sydney J. Bounds	Science fiction Horror	
M A Y	24	Monsoon Shootout	Director: Amit Kumar; Cast: Nawazuddin Siddiqui, Tannishtha Chatterjee	Sikhya Entertainment, DAR Motion Pictures	Thriller	
M A Y	25	Only Lovers Left Alive	Director: Jim Jarmusch; Cast: Tilda Swinton, Tom Hiddleston, Mia Wasikowska, Anton Yelchin, Jeffrey Wright, Slimane Dazi, John Hurt	Soda Pictures	Drama; Horror; Romance	
J U N E	3	The Amityville Asylum	Director: Andrew Jones; Cast: Sophia Del Pizzo, Sarah Louise Madison, Eileen Daly	4Digital Media, Hannover House; Part of the Amityville film series	Horror	
J U N E	4	Having You	Director: Sam Hoare; Cast: Anna Friel, Romola Garai, Andrew Buchan, Phil Davis, Harry Hadden-Paton	Wigwam Films	Drama	
J U N E	10	Man of Steel	Director: Zack Snyder; Cast: Henry Cavill, Amy Adams, Michael Shannon, Diane Lane, Kevin Costner, Laurence Fishburne, Antje Traue, Ayelet Zurer, Christopher Meloni, Russell Crowe	Warner Bros. Pictures; Based on the Superman comic books by Jerry Siegel and Joe Shuster	Superhero; Science fiction Action	
J U N E	14	Summer in February	Director: Christopher Menaul; Cast: Dominic Cooper, Emily Browning, Dan Stevens, Hattie Morahan	Metrodome Distribution; Based on Summer in February by Jonathan Smith	Romance; Drama	
J U N E	21	Svengali	Director: John Hardwick; Cast: Martin Freeman, Vicky McClure, Matt Berry, Michael Socha, Michael Smiley, Natasha O'Keeffe, Jonny Owen		Comedy; Musical	
J U N E	22	We Are the Freaks	Director: Justin Edgar; Cast: Michael Smiley, Amber Anderson, Jamie Blackley, Rosamund Hanson, Hera Hilmar, Mike Bailey, Sean Teale	Metrodome	Comedy	
J U N E	25	Uwantme2killhim?	Director: Andrew Douglas; Cast: Jamie Blackley, Toby Regbo, Joanne Froggatt, Jaime Winstone, Amy Wren	Jumping Jack Films	Drama; Thriller	
J U N E	27	About Time	Director: Richard Curtis; Cast: Domhnall Gleeson, Rachel McAdams, Bill Nighy, Lydia Wilson, Lindsay Duncan, Tom Hollander, Vanessa Kirby, Margot Robbie	Universal Pictures	Romance; Science fiction Drama; Comedy	
J U N E	27	Outpost: Rise of the Spetsnaz	Director: Kieran Parker; Cast: Bryan Larkin, Iván Kamarás, Michael McKell		Science fiction Horror	
J U N E	28	Hummingbird	Director: Steven Knight; Cast: Jason Statham, Agata Buzek, Christian Brassington, Vicky McClure, Benedict Wong, Ger Ryan	Lionsgate	Action; Drama	
J U N E	28	The Act of Killing	Director: Joshua Oppenheimer	Det Danske Filminstitut	Documentary	
J U N E	30	Not Another Happy Ending	Director: John McKay; Cast: Karen Gillan, Stanley Weber, Iain De Caestecker, Freya Mavor, Amy Manson, Gary Lewis, Kate Dickie, Henry Ian Cusick	Kaleidoscope Home Entertainment	Romance; Comedy	

=== July – September ===
Opening		Title	Cast and crew	Details	Genre(s)	Ref.
J U L Y	5	A Field in England	Director: Ben Wheatley; Cast: Julian Barratt, Peter Ferdinando, Reece Shearsmith, Michael Smiley	Film4 Productions	Historical; Thriller	
J U L Y	5	Bula Quo!	Director: Stuart St. Paul; Cast: Jon Lovitz, Craig Fairbrass, Laura Aikman, Francis Rossi, Rick Parfitt	Universal Pictures	Adventure; Comedy	
J U L Y	5	Hammer of the Gods	Director: Farren Blackburn; Cast: Charlie Bewley, Clive Standen, James Cosmo	Magnet Releasing	Action	
J U L Y	10	The Callback Queen	Director: Graham Cantwell; Cast: Amy-Joyce Hastings, Mark Killeen, Seán T. O'Meallaigh, Ger Ryan, Vicki Michelle, Eoin Macken		Romance; Comedy	
J U L Y	10	The World's End	Director: Edgar Wright; Cast: Simon Pegg, Nick Frost, Rosamund Pike, Paddy Considine, Bill Nighy, Pierce Brosnan, Michael Smiley, Eddie Marsan	Universal Pictures; Part of the Three Flavours Cornetto trilogy	Comedy; Science fiction	
J U L Y	10	Trap for Cinderella	Director: Iain Softley; Cast: Tuppence Middleton, Alexandra Roach, Kerry Fox, Aneurin Barnard, Frances de la Tour, Emilia Fox	Lions Gate Entertainment; Based on Trap for Cinderella by Sébastien Japrisot	Drama; Crime	
J U L Y	16	The Wolverine	Director: James Mangold; Cast: Hugh Jackman, Hiroyuki Sanada, Tao Okamoto, Rila Fukushima, Famke Janssen, Will Yun Lee, Svetlana Khodchenkova, Brian Tee, Haruhiko Yamanouchi	20th Century Fox; Based on Wolverine by Chris Claremont and Frank Miller	Action; Science fiction Superhero	
J U L Y	19	Stalled	Director: Christian James; Cast: Dan Palmer. Chris R Wright, Mark Holden, Marcus Kelly, Russell Biles	Cubicle Hero	Comedy; Horror	
J U L Y	24	Frequencies	Director: Darren Paul Fisher; Cast: Daniel Fraser, Eleanor Wyld	FilmBuff	Science fiction Romance	
J U L Y	26	Stranded	Director: Roger Christian; Cast: Christian Slater	Image Entertainment	Science fiction Horror	
A U G U S T	1	The Invisible Life	Director: Vítor Gonçalves; Cast: Filipe Duarte, Maria João Pinho, João Perry, Susana Arrais, Pedro Lamares	Rosa Filmes	Drama	
A U G U S T	7	Alan Partridge: Alpha Papa	Director: Declan Lowney; Cast: Steve Coogan, Felicity Montagu, Simon Greenall, Colm Meaney, Sean Pertwee, Anna Maxwell Martin	StudioCanal; Based on the I'm Alan Partridge television series.	Action; Comedy	
A U G U S T	9	Exhibition	Director: Joanna Hogg; Cast: Viv Albertine, Liam Gillick, Tom Hiddleston	Artificial Eye	Drama	
A U G U S T	14	Kick-Ass 2	Director: Jeff Wadlow; Cast: Aaron Taylor-Johnson, Christopher Mintz-Plasse, Chloë Grace Moretz, Jim Carrey, Clark Duke, Olga Kurkulina	Universal Pictures; Sequel to Kick-Ass (2010)	Action; Comedy	
A U G U S T	14	Under the Skin	Director: Jonathan Glazer; Cast: Scarlett Johansson	StudioCanal; Based on Under the Skin by Michel Faber	Science fiction Horror; Art	
A U G U S T	22	The Dead 2: India	Directors: Howard J. Ford, Jon Ford; Cast: Joseph Millson, Meenu Mishra, Anand Krishna Goyal	Anchor Bay Entertainment; Sequel to The Dead (2010)	Horror	
A U G U S T	23	Dementamania	Director: Kit Ryan; Cast: Sam Robertson, Kal Penn, Vincent Regan, Geoff Bell	Parkgate Entertainment	Horror	
A U G U S T	23	Devil's Pass	Director: Renny Harlin; Cast: Holly Goss, Matt Stokoe, Luke Albright, Ryan Hawley, Gemma Atkinson	IFC Films; Based on the Dyatlov Pass incident (1959)	Science fiction Horror	
A U G U S T	24	The Paranormal Diaries: Clophill	Directors: Kevin Gates, Michael Bartlett; Cast: Craig Stovin, Criselda Cabitac, Kevin Gates	Second Sight Films	Horror	
A U G U S T	24	The Borderlands	Director: Elliot Goldner; Cast: Gordon Kennedy, Robin Hill, Aidan McArdle		Horror	
A U G U S T	28	Closed Circuit	Director: John Crowley; Cast: Eric Bana, Rebecca Hall, Ciarán Hinds, Jim Broadbent	Universal Pictures	Crime; Thriller	
A U G U S T	28	Gravity	Director: Alfonso Cuarón; Cast: Sandra Bullock, George Clooney	Warner Bros. Pictures	Science fiction Thriller	
A U G U S T	30	12 Years a Slave	Director: Steve McQueen; Cast: Chiwetel Ejiofor, Michael Fassbender, Benedict Cumberbatch, Paul Dano, Paul Giamatti, Lupita Nyong'o, Sarah Paulson, Brad Pitt	Summit Entertainment; Based on Twelve Years a Slave by Solomon Northup	Historical; Drama	
A U G U S T	30	Starred Up	Director: David Mackenzie; Cast: Jack O'Connell, Ben Mendelsohn, Rupert Friend	Fox Searchlight; Based on the life of Jonathan Asser	Crime; Drama	
A U G U S T	31	Philomena	Director: Stephen Frears; Cast: Judi Dench, Steve Coogan	Pathé; Based on The Lost Child of Philomena Lee by Martin Sixsmith	Drama	
A U G U S T	31	The Invisible Woman	Director: Ralph Fiennes; Cast: Ralph Fiennes, Felicity Jones, Kristin Scott Thomas, Tom Hollander, Joanna Scanlan, John Kavanagh	Sony Pictures Classics; Based on The Invisible Woman by Claire Tomalin	Biography; Drama	
S E P T E M B E R	2	Locke	Director: Steven Knight; Cast: Tom Hardy	A24	Drama	
S E P T E M B E R	2	Rush	Director: Ron Howard; Cast: Chris Hemsworth, Daniel Brühl, Alexandra Maria Lara, Pierfrancesco Favino, Natalie Dormer	StudioCanal; Based on the life of James Hunt	Drama; Biography	
S E P T E M B E R	2	The Zero Theorem	Director: Terry Gilliam; Cast: Christoph Waltz, Mélanie Thierry, David Thewlis, Lucas Hedges	Stage 6 Films	Science fiction	
S E P T E M B E R	3	Still Life	Director: Uberto Pasolini; Cast: Eddie Marsan		Drama	
S E P T E M B E R	4	Riddick	Director: David Twohy; Cast: Vin Diesel, Jordi Mollà, Matt Nable, Katee Sackhoff, Dave Bautista, Bokeem Woodbine, Raoul Trujillo, Karl Urban	Universal Pictures; Sequel to The Chronicles of Riddick (2004)	Science fiction Thriller	
S E P T E M B E R	5	Diana	Director: Oliver Hirschbiegel; Cast: Naomi Watts, Naveen Andrews	Metrodome Distribution; Based on Diana: Her Last Love by Kate Snell	Biography; Drama	
S E P T E M B E R	5	The Fifth Estate	Director: Bill Condon; Cast: Benedict Cumberbatch, Daniel Brühl	DreamWorks Pictures; Inside WikiLeaks by Daniel Domscheit-Berg	Thriller; Biography	
S E P T E M B E R	6	Jadoo	Director: Amit Gupta; Cast: Amara Karan, Harish Patel, Kulvinder Ghir, Tom Mison, Ray Panthaki, Madhur Jaffrey		Comedy	
S E P T E M B E R	6	The Railway Man	Director: Jonathan Teplitzky; Cast: Colin Firth, Nicole Kidman, Jeremy Irvine, Stellan Skarsgård	Lionsgate; Based on The Railway Man by Eric Lomax	War	
S E P T E M B E R	7	Ida	Director: Paweł Pawlikowski; Cast: Agata Kulesza, Agata Trzebuchowska, Dawid Ogrodnik	Artificial Eye	Historical; Drama	
S E P T E M B E R	7	Jimi: All Is by My Side	Director: John Ridley; Cast: André Benjamin, Hayley Atwell, Burn Gorman, Imogen Poots, Ruth Negga	Content Media; Based on the life of Jimi Hendrix	Drama	
S E P T E M B E R	7	Le Week-End	Director: Roger Michell; Cast: Jim Broadbent, Lindsay Duncan, Jeff Goldblum	Curzon Film World	Drama	
S E P T E M B E R	7	The Double	Director: Richard Ayoade; Cast: Jesse Eisenberg, Mia Wasikowska, Wallace Shawn, Noah Taylor, Yasmin Paige, James Fox	StudioCanal; Based on The Double by Fyodor Dostoyevsky	Thriller; Comedy	
S E P T E M B E R	8	Belle	Director: Amma Asante; Cast: Gugu Mbatha-Raw, Tom Wilkinson, Miranda Richardson, Penelope Wilton, Sam Reid, Matthew Goode, Emily Watson, Sarah Gadon, Tom Felton	DJ Films; Based on the life of Dido Elizabeth Belle	Drama; Romance	
S E P T E M B E R	8	Dom Hemingway	Director: Richard Shepard; Cast: Jude Law, Richard E. Grant, Demián Bichir, Emilia Clarke	Lionsgate	Comedy; Crime; Drama	
S E P T E M B E R	8	Half of a Yellow Sun	Director: Biyi Bandele; Cast: Chiwetel Ejiofor, Thandie Newton, Onyeka Onwenu, Anika Noni Rose, Genevieve Nnaji, OC Ukeje, John Boyega	Metro International; Based on Half of a Yellow Sun by Chimamanda Ngozi Adichie	Historical; Drama	
S E P T E M B E R	9	Coherence	Director: James Ward Byrkit; Cast: Emily Baldoni, Maury Sterling, Nicholas Brendon	Oscilloscope Pictures	Science fiction Thriller	
S E P T E M B E R	9	One Chance	Director: David Frankel; Cast: James Corden, Julie Walters	The Weinstein Company; Based on the life of Paul Potts	Biography; Comedy; Drama	
S E P T E M B E R	9	Sunshine on Leith	Director: Dexter Fletcher; Cast: George MacKay, Antonia Thomas, Freya Mavor, Kevin Guthrie, Peter Mullan, Jane Horrocks, Jason Flemyng	EFD; Based on Sunshine on Leith by Stephen Greenhorn	Musical	
S E P T E M B E R	9	Third Person	Director: Paul Haggis; Cast: Liam Neeson, Mila Kunis, Adrien Brody, Olivia Wilde, James Franco, Moran Atias, Maria Bello, Kim Basinger	Sony Pictures Classics	Romance	
S E P T E M B E R	12	The Love Punch	Director: Joel Hopkins; Cast: Pierce Brosnan, Emma Thompson, Timothy Spall, Celia Imrie, Louise Bourgoin, Laurent Lafitte	Entertainment One	Comedy	
S E P T E M B E R	16	Filth	Director: Jon S. Baird; Cast: James McAvoy, Jamie Bell, Joanne Froggatt, Imogen Poots, Eddie Marsan, Jim Broadbent	Lionsgate; Based on Filth by Irvine Welsh	Crime; Comedy; Drama	
S E P T E M B E R	27	Mandela: Long Walk to Freedom	Director: Justin Chadwick; Cast: Idris Elba, Naomie Harris	20th Century Fox; Based on Long Walk to Freedom by Nelson Mandela	Biography; Drama	
S E P T E M B E R	28	Believe	Director: David Scheinmann; Cast: Brian Cox, Natascha McElhone, Anne Reid, Philip Jackson, Toby Stephens		Sports; Drama	

=== October – December ===
Opening		Title	Cast and crew	Details	Genre(s)
O C T O B E R	3	The Counsellor	Director: Ridley Scott; Cast: Michael Fassbender, Penélope Cruz, Cameron Diaz, Javier Bardem, Brad Pitt	20th Century Fox	Crime; Thriller
O C T O B E R	4	For Those in Peril	Director: Paul Wright; Cast: George MacKay	Warp Films	Drama
O C T O B E R	4	How I Live Now	Director: Kevin Macdonald; Cast: Saoirse Ronan, Tom Holland, Anna Chancellor	Entertainment One; Based on How I Live Now by Meg Rosoff	Drama
O C T O B E R	4	The Patrol	Director: Tom Petch; Cast: Owain Arthur, Nicholas Beveney, Daniel Fraser, Alex McNally, Oliver Mott, Ben Righton, Nav Sidhu		Action; War; Drama
O C T O B E R	10	Ten	Director: Craig Wyting; Cast: Colin Burt Vidler		Action; Drama; War
O C T O B E R	11	Romeo & Juliet	Director: Carlo Carlei; Cast: Douglas Booth, Hailee Steinfeld, Damian Lewis, Kodi Smit-McPhee, Ed Westwick, Stellan Skarsgård, Paul Giamatti	Entertainment Film Distributors; Based on Romeo and Juliet by William Shakespeare	Romance; Drama
O C T O B E R	13	Mindscape	Director: Jorge Dorado; Cast: Taissa Farmiga, Mark Strong, Brian Cox, Noah Taylor	Warner Bros.	Science fiction Thriller
O C T O B E R	18	Gone Too Far!	Director: Destiny Ekaragha; Cast: OC Ukeje, Adelayo Adedayo, Shanika Warren-Markland, Malachi Kirby	FilmOne Distribution; Based on Gone Too Far! by Bola Agbaje	Comedy; Drama
O C T O B E R	18	Last Passenger	Director: Omid Nooshin; Cast: Dougray Scott, Kara Tointon, Iddo Goldberg	Kaleidoscope	Thriller
O C T O B E R	20	Saving Mr. Banks	Director: John Lee Hancock; Cast: Emma Thompson, Tom Hanks, Paul Giamatti, Jason Schwartzman, Bradley Whitford, Colin Farrell	Walt Disney Studios Motion Pictures; Based on the life of P. L. Travers	Historical; Drama
O C T O B E R	21	Green Street 3: Never Back Down	Director: James Nunn; Cast: Scott Adkins, Kacey Barnfield, Joey Ansah, Mark Wingett, Matthew C Martino	Lionsgate Home Entertainment; Sequel to Green Street 2: Stand Your Ground (2005)	Action; Drama
O C T O B E R	25	Lord of Tears	Director: Lawrie Brewster; Cast: David Schofield	Hex Media, Dark Dunes Productions; Based on the legend of Owlman	Horror
O C T O B E R	26	Strange Factories	Director: John Harrigan; Cast: John Harrigan, Annalisa Astarita, Rachael Blyth		Drama; Horror
O C T O B E R	28	In the Sands of Babylon	Director: Mohamed Al-Daradji; Cast: Samer Qahtan, Ameer Jabarah		Drama
N O V E M B E R	8	Huff! It's Too Much	Director: Pushkar Jog; Cast: Pushkar Jog, Armeena Khan		Romance
N O V E M B E R	15	Another Me	Director: Isabel Coixet; Cast: Sophie Turner, Jonathan Rhys Meyers, Claire Forlani, Rhys Ifans	Fox International Productions; Based on Another Me by Catherine MacPhail	Mystery; Thriller
N O V E M B E R	21	Powder Room	Director: MJ Delaney; Cast: Sheridan Smith, Jaime Winstone, Kate Nash, Oona Chaplin, Riann Steele, Alice Sanders, Sarah Hoare, Johnnie Fiori	Vertigo Distribution; Based on When Women Wee by Rachel Hirons	Comedy
N O V E M B E R	22	Vendetta	Director: Stephen Reynolds; Cast: Danny Dyer, Vincent Regan, Bruce Payne	Anchor Bay	Action
N O V E M B E R	25	The Christmas Candle	Director: John Stephenson; Cast: Hans Matheson, Samantha Barks, Lesley Manville, Sylvester McCoy, James Cosmo, Susan Boyle, Barbara Flynn, John Hannah	Pinewood Studios	Drama
D E C E M B E R	6	Out of the Furnace	Director: Scott Cooper; Cast: Christian Bale, Woody Harrelson, Casey Affleck, Forest Whitaker, Willem Dafoe, Zoe Saldaña, Sam Shepard	Relativity Media	Thriller
D E C E M B E R	14	Walking with Dinosaurs	Directors: Neil Nightingale, Barry Cook; Cast: John Leguizamo, Justin Long, Tiya Sircar, Skyler Stone	20th Century Fox; Based on the Walking with Dinosaurs television series.	Animation; Documentary
D E C E M B E R	20	Moshi Monsters: The Movie	Directors: Wip Vernooij, Morgan Francis; Cast: Emma Tate, Tom Clarke Hill, Phillipa Alexander, Keith Wickham	Universal Pictures; Based on the Moshi Monsters website.	Adventure; Comedy; Animation
D E C E M B E R	20	The Harry Hill Movie	Director: Steve Bendelack; Cast: Harry Hill, Julie Walters, Matt Lucas, Simon Bird, Sheridan Smith, Johnny Vegas	Entertainment Film Distributors	Comedy Musical
D E C E M B E R	24	The House of Magic	Directors: Jeremy Degruson, Ben Stassen; Cast: Cinda Adams, George Babbit, Murray Blue, Kathleen Browers, Joey Camen, Grant George, Shanelle Workman, Nina Grillo, Kyle Hebert, Goldie Jonsie, Kendra Leif, Joe Ochman, Millie Mup, Will Parks, Sage Sommer, Michael Sorich, Doug Stone, Joseph W. Terry	Touchstone Pictures	Fantasy; Comedy; Animation
D E C E M B E R	25	Nymphomaniac	Director: Lars von Trier; Cast: Charlotte Gainsbourg, Stellan Skarsgård, Stacy Martin, Shia LaBeouf, Christian Slater, Uma Thurman, Sophie Kennedy Clark, Connie Nielsen, Jamie Bell, Willem Dafoe, Mia Goth, Michaël Pas, Jens Albinus, Jean-Marc Barr, Udo Kier	Les Films du Losange	Drama; Art
D E C E M B E R	25	The Hundred-Year-Old Man Who Climbed Out the Window and Disappeared	Director: Robert Gustafsson; Cast: Robert Gustafsson	Buena Vista International; Based on The Hundred-Year-Old Man Who Climbed Out the Window and Disappeared by Jonas Jonasson	Comedy

== Minor releases ==
Title	Director	Release date	Genre
15 Minutes to Inverness	David Rodowick		Adventure
2 Graves	Yvonne Mc Devitt	28 June 2013 (UK)	Drama
4:00 am	Robert Trott		Drama
7 Reasons Why	Gurmit Samra	15 May 2013 (France)	Drama
Abducted	Mark Harris		Action
Acquainted	Horace Chan		Drama
Act I	Wilson P.Y. Lau	16 March 2013 (UK)	Thriller
Addict	Geoff Harmer	12 April 2014 (UK)	Drama
Adieu Marx	Charis Orchard		Comedy
Ain't Misbehavin'	Oliver Sillito	28 September 2013 (UK)	Comedy
Ali: The Greatest	Billy Simpson	8 November 2013 (USA)	Biography
All Good Things	Krysten Resnick	17 July 2013 (UK)	Adventure
Amber	Miles Watts		Comedy
Amnesiac	Martin Rutley	1 March 2013 (UK)	Drama
Amoc	Erim Metto		Drama
The Anarchist's Birthday	Patrick Blake		Comedy
Angelina Ballerina: Dance Around the World	Charlotte Spencer	January 2013 (USA)	
Anna: Scream Queen Killer	The Aquinas	September 2013 (USA)	Drama
Another Knight to Remember	Geoff Wonfor	1 May 2013 (UK)	Musical
The Answer to Everything	Rupert Jones	April 2013 (UK)	Drama
Any Minute Now	Peter Goddard	15 October 2013 (USA)	Drama
The Arbiter	Kadri Kõusaar	14 March 2013 (Estonia)	Drama
Art Is...	Barry Bliss	April 2013 (UK)	Musical
Ashens and the Quest for the Gamechild	Riyad Barmania	8 August 2013 (UK)	Adventure
Assignment	Paul T.T. Easter	21 October 2013 (UK)	Thriller
Aune, or on Effective Demise	Maija Timonen	January 2013 (UK)	Horror
AutoMatron, Welcome to Paradise	Andrew Senior		Adventure
Back to the Garden	Jon Sanders	22 September 2013 (UK)	Drama
Back with the Boys Again – Auf Wiedersehen Pet 30th Anniversary Reunion	Geoff Wonfor	1 December 2013 (UK)	Biography
Barbarian	Robin Morningstar	5 November 2014 (UK)	Fantasy
Barg Rizan	Ali Jaberansari	25 August 2013 (Canada)	Drama
Before Dawn	Dominic Brunt	8 June 2013 (Japan)	Horror
The Befuddled Box of Betty Buttifint	Janis Pugh		Drama
Behind the Eyes	Chris Cory	8 July 2013 (UK)	Thriller
Behind the Scenes of Total Hell	Andy Wilton	22 April 2013 (UK)	Comedy
Behold Me Standing	Wilma Smith	7 July 2013 (UK)	Drama
Benjamin Britten: Peace and Conflict	Tony Britten	February 2013 (UK)	Biography
The Better Man	Josh Bennett	June 2013 (UK)	Comedy
The Betrayal of Paul Cezanne	Mike Akester		Drama
Black Lightning Dream	Nicky Preston		Horror
Blackbird	Jamie Chambers	25 June 2013 (UK)	Drama
Blisters for Blighty: The Curious World of Race Walking	Michael Normand	28 June 2013 (UK)	Comedy
Bloodline	David Easton	6 June 2013 (UK)	Thriller
Borderlands	Ben Mallaby		Action
Born of War	Vicky Jewson	5 December 2013 (Cyprus)	Action
Boys Behind Bars	Jason Impey	13 October 2013 (UK)	Drama
Breakfast with Jonny Wilkinson	Simon Sprackling	22 November 2013 (UK)	Comedy
Breathless Awakening	Djonny Chen	2013 (UK)	Drama
The Brightest Colours Make Grey	Daniel Audritt	4 July 2013 (UK)	Comedy
Bruno & Earlene Go to Vegas	Simon Savory	9 July 2013 (UK)	Adventure
The Buskers & Lou	Alex Cassun	1 August 2013 (USA)	Drama
C.A.M.	Steve Du Melo		Horror
The Captive	Luke Massey	7 January 2014 (USA)	Horror
Cardiff City Season Review 2012–2013	Graham Keyte	10 June 2013 (UK)	Sports
Carlos Gustavo	Master Chet		Action
Carpe Diem	Eric Hinwood		Adventure
The Cashier	Radley Mason		Comedy
Castles Made of Sand	Mungo Benson	20 November 2013 (UK)	Drama
The Chase	Faolan Jones		Action
Chasing Borders	Ryan Claffey	3 September 2013 (UK)	Drama
Christmas Hear Kids	Chris Purnell	1 December 2013 (UK)	Drama
Chronicles of Humanity: Uprising	Damien Valentine	15 April 2013 (UK)	Animation
City of Tales	Johny Brown	6 September 2013 (UK)	Musical
Coffee in Winter	Manjeet S Gill		Drama
Cold Turkey	Rob Ineson	31 July 2013 (UK)	Drama
The Comedy Store: Raw & Uncut	Jon Lloyd	22 February 2013 (UK)	Comedy
Common People	Stewart Alexander	10 June 2014 (UK)	Comedy
Communion	Greg Hall	1 August 2013 (UK)	Drama
Confine	Tobias Tobbell	1 July 2013 (UK)	Thriller
The Crack	Phil Vasili	2013 (UK)	Comedy
Crossland	Mumtaz Yildirimlar	5 January 2013 (UK)	Thriller
Cruel as a Wound	Kevin Lucero Less	21 June 2013 (USA)	Drama
Damaged Goods	Mike Tweddle	18 August 2013 (UK)	Drama
Dance of the Steel Bars	Cesar Apolinario	12 June 2013 (Philippines)	Drama
Dante's Daemon	Wyndham Price	31 May 2013 (UK)	Drama
Dark Rainbow	Sam Baxter	February 2013 (UK)	Comedy
The Dead Inside	Andrew Gilbert	14 October 2013 (UK)	Action
Dead of the Nite	S.J. Evans	4 April 2013 (UK)	Horror
Dead Walkers: Rise of the 4th Reich	Philip Gardiner	1 April 2014 (UK)	Horror
Deadly Intent	Rebekah Fortune		Drama
Delicious	Tammy Riley-Smith	5 October 2013 (South Korea)	Comedy
Delight	Gareth Jones	1 August 2014 (UK)	Drama
Detention	Erim Metto		Drama
The Devil's Plantation	May Miles Thomas	23 February 2013 (UK)	Mystery
The Diana Clone	Jason Ritchie		Comedy
Dimension Zero	Andrew MacKenzie	7 April 2013 (UK)	Drama
Discord	Daniel Mckenzie-Cossou	2013 (UK)	Action
Dissection			Horror
Doctor Who: Besieged	Lauren Lamarr	7 June 2013 (UK)	Science fiction
The Dossier	Jennifer Darling	2013 (UK)	Drama
Dream On	Lloyd Eyre-Morgan	10 June 2013 (UK)	Drama
Dumar	Aaron Thomas	27 December 2013 (UK)	Thriller
The Dying Eye	Shiphrah Meditz	1 October 2013 (UK)	Crime
Dying Light	David Newbigging		Horror
e-luv	Warren Dudley	1 February 2013 (UK)	Comedy
The East London Story: Slap or Die	Sukhdeep Sanghera	26 December 2013 (UK)	Comedy
Eat. Sleep. Repeat.	Colin Grant		Comedy
Eddie Izzard: Force Majeure Live	Sarah Townsend	18 November 2013 (UK)	Comedy
Elbow Live at Jodrell Bank	Matt Askem	25 November 2013 (UK)	Musical
Emeli Sandé Live at the Royal Albert Hall	Paul Dugdale	18 February 2013 (UK)	Musical
Endless Life	Michael MacBroom	May 2013 (UK)	Comedy
The Enigma	Gage Oxley	11 December 2013 (UK)	Drama
Entwinement	Rob Burrows	1 May 2013 (UK)	Drama
Environmental Enforcement	Louisa Rowley		Comedy
Essex Boys Retribution	Paul Tanter	2 December 2014 (Netherlands)	Crime
The Essex Warriors	Eddie Bammeke		Action
Eva and Noah	Richard Hajdú		Drama
Eva's Diamond	Ice Neal	2 February 2013 (USA)	Drama
Event 15	Matthew Thompson	17 June 2014 (USA)	Thriller
Event of the Year	Anthony M. Winson	25 October 2013 (UK)	Horror
Evil Bread	Andy Ward	12 July 2013 (UK)	Comedy
Evil Scarecrow: Head, Shoulders, Knees & Crows	Evil Scarecrow	2 November 2013 (UK)	Musical
Exodus	Mina Radovic	24 June 2013 (UK)	Science fiction
Exorcist Chronicles	Philip Gardiner	1 April 2013 (USA)	Horror
The Factory	Richard John Taylor	26 January 2013 (UK)	Romance
Fallen Angels	Luke Mordue	7 July 2013 (UK)	Crime
The Fallen Word	Oliver Harrison	10 May 2013 (UK)	Drama
A Fallible Girl	Conrad Clark	27 January 2013 (Netherlands)	Drama
Faraway	Stephen Don	18 April 2013 (UK)	Action
Fast Life	Creeper Crisis		Drama
Faust's Growth	John Eyre		Drama
The Film-Maker's Son	Bart Gavigan	September 2013 (UK)	Drama
First Light	Tom Calder		Drama
Five Pillars	Jon Rosling		Drama
The Flight of the Flamingo	Nick Hilton		Comedy
Foals Live at the Royal Albert Hall	Dave Ma	28 October 2013 (UK)	Musical
The Fold	John Jencks	28 March 2014 (UK)	Drama
Folie à Trois	Danielle Jadelyn		Drama
Followed	Wilson P.Y. Lau		Crime
Following the Wicca Man	Jacqueline Kirkham	29 November 2013 (UK)	Horror
For Love's Sake	Andrew Walkington	17 June 2013 (USA)	Drama
Friends of Money	Adam Lee Hamilton	26 April 2013 (UK)	Drama
Fulham Season Review 2012–2013	Graham Keyte	17 June 2013 (UK)	Sport
Future Shift	Suza Singh	9 December 2013 (Canada)	Action
Game, But Whose Game Is It?	Miles Roston	2 September 2013 (Netherlands)	Drama
Gangsters, Goons & Psychopaths	Ranjeet S. Marwa	18 September 2013 (UK)	Comedy
Get Lucky	Sacha Bennett	21 March 2013 (Bahrain)	Action
Gilgamesh	Edward Picot		Animation
Going Under	Anthony Crossland	July 2013 (UK)	Drama
Great Expectations	Graham McLaren	21 March 2013 (USA)	Drama
The Great Sherlock Holmes Debate 4	Steve Emecz	1 July 2013 (UK)	
The Great Walk	Clive Austin	22 February 2013 (UK)	Comedy
Grid	Callum Rees	1 March 2013 (UK)	Action
The Gun, the Cake and the Butterfly	Amanda Eliasch	31 May 2013 (UK)	Drama
Halloween One Good Scare	David Hastings	25 October 2013 (UK)	Historical
Ham & the Piper	Mark Norfolk	7 April 2013 (USA)	Drama
Happy Hours	Steve Sullivan		Comedy
The Harbinger	Martin Tempest	4 December 2013 (UK)	Adventure
Harrigan	Vince Woods	20 September 2013 (UK)	Action
Haunted	Steven M. Smith	21 October 2013 (USA)	Horror
Haze and Fog	Cao Fei	22 September 2013 (UK)	
Hear the Doors	Leonora Lim-Moore		Drama
Heckle	Robbie Moffat	2013 (UK)	Comedy
Hector's Wait	Nick Box	1 April 2013 (UK)	Animation
Hello Carter	Anthony Wilcox	12 October 2013 (UK)	Comedy
Hero Shy	Oskarjon Ho' Chan	September 2013 (USA)	Comedy
Hichestan	Hernan Diaz Laserna	11 October 2013 (Iran)	Drama
Histoires de l'âge d'or islamique	Teresa Griffiths	2013 (France)	Historical
Hollows Wood 3D	Richard Connew	31 May 2013 (UK)	Drama
Horrorshow	Grant McPhee	3 February 2013 (UK)	Musical
Hot Wings	Mitch Panayis	1 June 2013 (UK)	Crime
Hotspot	Vitor Vilela	13 April 2013 (UK)	Fantasy
Hotspot: Log in at Own Risk	Vitor Vilela		Fantasy
How to Become a Criminal Mastermind	Henry Scriven	11 September 2013 (UK)	Comedy
HSP: There Is No Escape from the Terrors Of the Mind	Rouzbeh Rashidi	September 2013 (Australia)	Fantasy
Hundreds Tens and Units	Georg Schmidt		Drama
I Am from Chile	Gonzalo Diaz	10 April 2014 (Chile)	Comedy
I Know What I'm Doing	Robbie Moffat	20 May 2013 (France)	Comedy
I, a Slave	Suj Ahmed	1 October 2013 (Romania)	Drama
I Was Saddam's Son		14 June 2015 (UK)	Biography
Ice Dancing the Raw Edge	Jim Ford	21 January 2013 (UK)	Sport
An Illustrated Silence	Jasmine Wingfield	17 August 2013 (USA)	Musical
I'm Still Here	Kris Smith	1 September 2013 (UK)	Drama
Impirioso	Sarah Baker	1 June 2013 (UK)	Drama
In Mid Wickedness	William Oldroyd	2 December 2013 (UK)	Drama
In the Middle of No One	Paul Wheeler	1 January 2013 (UK)	Comedy
The Inconsiderates	Jason Ritchie		Comedy
Inside the Mind of Mr D.H.Lawrence	Armand Attard	20 January 2013 (UK)	Drama
Internal	Hursty	10 June 2013 (UK)	Crime
Island	Rehan Malik	October 2013 (UK)	Thriller
Isolated	Justin Le Pera	30 January 2013 (USA)	Adventure
It's a Lot	Darwood Grace	25 October 2013 (UK)	Comedy
It's a Love Thing	Andy Dodd	3 December 2015 (USA)	Romance
Jack Dee: So What? Live	Paul Wheeler	2013 (UK)	Comedy
Jayson Bend: Queen and Country	Matt Carter		Action
Jeff Wayne's Musical Version of the War of the Worlds Alive on Stage! The New Generation	Nick Morris	11 April 2013 (UK)	Musical
Jessie J: Alive at the O2	Paul Caslin		Musical
Judas Ghost	Simon Pearce	20 April 2015 (UK)	Fantasy
Justin Timberlake: Suited Up	Billy Simpson		Musical
Kain: In the Arms of Chaos	Matt Brownsett	2013 (UK)	Musical
Karl's Birthday	Donald Takeshita-Guy	14 September 2013 (UK)	Drama
Kid Gloves	Adam Simcox	2 March 2015 (UK)	Drama
Knight of the Dead	Mark Atkins	30 October 2014 (Kuwait)	Action
Kubricks	Dean Cavanagh	23 May 2013 (UK)	Drama
Lad: A Yorkshire Story	Dan Hartley	25 April 2013 (USA)	Drama
Lal	Semir Aslanyürek	25 April 2014 (Turkey)	Drama
The Last British Execution	Iain Cash	26 April 2013 (UK)	Comedy
Learning Hebrew	Louis Joon	13 June 2013 (UK)	Drama
Leave to Remain	Bruce Goodison	October 2013 (UK)	Drama
Leave to Stay	Awat Osman Ali	23 September 2013 (UK)	Drama
Legendary: Tomb of the Dragon	Eric Styles	1 January 2014 (China)	Action
Les Vêpres siciliennes	Eugène Scribe	4 November 2013 (UK)	Drama
Letters to Sofija	Robert Mullan	30 August 2013 (Lithuania)	
The Library	Daljinder Singh	3 May 2014 (UK)	Horror
The List	Klaus Hüttmann	2 November 2013 (Japan)	Thriller
Little Devil	Max Barber		Comedy
The Lobito	Antonio Dyaz	16 October 2013 (Spain)	Biography
London Kahanis	Armaan Kirmani	22 June 2013 (UK)	Drama
Lone Walker	Paul T.T. Easter	13 May 2013 (UK)	Drama
A Long Way from Home	Virginia Gilbert	6 December 2013 (UK)	Drama
Longtails	Elizabeth Arends		Crime
Loony in the Woods	Leo Leigh	2013 (USA)	Horror
The Lost Choices			Drama
The Lost Generation	Mark Ashmore	11 November 2013 (UK)	Thriller
Lost in Fugue	Errol Theriot	2013 (UK)	Drama
The Lost Mantle of Elijah	Lewis Critchley	21 May 2013 (UK)	Adventure
Love Freely But Pay for Sex	Phoenix James	21 May 2013 (UK)	Action
Love Me Till Monday	Justin Hardy	11 July 2014 (UK)	Romance
Made in Belfast	Paul Kennedy	2013 (UK)	Drama
The Magnificent Eleven	Jeremy Wooding	13 May 2013 (UK)	Comedy
Magpie	Marc Price	18 April 2013 (UK)	
The Making of Us	Graham Eatough	23 June 2013 (UK)	Drama
Mandela: Resistance	NJ Silva		Biography
A Mass for the Dying	Al Carretta	30 November 2013 (UK)	Drama
Mayerling	Jeff Tudor	13 June 2013 (UK)	Musical
McFly: 10th Anniversary Concert – Royal Albert Hall	David Spearing	16 December 2013 (UK)	Musical
Meet Me on the Southbank	Adam Rolston		Comedy
The Merchant	Justin Mosley	3 March 2013 (USA)	Drama
Merrily We Roll Along	George Furth	23 October 2013 (USA)	Musical
Metal Castle: The Musical	David Georgiou	5 September 2013 (UK)	Comedy
Miley Cyrus: Twerk It	NJ Silva		Musical
The Minnitts of Anabeg	Alan Brown		Drama
Mirrorvael	Nick Convery	14 April 2013 (UK)	Fantasy
Mistaken	Anthony Roberts	1 July 2013 (UK)	Action
Mister John	Joe Lawlor	27 September 2013 (UK)	Drama
Molly Crows	Ray Wilkes	5 April 2014 (UK)	Horror
More Sex, Lies & Depravity	Jason Impey	22 February 2013 (UK)	Drama
The Mule	Michael Radford	10 May 2013 (Spain)	Comedy
A Musical Review	Sally Martin	1 February 2013 (UK)	Musical
Narcissist	Michael Henry	1 April 2013 (UK)	Comedy
Nelson Mandela: The Struggle Is My Life (1918–2013)	Tom Barbor-Might	6 December 2013 (UK)	Biography
The Neuropath	Jack Murdoch		Comedy
The Neverending Love Story	Sathish Kumar	19 January 2013 (UK)	Thriller
Newcastle United Season Review 2012–2013	Graham Keyte	17 June 2013 (UK)	Sport
Night of the Bloody Antler	Lea Cummings		Horror
The Night of the Great Chinese Lottery	Marco Brunelli		Comedy
Night of the Living 3D Dead	Samuel Victor	7 October 2013 (UK)	Horror
Nightmare	Andrew Compton	May 2013 (UK)	Drama
No Smoke	Sue Shearing	3 September 2013 (UK)	Crime
A Noisy Delivery	Gerald Jupitter-Larsen	April 2013 (UK)	Drama
Not Guilty	Taiwo Oniye	22 July 2013 (USA)	Drama
O heimonas	Konstantinos Koutsoliotas	10 December 2014 (Greece)	Drama
The O'Briens	Richard Waters	28 April 2013 (USA)	Comedy
One	Brian George Hutton		Drama
One Man Flash Mob: The Lucien Simon Story	Lorn Macdonald	10 September 2013 (UK)	Comedy
Onus	George Clarke	4 February 2013 (UK)	Drama
Onye Ozi	Obi Emelonye	18 October 2013 (UK)	Comedy
The Orchard	Clive Myer	September 2013 (UK)	Drama
The Oscar Nominated Short Films 2013: Animation		1 February 2013 (USA)	Animation
Our Last Summer	David Burtonwood	28 April 2013 (UK)	Drama
Owlman	Richard Mansfield		Drama
Paradise Place	Paride Odierna	20 December 2013 (UK)	Comedy
Peter Grimes on Aldeburgh Beach	Margaret Williams	1 September 2013 (UK)	Musical
Pictures of Lily	Mark Banks		Drama
Piercing Brightness	Shezad Dawood	June 2013 (UK)	Drama
The Pink Marble Egg	Jonathan King	15 May 2013 (France)	Musical
The Possession of Billy	Robert Valentine	1 September 2013 (UK)	Horror
The Possession of Sophie Love	Philip Gardiner	17 September 2013 (USA)	Horror
The Power	Paul Hills	2013 (UK)	Horror
Primary School Musical!	Angus Reid		Musical
Project Reveal Real Ghost Hunters	Lee Steer	20 February 2013 (UK)	Horror
Punk '76	Mark Sloper	22 October 2013 (UK)	Musical
Queen Elizabeth II – The Diamond Celebration	Alan Byron		Biography
Quest: A Tall Tale	Thomas G. Murphy		Animation
The Rajini Effect	Kuvera Sivalingam		Comedy
Rambler	Patrick Quagliano	November 2013 (USA)	Action
Ravenswood	Marq English	1 June 2013 (UK)	Comedy
Red Sky	Patrick Michael Ryder	20 November 2013 (UK)	Thriller
Rehab	Sean J. Vincent		Horror
The Repairman	Paolo Mitton	19 February 2014 (Italy)	Comedy
Reprieve 2013	Luke Thomas Goold	1 June 2013 (UK)	Drama
Rewind 4Ever: The History of UK Garage	Alex Lawton	15 July 2013 (UK)	Musical
Ring of Faith	Kevin McIntyre		Drama
Robbie Williams Live from Tallinn	Russell Thomas	20 August 2013 (UK)	Musical
Robbie Williams: Take the Crown 2013	Russell Thomas	20 August 2013 (UK)	Musical
Rock and Roll Fuck'n'Lovely	Josh Bagnall	18 February 2013 (UK)	Drama
Roger	Nachi Minesaki	1 July 2013 (UK)	Drama
Rölli ja kultainen avain	Taavi Vartia	1 February 2013 (Finland)	Adventure
Roly's List	Steven Hines	21 March 2013 (UK)	Comedy
Royal Shakespeare Company: Richard II	Gregory Doran	13 November 2013 (UK)	Drama
RSJ	Rob Walker		Comedy
The Rubicon	Chucks Mordi	24 October 2013 (UK)	Drama
Rubicon or: Let's Talk About Hell	Frank Gelmeroda	19 October 2013 (USA)	Thriller
Russell Brand: Messiah Complex	Russell Brand	25 November 2013 (UK)	Comedy
Sable Fable	Stephen Lloyd Jackson	17 June 2013 (USA)	Drama
Sacrifice	Ryan Claffey	31 August 2013 (UK)	Crime
Saint Petersburg	Andrey Khvostov	10 August 2013 (Russia)	Drama
The Samuel Coleridge-Taylor Story	Jason Young	1 April 2013 (UK)	Animation
Sarah's Room	Grant McPhee	10 December 2013 (UK)	Fantasy
Save the Zombies	Federico Lopez	25 April 2014 (Spain)	Horror
Scar Tissue	Scott Michell	16 February 2015 (UK)	Thriller
Scarred	Gareth Fient	20 April 2013 (UK)	Drama
Scavenger Hunt	Robert Carrier		Adventure
Scorbie Relapse Live	Sam North	25 June 2013 (UK)	Musical
The Search for Simon	Martin Gooch	3 May 2013 (UK)	Comedy
Second Last Land	Thomas Nerling		Drama
Self Induced Nightmares	Dan Brownlie	4 November 2013 (UK)	Horror
The Shadow of Bigfoot	Philip Mearns	1 January 2013 (UK)	Thriller
Shakespeare's Globe: Henry V	Dominic Dromgoole	1 July 2013 (UK)	Comedy
Shame the Devil	Paul Tanter	30 June 2014 (UK)	Crime
Shameful Deceit	Ruke Amata	5 July 2013 (UK)	Drama
Shaqami Dr Qassimlu	Fathy Mirzaeian	2 May 2013 (Iraq)	Drama
Sheffield Wednesday Season Review 2012–2013	Graham Keyte	15 July 2013 (UK)	Sport
Shockwaves	Kasumi X		Comedy
Shortcuts to Hell: Volume 1	Debbie Attwell	23 August 2013 (UK)	Horror
Side by Side	Arthur Landon	12 October 2013 (UK)	Drama
Sixteen	Rob Brown	14 October 2013 (UK)	Thriller
The Sky in Bloom	Toor Mian	16 May 2013 (UK)	Crime
Sleeper	Mark Burnett	January 2013 (UK)	Science fiction
Sleeping Dogs	Floris Ramaekers	5 October 2013 (UK)	Thriller
Soho Cigarette	Jonathan Fairbairn		Action
Solito	Amit Gicelter	30 September 2013 (UK)	Comedy
Sommarstället	Johan von Reybekiel	21 April 2013 (Sweden)	Drama
Soulmate	Axelle Carolyn	26 October 2013 (UK)	Horror
Sound of Silence	Jorge Malpica		Drama
Spain's Worst Rail Disaster	Sean Pertwee	1 November 2013 (UK)	
Spirital Phantoma	Rares Ceuca	31 March 2013 (UK)	Horror
Stand-Up: A Documentary by Jennifer Darwin	Sezar Alkassab	18 September 2013 (UK)	Comedy
Star Wars: The Force Unleashed	Shaun Robertson	19 October 2013 (UK)	Science fiction
Stitch'd Up	Jayson Jacob Johnson		Comedy
Stricken	Lee Convery	10 September 2013 (UK)	Drama
Stunted Trees and Broken Bridges	Tom Leach	22 March 2013 (UK)	Science fiction
Super Tuesday	Al Carretta	20 August 2013 (UK)	Drama
Swan Lake 3D – Live from the Mariinsky Theatre	Ross MacGibbon	6 June 2013 (UK)	Musical
The Sweet Shop	Ben Myers	12 April 2013 (UK)	Drama
Switch: A Tale of Humility & Despair	Jordon Sendall	6 September 2013 (UK)	Comedy
Tales of the Supernatural: Naked	Mark Behar	9 December 2013 (UK)	Horror
Tamla Rose	Joe Scott	13 December 2013 (UK)	Musical
TEef: Bailey Jay	Aro Korol	1 October 2013 (UK)	Musical
Teenage Kicks	Joe Wheeler	9 June 2013 (UK)	Drama
Ten	Craig Wyting	10 October 2013 (UK)	Drama
They Love	Daniel Sowter	1 August 2013 (UK)	Horror
Third Row Centre	Lloyd Handley		Mystery
Through the Fire	Bryan Cook	3 December 2013 (UK)	Drama
Time Together	Mark Aerial Waller	29 September 2013 (UK)	Mystery
TimeLock	David Griffith	23 August 2013 (UK)	Crime
Titus	Charlie Cattrall	28 September 2013 (UK)	Drama
Tottenham Hotspur Season Review 2012–2013	Graham Keyte	17 June 2013 (UK)	Sport
Trauma	Trevor Hayward	6 December 2013 (UK)	Thriller
Traveller	Benjamin Johns	6 December 2013 (UK)	Drama
The Trial of Socrates	Natasa Prosenc Stearns		Drama
The Truth About Romance	James G. Wall	8 June 2013 (UK)	Comedy
Twilight of the Gods	Julian Doyle	4 March 2013 (USA)	Drama
Two Weeks Off	Timothy Halls	6 November 2013 (UK)	Adventure
Underbelly	Kye Loren	13 March 2015 (UK)	Action
Unlucky Bastard	Latif Yahia	9 June 2013 (UK)	Biography
Vacation Hunter	Daz Spencer-Lovesey	27 October 2013 (Belgium)	Adventure
Vampire Guitar: A High Vaultage Adventure	Richard Pawelko	1 July 2013 (UK)	Comedy
Van Helsinki	Matthew Edwards	13 September 2013 (UK)	Action
Verity's Summer	Ben Crowe	5 March 2013 (UK)	Drama
A Very Unsettled Summer	Anca Damian	1 November 2013 (Romania)	Drama
The View from Our House	Anthea Kennedy		Historical
Vigilante	Darren Bolton		Drama
A Viking Saga: The Darkest Day	Chris Crow	12 June 2013 (France)	Action
The Virgin Queen's Fatal Affair	Tom Cholmondeley	18 September 2013 (UK)	Historical
Visa	Avishai Sivan	June 2013 (Israel)	Comedy
Visions Composed	Timothy Davey	3 November 2013 (UK)	Drama
Void	Jack Ayers		Science fiction
Voodoo Magic	Elom Bell	1 October 2013 (UK)	Crime
Walk With Me?	Giada Dobrzenska		Biography
The Wanderer	Laure Prouvost	July 2013 (UK)	Drama
The Wanted: The Wanted Dream	NJ Silva	8 November 2013 (USA)	Musical
The Warehouse	Andrew McGeary		Drama
A Warning to the Curious	Ali Djarar	28 February 2013 (UK)	Horror
Wasteland	Tom Wadlow	26 October 2013 (France)	Drama
Wayland's Song	Richard Jobson	20 September 2013 (UK)	Drama
Weaverfish	Harrison Wall	9 October 2013 (UK)	Drama
The Wedding	Peter Andrew	12 September 2013 (UK)	Comedy
Welcome to the Majority	Russell Owen	12 April 2013 (UK)	Thriller
We're Here for a Good Time, Not a Long Time	Kerry Harrison		Drama
West Ham United Season Review 2012–2013	Graham Keyte	24 June 2013 (UK)	Sport
What Would Ridley Do?	Ross Howieson		Comedy
White Collar Hooligan 2: England Away	Paul Tanter	20 November 2013 (Australia)	Crime
White Lie	Nyima Cartier	3 July 2013 (France)	Thriller
White Rabbit	David Gowin	17 September 2013 (UK)	Fantasy
Who Needs Enemies	Peter Stylianou	29 November 2013 (UK)	Crime
Whoops!	Tony Hipwell	November 2013 (UK)	Comedy
The Wick: Dispatches from the Isle of Wonder	Tom Metcalfe		Comedy
The Witching Hour	Anthony M. Winson	28 February 2013 (UK)	Horror
Wizard's Way	Metal Man	25 January 2013 (UK)	Comedy
Wolfskin: Sister of the Wolf Spirits	Richard Mansfield		Animation
Woman from the East	Jeet Matharru		Drama
The Wonderful World of Bill Maynard	Rick McLeod	1 December 2013 (UK)	Biography
Xanadu	Dominic Reynolds	11 August 2013 (UK)	Comedy
Y Syrcas	Kevin Allen	13 December 2013 (UK)	Drama
Young, High and Dead	Luke Brady	13 September 2013 (UK)	Horror
Zk3	Michael J. Murphy	20 January 2013 (UK)	Horror
Zombie Hood	Steve Best	8 June 2013 (UK)	Horror
The Zombie King	Aidan Belizaire	31 May 2013 (Japan)	Comedy
Zombies from Ireland	Ryan Kift	4 January 2013 (UK)	Horror

== Co-productions ==
Of the 116 major British releases of 2013, 65 were co-productions with at least one other country. As with other years, the largest number of co-productions were made with the United States, with 37 films. They are listed in full below.

Rank	Country	Number	Films
1	United States (including Puerto Rico)	37	12 Years a Slave, A Single Shot, Austenland, Closed Circuit, Coherence, Devil's Pass, Filth, Gravity, Hummingbird, Inside Llewyn Davis, Jimi: All Is by My Side, Kick-Ass 2, Locke, Man of Steel, Mindscape, One Chance, Out of the Furnace, Philomena, Riddick, Rush, Saving Mr. Banks, Stoker, The Bling Ring, The Christmas Candle, The Counsellor, The East, The Numbers Station, The Wolverine, The World's End, The Zero Theorem, Third Person, Trance, Under the Skin, Vinyl, Walking with Dinosaurs, Welcome to the Jungle, Welcome to the Punch
2	France	17	Alan Partridge: Alpha Papa, Diana, I Give It a Year, Ida, Inside Llewyn Davis, Le Week-End, Mindscape, Nymphomaniac: Vol. I, Nymphomaniac: Vol. II, Only Lovers Left Alive, Philomena, The Bling Ring, The Hundred-Year-Old Man Who Climbed Out the Window and Disappeared, The Love Punch, The Zero Theorem, Third Person, Trance
3	Belgium	7	Diana, Filth, Nymphomaniac: Vol. I, Nymphomaniac: Vol. II, The Fifth Estate, The Numbers Station, Third Person
3	Germany	7	Filth, Nymphomaniac: Vol. I, Nymphomaniac: Vol. II, Only Lovers Left Alive, Rush, The Bling Ring, Third Person
5	Australia	5	Frequencies, Saving Mr. Banks, The Railway Man, The Wolverine, Walking with Dinosaurs
6	Denmark	4	Ida, Nymphomaniac: Vol. I, Nymphomaniac: Vol. II, The Act of Killing
6	Japan	4	Kick-Ass 2, The Bling Ring, The Wolverine, The World's End
6	Sweden	4	Diana, Filth, Nymphomaniac: Vol. II, The Hundred-Year-Old Man Who Climbed Out the Window and Disappeared
9	Canada	3	A Single Shot, Man of Steel, Stranded
9	Ireland	3	Jimi: All Is by My Side, Starred Up, The Last Days on Mars
9	Spain	3	Another Me, Mindscape, The Hundred-Year-Old Man Who Climbed Out the Window and Disappeared
9	Switzerland	3	Romeo & Juliet, The Railway Man, Under the Skin
13	India	2	Monsoon Shootout, The Fifth Estate
13	Italy	2	Romeo & Juliet, Still Life
13	Netherlands	2	In the Sands of Babylon, Monsoon Shootout
13	Nigeria	2	Gone Too Far!, Half of a Yellow Sun
13	Russia	2	Devil's Pass, The Hundred-Year-Old Man Who Climbed Out the Window and Disappeared
18	Fiji	1	Bula Quo!
18	Greece	1	Only Lovers Left Alive
18	Iraq	1	In the Sands of Babylon
18	Morocco	1	The Patrol
18	Norway	1	The Act of Killing
18	Poland	1	Ida
18	Portugal	1	The Invisible Life
18	Romania	1	The Zero Theorem
18	South Africa	1	Mandela: Long Walk to Freedom
18	United Arab Emirates	1	In the Sands of Babylon

== Highest grossing films ==
Listed here are the highest grossing British films of 2013, with their total earnings listed in British pound sterling. It includes films released in previous years that made money in 2013, particularly those that had minor releases in 2012 but their main releases in 2013.

Highest grossing British films of 2013
Rank	Title	Studio	Worldwide gross
1	Gravity	Warner Bros. Pictures	£472,250,000
2	Man of Steel	Warner Bros. Pictures	£436,200,000
3	The Wolverine	20th Century Fox	£270,860,000
4	12 Years a Slave	Summit Entertainment	£122,570,000
5	Walking with Dinosaurs	20th Century Fox	£82,600,000
6	Saving Mr. Banks	Walt Disney Studios Motion Pictures	£73,460,000
7	Philomena	Pathé	£65,370,000
8	Riddick	Universal Pictures	£64,190,000
9	Rush	StudioCanal	£58,900,000
10	About Time	Universal Pictures	£56,880,000

== Critical reception ==
Listed here are the top ten best and worst British films of those released in 2013, and listed above as major releases, as per the review aggregators Rotten Tomatoes and Metacritic. The critical scores for Rotten Tomatoes are out of a maximum score of 100, as is the critical score for Metacritic.

=== Rotten Tomatoes ===
Top 10 best reviewed films
Rank	Film	Rating	No. of reviews
1	Frequencies	100%	6
2	Starred Up	99%	101
3	Gravity	97%	307
4	The Selfish Giant	97%	74
5	12 Years a Slave	96%	290
6	Ida	96%	140
7	The Act of Killing	95%	133
8	Inside Llewyn Davis	94%	236
9	Metro Manila	93%	30
10	Philomena	92%	172

Top 10 worst reviewed films
Rank	Film	Rating	No. of reviews
1=	Run for Your Wife	0%	15
1=	Stranded	0%	15
3	The Fall of the Essex Boys	0%	5
4	Diana	8%	97
5	The Christmas Candle	18%	22
6	Vendetta	18%	11
7	The Last Days on Mars	20%	11
8	Romeo & Juliet	22%	83
9	Welcome to the Jungle	22%	9
10	Third Person	23%	101

=== Metacritic ===
Top 10 best reviewed films
Rank	Film	Rating	No. of reviews
1	12 Years a Slave	97	48
2	Gravity	96	49
3	Inside Llewyn Davis	92	47
4	Ida	91	35
5	The Act of Killing	89	30
6	The Selfish Giant	83	22
7	The World's End	81	45
8	Locke	81	37
9	Starred Up	81	26
10	For Those in Peril	79	9

Top 10 worst reviewed films
Rank	Film	Rating	No. of reviews
1	Summer in February	22	6
2	Welcome to the Jungle	25	7
3	Stranded	27	11
4	The Christmas Candle	33	13
5	Diana	35	28
6	Walking with Dinosaurs	37	21
7	Third Person	38	33
8	The Numbers Station	39	8
9	Trap for Cinderella	39	5
10	Kick-Ass 2	41	35

== British award winners ==
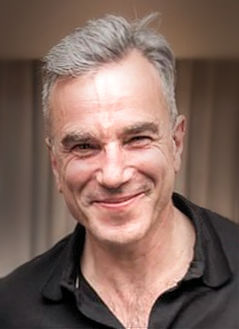
Sir Daniel Day-Lewis received the best leading actor award at all five major awards ceremonies for his portrayal of Abraham Lincoln in Lincoln.

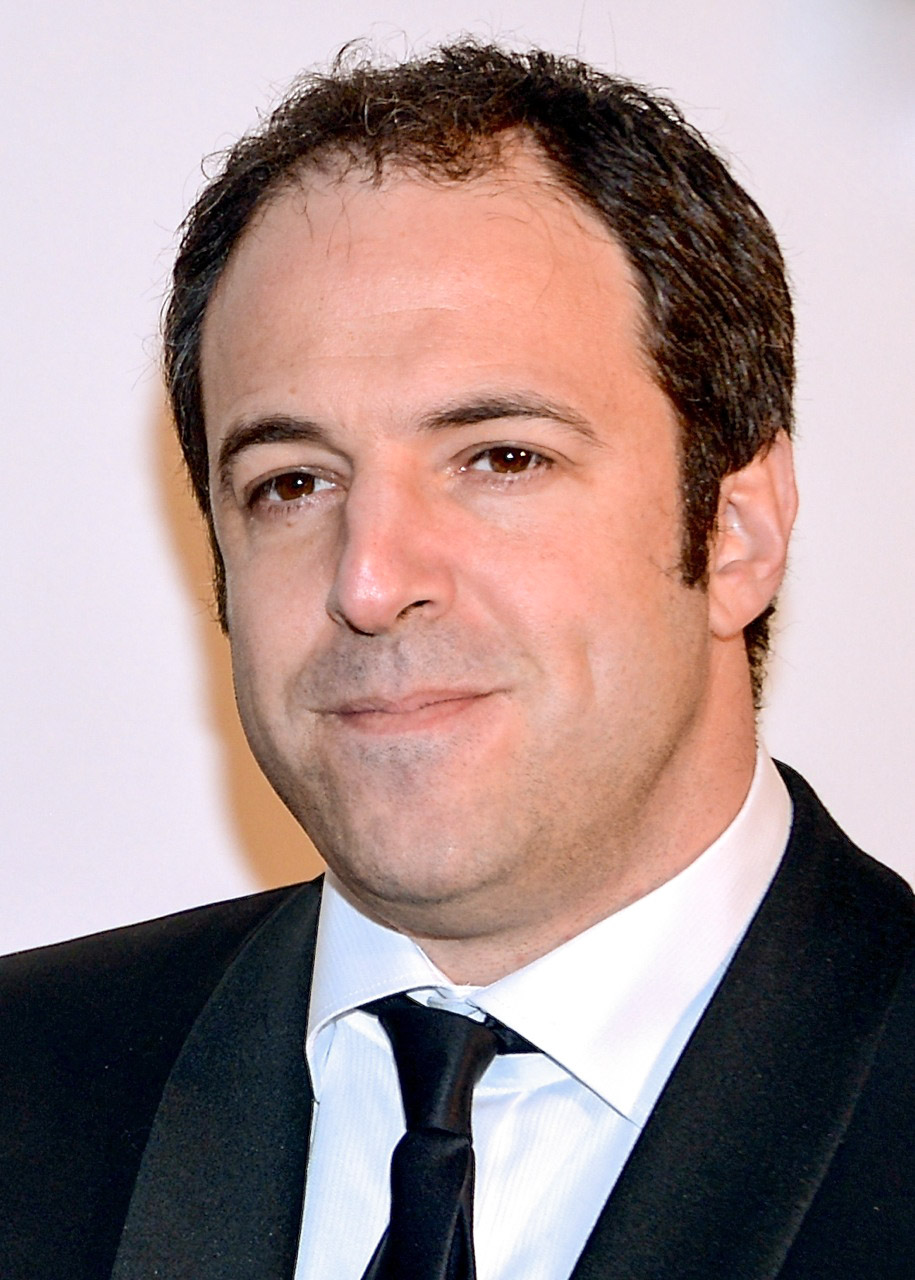
Simon Chinn, the multiple award-winning producer of Searching for Sugar Man.

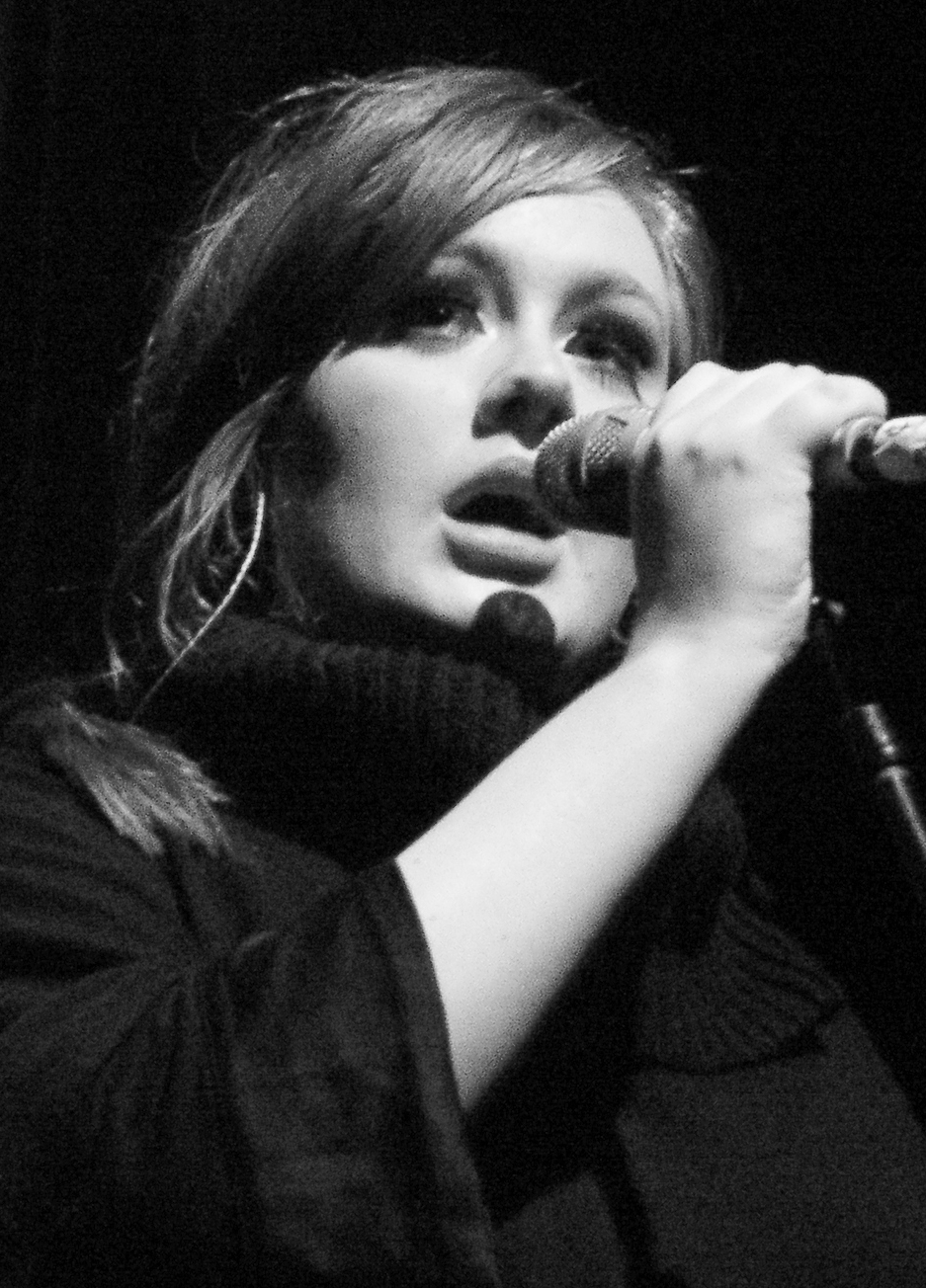
Adele won multiple awards for her song "Skyfall" from Skyfall.

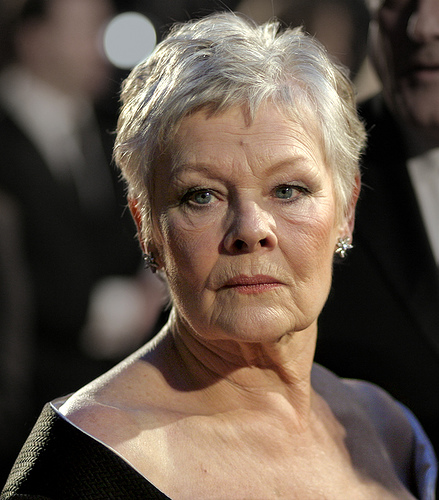
Dame Judi Dench received major awards nominations for two films – Skyfall and The Best Exotic Marigold Hotel.

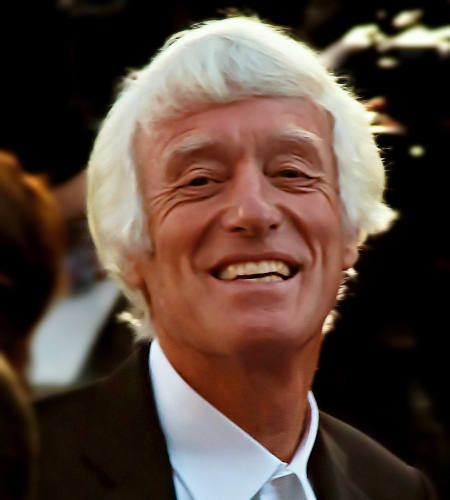
Roger Deakins received multiple awards nominations for his cinematography in Skyfall.

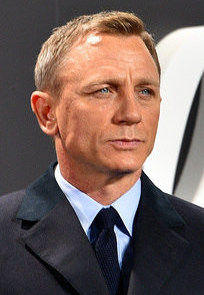
Daniel Craig won the Critics' Choice Award for Best Actor in an Action Movie.

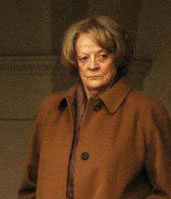
Dame Maggie Smith received major awards nominations for two films – The Best Exotic Marigold Hotel and Quartet.

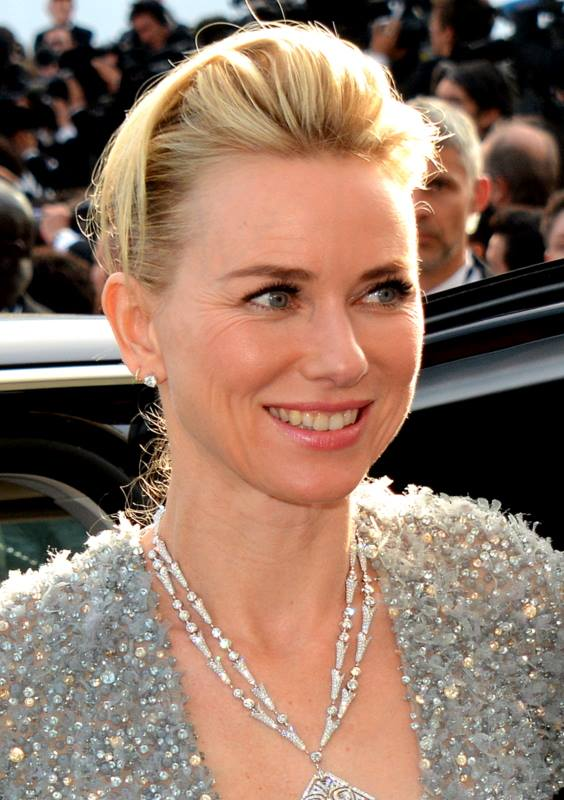
Naomi Watts received major awards nominations for her portrayal of Maria Bennett in The Impossible.

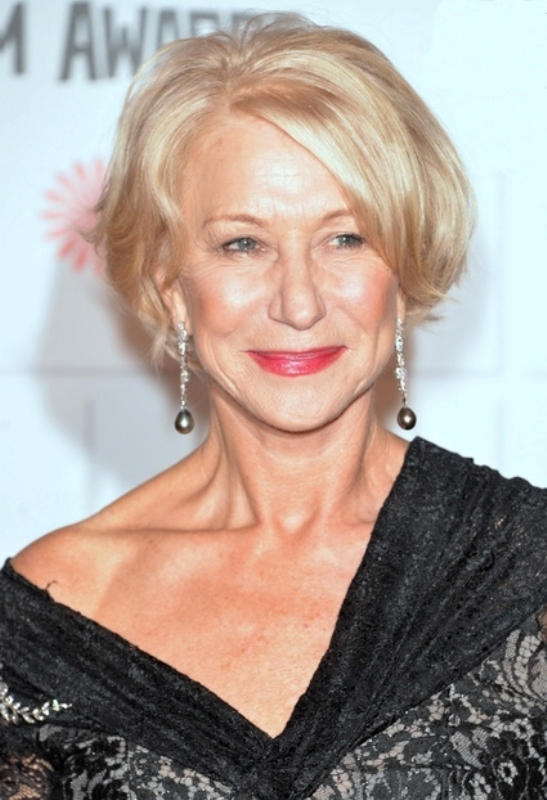
Dame Helen Mirren received multiple awards nominations for her portrayal of Alma Reville in Hitchcock.

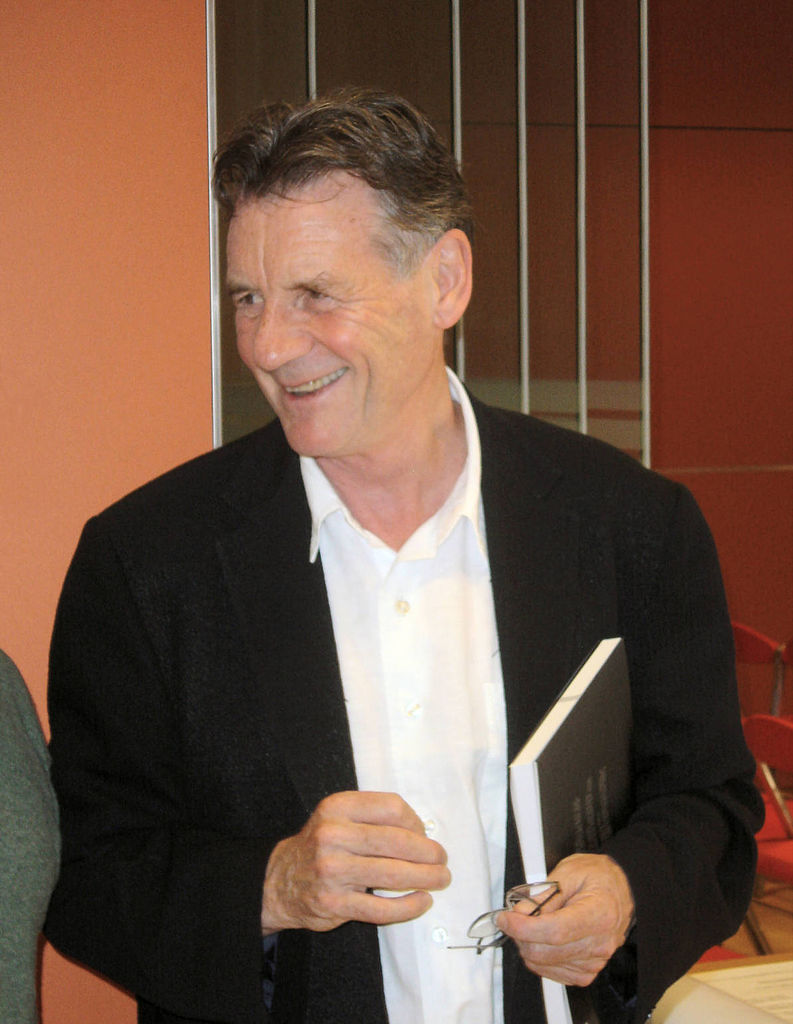
Michael Palin won the British Academy Fellowship Award.

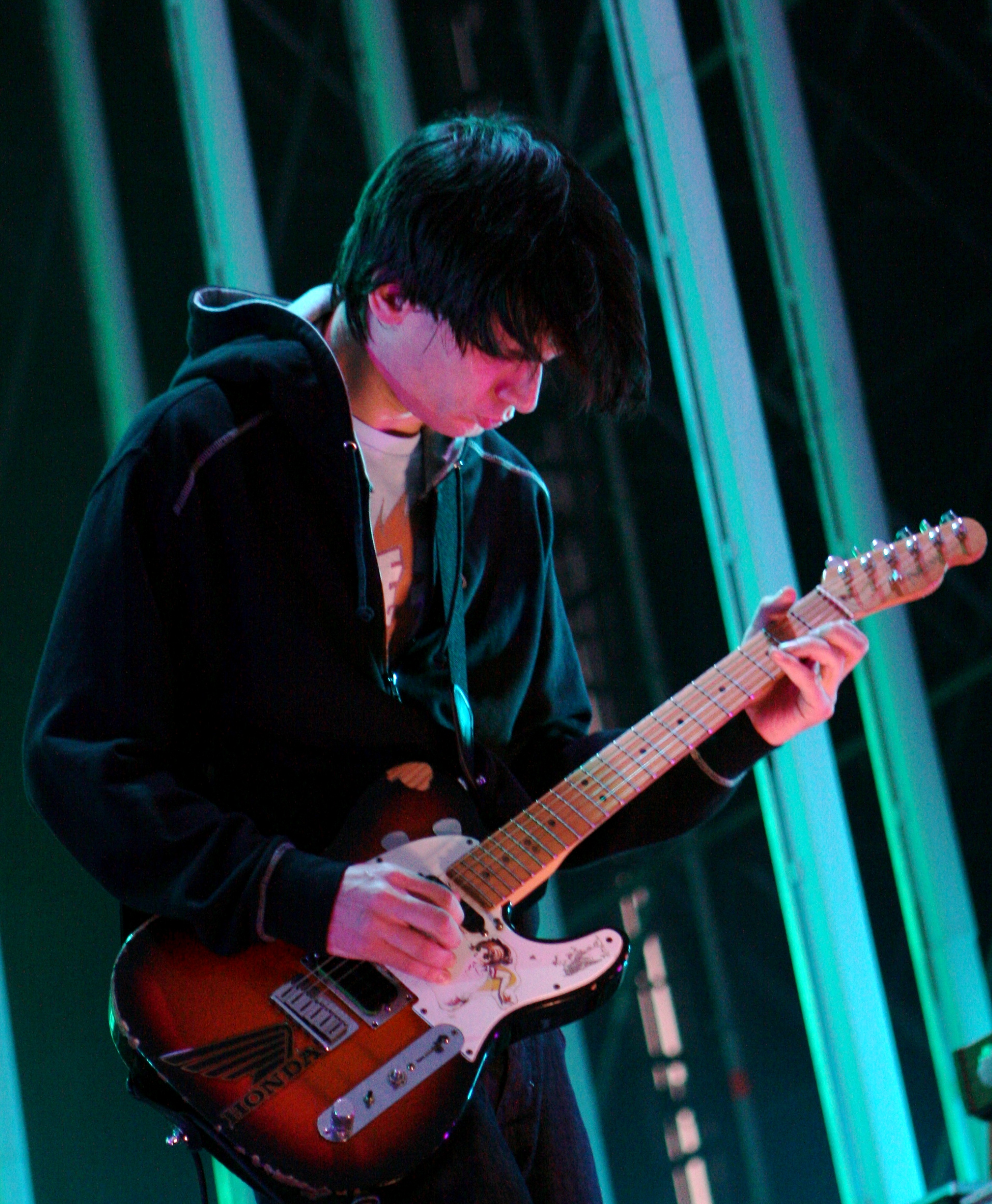
Jonny Greenwood, the Critics' Choice Award-nominated composer of The Master.

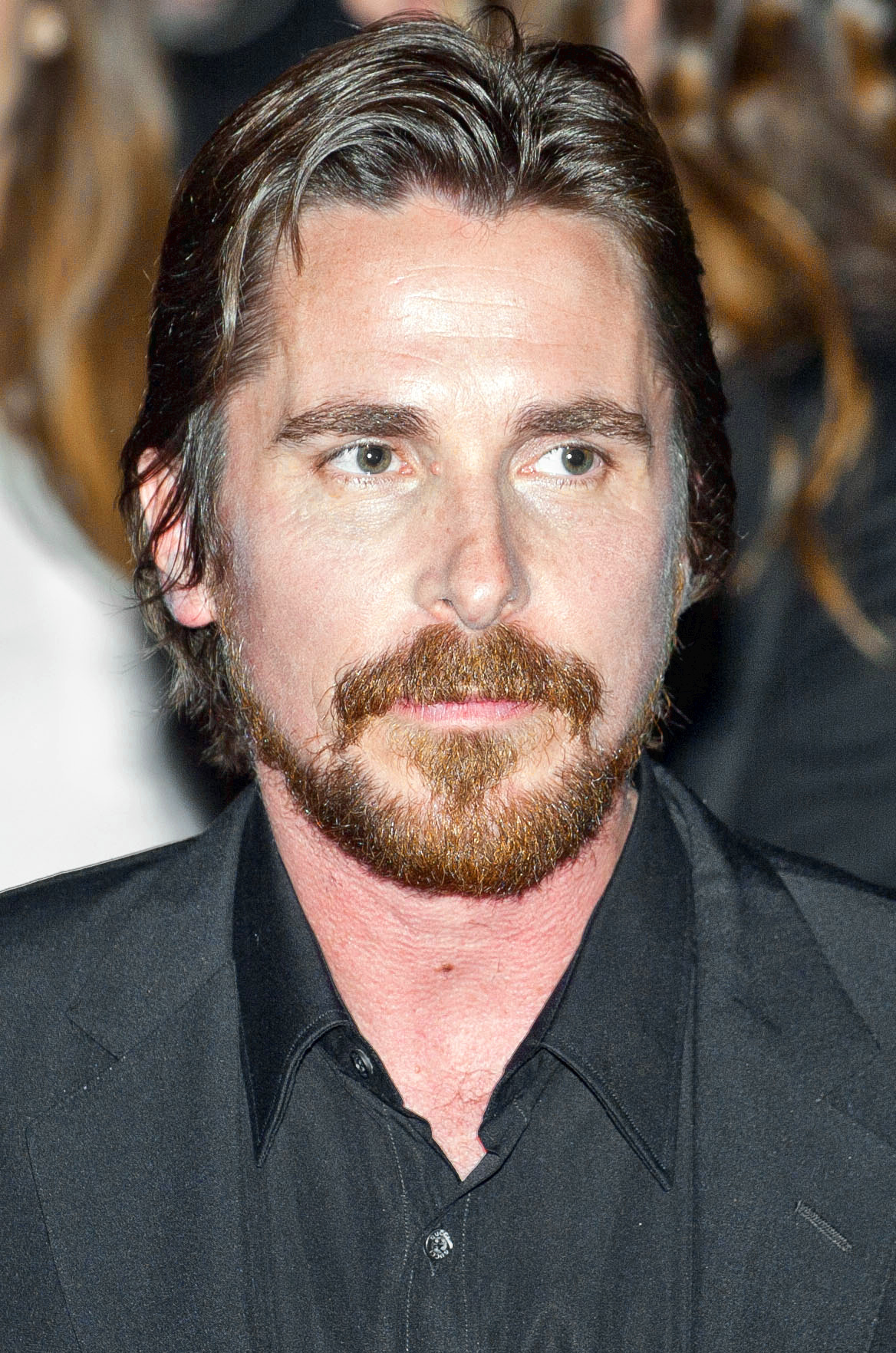
Christian Bale, the Critics' Choice Award-nominated star of The Dark Knight Rises.

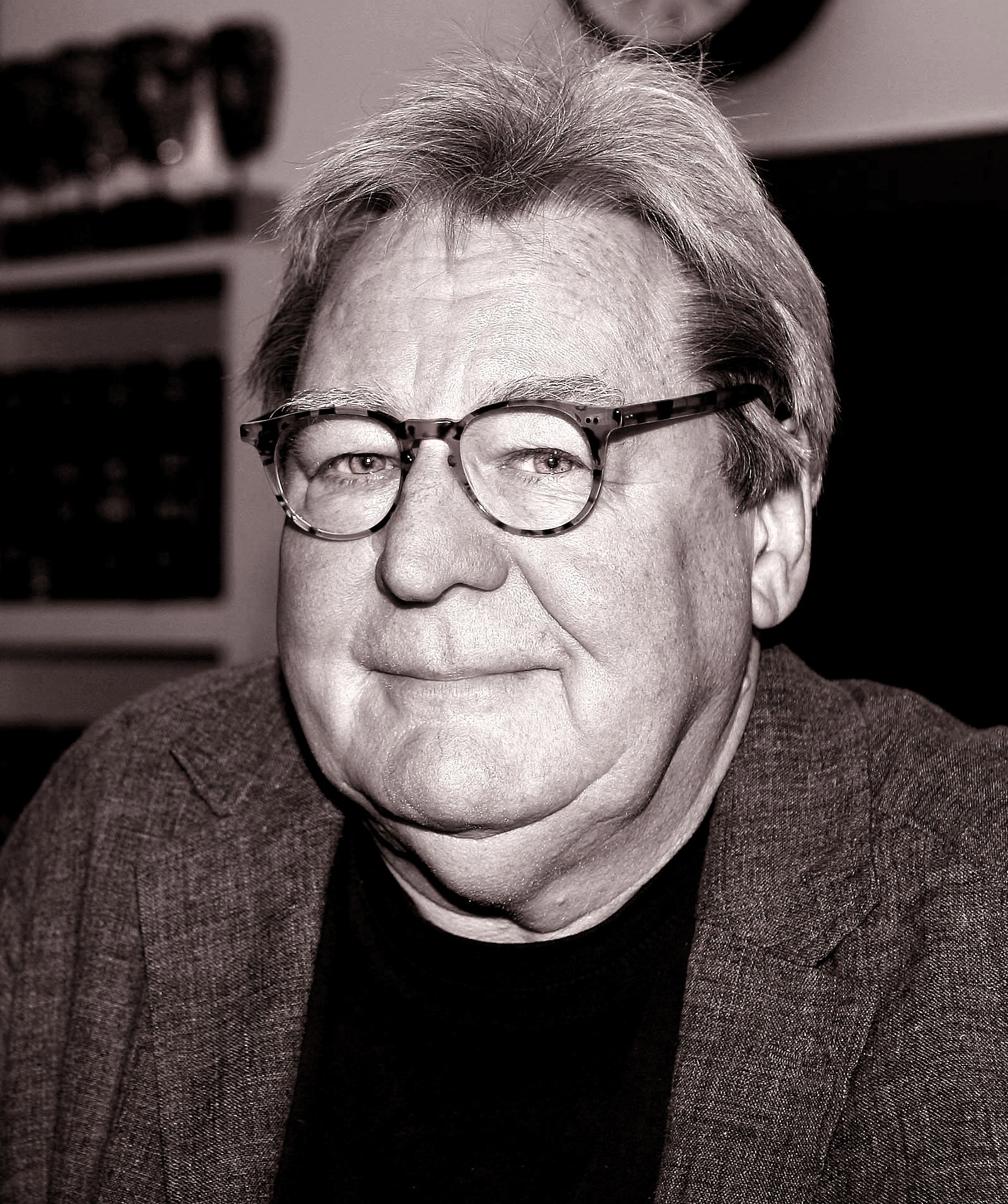
Sir Alan Parker won the British Academy Fellowship Award.

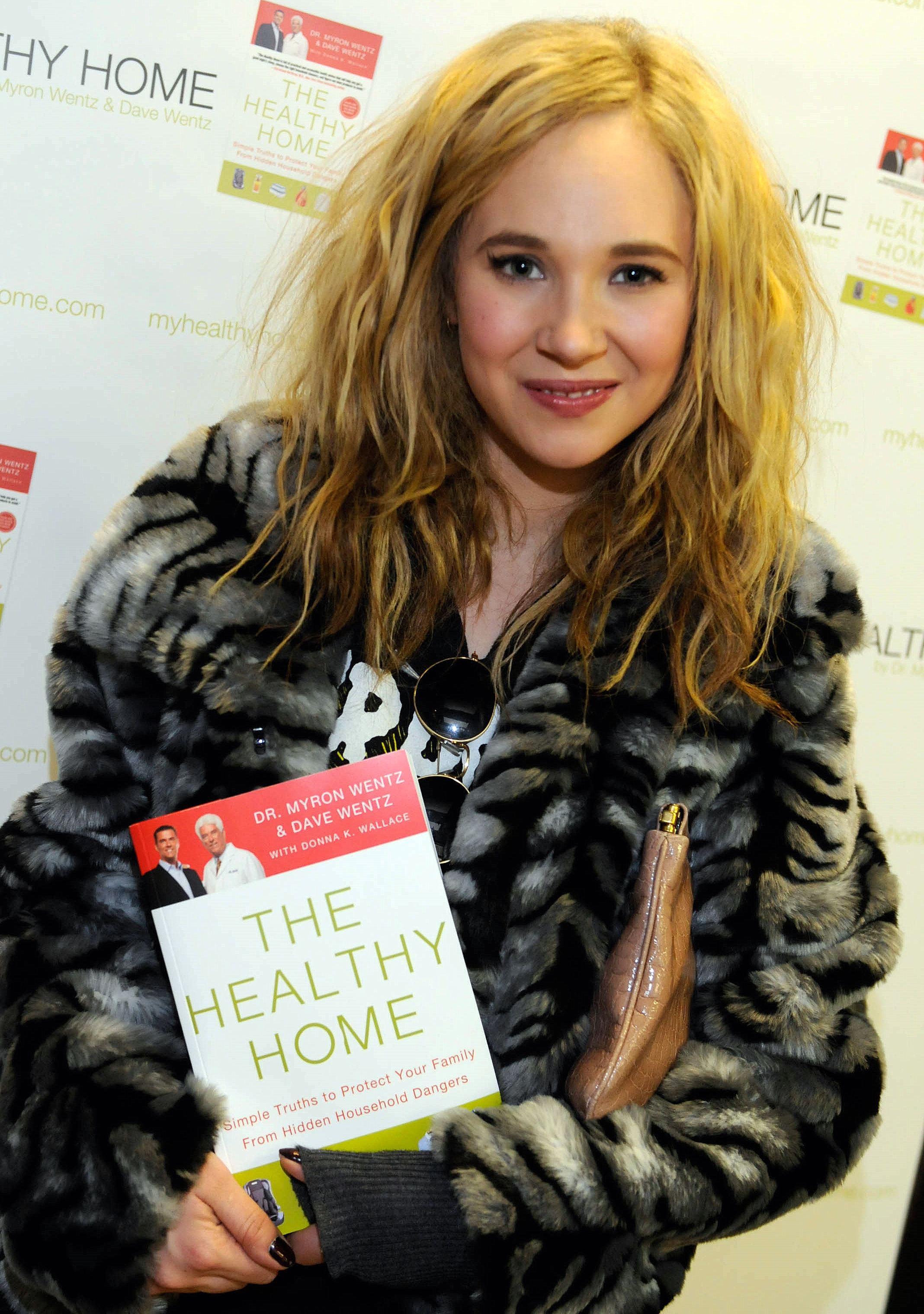
Juno Temple won the EE Rising Star Award.

Listed here are the British winners and nominees at the five most prestigious film award ceremonies in the English-speaking world: the Academy Awards, British Academy Film Awards, Critics' Choice Awards, Golden Globe Awards and Screen Actors Guild Awards, that were held during 2013, celebrating the best films of 2012. The British nominations were led by Skyfall, Life of Pi, Les Misérables and The Best Exotic Marigold Hotel, the first three of which went on to receive large numbers of technical awards. In terms of main awards categories, Daniel Day-Lewis won many for the American film Lincoln and the Americans Ang Lee and Anne Hathaway won for Life of Pi and Les Misérables respectively. They did, however, notably lose out to Argo and Django Unchained (both from the United States).

=== Academy Awards ===
The 85th Academy Awards honouring the best films of 2012 were held on 24 February 2013.

British winners:

- Anna Karenina (Best Costume Design)
- Les Misérables (Best Supporting Actress, Best Makeup and Hairstyling, Best Sound Mixing)
- Life of Pi (Best Directing, Best Original Score, Best Cinematography, Best Visual Effects)
- Searching for Sugar Man (Best Documentary – Feature)
- Skyfall (Best Original Song, Best Sound Editing)
- Adele Adkins (Best Original Song) – Skyfall
- Andy Nelson (Best Sound Mixing) – Les Misérables
- Daniel Day-Lewis (Best Actor) – Lincoln
- Jacqueline Durran (Best Costume Design) – Anna Karenina
- Julie Dartnell (Best Makeup and Hairstyling) – Les Misérables
- Lisa Westcott (Best Makeup and Hairstyling) – Les Misérables
- Mark Paterson (Best Sound Mixing) – Les Misérables
- Paul Epworth (Best Original Song) – Skyfall
- Simon Chinn (Best Documentary – Feature) – Searching for Sugar Man
- Simon Hayes (Best Sound Mixing) – Les Misérables

British nominations:

- Anna Karenina (Best Production Design, Best Cinematography)
- Head over Heels (Best Animated Short Film)
- Hitchcock (Best Makeup and Hairstyling)
- Kon-Tiki (Best Foreign Language Film)
- Les Misérables (Best Picture, Best Actor, Best Original Song, Best Production Design, Best Costume Design)
- Life of Pi (Best Picture, Best Adapted Screenplay, Best Original Song, Best Production Design, Best Sound Editing, Best Sound Mixing, Best Film Editing)
- Prometheus (Best Visual Effects)
- Skyfall (Best Original Score, Best Cinematography, Best Sound Mixing)
- Snow White and the Huntsman (Best Costume Design, Best Visual Effects)
- The Pirates! In an Adventure with Scientists! (Best Animated Feature)
- Eve Stewart (Best Production Design) – Les Misérables
- Herbert Kretzmer (Best Original Song) – Life of Pi
- Joanna Johnston (Best Costume Design) – Lincoln
- Naomi Watts (Best Actress) – The Impossible
- Neil Corbould (Best Visual Effects) – Snow White and the Huntsman
- Peter King (Best Makeup and Hairstyling) – The Hobbit: An Unexpected Journey
- Peter Lord (Best Animated Feature) – ParaNorman
- Roger Deakins (Best Cinematography) – Skyfall
- Sam Fell (Best Animated Feature) – The Pirates! In an Adventure with Scientists!
- Seamus McGarvey (Best Cinematography) – Anna Karenina

=== British Academy Film Awards ===
The 66th British Academy Film Awards were held on 16 February 2013.

British winners:

- Anna Karenina (Best Costume Design)
- Les Misérables (Best Actress in a Supporting Role, Best Sound, Best Production Design, Best Makeup and Hair)
- Life of Pi (Best Cinematography, Best Special Visual Effects)
- Searching for Sugar Man (Best Documentary)
- Skyfall (Outstanding British Film, Best Original Music)
- The Imposter (Outstanding Debut by a British Writer, Director or Producer)
- Alan Parker (Academy Fellowship)
- Bart Layton (Outstanding Debut by a British Writer, Director or Producer) The Imposter
- Daniel Day-Lewis (Best Actor in a Leading Role) – Lincoln
- Dmitri Doganis (Outstanding Debut by a British Writer, Director or Producer) The Imposter
- Juno Temple (EE Rising Star Award)
- Michael Palin (Academy Fellowship)
- Tessa Ross (Outstanding British Contribution to Cinema)

British nominations:

- Anna Karenina (Best Cinematography, Outstanding British Film, Best Original Music, Best Production Design, Best Makeup and Hair)
- Great Expectations (Best Costume Design)
- Hitchcock (Best Actress in a Leading Role, Best Makeup and Hair)
- I Am Nasrine (Outstanding Debut by a British Writer, Director or Producer)
- Les Misérables (Best Film, Best Actor in a Leading Role, Best Cinematography, Outstanding British Film, Best Costume Design)
- Life of Pi (Best Film, Best Director, Best Adapted Screenplay, Best Original Music, Best Sound, Best Production Design, Best Editing)
- Marley (Best Documentary)
- McCullin (Outstanding Debut by a British Writer, Director or Producer, Best Documentary)
- Prometheus (Best Special Visual Effects)
- Seven Psychopaths (Outstanding British Film)
- Skyfall (Best Actor in a Supporting Role, Best Actress in a Supporting Role, Best Cinematography, Best Sound, Best Production Design, Best Editing)
- Snow White and the Huntsman (Best Costume Design)
- The Best Exotic Marigold Hotel (Outstanding British Film)
- The Dark Knight Rises (Best Special Visual Effects)
- The Imposter (Best Documentary)
- Wild Bill (Outstanding Debut by a British Writer, Director or Producer)
- Andrea Riseborough (EE Rising Star Award)
- Danny King (Outstanding Debut by a British Writer, Director or Producer) – Wild Bill
- David Morris (Outstanding Debut by a British Writer, Director or Producer) – McCullin
- Dexter Fletcher (Outstanding Debut by a British Writer, Director or Producer) – Wild Bill
- Helen Mirren (Best Actress in a Leading Role) – Hitchcock
- Jaqui Morris (Outstanding Debut by a British Writer, Director or Producer) – McCullin
- James Bobin (Outstanding Debut by a British Writer, Director or Producer) – The Muppets
- Judi Dench (Best Actress in a Supporting Role) – Skyfall
- Tina Gharavi (Outstanding Debut by a British Writer, Director or Producer) – I Am Nasrine

=== Critics' Choice Awards ===
The 18th Critics' Choice Awards were held on 10 January 2013.

British winners:

- Anna Karenina (Best Art Direction, Best Costume Design)
- Les Misérables (Best Supporting Actress)
- Life of Pi (Best Cinematography, Best Visual Effects)
- Searching for Sugar Man (Best Documentary Feature)
- Skyfall (Best Action Movie, Best Actor in an Action Movie, Best Song)
- Adele Adkins (Best Song) – Skyfall
- Daniel Craig (Best Actor in an Action Movie) – Skyfall
- Daniel Day-Lewis (Best Actor) – Lincoln
- Jacqueline Durran (Best Costume Design) – Anna Karenina
- Paul Epworth (Best Song) – Skyfall

British nominations:

- Ginger & Rosa (Best Young Actor/Actress)
- Les Misérables (Best Picture, Best Director, Best Actor, Best Acting Ensemble, Best Art Direction, Best Cinematography, Best Costume Design, Best Editing, Best Makeup, Best Song)
- Life of Pi (Best Picture, Best Director, Best Young Actor/Actress, Best Adapted Screenplay, Best Art Direction, Best Editing, Best Score)
- Prometheus (Best Sci-Fi/Horror Movie)
- Skyfall (Best Supporting Actor, Best Supporting Actress, Best Actress in an Action Movie, Best Cinematography)
- The Best Exotic Marigold Hotel (Best Acting Ensemble)
- The Dark Knight Rises (Best Action Movie, Best Actor in an Action Movie, Best Actress in an Action Movie, Best Visual Effects)
- The Imposter (Best Documentary Feature)
- Ben Lovett (Best Song) – Brave
- Chris Dickens (Best Editing) – Les Misérables
- Christian Bale (Best Actor in an Action Movie) – The Dark Knight Rises
- Danny Cohen (Best Cinematography) – Les Misérables
- Eve Stewart (Best Art Direction) – Les Misérables
- Herbert Kretzmer (Best Song) – Les Misérables
- Jasmine van den Bogaerde (Best Song) – Brave
- Joanna Johnston (Best Costume Design) – Lincoln
- Jonny Greenwood (Best Score) – The Master
- Judi Dench (Best Supporting Actress, Best Actress in an Action Movie) – Skyfall
- Marcus Mumford (Best Song) – Brave
- Naomi Watts (Best Actress) – The Impossible
- Roger Deakins (Best Cinematography) – Skyfall
- Ted Dwane (Best Song) – Brave
- Tom Holland (Best Young Actor/Actress) – The Impossible
- Tom Hooper (Best Director) – Les Misérables
- Winston Marshall (Best Song) – Brave

=== Golden Globe Awards ===
The 70th Golden Globe Awards were held on 13 January 2013.

British winners:

- Les Misérables (Best Motion Picture – Musical or Comedy, Best Actor – Motion Picture Musical or Comedy, Best Supporting Actress)
- Life of Pi (Best Original Score)
- Skyfall (Best Original Song)
- Adele Adkins (Best Original Song) – Skyfall
- Daniel Day-Lewis (Best Actor – Motion Picture Drama) – Lincoln
- Paul Epworth (Best Original Song) – Skyfall

British nominations:

- Anna Karenina (Best Original Score)
- Hitchcock (Best Actress – Motion Picture Drama)
- Hyde Park on Hudson (Best Actor – Motion Picture Musical or Comedy)
- Kon-Tiki (Best Foreign Language Film)
- Les Misérables (Best Original Song)
- Life of Pi (Best Motion Picture – Drama, Best Director)
- Quartet (Best Actress – Motion Picture Musical or Comedy)
- Salmon Fishing in the Yemen (Best Motion Picture – Musical or Comedy, Best Actor – Motion Picture Musical or Comedy, Best Actress – Motion Picture Musical or Comedy)
- The Best Exotic Marigold Hotel (Best Motion Picture – Musical or Comedy, Best Actress – Motion Picture Musical or Comedy)
- The Deep Blue Sea (Best Actress – Motion Picture Drama)
- Emily Blunt (Best Actress – Motion Picture Musical or Comedy) – Salmon Fishing in the Yemen
- Ewan McGregor (Best Actor – Motion Picture Musical or Comedy) – Salmon Fishing in the Yemen
- Helen Mirren (Best Actress – Motion Picture Drama) – Hitchcock
- Judi Dench (Best Actress – Motion Picture Musical or Comedy) – The Best Exotic Marigold Hotel
- Maggie Smith (Best Actress – Motion Picture Musical or Comedy) – Quartet
- Naomi Watts (Best Actress – Motion Picture Drama) – The Impossible
- Rachel Weisz (Best Actress – Motion Picture Drama) – The Deep Blue Sea

=== Screen Actors Guild Awards ===
The 19th Screen Actors Guild Awards were held on 27 January 2013.

British winners:

- Les Misérables (Outstanding Performance by a Female Actor in a Supporting Role)
- Skyfall (Outstanding Performance by a Stunt Ensemble in a Motion Picture)
- Daniel Day-Lewis (Outstanding Performance by a Male Actor in a Leading Role) – Lincoln

British nominations:

- Hitchcock (Outstanding Performance by a Female Actor in a Leading Role)
- Les Misérables (Outstanding Performance by a Male Actor in a Leading Role, Outstanding Performance by a Cast in a Motion Picture, Outstanding Performance by a Stunt Ensemble in a Motion Picture)
- Skyfall (Outstanding Performance by a Male Actor in a Supporting Role)
- The Best Exotic Marigold Hotel (Outstanding Performance by a Female Actor in a Supporting Role, Outstanding Performance by a Cast in a Motion Picture)
- The Dark Knight Rises (Outstanding Performance by a Stunt Ensemble in a Motion Picture)
- Bill Nighy (Outstanding Performance by a Cast in a Motion Picture) – The Best Exotic Marigold Hotel
- Celia Imrie (Outstanding Performance by a Cast in a Motion Picture) – The Best Exotic Marigold Hotel
- Daniel Day-Lewis (Outstanding Performance by a Cast in a Motion Picture) – Lincoln
- Dev Patel (Outstanding Performance by a Cast in a Motion Picture) – The Best Exotic Marigold Hotel
- Eddie Redmayne (Outstanding Performance by a Cast in a Motion Picture) – Les Misérables
- Helena Bonham Carter (Outstanding Performance by a Cast in a Motion Picture) – Les Misérables
- Helen Mirren (Outstanding Performance by a Female Actor in a Leading Role) – Hitchcock
- Isabelle Allen (Outstanding Performance by a Cast in a Motion Picture) – Les Misérables
- Judi Dench (Outstanding Performance by a Cast in a Motion Picture) – The Best Exotic Marigold Hotel
- Maggie Smith (Outstanding Performance by a Female Actor in a Supporting Role, Outstanding Performance by a Cast in a Motion Picture) – The Best Exotic Marigold Hotel
- Naomi Watts (Outstanding Performance by a Female Actor in a Leading Role) – The Impossible
- Ronald Pickup (Outstanding Performance by a Cast in a Motion Picture) – The Best Exotic Marigold Hotel
- Sacha Baron Cohen (Outstanding Performance by a Cast in a Motion Picture) – Les Misérables
- Samantha Barks (Outstanding Performance by a Cast in a Motion Picture) – Les Misérables
- Tom Wilkinson (Outstanding Performance by a Cast in a Motion Picture) – The Best Exotic Marigold Hotel
- Penelope Wilton (Outstanding Performance by a Cast in a Motion Picture) – The Best Exotic Marigold Hotel

== Notable deaths ==
Month	Date	Name	Age	Nationality	Profession	Notable films
January	21	Michael Winner	77	English	Director, producer	Death Wish films; The Mechanic
January	28	Keith Marsh	86	English	Actor	Daleks – Invasion Earth: 2150 A.D.; Taste the Blood of Dracula; Scrooge
January	29	Bernard Horsfall	82	English	Actor	Braveheart; Gandhi
February	1	Robin Sachs	62	English	Actor	The Lost World: Jurassic Park; Ocean's Eleven
February	3	Peter Gilmore	81	German-English	Actor	Carry On; Warlords of Atlantis
February	5	Stuart Freeborn	98	English	Make-up artist	Star Wars; Superman
February	5	Gerry Hambling	86	English	Film editor	Pink Floyd – The Wall; Fame
February	8	Alan Sharp	79	Scottish-American	Screenwriter	The Hired Hand; Ulzana's Raid
February	11	Rick Huxley	72	English	Actor	Catch Us If You Can; Pit of Darkness
February	17	Richard Briers	79	English	Actor	Peter Pan; Spice World
February	18	Elspet Gray	83	Scottish	Actress	Four Weddings and a Funeral; Goodbye, Mr. Chips
February	21	Bob Godfrey	91	Australian-English	Animator, actor	Great; The Road to Hong Kong
March	1	Pat Keen	79	English	Actress	Fierce Creatures; Clockwise
March	7	Kenny Ball	82	English	Actor	Live It Up!; It's Trad, Dad!
March	7	Sybil Christopher	83	Welsh-American	Actress	The Last Days of Dolwyn; Kitty
March	15	Terry Lightfoot	77	English	Actor, arranger	Plenty; It's Trad, Dad!
March	16	Frank Thornton	92	English	Actor	Are You Being Served?; The Three Musketeers
March	20	Jack Stokes	92	English	Animator	Yellow Submarine; The Princess and the Goblin
March	28	Richard Griffiths	65	English	Actor	Harry Potter; Pirates of the Caribbean: On Stranger Tides
March	30	Brian Ackland-Snow	72	English	Production designer, art director	A Room with a View; Superman III
March	31	Helena Carroll	84	Scottish-American	Actress	Rocky V; The Friends of Eddie Coyle
April	8	Richard Brooker	58	English	Actor, stuntman	Friday the 13th Part III; Deathstalker
April	8	Greg Kramer	51	English-Canadian	Actor	The Day After Tomorrow; 300
April	15	Richard LeParmentier	66	American-English	Actor	Star Wars Episode IV: A New Hope; Who Framed Roger Rabbit
April	20	Nosher Powell	84	English	Actor, stuntman	James Bond films; Carry On
April	23	Norman Jones	80	English	Actor	Oh! What a Lovely War; You Only Live Twice
April	25	Johnny Lockwood	92	English-Australian	Actor	Moulin Rouge!; The Rage in Placid Lake
May	7	Aubrey Woods	85	English	Actor, singer	Willy Wonka & the Chocolate Factory; Cloak & Dagger
May	8	Bryan Forbes	86	English	Director, screenwriter, actor	The Stepford Wives; The League of Gentlemen
May	18	Arthur Malet	85	English-American	Actor, singer	Mary Poppins; Halloween
May	22	Richard Thorp	81	English	Actor	The Dam Busters; The Barretts of Wimpole Street
May	27	Bill Pertwee	86	English	Actor	Dad's Army; Carry On
June	5	Katherine Woodville	74	English-American	Actress	Posse; The Informers
June	7	David Lyon	72	English	Actor	Greenfingers; Defence of the Realm
June	8	Angus MacKay	86	English	Actor	National Lampoon's European Vacation; King Ralph
June	17	Michael Goldie	81	English	Actor	Robin Hood: Prince of Thieves; The Horror of Frankenstein
June	20	John David Wilson	93	English	Animator, director, producer	Peter Pan; Lady and the Tramp
June	21	Diane Clare	74	English	Actress	Ice Cold in Alex; Indiscreet
June	23	Darryl Read	61	English	Actor, singer	The Lost Continent; Great Catherine
June	25	Mark Fisher	66	English	Set designer	Shine a Light; Stones at the Max
July	3	Snoo Wilson	64	English	Screenwriter	Eichmann; Shadey
July	7	Anna Wing	98	English	Actress	The Hound of the Baskervilles; Providence
July	10	Paul Bhattacharjee	53	English	Actor	Casino Royale; The Best Exotic Marigold Hotel
July	12	Alan Whicker	87	Egyptian-English	Actor	The Magic Christian; The Angry Silence
July	17	Briony McRoberts	56	English	Actress	The Pink Panther Strikes Again; Edge of Sanity
July	19	Mel Smith	60	English	Actor, director, screenwriter	The Princess Bride; National Lampoon's European Vacation
July	20	David Spenser	79	Sri Lankan-English	Actor	Carry On... Up the Khyber; In Search of the Castaways
July	23	Rona Anderson	86	Scottish	Actress	Scrooge; The Prime of Miss Jean Brodie
August	6	Jeremy Geidt	83	English-American	Actor	Next Stop Wonderland; The Spanish Prisoner
August	19	Stephenie McMillan	71	English	Set decorator	Harry Potter; The English Patient
August	23	Gilbert Taylor	99	English	Cinematographer	Star Wars Episode IV: A New Hope; The Omen
September	2	David Jacobs	87	English	Actor	Stardust; It's Trad, Dad!
September	2	Olga Lowe	93	South African-English	Actress	Carry On Abroad; Steptoe and Son Ride Again
September	6	Bill Wallis	76	English	Actor	The Other Boleyn Girl; Son of the Pink Panther
September	23	Annette Kerr	93	English	Actress	The Private Life of Sherlock Holmes; Doppelgänger
September	30	Anthony Hinds	91	English	Screenwriter, producer	The Phantom of the Opera; The Quatermass Xperiment
October	6	Paul Rogers	96	English	Actor	A Midsummer Night's Dream; The Trials of Oscar Wilde
October	13	John Barrard	89	South African-English	Actor	Santa Claus: The Movie; Buster
October	19	Noel Harrison	79	English	Actor, singer	Hot Enough for June; The Best of Enemies
October	24	Antonia Bird	62	English	Director	Ravenous; Mad Love
October	25	Nigel Davenport	85	English	Actor	Without a Clue; Greystoke: The Legend of Tarzan, Lord of the Apes
October	29	Graham Stark	91	English	Actor	The Pink Panther; Alfie
November	27	Lewis Collins	67	English-American	Actor	Who Dares Wins; Confessions of a Driving Instructor
November	30	Jean Kent	92	English	Actress	The Prince and the Showgirl; The Woman in Question
December	5	Barry Jackson	75	English	Actor	Aces High; Barry Lyndon
December	8	Edward Williams	92	English	Composer	Unearthly Stranger; Doublecross
December	14	Peter O'Toole	81	Irish-English	Actor	Lawrence of Arabia; Troy
December	26	Harold Whitaker	93	English	Animator	Animal Farm; Heavy Metal
December	31	John Fortune	74	English	Actor	Saving Grace; Match Point

== See also ==
- 2013 in film
- 2013 in British music
- 2013 in British radio
- 2013 in British television
- 2013 in the United Kingdom
- List of 2013 box office number-one films in the United Kingdom
- List of British films of 2012
- List of British films of 2014
