= Third Row Centre =

- Directed by: Lloyd Handley
- Screenplay by: Lloyd Handley
- Produced by: Sarah West
- Starring: Guy Hescott; Ava Lyn Koh; Eilidh Nairn; Katy Withers; Norman Yourell
- Music by: Kick Up the Fire
- Production company: Single Hand Films
- Release date: February 18, 2014 (Hollywood Reel)
- Running time: 90 minutes
- Country: United Kingdom
- Language: English

Third Row Centre is a 2014 film written and directed by Lloyd Handley. Shot on a micro-budget, the film went on to win the Best Feature Film award at the 2014 Madrid International Film Festival

== Premise ==
Disheartened by a dull job and a repetitive life, a lonely telephone operator discovers a new voyeuristic obsession.
