= Lloyd Handley =

British screenwriter and film director

- Born: 17 January 1987 (age 38); Wrexham, Wales, United Kingdom
- Occupation(s): Screenwriter, film Director

Lloyd Handley is a Welsh screenwriter and film director. His feature film Third Row Centre won the Best Feature Film award at the 2014 Madrid International Film Festival.
