= In Secret (film) =

- Theatrical release poster
- Directed by: Charlie Stratton
- Written by: Charlie Stratton
- Based on: Thérèse Raquin by Émile Zola
- Produced by: Mickey Liddell; Pete Shilaimon; William Horberg
- Starring: Elizabeth Olsen; Tom Felton; Oscar Isaac; Jessica Lange
- Cinematography: Florian Hoffmeister
- Edited by: Celia Haining; Leslie Jones; Paul Tothill
- Music by: Gabriel Yared
- Production companies: Exclusive Media Group; LD Entertainment
- Distributed by: Roadside Attractions
- Release dates: September 7, 2013 (TIFF); February 21, 2014 (United States)
- Running time: 107 minutes
- Country: United States
- Language: English
- Box office: $1.4 million

In Secret (also known as Thérèse) is a 2013 American erotic thriller romance film written and directed by Charlie Stratton. Based on Émile Zola's classic 1867 novel Thérèse Raquin and the 2009 stage play by the same name penned by Neal Bell, the film stars Elizabeth Olsen, Tom Felton, Oscar Isaac and Jessica Lange. It was screened in the Special Presentation section at the 2013 Toronto International Film Festival. The film received a regional release on February 21, 2014.

== Plot ==
In the lower echelons of Parisian society in the 1860's, Thérèse Raquin is a beautiful, sexually repressed young woman trapped in a loveless marriage to her sickly cousin, Camille, whom she was forced to marry by her domineering aunt, Madame Raquin.

Thérèse spends her days confined behind the counter of a small shop and her evenings watching Madame Raquin play dominoes with an eclectic group of acquaintances. After she meets her husband's alluring friend Laurent LeClaire, the two embark on an illicit affair that leads to tragic consequences.

During an outing on the lake with Laurent and Therese, Camille is beaten to death by Laurent and subsequently drowns. Madame Raquin finds it difficult to come to terms with her son's death and is soon incapacitated by a stroke, but overhears Laurent and Therese speaking about what they did. With great effort, she alerts one of their friends, who informs the authorities.

To escape being assumedly sentenced for the murder, Laurent and Therese choose to take their own lives. They share one final kiss after drinking poison mixed with champagne, and thus they die in front of Madame Raquin by the river.

== Cast ==
- Elizabeth Olsen as Thérèse Raquin
  - Lily Laight as young Thérèse
- Tom Felton as Camille Raquin, Thérèse's husband and first cousin.
  - Dimitrije Bogdanov as young Camille
- Oscar Isaac as Laurent LeClaire, a childhood friend and co-worker of Camille who seduces his wife, Thérèse.
- Jessica Lange as Madame Raquin, Camille's mother and Thérèse's aunt.
- Matt Lucas as Olivier
- Shirley Henderson as Suzanne
- Mackenzie Crook as Grivet
- John Kavanagh as Inspector Michaud

== Production ==
=== Filming ===
On May 9, 2012, principal photography began in Belgrade, Serbia and Budapest, Hungary.

== Reception ==
In Secret received mixed reviews. On review aggregation website Rotten Tomatoes, the film holds a 41% approval rating, with an average score of 5.30/10, based on reviews from 87 critics. The consensus states: "Although it benefits from a strong cast, In Secret's stars can't totally compensate for the movie's sodden pacing and overly familiar story." Metacritic, which uses a weighted average, assigned the film a score of 47 out of 100, based on 32 critics, indicating "mixed or average" reviews.

Despite mixed reviews, Lange's performance has received critical acclaim. David Lee Dallas from Slant Magazine called Lange's character's "latent severity dangerous and surprising." Michael O'Sullivan from The Washington Post noted that "Subtlety may not be this film's strong suit, but it certainly is Lange's." Jessica Herdon of the Associated Press added that Lange "[goes] from agonized to helpless, so poignantly that your heart breaks for her." Odie Henderson praised Lange on her ability to "...[find] the perfect line of lunacy to toe, which In Secret requires for her character's arc..." Emma Myers from Film Comment described her ability to "[maintain] a looming presence that shifts from despicable to sympathetic and back again." USA Today described her work as her "...most fully dimensional performance." Variety mentioned that Lange "...relishes what becomes the most dramatically potent role." Joshua Rothkopf from Time Out New York praised the chemistry between Olsen and Isaac.
