= Lily Laight =

British actress

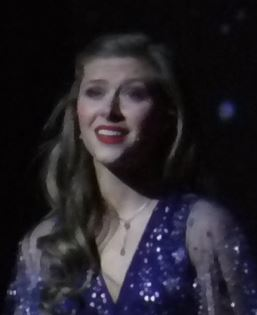
- Laight in 2019
- Born: Lily May Laight; 22 December 2001 (age 24); Devon, England
- Occupations: Actress, singer, dancer
- Years active: 2008–present

Lily May Laight (born 22 December 2001) is an English actress, singer, dancer from Devon. Laight is known for acting in Love, Rosie, In Secret and Frequencies.

== Career ==
Laight comes from a theatrical family and made her stage debut at the age of two. She first appeared at the Babbacombe theatre, Torquay as part of the supporting act Kidz Aloud troupe aged 7. Following her success in the "Torbay's Got Talent" contest at age 8 she appeared as a soloist at the Babbacombe theatre for their "Christmas Laughter Party". Appearances in London theatre, television, and film have followed.

Laight appeared in a new production of Hairspray at London's Coliseum Theatre 21 June 2021 for a limited run starring alongside Michael Ball and Paul Merton.

Lily returned to the West End in 2022 when she appeared at the Dominion Theatre in Dirty Dancing.

== Personal life ==
Laight's mother is a retired professional dancer. Rebecca Laight is choreographer for the 2019 production Wonderful Christmastime. Laight's father is Ellis Laight who was a professional football player with Torquay United and numerous non-league sides including Dorchester, Taunton, Biddeford, and Buckland Athletic, becoming the manager of Buckland until 2017 when he resigned.

== Filmography ==
=== Film and television ===
Year	Title	Role	Notes
2012	Comic Strip Presents	Young Anne	Episode: "Five Go to Rehab"
2012	Les Misérables	Turning girl	Uncredited
2013	In Secret	Young Thérèse Raquin	
2013	Doc Martin	Becky Wead	Episode: "The Tameness of the Wolf"
2013	Frequencies	Marie as a child	
2014	Love, Rosie	Katie Dunne	

=== Theatre ===
Year	Production	Role	Theatre	Notes
2011	Matilda the Musical	Amanda Thripp	Cambridge Theatre	West End November 2011 – April 2012
2013	The Sound of Music	Louisa Von Trapp	Regents Open Air Theatre	July – September 2013
2013	West End Encore	various	Babbacombe Theatre	Songs from West End musicals in London and dance accompaniments.
2014	West End Now	various	Babbacombe Theatre	Songs from West End musicals in London and dance accompaniments.
2014	Once Upon a Christmas	various	Babbacombe Theatre	November–December. Songs and dance accompaniments.
2015	The Music of the Night	various	Babbacombe Theatre	Thursdays April–October. Songs and dance accompaniments.
2015	Christmas House Party	various	Babbacombe Theatre	Wednesdays November–December. Songs and dance routines.
2016	The Music of the Night	various	Babbacombe Theatre	Thursdays April–October. Songs and dance accompaniments.
2016	The Magic of Christmas	various	Babbacombe Theatre	Wednesdays November–December. Songs and dance routines.
2017	Legends of the West End	various	Babbacombe Theatre	Thursdays April–September. Songs and dance routines.
2017	Christmas is Magical	various	Babbacombe Theatre	Wednesdays November–December. Songs and dance routines.
2018	West End at the Movie	various	Babbacombe Theatre	Thursdays May–October. Songs and dance routines
2018–19	Christmas Crackers	various	Babbacombe Theatre	Varied days end October, beginning January. Songs and dance routines
2019	I ♥ Music	various	Babbacombe Theatre	Thursdays May–October. Songs and dance routines
2019–20	Wonderful Christmastime	various	Babbacombe Theatre	Wednesdays end September, beginning January. Songs and dance routines
2021	Hairspray	Lou-Ann/First Cover Amber	London Coliseum	April–September
2022	Gypsy	Young Louise/Ensemble	Alexandra Palace	February
