= Popcorn (2007 film) =

- British theatrical release poster
- Directed by: Darren Paul Fisher
- Written by: Darren Paul Fisher
- Produced by: Daniel M. San; Rebecca Knapp
- Starring: Jack Ryder; Jodi Albert; Kate Maberly
- Music by: Paul Leonard-Morgan
- Distributed by: Moviehouse Entertainment
- Release date: 2 March 2007
- Running time: 90 minutes
- Country: United Kingdom
- Language: English

Popcorn is a 2007 British romantic comedy film written and directed by Darren Paul Fisher. It was filmed in 2005 at one of London's largest multiplex cinemas, Odeon Greenwich formally the UCI Filmworks.

== Plot ==
Too insecure to approach the girl of his dreams, Danny takes a job at his local movie house where she works, only to learn his first day is her last. After his initial efforts to woo her fail, he resorts to drastic measures by enlisting the help of the chief projectionist, a man who no longer knows the difference between the real and the film worlds.

== Cast ==
- Jack Ryder as Danny
- Jodi Albert as Suki
- Luke de Woolfson as Zak
- Colette Brown as Florence
- Andrew Lee Potts as Kris
- Kate Maberly as Annie
- Laura Aikman as Jeannie
- Layke Anderson as Cool Guy
- Sophie Anderton as Female Killer
- Kacey Barnfield as Yukino Girl
- Chike Chan as Lo

== Soundtrack ==
1. Little Voice - Performed by Mohair
2. Burn It Up - Performed by Hardwire
3. Undertow - Performed by Wade
4. Love Is A Wonderful Thing - Performed by Sarah Lundbeck
5. Dynamite - Performed by China Doll
6. Time To Get It On - Performed by Mista Groove featuring Joneice Jamieson
7. Round And Round - Performed by LJ
8. Thin Air - Performed by Mohair
9. Hypnotised - Performed by Solasso featuring Foster Child
10. Number One Or Zero - Performed by Toffee

== Reviews ==
Matthew Leyland from the BBC gives it two out of five stars, saying that "few of the jokes hit the target" and the "leads were dull." He acknowledges the film's ambition, which uses "slapstick, sight gags, sound gags (movie dialogue finishing characters' sentences) and manga-esque inserts." Anna Smith from Empire Magazine also gave the film a negative review, rating it one out of five. She states that Popcorn is "a well-meaning British comedy that fails to deliver the laughs – or the romance." Paul Newman's blog review pointed to a positive aspect of the film, in that it doesn't follow the typical Hollywood format, but "feels more like an indy comedy."

== Manga style artwork ==
The film makes use of manga-style artwork and comic strips by United Kingdom resident original English-language manga artist Sonia Leong of Sweatdrop Studios. The artwork is used as both posters in one of the character's rooms, and as illustrations in the plot.
