= Daniel Fraser (actor) =

British actor

Daniel Fraser is a British actor. He trained at the Central School of Speech and Drama. He is generally known for playing one of the lead characters in Frequencies (OXV: The Manual), Scar Tissue, The Patrol and Lab Rats. Although a greater part of his acting is done on stage. He also voiced the character of Magnai Oronir in the Stormblood expansion of Final Fantasy XIV.

He is the grandson of actress Pamela Cundell.

== Filmography ==
Year	Title	Role	Notes
2003	Ready When You Are, Mr. McGill	Schoolboy	
2010	Holby City	Tom Matherson	TV series
2010	Lab Rats	Zac	
2012	Doctors	Nicholas Pedrick	TV series
2013	Frequencies (OXV: The Manual)	Zak	
2013	Scar Tissue	Matthew	
2013	The Patrol	Lieutenant Jonathan Bradshaw	
