= Ten (2013 film) =

- Directed by: Craig Wyting
- Written by: Craig Wyting
- Produced by: Darren Cook
- Starring: Colin Vidler, Claire Walmsley, Dan Howard
- Cinematography: Jonathan Kemp
- Edited by: Darren S. Cook
- Music by: Paul Johnson
- Production company: 2 Blokes Films
- Distributed by: Amazon Prime
- Release date: 10 October 2013
- Running time: 118 minutes
- Country: United Kingdom
- Language: English

Ten is a British action drama film, directed and written by Craig Wyting, starring Colin Burt Vidler, Claire Walmsley, Danny Howard. The film was mostly shot at the Hythe area of the town of Colchester. The film is loosely based on the author's experiences as a soldier in the British Army, and examines how society treats former soldiers.

The film was produced by previous winner of the Coup de Coeur at the Cannes Film Festival, Darren Cook of Scruffy Bear Pictures. The cast and crew volunteered their time to work on the production, with any money raised to be split between military charities, the Royal British Legion, the Invicta Foundation and 353.

== Premise ==
The film's plot centers on a Company Sergeant Major who is on his tenth tour, and is about to leave the Army.

== Cast ==
- Colin Burt Vidler as Company Sergeant Major Glenn Knox
- Claire Walmsley as Cassie Read
- Chris Martin Hill as color sergeant fletcher
- Danny Howard as John
- David Jon as Sergeant Morgan
- Mitch Hill as Sergeant Philips
- Kumud Pant as Insurgent

== Release ==
The film was released on the Amazon Prime platform on 1 December 2016.
