= Stranded (2013 film) =

- Theatrical release poster
- Directed by: Roger Christian
- Written by: Roger Christian; Christian Piers Betley
- Produced by: Mark Montague; Isabella Battiston; Kevin DeWalt
- Starring: Christian Slater
- Cinematography: Mark Dobrescu
- Edited by: Daryl Davis
- Music by: Todd Bryanton
- Production companies: Gloucester Place Films; International Pictures Three; Minds Eye Entertainment; Moving Pictures Media
- Distributed by: Image Entertainment
- Release date: 26 July 2013
- Running time: 88 minutes
- Countries: Canada; United Kingdom
- Language: English
- Budget: $1.9 million

Stranded is a 2013 science fiction-horror film directed and co-written by Roger Christian and Christian Piers Betley (writer/producer) starring Christian Slater, Brendan Fehr, Amy Matysio, and Michael Therriault. Astronauts who are stranded on a lunar mining base attempt to survive an attack by shapeshifting alien life forms. Filming was at the Canada Saskatchewan Production Studios by Regina, Saskatchewan based Minds Eye Entertainment. The film was one of the last financed by the province's cancelled film employment tax credit and was produced entirely in Saskatchewan.

== Plot ==
Four isolated astronauts in the lunar mining base Ark suffer a meteor storm. While inspecting the damage caused by the meteors, astronaut Ava Cameron discovers spores contained in one of the fragments and brings them back to the base for investigation.

The medical officer discovers that these spores can grow rapidly, and in the process Ava is contaminated with them. Shortly afterward, Ava shows evident signs of a rapidly progressing pregnancy and, a few hours later, she goes into labour. The life form escapes the lab, and none of the others believe Ava's stories; they instead attribute her pregnancy to a cyst. The alien stalks crew member Johns, eventually taking his shape and killing him. Using notes posthumously left by Johns, Ava and Col. Brauchman attempt to kill the alien before it can kill them. It is discovered that the Johns alien and Ava can sense and locate each other. The Johns alien sabotages the air system, attempting to collapse the air system to kill off the remaining three humans. While attempting to fix the air system, Dr. Krauss is killed when the Johns alien opens an airlock on him. Using Johns's notes that the alien may be easier to kill while human, Ava and Brauchman decide to prep the escape pod and leave the Johns alien to die of the rising carbon monoxide. As the carbon monoxide levels get to 80%, the Johns alien develops growths that enable it to survive. Ava and Brauchman prepare to abandon the base in an escape pod, but it is hijacked by the Johns alien. Brauchman sends a message to Earth from the rescue ship, warning them to kill whatever they discover in the escape pod. Ava and Brauchman, having expended most of the base's remaining power to ready the escape pod, are resigned to their fates. At the moment they accept their fate, a rescue ship arrives from Earth; with their remaining oxygen running out, they choose to run to the rescue shuttle.

The escape pod lands on Earth but it's revealed that the alien has already escaped and it is continuing to evolve.

== Cast ==
- Christian Slater as Col. Gerard Brauchman
- Brendan Fehr as Dr. Lance Krauss
- Amy Matysio as Ava Cameron
- Michael Therriault as Bruce Johns

== Release ==
Stranded was released on 26 July 2013. It was released on home video on 27 August 2013, and made $1,733,694 on US video sales.

== Reception ==
Rotten Tomatoes, a review aggregator, reports that 0% of 15 surveyed critics gave the film a positive review; the average rating was 3/10. Metacritic rated it 27/100 based on 11 reviews. Neil Genzlinger of The New York Times called it "decently made and acted" but too derivative of Alien. Ernest Hardy of The Village Voice called it "more tedious than scary". William Harrison of DVD Talk rated it 2/5 stars and called it "an unremarkable rehash of classic sci-fi movies". Robert Abele of the Los Angeles Times wrote that the film "stops at being merely seriously dull and trite, rather than tipping into train-wreck silliness." Justin Chang of Variety called the film a "blandly competent, thoroughly forgettable low-budget sci-fi thriller assembled from the stray parts of countless other, better movies." John DeFore of The Hollywood Reporter wrote that it "offers neither originality nor thrills."
