= Frequencies (film) =

- Film poster
- Directed by: Darren Paul Fisher
- Written by: Darren Paul Fisher
- Produced by: Darren Paul Fisher
- Starring: Daniel Fraser; Eleanor Wyld
- Cinematography: James Watson
- Edited by: Darren Paul Fisher
- Music by: Blair Mowat
- Production company: Incurably Curious Productions
- Distributed by: FilmBuff
- Release date: 24 July 2013
- Running time: 105 minutes
- Country: United Kingdom
- Language: English

Frequencies, also known as OXV: The Manual, is a 2013 independent British science fiction romance, thriller film written and directed by Darren Paul Fisher. The film stars Daniel Fraser, Eleanor Wyld, and Owen Pugh. The film takes place in a world where human worth and emotional connections are determined by set "frequencies". The film was produced by Fisher and Alice Hazel Henley, and released on 24 July 2013.

== Plot ==
The plot develops in a world where every person emits a specific frequency which determines his or her luck, further determining his or her success in life. Higher frequency means better luck and thus less feelings. In this world where relationship, connections, and life worth is determined by predestined "frequencies", Isaac-Newton Midgeley, known as Zak, is a Low Born who wants to change his fate and start a relationship with High Born savant, Marie-Curie Fortune.

Despite his teachers and his parents who tell Zak that Marie and he are opposites which will never attract, Zak attempts throughout his youth to court Marie, with no success. Marie, being of high frequency, is unable to feel emotion; however, her goal is to feel love. Zak's friend, Theo, attempts to help Zak raise his frequency, a feat claimed to be impossible. During his teenage years, Zak uses magnets and other methods to no avail.

Upon returning, as a young adult to Marie's birthday, he claims to be able to raise his frequency and eventually manages a kiss from Marie. The two end up spending the night together. Zak discovers with Theo that sound waves, when combined with gibberish two-syllable words, are able to temporarily raise one's frequency. They create a cell phone device which, based on the environment, is able to determine which words can raise one's frequency.

However, Zak and Marie discover that the words actually have mind-controlling properties, which may have caused their love. A secret government organization detains Zak and his associates, revealing that this phenomenon had been known throughout history but slowly forgotten. By 1760, this phenomenon had lost much of its power. Unable to contact Theo, Zak uses a word to paralyze his captor and escapes. Zak escapes to Theo's house whose father reveals that music, specifically by Mozart, can balance everyone's frequencies and nullify the mind-controlling properties of these words. Theo is able to calculate an equation based on music and discover that fate exists. He is able to predict the future and destinies of others. Zak and Marie realize their love was caused by fate, not choice. Finding this irrelevant, the two hold hands while Theo realizes the perfect philosophical equation.

== Cast ==
- Daniel Fraser as Isaac-Newton "Zak" Midgeley
  - Charlie Rixon as young Zak
  - Dylan Llewellyn as teen Zak
- Eleanor Wyld as Marie-Curie Fortune
  - Lily Laight as young Marie
  - Georgina Minter-Brown as teen Marie
- Owen Pugh as Theodor-Adorno "Theo" Strauss
  - Ethan Turton as young Theo
  - Tom England as teen Theo

== Reception ==
The film holds a 100% approval rating on Rotten Tomatoes, a review aggregator, based on seven reviews. Daniel Gold of The New York Times wrote, "While the detached, deadpan tone and occasionally stilted acting might leave some viewers flat, there’s no doubting the fierce intelligence behind this admirable puzzle box of a movie." Alan Scherstuhl of The Village Voice said the film was "an uncommonly ambitious science-fiction romance ... sparkling and unsettling at once". MaryAnn Johanson of Flick Filosopher praised the film for its "incredibly ambitious and profoundly provocative science fiction drama about ideas that require no FX to sell them". John DeFore of The Hollywood Reporter wrote, "Though the explanations Fisher comes up with for his sci-fi contrivances may not be fully satisfying in the end, the conceits themselves offer much to play with, bringing the film into that pleasing area where an imaginary reality has interesting things to say about our own." Richard Whittaker of The Austin Chronicle wrote, "What raises Fisher's script to the upper echelons of the current wave of intellectually challenging indie sci-fi ... is that it truly weaves its concept into its nature." Kurt Halfyard of Twitch Film wrote that it "is chock-a-block full of knowledge, destiny and imagination, but suffers a bit from a lack of heart and soul."
