= Darren Paul Fisher =

British feature film screenwriter

Darren Paul Fisher is a British feature film screenwriter, producer and director. Fisher is also the Head of Film, Screen and Creative Media at Bond University.

== Films ==
Fisher's first film, Inbetweeners was released by Universal in 2001 and was the first British commercial film to be shot on Digital Video. It was panned by Peter Preston of The Observer. His second film, the 2007 teen-comedy Popcorn starred British soap stars Jack Ryder and Jodi Albert, was distributed by MovieHouse, and was panned by Peter Bradshaw of The Guardian.

His third film, OXV: The Manual, a science fiction romance created on a low budget and later retitled Frequencies, premiered at the Fantasia International Film Festival in Montreal where it won two awards, Most Innovative Film and the Silver Award for Best International Film. The US premiere was at the Austin Film Festival where it won the Jury Award for Best Narrative Feature (Dark Matters). The film was favorably reviewed by The Hollywood Reporter, Ain't It Cool News, and Indiewire, although This is Famous criticized the storyline. Unlike Fisher's first two films, Frequencies has generated praise from reviewers for the creativity of Fisher's script.

== Filmography ==
- Inbetweeners
- Popcorn
- Frequencies
