= Welcome to the Jungle (2013 film) =

2013 film by Rob Meltzer

- Theatrical release poster
- Directed by: Rob Meltzer
- Written by: Jeff Kauffmann
- Produced by: Justin Kanew; Luillo Ruiz
- Starring: Jean-Claude Van Damme; Adam Brody; Megan Boone; Rob Huebel; Kristen Schaal; Eric Edelstein; Dennis Haysbert
- Cinematography: Eric Haase
- Edited by: Harry Yoon
- Music by: Karl Preusser
- Production company: Pimienta Film Company
- Distributed by: Universal Pictures
- Release dates: April 27, 2013 (Newport Beach Film Festival); February 7, 2014 (United States)
- Running time: 94 minutes
- Country: United States
- Language: English
- Budget: $3.5 million
- Box office: $230,851(US domestic video sales)

Welcome to the Jungle is a 2013 American comedy film directed by Rob Meltzer and starring Jean-Claude Van Damme, Adam Brody, Megan Boone, Rob Huebel, Kristen Schaal and Dennis Haysbert. The film premiered at the 2013 Newport Beach Film Festival.

== Plot ==
An office team go on a two-day team-building seminar on a tropical island. The group includes Chris, a meek office worker and Eagle Scout; Phil, a manipulative bully who steals his ideas; Lisa, an HR manager and Chris' love interest; and Jared, a sarcastic slacker. However, when the pilot is found dead and Storm, their ex-Marine guide, is mauled by a tiger, the office workers must fend for themselves.

Phil tries to assume leadership, but the group votes for Chris. Later, Phil wants to sacrifice Javier so they can eat him. He finds some coffee and adds a hallucinogenic herb that induces an orgy among some of the coworkers. They split into two teams. Chris’ team consists of Lisa, Jared, and Brenda. Phil feeds his team more psychedelic herbs and sets himself up as God.

Chris` team finds an abandoned building with supplies. However, Storm is revealed to be alive and not a marine. Chris' team is captured by Phil's group, and Chris beats Phil by pretending to be a better God.

A ship rescues the workers, except Phil who is left behind. Storm is arrested for impersonating a marine. Chris gets Phil's job, but quits, taking Lisa with him. It is also revealed Jared is now dating Brenda.

== Cast ==
- Jean-Claude Van Damme as Storm Rothschild
- Adam Brody as Chris
- Megan Boone as Lisa
- Rob Huebel as Phil
- Kristen Schaal as Brenda
- Eric Edelstein as Jared
- Dennis Haysbert as Mr. Crawford
- Bianca Bree as Ashley
- Kristopher van Varenberg as Brett
- Robert Peters as Dale
- Aaron Takahashi as Troy
- Brian Tester as Senior Naval Officer
- Stephanie López as Stephanie
- Mark Sherman as Sailor Bob
- Michael J. Morris as Michael
- Zev Glassenberg as Luther the Intern

== Production ==
Shooting took place in Puerto Rico in early 2012.

== Reception ==
Rotten Tomatoes, review aggregator, reports that 22% of nine surveyed critics gave the film a positive review; the average rating is 4/10. Metacritic rated it 25/100 based on seven reviews. John DeFore of The Hollywood Reporter wrote, "A decent cast is stranded on a desert island with a script best suited for campfire kindling". Betsy Sharkey of the Los Angeles Times wrote that the film is not funny or clever enough to work as a satire or farce, though it is unclear for which the film was aiming. Steven Rea of The Philadelphia Inquirer rated it 1.5/4 stars and called it a "bumble-headed throwaway".
