= Kick Up the Fire =

British band

Kick Up The Fire
- Origin: London, England
- Genres: Indie Rock / garage punk
- Members: Kenny Wastell; Andrew Hutson; Thom Wicks; Marek Bereza
- Website: kickupthefire.com

Kick Up The Fire are a British garage punk band from South East London. They released their debut EP Kick Up The Fire in 2010 which was later followed by their second EP Money Men in 2012

== Band members ==
- Kenny Wastell – lead vocals, guitar
- Thom Wicks – bass guitar, vocals
- Marek Bereza – guitar
- Andrew Hutson – drums
