= The Patrol =

- Directed by: Tom Petch
- Written by: Tom Petch
- Produced by: Tom Petch; Tom Stuart; Karim Debbagh
- Cinematography: Stu Bentley
- Edited by: Luke Deverill
- Music by: James McWilliam and Nick Crofts
- Release dates: 4 October 2013 (Raindance Film Festival); 7 February 2014 (United Kingdom)
- Running time: 79 minutes
- Country: United Kingdom
- Language: English

The Patrol is a 2013 British action drama film set in Helmand Province, Afghanistan in 2006. It looks at the Afghan conflict through the eyes of British soldiers. It won Film of the Festival (Feature) at Raindance Film Festival 2013.

== Cast ==
- Owain Arthur as Taff
- Nicholas Beveney as Sergeant 'Sol' Campbell
- Daniel Fraser as Lieutenant Jonathan Bradshaw
- Alex McNally as Ginge
- Oliver Mott as Stab
- Ben Righton as Captain William Richardson
- Nav Sidhu as Smudge

== Release ==
The Patrol was released by Soda Pictures on 7 February 2014 in the United Kingdom and on 26 May 2014 by Epic Pictures Group in the United States.

== Reception ==
Peter Bradshaw of The Guardian gave it four out of five stars, praising the film's director, "writer-director Tom Petch makes a powerful impression with this tough, smart war movie on a shrewdly managed small scale, about a British army patrol in Afghanistan."

== Awards ==
- Winner Film of the Festival (Feature) Raindance Film Festival 2013.
- Nominated British Independent Film Awards 2013.
