= Monte Walsh =

Monte Walsh may refer to:

- Monte Walsh (novel), a 1963 Western novel, the basis of the films
- Monte Walsh (1970 film), starring Lee Marvin, Jeanne Moreau, and Jack Palance
- Monte Walsh (2003 film), a remake of the earlier movie, starring Tom Selleck, Isabella Rossellini, and Keith Carradine
