= Shane (film) =

1953 film by George Stevens

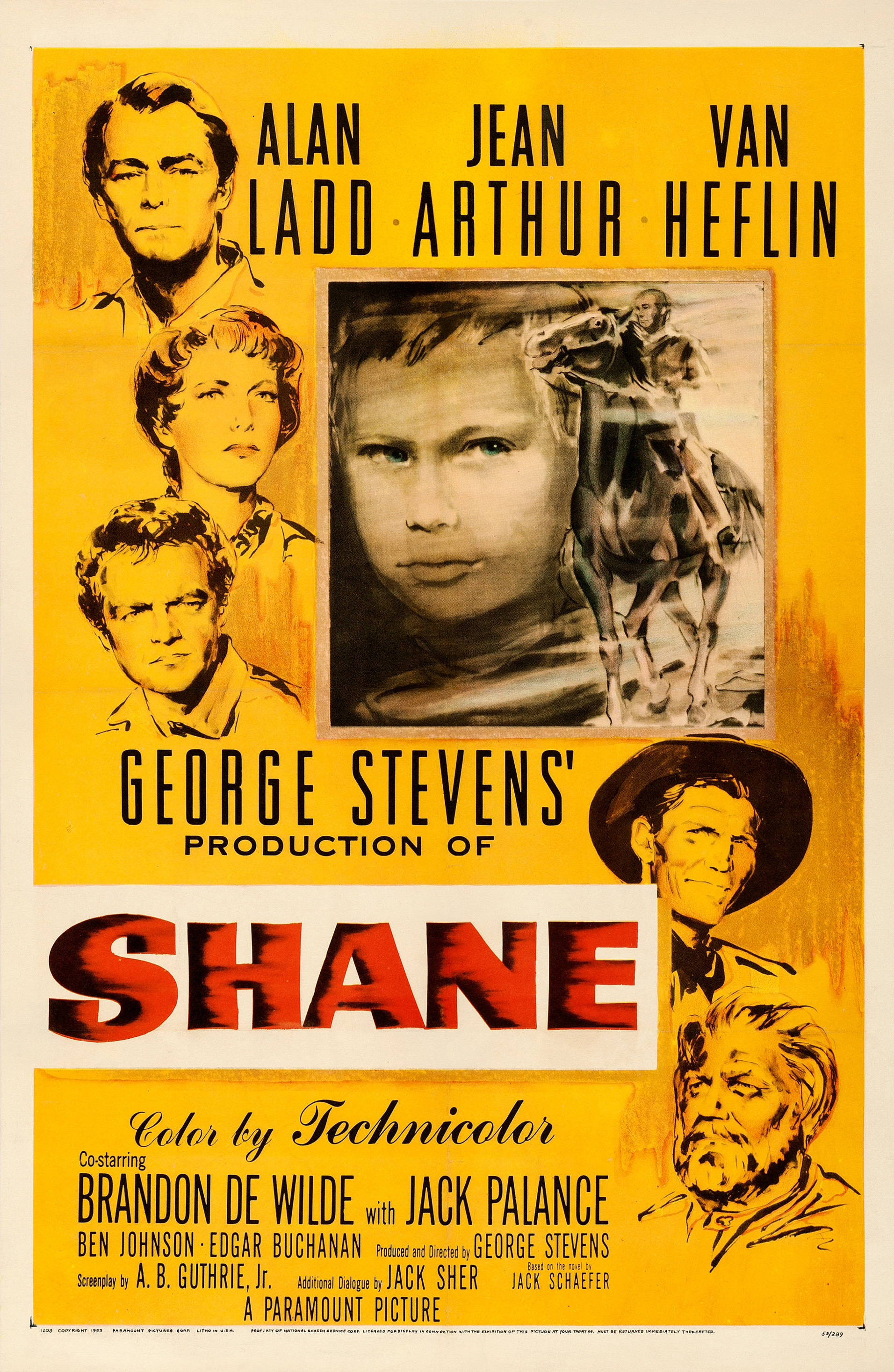
- Theatrical release poster
- Directed by: George Stevens
- Screenplay by: A. B. Guthrie Jr.
- Additional dialogue by: Jack Sher
- Based on: Shane (1949 novel) by Jack Schaefer
- Produced by: George Stevens
- Starring: Alan Ladd; Jean Arthur; Van Heflin; Brandon deWilde; Jack Palance
- Cinematography: Loyal Griggs
- Edited by: William Hornbeck; Tom McAdoo
- Music by: Victor Young
- Distributed by: Paramount Pictures
- Release date: April 23, 1953
- Running time: 118 minutes
- Country: United States
- Language: English
- Budget: $1.5 million
- Box office: $9 million (U.S. and Canada rentals)

Shane is a 1953 American Western film directed and produced by George Stevens and starring Alan Ladd, Jean Arthur, Van Heflin, Brandon deWilde and Jack Palance. The screenplay, written by A. B. Guthrie Jr. (with contributions from Jack Sher), is based on the 1949 novel of the same name by Jack Schaefer. Set in the Wyoming Territory in 1889, the film follows the titular character, seemingly a drifter with a mysterious past (who turns out to be a gunfighter) who becomes embroiled in a conflict between poor homesteaders and wealthy ranchers. The novel and film were both inspired by the Johnson County War (1889–1893).

The film was released by Paramount Pictures on April 23, 1953. It was both a critical and commercial success, and was noted at the time for its Technicolor landscape cinematography, editing, performances, and contributions to the genre. It was also the last feature film and the only color film of Jean Arthur's career.

Shane was nominated for five Academy Awards, including Best Picture and Best Director, winning for Best Cinematography – Color (Loyal Griggs). It was listed as number 45 in the 2007 edition of AFI's 100 Years...100 Movies list, and number three on AFI's 10 Top 10 in the Western category. In 1993, the film was selected for preservation in the United States' National Film Registry by the Library of Congress as being "culturally, historically, or aesthetically significant".

== Plot ==
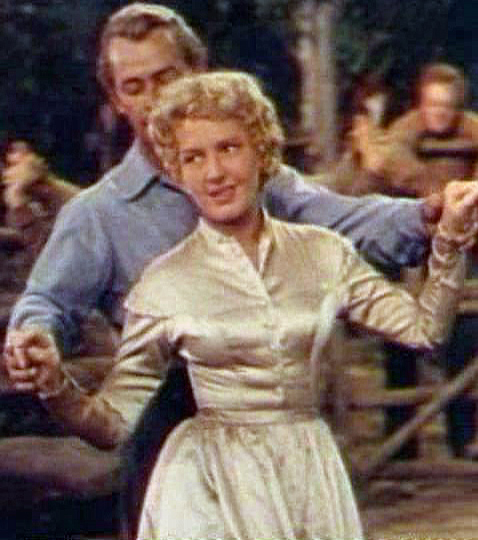
Shane (Alan Ladd) and Marian Starrett (Jean Arthur)

Shane, a laconic but skilled gunfighter with a mysterious past, rides into an isolated valley in the sparsely settled Wyoming Territory in 1889. A drifter, he is hired as a farmhand by hardscrabble rancher Joe Starrett, who is homesteading with his wife, Marian, and their young son, Joey. Starrett tells Shane that a war of intimidation is being waged on the valley's settlers. Though they have claimed their land legally under the Homestead Acts, a ruthless cattle baron, Rufus Ryker, has hired various rogues and henchmen to harass them and force them out of the valley.

Shane goes to town alone to buy supplies at Grafton's, a general store with an adjacent saloon. Shane enters the saloon, where Ryker's men are drinking, and orders a soda pop for Joey. Chris Calloway, one of Ryker's men, ridicules and taunts Shane by throwing his drink on him, but Shane ignores him and leaves. On Shane's next trip to town with the Starretts and other homesteaders, he fights and defeats Calloway, and then he and Starrett win a bar room brawl against most of Ryker's other men. Ryker promises that the next fight will be with guns; he hires Jack Wilson, an unscrupulous and notoriously skilled gunfighter. Joey admires Shane, much to his mother's chagrin, after Shane demonstrates his shooting skills.

Frank "Stonewall" Torrey, a hot-tempered ex-Confederate homesteader, is taunted into drawing his gun by Wilson, who then shoots Torrey dead outside the saloon. At Torrey's funeral, the settlers discuss abandoning their struggle and leaving the valley, but after witnessing one of their homesteads being destroyed in a fire set by Ryker's men, they find new resolve to continue the fight. Ryker concludes that Starrett is primarily responsible for their resolve.

With the purpose of killing him, Ryker invites Starrett to a meeting at the saloon, ostensibly to negotiate a settlement. Calloway, no longer loyal to Ryker, warns Shane of the double cross. Resolved to protect Starrett from an ambush, Shane intervenes, even knocking Starrett unconscious to save him. Shane rides to town with Joey following on foot to watch the fight. Shane kills Wilson, Ryker, and Ryker's brother, but is injured. Outside, Shane sees Joey, who notices that Shane is bleeding. Shane bids farewell and rides out of the valley, ignoring Joey's desperate cries of "Shane! Come back!"

== Cast ==
- Alan Ladd as Shane
- Jean Arthur as Marian Starrett
- Van Heflin as Joe Starrett
- Brandon deWilde as Joey Starrett
- Jack Palance (Note: Credited as Walter Jack Palance.) as Jack Wilson
- Ben Johnson as Chris Calloway
- Edgar Buchanan as Fred Lewis
- Emile Meyer as Rufus Ryker
- Elisha Cook Jr. as Frank "Stonewall" Torrey
- Douglas Spencer as Axel "Swede" Shipstead
- John Dierkes as Morgan Ryker
- Ellen Corby as Mrs. Liz Torrey
- Paul McVey as Sam Grafton, store owner
- John Miller as Will Atkey, bartender
- Edith Evanson as Mrs. Shipstead
- Leonard Strong as Ernie Wright
- Ray Spiker as Axel Johnson
- Janice Carroll as Susan Lewis
- Martin Mason as Ed Howells
- Helen Brown as Martha Lewis
- Nancy Kulp as Mrs. Howells

== Production ==
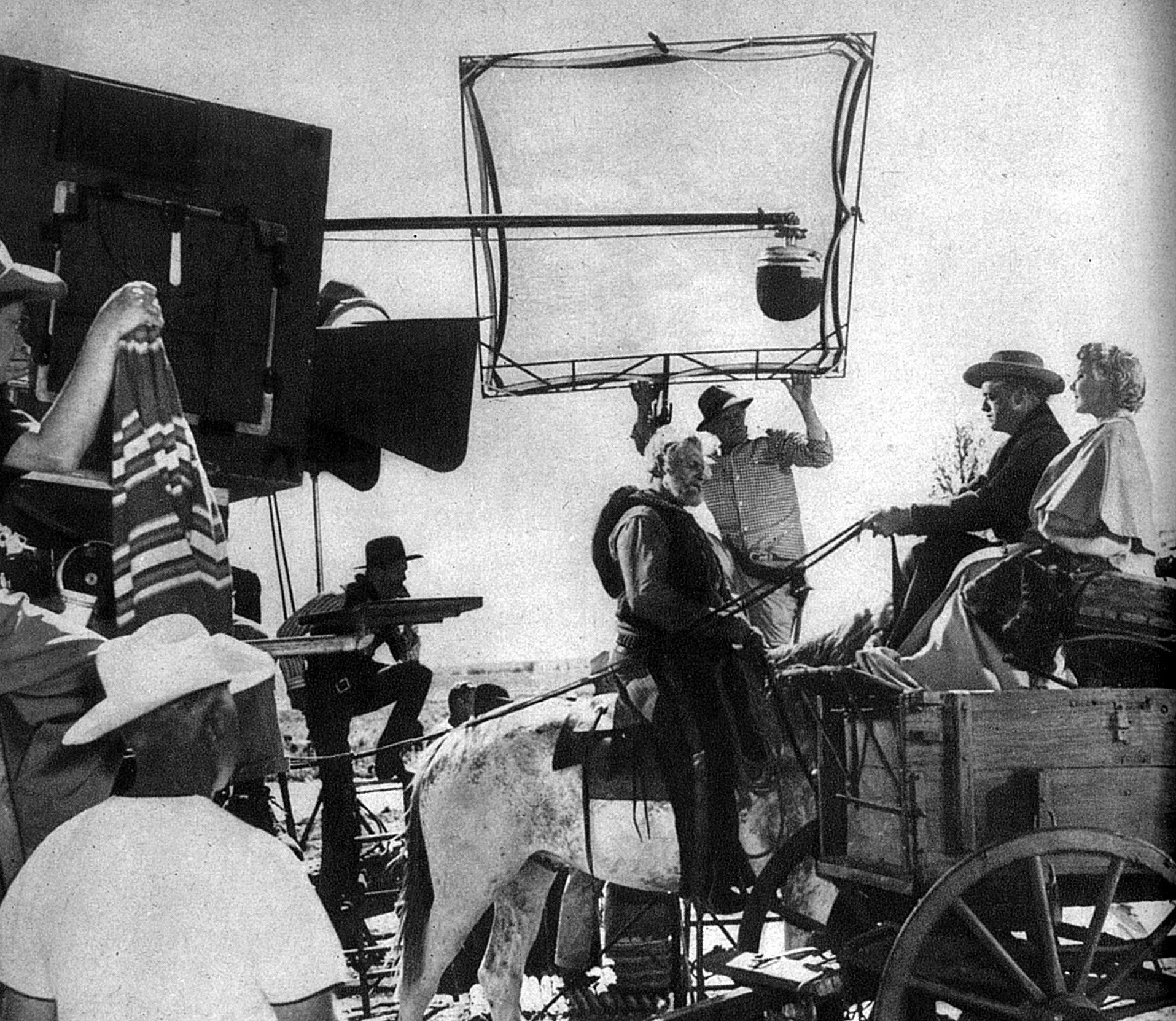
Behind the scenes of the filming of Shane

Shane was expensive for a Western movie at the time; its cost was $3.1 million. It was the first film to be projected in a "flat" widescreen 1.66:1 ratio, a format that Paramount invented to offer audiences a wider panorama than television could provide.

Although never explicitly stated, the basic plot elements of Shane were derived from the 1892 Johnson County War in Wyoming, the archetypal cattlemen/homesteaders conflict, which also served as the background for The Virginian and Heaven's Gate. The physical setting is the high plains near Jackson, Wyoming, and many shots feature the Grand Teton massif looming in the near distance. The fictional town and Starrett homestead were constructed for the film near Kelly, in the Jackson Hole valley, and demolished after filming was completed. One vintage structure that appeared briefly in the film, the Ernie Wright Cabin (now popularly referred to by locals as the "Shane Cabin") still stands, but is steadily deteriorating due to its classification as "ruins" by the National Park Service.

Alan Ladd disliked and was uncomfortable with guns; Shane's shooting demonstration for Joey required 116 takes. A careful review of Shane's gun-skill demonstration to Joey shows Alan Ladd firing with his eyes closed. Later, in the saloon battle, Ladd's pistol is pointed well away from the man he shoots, especially the final scene—where he kills Ryker's brother. Jack Palance was nervous around horses, and had great difficulty with mounting and dismounting. After very many attempts, he finally executed a flawless dismount, which Stevens then used for all of the Wilson character's dismounts and—run in reverse—his mounts as well. Palance looked so awkward on horseback that Stevens was forced to replace Wilson's introductory ride into town astride his galloping horse with Palance riding at walking pace. Stevens later noted that the change actually made Wilson's entrance more dramatic and menacing.

The final scene, in which the wounded Shane explains to a distraught Joey why he has to leave ("There's no living with a killing"), was a moving moment for the entire cast and crew, except Brandon deWilde. "Every time Ladd spoke his lines of farewell, deWilde crossed his eyes and stuck out his tongue, making Ladd laugh. Finally, Ladd called to the boy's father, 'Make the kid stop or I'll beat him over the head.' DeWilde behaved."

=== Casting ===
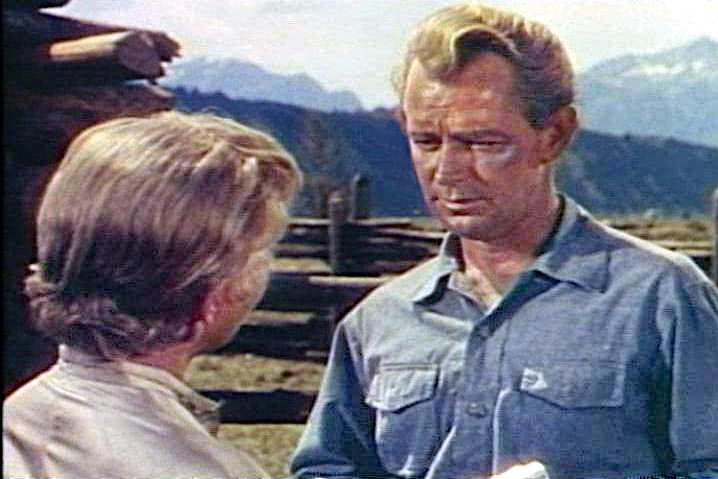
Alan Ladd as Shane

Director George Stevens originally wanted Montgomery Clift and William Holden for the Shane and Starrett roles; when both proved unavailable, Stevens asked Paramount executive Y. Frank Freeman for a list of available actors with current contracts; within three minutes, he chose Alan Ladd, Van Heflin, and Jean Arthur. Shane was Arthur's first cinematic role in five years, and her last, at the age of 50, though she later appeared in theater, and a short-lived television series. She accepted the part at the request of Stevens, who had directed her in The Talk of the Town (1942) with Cary Grant and Ronald Colman, and The More the Merrier (1943) for which she received her only Oscar nomination.

When asked if he enjoyed the movie, the author of Shane, Jack Schaefer, replied, "Yeah, I did, all except for that runt", referring to the five-foot-six-inch (168 cm) Ladd. In 1989, Schaefer told the Oberlin alumni magazine that his Shane character was supposed to be a "dark, deadly person" whom he had hoped would be played by George Raft.

=== Technical details ===
Although the film was shot using the standard 1.37:1 Academy ratio, Paramount picked Shane to debut its wide-screen system because it was composed largely of long and medium shots that would not be compromised by cropping the image. Using a newly cut aperture plate in the movie projector, and a wider-angle lens, the film was exhibited in first-run venues at an aspect ratio of 1.66:1. For its premiere, the studio replaced the 34-by-25-foot screen in Radio City Music Hall with one measuring 50 feet wide by 30 feet high. Paramount produced all of its subsequent films at that ratio until 1954, when it switched to 1.85:1. Shane was originally released in April 1953 with a conventional optical soundtrack, but as its popularity grew, a new three-track, stereophonic soundtrack was recorded and played on an interlocking 35 mm magnetic reel in the projection booth.

Stevens wanted to demonstrate to audiences "the horrors of violence". To emphasize the terrible power of gunshots, he created a cannon-like sound effect by firing a large-caliber weapon into a garbage can. In addition, he had the two principal shooting victims—Palance and Elisha Cook Jr.—rigged with hidden wires that jerked them violently backward when shot. These innovations, according to film historian Jay Hyams, marked the beginning of graphic violence in Western movies. He quotes Sam Peckinpah: "When Jack Palance shot Elisha Cook Jr. in Shane, things started to change."

== Reception ==
That's just what I need – to get advice from a guy who never saw Shane.

— Henry Winkler as Arthur Fonzarelli, Happy Days

Shane premiered in New York City at Radio City Music Hall on April 23, 1953, and grossed $114,000 in its four weeks there. In all, the film earned about $9 million in theater rentals from the United States and Canada. By one estimate, that translates into about $20 million in actual box-office receipts.

Bosley Crowther called the film a "rich and dramatic mobile painting of the American frontier". He continued:

Shane contains something more than the beauty and the grandeur of the mountains and plains, drenched by the brilliant Western sunshine and the violent, torrential, black-browed rains. It contains a tremendous comprehension of the bitterness and passion of the feuds that existed between the new homesteaders and the cattlemen on the open range. It contains a disturbing revelation of the savagery that prevailed in the hearts of the old gunfighters, who were simply legal killers under the frontier code. And it also contains a very wonderful understanding of the spirit of a little boy amid all the tensions and excitements and adventures of a frontier home.

Crowther called "the concept and the presence" of Joey, the little boy played by Brandon deWilde, "key to permit[ting] a refreshing viewpoint on material that's not exactly new. For it's this youngster's frank enthusiasms and naive reactions that are made the solvent of all the crashing drama in A. B. Guthrie Jr.'s script."

Woody Allen has called Shane "George Stevens' masterpiece", on his 2001 list of great American films, along with The Treasure of the Sierra Madre, White Heat, Double Indemnity, The Informer, and The Hill. Shane, he wrote, "is a great movie and can hold its own with any film, whether it's a Western or not."

On review aggregator website Rotten Tomatoes, Shane has a 97% critical approval rating, based on 39 reviews.

== Awards and nominations ==
Award	Category	Nominee(s)	Result	Ref.
Academy Awards	Best Motion Picture	George Stevens	Nominated	
Academy Awards	Best Director	George Stevens	Nominated	
Academy Awards	Best Supporting Actor	Brandon deWilde	Nominated	
Academy Awards	Best Supporting Actor	Jack Palance	Nominated	
Academy Awards	Best Screenplay	A.B. Guthrie Jr.	Nominated	
Academy Awards	Best Cinematography – Color	Loyal Griggs	Won	
British Academy Film Awards	Best Film		Nominated	
British Academy Film Awards	Best Foreign Actor	Van Heflin	Nominated	
Directors Guild of America Awards	Outstanding Directorial Achievement in Motion Pictures	George Stevens	Nominated	
National Board of Review Awards	Top Ten Films		2nd Place	
National Board of Review Awards	Best Director	George Stevens	Won	
National Film Preservation Board	National Film Registry		Inducted	
New York Film Critics Circle Awards	Best Director	George Stevens	Nominated	
Online Film & Television Association Awards	Film Hall of Fame: Productions		Inducted	
Writers Guild of America Awards	Best Written American Drama	A. B. Guthrie Jr.	Nominated	

=== American Film Institute ===
- AFI's 100 Years...100 Movies: No. 69
- AFI's 100 Years...100 Movies (10th Anniversary Edition): No. 45
- AFI's 100 Years...100 Heroes & Villains: Shane, Hero No. 16
- AFI's 100 Years...100 Movie Quotes: "Shane. Shane. Come back!", No. 47
- AFI's 100 Years...100 Cheers: No. 53
- AFI's 10 Top 10: No. 3 Western

== Legacy ==
The 1966 TV series Shane starring David Carradine was directly based on the film.

The 1980 Japanese film A Distant Cry from Spring (遙かなる山の呼び声) features a similar plot.

The 1971 Indian film Door Ka Raahi, directed by famous playback singer Kishore Kumar, was based on and adapted from this film.

In 1981, British singer Kim Wilde released the song "Shane" as the B-side to her single "Chequered Love". The lyrics, written by Wilde's brother Ricky and her father Marty, deal with the impressions of the movie.

The 1982 Italian comic book Ken Parker 53 - I Pionieri, published by Sergio Bonelli Editore draws inspiration from this movie. It reimagines the story of Shane, with Ken Parker as a lone hero protecting a broken settler family in the American West.

The 1983 Japanese TV movie The Duel in the Forbidden Territory has a similar plot and dialogue, though it has two additions; the boy discovers gold nuggets near their home, and the father has a past history with a ninja criminal gang, and his former associates are now seeking revenge.

The 1984 song by Roger Waters, "The Pros and Cons of Hitch Hiking", includes the lyric "Do you remember Shane?" and the recording features interspersed audio from the film.

The 1985 song by Haustor, "Šejn" from their album Bolero is named after the film.

The 1987 postapocalyptic movie, Steel Dawn, closely follows the plot of Shane, according to Walter Goodman of The New York Times.

In his 1997 album Arizona Bay, Bill Hicks parodies Jack Palance's role in Shane with track 8, "Bullies of the World", likening an unspecified "we", the arms-producing countries, to Jack Wilson taunting the farmer to "pick up the gun".

In the 1998 action thriller film The Negotiator, the two leading characters have a discussion about Western genre films, Shane in particular. Arguing about the ending, Chris Sabian says Shane died, and Danny Roman says "he's slumped 'cause he's shot. Slumped don't mean dead."

Shane was the first film comedian Billy Crystal saw in theaters. In his autobiography and stage show 700 Sundays, he describes the experience of seeing the film with family friend and babysitter Billie Holiday, and having an emotional reaction to the final scene. Crystal later starred alongside Palance in City Slickers.

In the 2013 Hallmark series Signed, Sealed, Delivered, "Shane, come back", was referenced.

The 2017 superhero film Logan features characters watching scenes from the film, with lines from the film directly quoted.

== Copyright status in Japan ==
In 2006, Shane was the subject of litigation in Japan involving its copyright status in that country. Two Japanese companies began selling budget-priced copies of Shane in 2003, based on a Japanese copyright law that at the time protected cinematographic works for 50 years from the year of their release. After the Japanese legislature amended the law in 2004 to extend the duration of motion picture copyrights from 50 to 70 years, Paramount and its Japanese distributor filed suit against the two companies. A Japanese court ruled that the amendment was not retroactive, so any film released during or prior to 1953 remained in the public domain in Japan.
