= Bobby Roberts (film producer) =

American film producer

- Born: May 9, 1929
- Died: October 10, 2004 (aged 75)
- Known for: Co-founding Dunhill Records and Mums Records; Managing musical artists; Producing films with Hal Landers

Robert M. "Bobby" Roberts (May 9, 1929 – October 10, 2004) (born Robert Rosenberg) was an American music executive, talent manager, film producer, and dancer. He co-founded Dunhill Records and Mums Records, managed bands including The Mamas & the Papas and Steppenwolf, and was a producer of films including The Gypsy Moths, Monte Walsh, Death Wish, and Bank Shot. Roberts frequently worked with Hal Landers, producing films under Landers and Roberts Films, promoting concerts under Artists Consultants, and publishing music under L&R Music.

== Life and career ==
In the 1950s, Roberts headlined a dance team known as the Dunhills.

In 1964, Roberts co-founded Dunhill Productions, which became Dunhill Records the following year. Roberts also managed performers such as The Mamas & the Papas, Richard Pryor, Mort Sahl, Cass Elliot, Paul Anka, Ann-Margret, Johnny Rivers and many others.

Roberts was a producer of the 1969 drama film The Gypsy Moths, the 1970 Western film Monte Walsh, and the 1972 crime comedy film The Hot Rock with Landers.

Roberts formed Mums Records with Hal Landers and Don Altfeld in 1972. The label, which was distributed by Columbia Records, had several notable releases, including Albert Hammond's hit single "It Never Rains in Southern California", and the album Slow Flux by Steppenwolf.

Roberts was a producer of the 1974 vigilante action film Death Wish and the 1974 heist comedy film Bank Shot with Landers.

In 1979, Roberts testified in a lawsuit by Michelle Triola Marvin against Lee Marvin.

== Works ==
=== Film ===
Year	Film	Credit	Notes
1969	The Gypsy Moths	Producer	
1970	Monte Walsh	Producer	
1972	The Hot Rock	Producer	
1974	Death Wish	Producer	
1974	Bank Shot	Producer	
1977	Joyride	Executive producer	
1977	Damnation Alley	Executive producer	
1982	Death Wish II	Executive producer	Final film as a producer

=== Television ===
Year	Title	Credit	Notes
2003	Monte Walsh	Co-executive producer	Television film
