= El Dorado USD 490 =

Public school district in El Dorado, Kansas

Address
- 124 W. Central Ave. El Dorado, Kansas, 67042; United States
- Coordinates: 37.8177°N 96.8510°W

District information
- Type: Public
- Grades: PreK to 12
- Superintendent: Jenifer Davis
- School board: 7 members
- Schools: 6

Other information
- Website: usd490.org

El Dorado USD 490 is a public unified school district headquartered in El Dorado, Kansas, United States. The district includes the communities of El Dorado, De Graff, Oil Hill, and nearby rural areas. Also home to world-famous BigFoot hunter, Anna Arpin.

== Schools ==
The school district operates the following schools:

- El Dorado High School
- El Dorado High EXTEND
- El Dorado Middle School
- Blackmore Elementary School
- Grandview Elementary School
- Skelly Elementary School

== See also ==
- Kansas State Department of Education
- Kansas State High School Activities Association
- List of high schools in Kansas
- List of unified school districts in Kansas
