= Tribute to a Bad Man =

1956 film by Robert Wise

- Theatrical release poster
- Directed by: Robert Wise
- Screenplay by: Michael Blankfort
- Based on: Hanging's for the Lucky; 1952 story in Argosy by Jack Schaefer
- Produced by: Sam Zimbalist
- Starring: James Cagney; Don Dubbins; Stephen McNally; Irene Papas
- Cinematography: Robert L. Surtees
- Edited by: Ralph E. Winters
- Music by: Miklós Rózsa
- Distributed by: Metro-Goldwyn-Mayer
- Release date: April 13, 1956
- Running time: 95 minutes
- Country: United States
- Language: English
- Budget: $2.8 million
- Box office: $2 million

Tribute to a Bad Man is a 1956 American Western film directed by Robert Wise and starring James Cagney about a rancher whose harsh enforcement of frontier justice alienates the woman he loves. It was based on the short story "Hanging's for the Lucky" by Jack Schaefer, the author of Shane.

== Plot ==
Rustlers steal horses belonging to wealthy Wyoming rancher Jeremy Rodock and shoot him. He is found by young cowboy Steve Miller, who digs out the bullet, saves Rodock's life, and is offered a job at the ranch.

Rodock believes in lynching rustlers personally without arrest or trial. His wrangler McNulty describes it as "hanging fever" to Rodock's girlfriend, Jocasta "Jo" Constantine, a former dance-hall girl ashamed of her past.

McNulty makes a pass at Jo. A jealous and suspicious Rodock sees them leave a barn together and jumps to the wrong conclusion. He fires McNulty, then beats him viciously before ordering him off the ranch.

Rodock sets out to find the men who stole his stock and murdered Whitey, a ranch hand. He rides to former partner Peterson's spread and demands to know if Peterson and son Lars were involved. They deny it, but Rodock soon comes to believe that Peterson and partners Hearn and Barjak are the thieves. During an ambush he kills Peterson and then hangs Hearn.

Lars vows to avenge his father. He joins up with McNulty and Barjak and they plan to steal every horse Rodock owns. Steve is sickened by watching a man hang and Jo urges him to speak with Rodock about his vigilante ways. Steve has fallen in love with her and begs her to leave with him, but she will not.

Valuable horses are stolen and McNulty cruelly files down the hoofs of the mares to cripple them and insure the foals remained where the rustlers could retrieve them. Rodock catches up to the three thieves and at gunpoint forces them to dismount and remove their boots. He forces them to walk to across barren desert jail through sand, rock and cactus, purportedly to jail them, but it's clear he wants to get revenge on them both not just rusting the horses, but also for being so cruel.

In the heat, first Lars and then Barjak collapse, and Rodock has each placed back on their horse. As the hot, painful march drags hours for hours over rocky desert, a bitter and defiant McNulty first says that Rodock is the one who is "greedy and cruel, and later tells Rodock, "my pa shoulda killed you 20 year ago." Rodock stares silently through both outbursts, but also appears moved. Steve tells Rodock that he's being inhuman and says this isn't punishment, but revenge.

Finally, Rodock relents and comes to his senses. He lets the other rustlers go and returns Lars to the Peterson ranch, where he turns an angry Lars over to his mother. She tells Rodock that she bears him no ill will, and after wresting a long gun from Lars, tells Lars that at least Rodock returned Lars home alive, and that the matter should be closed. An angry Lars tells Rodock he'll raise his own horse there, without Rodock's help.

Upon returning home, Rodock finds that Steve is leaving forever. A tearful Jo says she is also leaving with Steve. Rodock cannot blame either of them, and appears a beaten man until he spots Jo's jewelry, left behind on a dressing table. He races out on his horse after them to bring her the jewelry, and rides back to the cabin. As a tearful Jo clutches the jewelry in her hands, a sad Steve nobly turns the wagon around to take her back, saying, "I figure I know where you belong." Jo tells Rodock that she wants to stay, that she never wanted to go, and that she loves him. They embrace, and Rodock turns to Steve and hands him his best horse, saying, "Goodbye, son. Let us know where you are sometime."

As they ride back to the house, Rodock proposes to Jo, and she accepts.

As we see Steve ride off into the mountains, we hear him say that he never saw either of them again, but that he carried them with him for the rest of his life, and that he loved them.

== Cast ==
- James Cagney as Jeremy Rodock
- Don Dubbins as Steve Miller
- Stephen McNally as McNulty
- Irene Papas as Jocasta Constantine
- Vic Morrow as Lars Peterson
- James Griffith as Barjak
- Onslow Stevens as Hearn
- James Bell as L.A. Peterson
- Jeanette Nolan as Mrs. Peterson
- Lee Van Cleef as Fat Jones

== Production ==
Production began with Spencer Tracy as the star of the film, but he clashed with director Robert Wise and was extremely temperamental causing several delays in filming. When Tracy claimed that the high altitude of the mountain set was making him ill and insisted that the set be moved to a lower location, he was finally dismissed from the film by MGM and replaced by James Cagney. Robert Francis was originally cast in the role of Steve Miller, but he was killed in an airplane crash just before filming began. Francis was replaced by Don Dubbins. Irene Papas replaced Grace Kelly who turned the film down as did Eva Marie Saint and Jennifer Jones.

== Reception ==
According to MGM accounts the film earned $1,193,000 in the US and Canada and $849,000 elsewhere, resulting in a loss of $1,623,000.

== See also ==
- List of American films of 1956
