= El Dorado High School (Kansas) =

Location
- 401 McCollum Road; El Dorado, Kansas 67042; United States; 37.844862°N 96.844278°W

Information
- School type: Public, High School
- School board: BOE Website
- School district: El Dorado USD 490
- CEEB code: 170865
- Principal: Richard Gilson
- Teaching staff: 35.40 (FTE)
- Grades: 9-12
- Enrollment: 482 (2023-24)
- Student to teacher ratio: 12.2
- Campus: Suburban
- Color: Red Black
- Mascot: Wildcats
- Website: School Website

El Dorado High School (EHS) is a public secondary school in El Dorado, Kansas, United States. It is operated by El Dorado USD 490 public school district, and serves students of grades 9 to 12. The school mascot is the Wildcat, and the school colors are red and black.

== Administration ==
El Dorado High School is currently under the leadership of Principal Richard Gilson. The athletic director/dean of students is Lance Barkley, and the activities director/assistant principal is Summer Ford.

== Extracurricular activities ==
El Dorado High School offers a variety of extra curricular activities. A list is listed below:

=== Athletics ===
==== Fall ====
- Cross Country
- Girls Tennis
- Fall Cheerleading
- Football
- Volleyball
- Boys Soccer

==== Winter ====
- Boys Basketball
- Winter Cheerleading
- Wrestling
- Bowling
- Boys Swimming

==== Spring ====
- Baseball
- Softball
- Track and Field
- Boys Tennis
- Girls Soccer
- Girls Swimming

=== Clubs ===
- Band
- Circle of Friends
- Drama/Thespians
- eSports (competitive)
- Encore
- Forensics
- KAY Club
- National Honor Society
- Orchestra
- Scholar's Bowl
- Science Olympiad
- Student Council
- World Cultures Club
- GSA (Gender and Sexuality Alliance)
- Coding Club

== Notable alumni ==
- Bobby Douglass, ex-professional football player with the Chicago Bears
- Stanley Dunham, maternal grandfather of U.S. President Barack Obama
- Larry Hartshorn, professional football player with the Chicago Cardinals

== See also ==
- List of high schools in Kansas
- List of unified school districts in Kansas
