= G. Wood =

American actor (1919–2000)

- Born: December 31, 1919; Forrest City, Arkansas, U.S.
- Died: July 24, 2000 (aged 80); Macon, Georgia, U.S.
- Occupation: Actor

George Wood (December 31, 1919 – July 24, 2000) was an American film and television actor, usually billed as G. Wood.

Wood was born in Forrest City, Arkansas. He was one of four actors to appear in both the 1970 film M*A*S*H and the television series M*A*S*H (the other three being Timothy Brown, Corey Fischer and Gary Burghoff). In both the film and the television series, Wood played General Hammond. The character was dropped after the show's first season. He also played the psychiatrist in the film Harold and Maude.

Wood died of congestive heart failure in Macon, Georgia, at the age of 80.

== Filmography ==
Year	Title	Role	Notes
1970	MASH	Brig. Gen. Hammond	
1970	Brewster McCloud	Det. Capt. Crandall	
1971	Harold and Maude	Psychiatrist	
1974	Bank Shot	Andrew Constable	
1984	Tightrope	Conventioneer	
