= Jack Schaefer =

American writer (1907–1991)

- Born: Jack Warner Schaefer; November 19, 1907; Cleveland, Ohio, U.S.
- Died: January 24, 1991 (aged 83); Santa Fe, New Mexico, U.S.
- Education: Oberlin College; Columbia University
- Occupation: Writer
- Spouse(s): Eugenia Ives (m. 1931; div. 1948) Louise Deans
- Writing career
- Genre: Western fiction
- Notable work: Shane (1949)

Jack Warner Schaefer (November 19, 1907 – January 24, 1991) was an American writer known for his Westerns. His best-known works are the 1949 novel Shane, considered the greatest western novel by the Western Writers of America, and the 1964 children's book Stubby Pringle's Christmas.

== Early life ==
Jack Warren Schaefer was born in Cleveland, Ohio to Carl and Minnie Schaefer. Carl was a German American attorney. Both his parents were avid readers, and his father was good friends with poet/author Carl Sandburg. Schaefer read voraciously as a child; early favorites were Edgar Rice Burroughs and Alexandre Dumas, before moving onto Charles Dickens and Zane Grey, among others. He was to describe himself as a “literary nut.”

== Education ==
In 1929 Schaefer graduated from Oberlin College with a major in English. From 1929 to 1930 he attended graduate school at Columbia University, but left without completing his Master of Arts degree when the faculty there denied him permission to prepare a master's thesis on the development of motion pictures. Schaefer's education included multiple courses on Greek and Roman mythology, which is thought to have served him well in creating the archetypal heroes that populated his Westerns.

== Journalism and other career work ==
Following his departure from Columbia University, Schaefer went to work for the United Press. In his long career as a journalist, he worked as a reporter for the United Press news agency, as editorial page editor for The Virginian-Pilot in Norfolk, Va., and The Baltimore Sun, and as editor of The New Haven Journal-Courier.

In his career as a journalist, Schaefer wrote innumerable news stories, feature articles, and opinion columns and thousands of book/film/play reviews and editorials.

In the 1930s Schaefer worked as the education director of the Connecticut State Reformatory, and following his stint at the Norfolk Virginian-Pilot (1944 to 1948), he worked in advertising and was a freelance writer before devoting himself to fiction.

== Westerns ==
As a child Schaefer was an avid reader of Zane Grey and was fascinated with the old west. He later studied American history which formed the basis of many of his westerns. In 1945 he began writing fiction after hours as a way of calming down. The story Rider from Nowhere was published in serial form in the magazine Argosy in 1946. It formed the basis of Schaefer's first novel, Shane, set in Wyoming, which was published in 1949 and was a great success.

When he wrote Shane, Schaefer had never traveled farther west than Cleveland, Ohio. The Albuquerque Journal writer Ollie Reed Jr. wrote, “That Schaefer could turn out such a Western before he ever saw the West is a tribute to his dogged research, devotion to facts, and storytelling ability, all honed by his newspaper work.”

Schaefer's other westerns included First Blood (1953), The Canyon (1953), Company of Cowards (1957), The Kean Land and Other Stories (1959), Monte Walsh (1963), Heroes Without Glory: Some Goodmen of the Old West (1965), and The Collected Stories of Jack Schaefer (1966). For television, he co-wrote They Went Thataway, an unsold pilot that aired in 1960 as an episode of New Comedy Showcase.

Schaefer's personal favorites were Monte Walsh and The Canyon.

== Adaptations ==
Schaefer's novel Shane was adapted into the classic 1953 film of the same name starring Alan Ladd, and a short-lived 1966 television series starring David Carradine. When asked whether he'd enjoyed the movie version of Shane, Schaefer referred to Alan Ladd's height, saying, “Yeah, I did, all except for that runt!” At a 1989 ceremony to receive an honorary doctorate from Oberlin, he said Shane was supposed to be "a dark, deadly, person." He had hoped the movie version would be played by the actor George Raft, instead of Alan Ladd. He was apparently dismayed by the TV series, saying, "Please take my name off that piece-of-crap show".

In addition to Shane, seven of his other stories were made into films. Among those, First Blood, was made into the 1953 film The Silver Whip, starring Robert Wagner. Other films included Tribute to a Bad Man with James Cagney, 1956, based on the short story Hanging's for the Lucky; Trooper Hook, 1957, featuring Joel McCrea and Barbara Stanwyck and adapted from the story Sergeant Houck; and 1964's Advance to the Rear, taken from the 1957 novel Company of Cowards.

Monte Walsh was loosely adapted into the 1970 film of the same name starring Lee Marvin, Jeanne Moreau, and Jack Palance, and again as a 2003 television film starring Tom Selleck. Stubby Pringle's Christmas was also adapted into a television film in 1978.

== Conservationism ==
Toward the end of his life, Schaefer became increasingly concerned by human impact on the environment. By 1967, after writing Mavericks, his last western, Schaefer became a conservationist. He wrote three essays in the form of conversations with animals. They were published in book form titled Conversations with a Pocket Gopher. His last book, American Bestiary, was published in 1975.

== Personal life ==
Schaefer was married to Eugenia Ives in 1931, and the couple had three sons and a daughter. They divorced in 1948, and a year later Schaefer married Louise Deans.

In 1955, after taking a train trip West on an assignment from Holiday magazine to do some research on old western cow towns, Schaefer sold his farm near Waterbury, Connecticut, and moved to a 300-acre ranch near Cerrillos, about 20 miles southwest of Santa Fe, New Mexico called the Turquoise Six. He resided in an old adobe home at 905 Camino Ranchitos, just off of Canyon Rd.

Schaefer died of heart failure in Santa Fe in 1991. At the author's graveside service Schaefer's friend Archie West (the inspiration for the character Monte Walsh) read aloud from the last two pages of Monte Walsh, which describe the title character's cowboy burial.

== Awards and legacy ==
In 1975 Schaefer received the Western Literature Association's Distinguished Achievement award.

Shane has been translated into 35 languages since it was published in 1949, and was honored by the Western Writers of America as the finest Western novel. Fifty years after its publication, Shane had sold over 12 million copies.

Schaefer's 1960 children's book, Old Ramon, won a Newbery Honor award. It also won the Ohioana Book Award in 1961, and was chosen as an American Library Association Notable book.

A 1967 New York Times review of Schaefer's collected novels noted that "Jack Schaefer is not a writer of conventional westerns," instead, they were, "tautly told and tightly constructed," and had "additional ingredients that make for complex storytelling."

== Books ==
- Shane (1949)
- First Blood (1953)
- The Big Range (1953) (short stories)
- The Canyon (1953)
- The Pioneers (1954)
- The Piors (1984) (short stories)
- Out West: An Anthology of Stories (1955) (Editor)
- Company of Cowards (1957)
- The Kean Land and Other Stories (1959)
- Old Ramon (1960)
- Tales from the West (1961)
- Incident on the Trail (1962)
- The Plainsmen (1963) (children's book)
- Monte Walsh (1963)
- The Great Endurance Horse Race: 600 Miles on a Single Mount, 1908, from Evanston, Wyoming, to Denver (1963)
- Shane and other stories (1963) (publ. Andre Deutsch, London)
- Stubby Pringle's Christmas (1964) (children's book)
- Heroes without Glory: Some Goodmen of the Old West (1965)
- Collected Stories (1966)
- Adolphe Francis Alphonse Bandelier (1966)
- New Mexico (1967)
- The Short Novels of Jack Schaefer (1967)
- Mavericks (1967) (children's book)
- Hal West: Western Gallery (1971)
- An American Bestiary (1973)
- Conversations with a Pocket Gopher and Other Outspoken Neighbors (1978)
- Jack Schaefer and the American West: Eight Stories (1978) (edited by C.E.J. Smith)
- The Collected Stories of Jack Schaefer (1985)
