= James William Drought =

American writer (1931–1983)

- Born: November 4, 1931; Aurora, Illinois, U.S.
- Died: June 2, 1983 (aged 51); Norwalk, Connecticut, U.S.
- Occupation: Writer
- Known for: Literature

James William Drought (November 4, 1931 – June 2, 1983) was an American author, magazine editor, speech writer and press officer for the Office of Public Relations.

== Biography ==
Drought was born in Aurora, Illinois, and grew up near Chicago. From 1952 to 1954 he served in the U.S. Army in the 82nd Airborne Division as a paratrooper stationed at Fort Bragg, North Carolina. In 1960, he moved to Norwalk, Connecticut, with his family, where he was a magazine editor in New York City.

One of his books was adapted into the movie The Gypsy Moths (1969) starring Burt Lancaster, Deborah Kerr and Gene Hackman. A complete collection of his works is preserved at the Mugar Memorial Library in the Special Collections Department at Boston University.

He died on June 2, 1983, in Norwalk Hospital.

== Publications ==
- Boxed in by the Rich, A Parody (1950)
- The Wedding, A Play for Voices (1953)
- The Gypsy Moths, A Fable (1955)
- Memories of A Humble Man, An Irony (1957)
- Mover, A Modern Tragedy (1959)
- ii A Duo, A Story by Two Men (1961)
- The Secret, An Oratorio of Protest (1962)
- The Enemy, A Personal Reminiscence (1964)
- Drugoth, Biography of a Private Person (1965)
- ALIVEMOVIEBOOK, An Adaptation (1967)
- The Master, A Chronicle (1970)
- Sonny Davis Televised, A Comedy (1972)
- Blessed Bob Bunyan, An Inquiry (1974)
- The Book of Names, A Novel-Verite (1976)
- Superstar for President, A Satire (1978)
- Writer in Exile, A Mystery (1980)
- So Long Chicago, A Novel of Improvisational Comedy (1982)
- Queen of Spades (unpublished) (1983)
