= Monte Walsh (novel) =

1963 Western novel by Jack Schaefer

- Author: Jack Schaefer
- Language: English
- Genre: Western
- Publisher: Bison Books
- Publication date: 1963
- Publication place: United States
- Media type: Print
- ISBN: 978-0-82635-857-8 (paperback edition)
- OCLC: -

Monte Walsh is a Western novel written by Jack Schaefer and published on January 1, 1963. It was loosely adapted into a movie in 1970 and Monty Walsh (2003 TNT television film)

== Reception ==
Kirkus Reviews highlighted how "as Monte learns every aspect of a cowboy's role, the details are spread out for reader satisfaction". They concluded, "What Schaefer does is lift all this out of the realm of light entertainment and into life where the rise and fall of 'a good man with a horse' defines his time and carries a lesson for ours".

== Adaptations ==
Monte Walsh was loosely adapted into the 1970 film of the same name starring Lee Marvin, Jeanne Moreau, and Jack Palance, and again as a 2003 television film starring Tom Selleck.
