= Bank Shot =

1974 film by Gower Champion

Bank shot
- film poster by Jack Davis
- Directed by: Gower Champion
- Screenplay by: Wendell Mayes
- Based on: The Bank Shot by Donald E. Westlake
- Produced by: Hal Landers; Bobby Roberts
- Starring: George C. Scott; Joanna Cassidy; Sorrell Booke; G. Wood
- Cinematography: Harry Stradling, Jr.
- Edited by: David Bretherton
- Music by: John Morris
- Production company: Landers-Roberts Productions
- Distributed by: United Artists
- Release date: July 30, 1974
- Running time: 83 minutes
- Country: United States
- Language: English

Bank Shot is a 1974 American heist comedy film directed by Gower Champion and written by Wendell Mayes. It was loosely based upon Donald E. Westlake's 1972 novel of the same name, which was the second book of his "Dortmunder" series. The film stars George C. Scott, Joanna Cassidy, Sorrell Booke, and G. Wood.

== Plot ==
The film is partly narrated by Warden Streiger (known as "Bulldog" Streiger).

A bank, temporarily housed in a mobile home while a new building is built, looks like an easy target to break into. That is what Al Karp, the former partner of jailed criminal planner Walter Ballantine, thinks, so Karp arranges for Ballantine to escape from the Streiger Institute (a privately run penitentiary). Ballantine isn't keen on the job, given that the last one, also brought to him by Karp, landed him in jail. Two members of the team aren't also to his liking: Victor, the nephew of Karp, is a former FBI agent but also absolutely clueless. And the financier of the coup, Eleonora, has got a crush on him. Finally, after seeing the bank, Ballantine is ready to give up. A hold-up is out of question - there isn't a good escape route, and the possibility of being shot in the back when leaving the bank has also to be considered. Because of the opening hours of the nearby stores, on Thursday nights money is kept in the bank. But in a hard-to-crack Mosler safe, guarded by four security guards. So breaking into the bank is also no option.

At this moment, Ballantine has a flash of inspiration: Instead of stealing the money out of the bank, they will steal the whole bank. And while Streiger together with his FBI buddy Andrew Constable is setting up a command center to catch Ballantine, the team around Ballantine is getting to work: Since the provisional bank is missing wheels, they have to steal a tractor together with wheels, and install them under the bank.

Everything is going perfectly and according to plan: They stage a diversion to lure the police patrol cars away from the bank and drive away with it. Thanks to trickery, the guards flee the bank in panic. After camouflaging it by giving it a fresh, pink painting instead of the old green one, they hide it in a trailer park, and start to work on the safe. Even when the police controls the site, the only result is the harassment of another mobile home owner, who has also arrived the same night, and whose trailer is green.

Things begin to go awry when the pink color, not being waterproof, is washed away by a lawn sprinkler, and the manager of the trailer park, not wanting more disturbances, forces them to leave. Without a better option, they park the bank on top of a hill in a wasteland, installing a prominent billboard for real estate development. Resuming the work on the safe, it proves to be a very tough nut. They resort to the use of nitroglycerine, when the mobile home is spotted by a helicopter, and Streiger together with Constable are rushing to the scene. Meanwhile, the team finally blasts open the safe, blowing the roof and the walls of the bank away as collateral damage. The wreckage of the bank, together with the safe, begins to roll down the hill, and only Ballantine manages to jump on it. The ensuing pursuit ends at a high cliff on the coast: The team, together with Streiger, witness how the bank plunges together with Ballantine into the water. Ballantine, not wanting to be arrested again, begins to swim into the open sea. Streiger, being a non-swimmer, has to give up the hunt, and the rest of the team also stays behind.

The movie closes showing the majestic ocean, and a voice-over of Streiger as narrator, telling that some days later, the national bank of Samoa was robbed by a man. Nothing fancy about that, except that he was described as dripping wet, and Streiger vows to learn to swim and that he will catch Ballantine at last.

== Cast ==
- George C. Scott as Walter Upjohn Ballantine
- Joanna Cassidy as Eleanora, also called "El"
- Sorrell Booke as Al G. Karp
- Don Calfa as Stosh Gornik
- Bibi Osterwald as Mums Gornik
- Frank McRae as Herman X
- Bob Balaban as Victor Karp
- G. Wood as FBI Supervisor Andrew Constable
- Clifton James as Warden Streiger
- Liam Dunn as Painter
- Hank Stohl as FBI Agent Johnson
- Jack Riley as FBI Agent Jackson
- Harvey J. Goldenberg as Policeman #1
- Jamie Reidy as Policeman #2
- Harvey Evans as Irving
- Pat Zurica as Man in Privy

== Production ==
Wendell Mayes later said he wrote it because he loved Westlake's novels but felt the film failed due to the direction of Gower Champion. "I felt that Hollywood had never truly done justice to his [Westlake's] peculiar brand of humor in motion pictures," said Mayes. "I was trying to do that brand of humor, something that is just slightly tilted, which at first you don't realize is slightly tilted. It was a charming idea [...] the idea of not simply robbing a bank but stealing the whole building. What happened is that Gower tried to turn it into a farce, and it didn't work. The people weren't equipped to play farce. Gower was a nice guy and a marvelous stage director; but the film simply wasn't deft, and it should have been. He held pretty much to the script but ruined what I thought was a good piece. He was the only bad experience I've ever had in my career with a director. I was bitterly disappointed."

== Reception ==
Vincent Canby of The New York Times was mildly amused: "It's not a great movie. It's not worth taking a taxi to see. Yet there are many less invigorating ways to waste one's time. ... The intensity of Scott's performance is highly comic. His Walter Ballantine has the discipline, self-assurance and narrow vision of the true fanatic. So, too, do most of the other characters in the film... Gower Champion, who has had more success as a Broadway director (Hello, Dolly) than as a maker of films (My Six Loves), seems to have had a great deal of fun with first-rate actors doing Bank Shot — grace of a work by someone who knows exactly what he's doing." Arthur D. Murphy of Variety called it "an innocuous little trifle" and "formula caper material, hyped by humor that is variously silly, forced and strident." Gene Siskel of the Chicago Tribune gave the film two stars out of four and dismissed it as "a trivial, television-caliber, bank heist comedy." Charles Champlin of the Los Angeles Times wrote, "While 'The Bank Shot,' adapted by Wendell Mayes from a Donald Westlake novel, is at best a lightly amusing and never very suspenseful caper film, it is lit with moments of plain wonderful and imaginative silliness." Gary Arnold of The Washington Post stated, "Despite its rather too effective air of inconsequence, 'The Bank Shot' is a reasonably good time," adding that "Champion demonstrates a wonderful talent for staging and shooting wide-screen sight gags." Richard Combs of The Monthly Film Bulletin remarked that the film "definitely looks as if it belongs to a bygone age, to the days of Kramer's Mad, Mad World," with much of its sense of fun coming off as "decidedly strenuous and heavily mugged."

== See also ==
- List of American films of 1974
