= El Dorado, Kansas =

City in Butler County, Kansas

- City and County seat
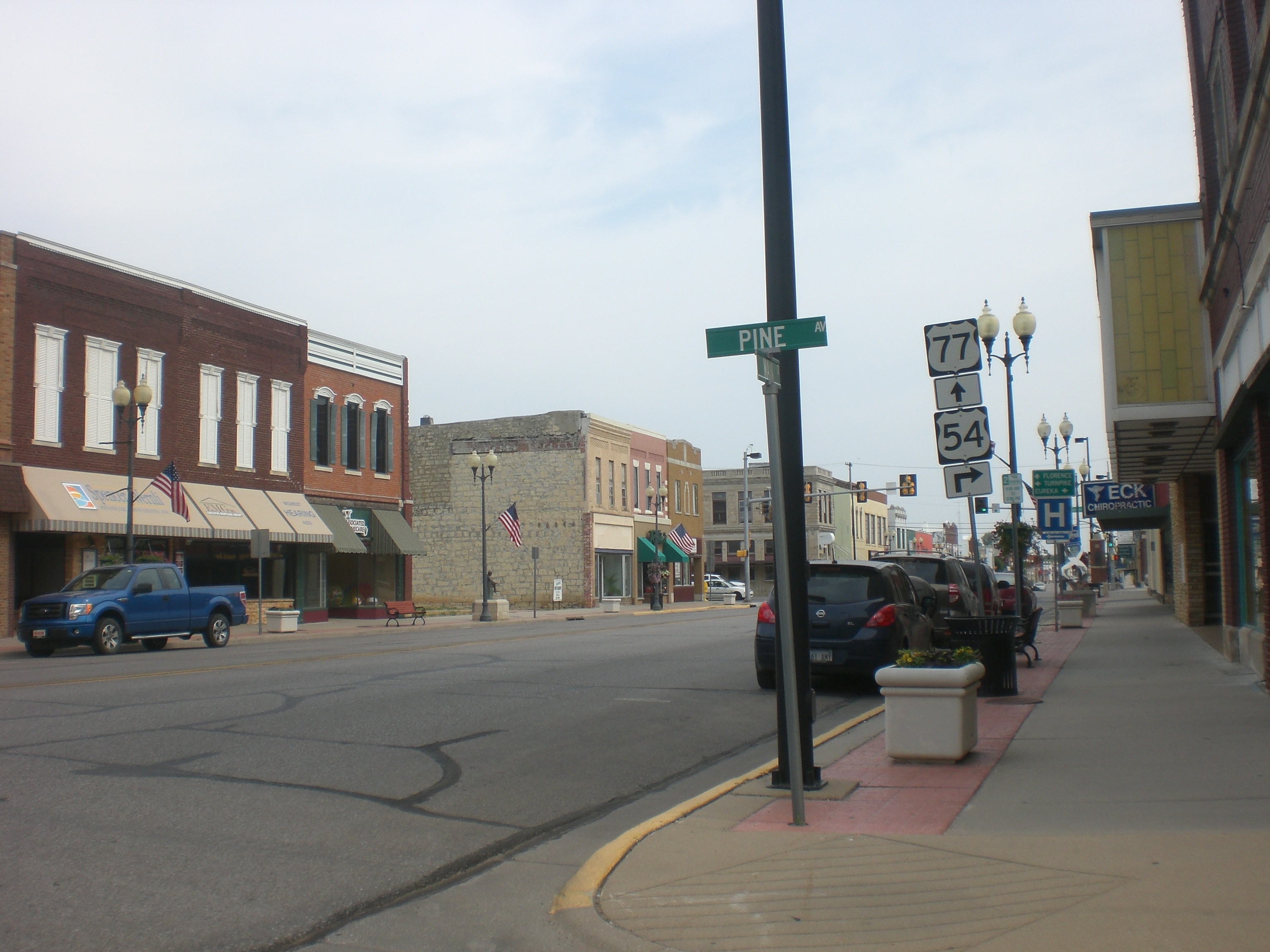
- Main & Pine in El Dorado (2012)

- Location within Butler County and Kansas

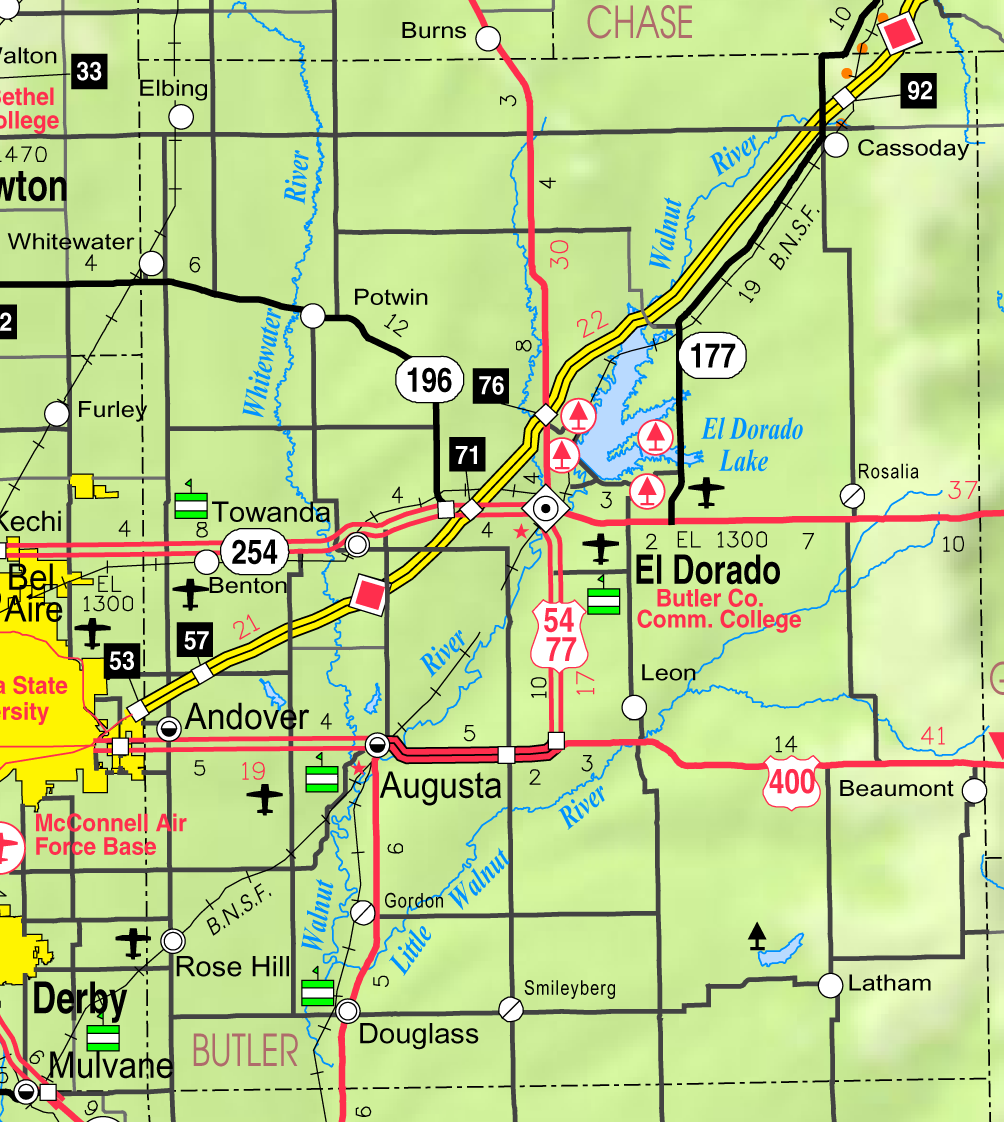
- KDOT map of Butler County (legend)
- Coordinates: 37°49′16″N 96°51′30″W
- Country: United States
- State: Kansas
- County: Butler
- Founded: 1860s
- Platted: 1868
- Incorporated: 1871

Government
  - Type: Commission-Manager
  - Mayor: Bill Young
  - City Manager: David Dillner

Area
  - Total: 9.20 sq mi (23.82 km^{2})
  - Land: 9.16 sq mi (23.72 km^{2})
  - Water: 0.035 sq mi (0.09 km^{2}) 0.67%
- Elevation: 1,332 ft (406 m)

Population (2020)
  - Total: 12,870
  - Density: 1,405/sq mi (542.6/km^{2})
- Time zone: UTC-6 (CST)
  - Summer (DST): UTC-5 (CDT)
- ZIP Code: 67042
- Area code: 316
- FIPS code: 20-20075
- GNIS ID: 485567
- Website: www.eldoks.gov

El Dorado (/ˌɛldəˈreɪdoʊ/ EL-də-RAY-doh) is a city in and the county seat of Butler County, Kansas, United States. It is situated along the Walnut River in the central part of Butler County and located in south-central Kansas. As of the 2020 census, the population of the city was 12,870. It is home to Butler Community College.

== History ==
El Dorado was laid out and platted in 1868. The name is of Spanish origin meaning "golden land". El Dorado was incorporated in 1870.

In 1877, the Florence, El Dorado, and Walnut Valley Railroad Company built a branch line from Florence to El Dorado; in 1881 it was extended to Douglass, and later to Arkansas City. The line was leased and operated by the Atchison, Topeka and Santa Fe Railway. The line from Florence to El Dorado was abandoned in 1942. The original branch line connected Florence, Burns, De Graff, El Dorado, Augusta, Douglass, Rock, Akron, Winfield and Arkansas City.

In 1915, the El Dorado Oil Field was the first oil field that was found using science/geologic mapping, and part of the Mid-Continent oil province. By 1918, the El Dorado Oil Field was the largest single field producer in the United States, and was responsible for 12.8% of national oil production and 9% of the world production. It was deemed by some as "the oil field that won World War I".

In 1916, there was an anti-black race riot in El Dorado after an incident between a black shoe shiner and a white oil worker. Large numbers of black families removed their household goods and moved out of El Dorado.

In 1943, German and Italian prisoners of World War II were brought to Kansas and other Midwest states as a means of solving the labor shortage caused by American men serving in the war effort. Large internment camps were established in Kansas: Camp Concordia, Camp Funston (at Fort Riley), Camp Phillips (at Salina under Fort Riley). Fort Riley established 12 smaller branch camps, including El Dorado. Prisoners commonly volunteered to help work on local farms; this enabled them to spend time outside the camp, socialize and eat better food than that provided by prison guards. In some cases, smaller structures constructed by the work details still stand.

On June 10, 1958, an F4 tornado hit El Dorado, killing 13 people and injuring at least 80. In 2008, the city built a memorial at Graham Park in remembrance of the dead.

== Geography ==
El Dorado is situated along the western bank of the Walnut River, southwest of El Dorado Lake. It is located 30 miles (48 km) east-northeast of Wichita at the junction of U.S. Routes 54 and 77 and K-254. The Kansas Turnpike, designated as Interstate 35, bypasses the city to the northwest.

According to the United States Census Bureau, the city has a total area of 8.92 square miles (23.10 km^{2}), of which 8.86 square miles (22.95 km^{2}) is land and 0.06 square miles (0.16 km^{2}) is water.

=== Climate ===
The climate in this area is characterized by hot, humid summers and generally mild to cool winters. According to the Köppen Climate Classification system, El Dorado has a humid subtropical climate, abbreviated "Cfa" on climate maps.

Climate data for El Dorado, Kansas, 1991–2020 normals, extremes 1893–present
Month	Jan	Feb	Mar	Apr	May	Jun	Jul	Aug	Sep	Oct	Nov	Dec	Year
Record high °F (°C)	78 (26)	84 (29)	94 (34)	99 (37)	101 (38)	108 (42)	117 (47)	116 (47)	112 (44)	98 (37)	85 (29)	80 (27)	117 (47)
Mean maximum °F (°C)	66.0 (18.9)	71.3 (21.8)	79.8 (26.6)	85.9 (29.9)	89.9 (32.2)	95.4 (35.2)	100.1 (37.8)	99.6 (37.6)	95.1 (35.1)	87.0 (30.6)	75.6 (24.2)	66.5 (19.2)	101.6 (38.7)
Mean daily maximum °F (°C)	44.1 (6.7)	48.9 (9.4)	58.9 (14.9)	68.4 (20.2)	76.9 (24.9)	86.3 (30.2)	91.3 (32.9)	90.3 (32.4)	82.7 (28.2)	71.1 (21.7)	57.8 (14.3)	46.4 (8.0)	68.6 (20.3)
Daily mean °F (°C)	32.1 (0.1)	36.1 (2.3)	45.8 (7.7)	55.7 (13.2)	65.7 (18.7)	75.2 (24.0)	80.0 (26.7)	78.5 (25.8)	70.5 (21.4)	58.1 (14.5)	45.5 (7.5)	35.1 (1.7)	56.5 (13.6)
Mean daily minimum °F (°C)	20.2 (−6.6)	23.4 (−4.8)	32.8 (0.4)	43.1 (6.2)	54.5 (12.5)	64.2 (17.9)	68.8 (20.4)	66.8 (19.3)	58.2 (14.6)	45.2 (7.3)	33.1 (0.6)	23.7 (−4.6)	44.5 (6.9)
Mean minimum °F (°C)	3.3 (−15.9)	6.9 (−13.9)	15.4 (−9.2)	28.1 (−2.2)	40.0 (4.4)	53.9 (12.2)	59.9 (15.5)	57.6 (14.2)	42.9 (6.1)	29.1 (−1.6)	16.9 (−8.4)	8.1 (−13.3)	−0.1 (−17.8)
Record low °F (°C)	−23 (−31)	−28 (−33)	−10 (−23)	12 (−11)	25 (−4)	43 (6)	44 (7)	42 (6)	28 (−2)	12 (−11)	−4 (−20)	−18 (−28)	−28 (−33)
Average precipitation inches (mm)	0.89 (23)	1.45 (37)	2.53 (64)	3.41 (87)	5.77 (147)	5.64 (143)	4.42 (112)	4.59 (117)	3.64 (92)	3.29 (84)	1.74 (44)	1.30 (33)	38.67 (983)
Average snowfall inches (cm)	1.1 (2.8)	1.4 (3.6)	0.7 (1.8)	0.0 (0.0)	0.0 (0.0)	0.0 (0.0)	0.0 (0.0)	0.0 (0.0)	0.0 (0.0)	0.0 (0.0)	0.2 (0.51)	1.1 (2.8)	4.5 (11.51)
Average precipitation days (≥ 0.01 in)	5.0	5.6	7.4	8.4	11.5	9.5	8.2	8.7	6.7	7.4	5.6	5.7	89.7
Average snowy days (≥ 0.1 in)	0.9	1.0	0.5	0.0	0.0	0.0	0.0	0.0	0.0	0.1	0.3	1.1	3.9
Source 1: NOAA
Source 2: National Weather Service

== Demographics ==
Historical population
Census	Pop.	Note	%±
1880	1,411		—
1890	3,339		136.6%
1900	3,466		3.8%
1910	3,129		−9.7%
1920	10,995		251.4%
1930	10,311		−6.2%
1940	10,045		−2.6%
1950	11,037		9.9%
1960	12,523		13.5%
1970	12,308		−1.7%
1980	10,510		−14.6%
1990	11,504		9.5%
2000	12,057		4.8%
2010	13,021		8.0%
2020	12,870		−1.2%
2023 (est.)	12,919		0.4%
U.S. Decennial Census; 2010-2020

El Dorado is part of the Wichita Metropolitan Statistical Area.

=== 2020 census ===
As of the 2020 census, El Dorado had a population of 12,870, with 5,136 households and 3,096 families. The population density was 1,405.0 per square mile (542.5/km^{2}), and there were 5,838 housing units at an average density of 637.3 per square mile (246.1/km^{2}).

98.7% of residents lived in urban areas, while 1.3% lived in rural areas.

There were 5,136 households, of which 29.3% had children under the age of 18 living in them. Of all households, 40.0% were married-couple households, 20.3% were households with a male householder and no spouse or partner present, and 31.4% were households with a female householder and no spouse or partner present. About 33.5% of all households were made up of individuals, and 14.8% had someone living alone who was 65 years of age or older. The average household size was 2.1 and the average family size was 2.8.

The median age was 36.2 years. 23.0% of residents were under the age of 18, 12.7% were from 18 to 24, 24.2% were from 25 to 44, 22.2% were from 45 to 64, and 17.9% were 65 years of age or older. For every 100 females there were 97.3 males, and for every 100 females age 18 and over there were 96.4 males age 18 and over.

There were 5,838 housing units, of which 12.0% were vacant. The homeowner vacancy rate was 2.5% and the rental vacancy rate was 14.7%.

Racial composition as of the 2020 census
Race	Number	Percent
White	11,040	85.8%
Two or more races	1,022	7.9%
Hispanic or Latino (of any race)	694	5.4%
Black or African American	377	2.9%
Some other race	222	1.7%
American Indian and Alaska Native	123	1.0%
Asian	75	0.6%
Native Hawaiian and Other Pacific Islander	11	0.1%

2016–2020 American Community Survey

The 2016–2020 5-year American Community Survey estimates show that the median household income was $41,467 (with a margin of error of +/- $5,317) and the median family income was $70,552 (+/- $5,024). Males had a median income of $36,223 (+/- $4,176) versus $26,357 (+/- $2,963) for females. The median income for those above 16 years old was $31,747 (+/- $1,963). Approximately, 9.8% of families and 17.8% of the population were below the poverty line, including 24.6% of those under the age of 18 and 21.1% of those ages 65 or over.

Ancestry in El Dorado is 20.3% German, 11.6% Irish, 10.9% English, 2.5% French, 2.4% Scottish, 2.0% Italian, 0.4% Norwegian, 0.2% Polish, and 0.2% Sub Saharan African.

=== 2010 census ===
As of the census of 2010, there were 13,021 people, 5,227 households, and 3,277 families residing in the city. The population density was 1,469.6 inhabitants per square mile (567.4/km^{2}). There were 5,797 housing units at an average density of 654.3 per square mile (252.6/km^{2}). The racial makeup of the city was 91.8% White, 2.3% African American, 1.1% Native American, 0.4% Asian, 0.1% Pacific Islander, 1.5% from other races, and 2.9% from two or more races. Hispanic or Latino of any race were 4.7% of the population.

There were 5,227 households, of which 31.9% had children under the age of 18 living with them, 44.8% were married couples living together, 12.3% had a female householder with no husband present, 5.6% had a male householder with no wife present, and 37.3% were non-families. 31.0% of all households were made up of individuals, and 13% had someone living alone who was 65 years of age or older. The average household size was 2.39 and the average family size was 2.98.

The median age in the city was 34 years. 24.9% of residents were under the age of 18; 14.1% were between the ages of 18 and 24; 23.1% were from 25 to 44; 23.1% were from 45 to 64; and 14.9% were 65 years of age or older. The gender makeup of the city was 48.2% male and 51.8% female.

== Economy ==
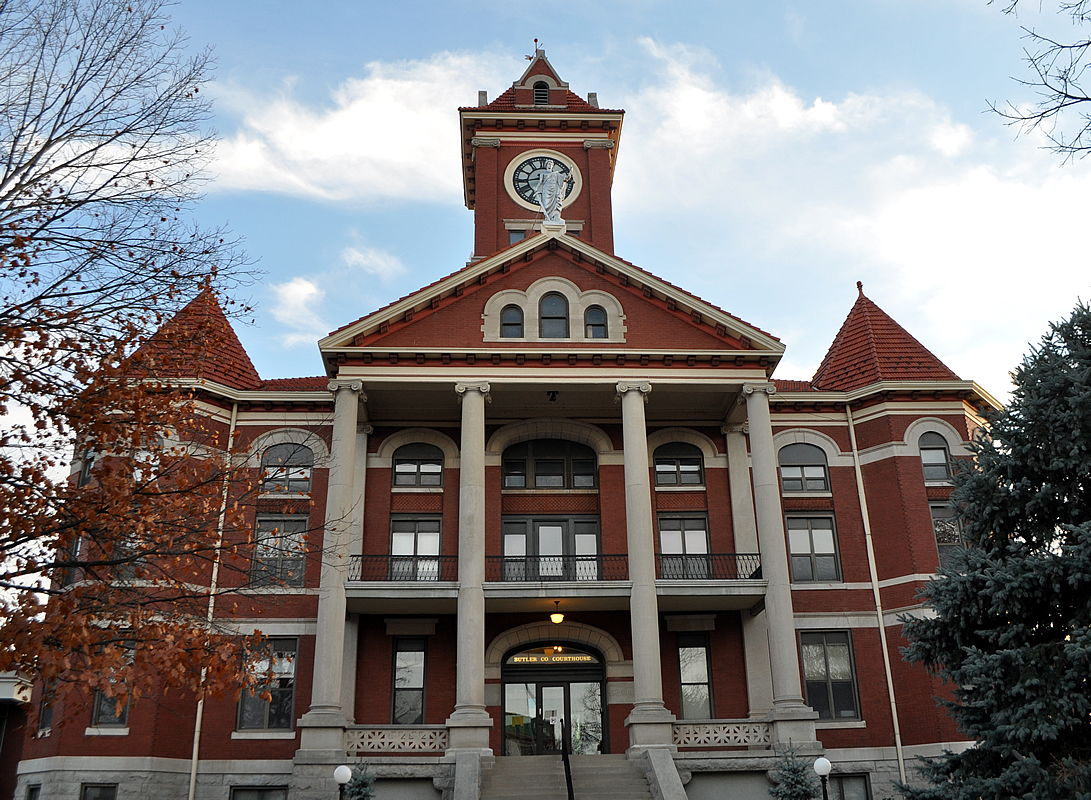
Butler County Courthouse, built 1909

The El Dorado Refinery is currently owned and operated by HollyFrontier, is situated on the southwest edge of El Dorado. It was constructed and originally owned by what would later become Skelly Oil. Later, the refinery changed hands and was rebranded after Skelly was purchased by Getty Oil, and then rebranded again after Texaco attempted to purchase Getty. In 2011 it was rebranded again when Frontier Oil and Holly Corporation merged. El Dorado Refinery is the largest in Kansas. Capacity is 135,000 barrels per day (21,500 m^{3}/d), with production split up into gasoline (55% of production); diesel and jet fuel (34% of production); and asphalt, chemicals and other refined petroleum products (11% percent of production).

== Education ==
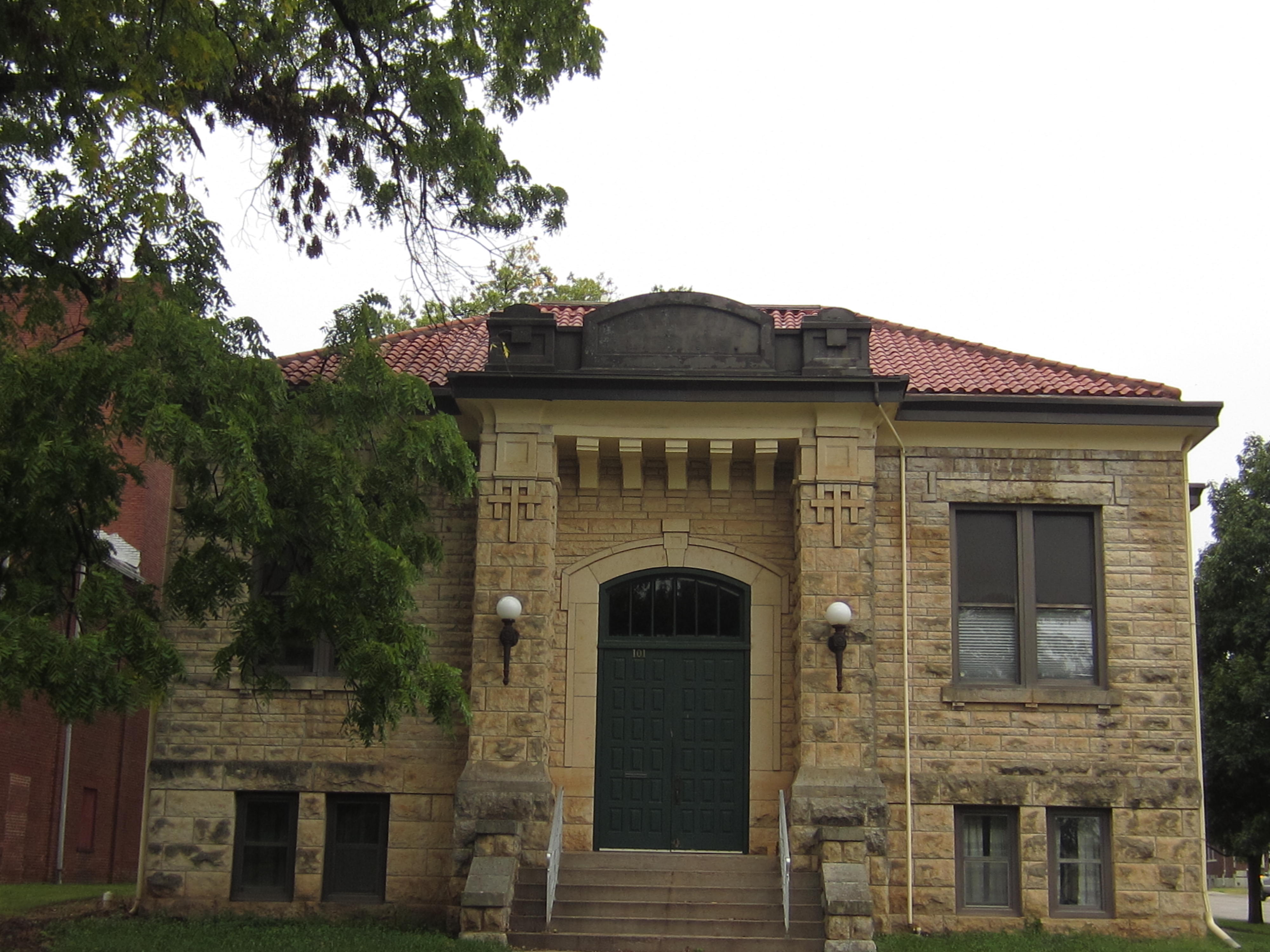
Former El Dorado Carnegie Library (2013)

El Dorado is home to Butler Community College.

Most of the community is served by El Dorado USD 490 public school district, which has one high school, one middle school, and three grade schools.

The west side of El Dorado is served by Circle USD 375 public school district, located in the city of Towanda (west of El Dorado).

== Sports ==
Butler Community College fields teams in both men's (mascot: Grizzlies) and women's (mascot: Lady Grizzlies) sports. Butler competes in the NJCAA's Jayhawk Conference, and its teams have won numerous league and national accolades. Butler's football team has won five NJCAA national championships (1981, 1998, 1999, 2003, 2007, and 2008), and also played in the NJCAA championship game in 2004 and 2010. The 1985 squad also finished the season ranked #1 nationally. The program has produced numerous NFL players, most notably Rudi Johnson. Butler's men's basketball program also has a rich tradition, including a national championship in 1953, NJCAA national tournament runners-up in 1992 and 1993, a national tournament third-place finish in 1996, seven Jayhawk Conference championships since 1990, four NJCAA players of the year, ten NJCAA All-Americans, and three NBA draft picks. Notable former Grizzlies with NBA experience include Stephen Jackson, Tony Allen, and Kasib Powell. Butler's men's and women's track and cross-country teams also have won numerous conference, regional, and national accolades.

The El Dorado Broncos were a summer amateur baseball team composed primarily of college players. The team competed within the Jayhawk League as part of the National Baseball Congress, or NBC. The Broncos have won three NBC World Series in 1996, 1998 and 2009. Several former Broncos players currently play in Major League Baseball, including Nate Robertson and Heath Bell .

== Culture ==
In April 2010, the Hot Rod Cafe (formerly the El Dorado theater on Main Street) was filmed for the documentary reality television series American Pickers episode "Easy Riders", which aired July 26, 2010.

The 1969 film The Gypsy Moths was filmed in part in El Dorado. It featured Burt Lancaster, Deborah Kerr, Gene Hackman, William Windom and Bonnie Bedelia.

Country music artist Zach Bryan references the town on the song "El Dorado" from his self-titled 2023 album.

== Parks and recreation ==
The City of El Dorado maintains an extensive parks and recreation system, including: 12 neighborhood parks, 12 playgrounds, five soccer fields, four baseball fields, four softball fields, two spray parks, two pools, two tennis courts, two outdoor basketball courts, a baseball stadium, an 18-hole disc golf course, and a 6.3 mile bike path.

In addition, the community boasts a new athletic complex. The venue was completed in 2012 by the Educational Facilities Authority of Butler County, which consists of representatives from the City of El Dorado, Butler Community College, and El Dorado USD 490 public school district. The complex provides a venue for football, soccer, track and other community events.

El Dorado State Park is also located just beyond the city limits and provides many recreational activities, such as boating, fishing, hiking, swimming, horse trails and archery.

== Media ==
=== Print ===
- Butler County Times-Gazette, local newspaper in El Dorado.
- The Wichita Eagle, major regional newspaper in Wichita.

=== Radio ===
El Dorado is served by numerous radio stations of the Wichita-Hutchinson listening market area, and satellite radio. See Media in Wichita, Kansas.

=== Television ===
El Dorado is served by over-the-air ATSC digital TV of the Wichita-Hutchinson viewing market area, cable TV, and satellite TV. See Media in Wichita, Kansas.

== Notable people ==
- Granville Pearl Aikman, Kansas state judge, attorney
- Beals Becker, major league baseball player
- Tom Borland, major league baseball pitcher
- Steve Brodie, actor
- Scioto Imhoff Danner, quilter
- Bobby Douglass, NFL football player
- Stanley Dunham, maternal grandfather of Barack Obama
- Alfred W. Ellet, Brigadier General in U.S. Civil War
- Maude Fulton, Broadway stage actress, playwright, screenwriter
- Ralph Graham, college football coach, pioneer of racial integration in college sports
- Sarah D. Grant, Arizona Court of Appeals judge, attorney
- Alex Graves, film director, television director, television producer, screenwriter
- Larry Hartshorn former NFL football player
- Roger Marshall, former United States Representative, US Senator from Kansas, obstetrician
- Marion Koogler McNay, artist, philanthropist, founder of McNay Art Museum
- Robert L. Rodgers, US Congressman
- Emily Sander, murder victim
- Almon Brown Strowger, inventor of Strowger switch
- Mort Walker, cartoonist, creator of Beetle Bailey
- William Allen White, journalist
- Gerald Burton Winrod, anti-semitic evangelist

== See also ==
- National Register of Historic Places listings in Butler County, Kansas
  - Butler County Courthouse
  - El Dorado Carnegie Library
  - El Dorado Missouri Pacific Depot
- List of oil pipelines
- List of oil refineries
