= Larry Hartshorn =

American gridiron football player (1933–2007)

- Hartshorn, circa 1964

No. 64
- Position: Offensive guard

Personal information
- Born: May 19, 1933; Oil Hill, Kansas
- Died: September 19, 2007 (aged 74); Overland Park, Kansas
- Listed height: 6 ft 0 in (1.83 m)
- Listed weight: 225 lb (102 kg)

Career information
- High school: El Dorado (El Dorado, Kansas)
- College: Kansas State

Career history
- Chicago Cardinals (1955, 1957); Calgary Stampeders (1958)
- Stats at Pro Football Reference

Larry LeRoy "Rube" Hartshorn (May 19, 1933 – September 19, 2007) was an American gridiron football player. He played prolifically in the National Football League (NFL) as an offensive guard with the Chicago Cardinals in 1955 and 1957. He later played in the Canadian Football League (CFL) with the Calgary Stampeders in 1958.

Hartshorn was born May 19, 1933, in Oil Hill, Kansas, near El Dorado, Kansas. He became a distinguished athlete at El Dorado High School, earning All State honors in football in 1950. He went on to play college football and baseball at Kansas State University from 1950 to 1954, where he was a teammate of Earl Woods.

Hartshorn's participation in the National Football League was interrupted when the U.S. Army drafted him into service. He served in the Army during 1955 and 1956 at Camp Zama, Japan, reaching the rank of Staff Sergeant. When he completed his military service, he resumed professional football.

After his years in professional football and the military, Hartshorn moved to Concordia, Kansas, to become a teacher and coach for 33 years at Concordia Junior-Senior High School, where he coached Keith Christensen. Hartshorn began the wrestling program in 1966, running it as head football coach from 1966 to 1974. He continued to serve in various coaching and education capacities until his retirement.
