= Don Dubbins =

American actor (1928–1991)

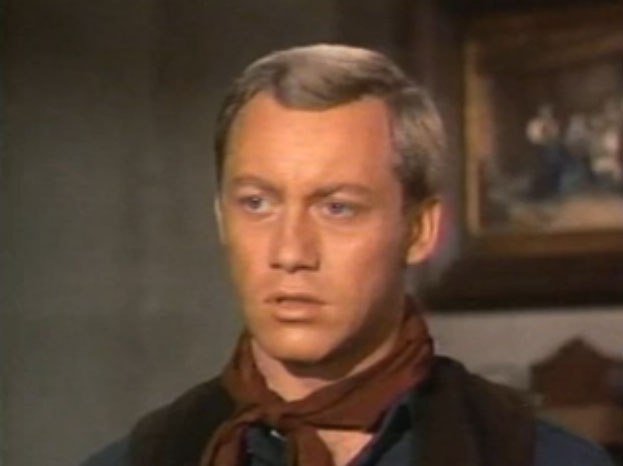
- Dubbins in Bonanza, 1960
- Born: Donald Gene Dubbins; June 28, 1928; Brooklyn, New York, U.S.
- Died: August 17, 1991 (aged 63); Greenville, South Carolina, U.S.
- Occupation: Actor
- Years active: 1951–1991
- Spouse: Jeanne Schaults Dubbins

Donald Gene Dubbins (June 28, 1928 – August 17, 1991) was an American film, stage and television actor.

== Life and career ==
Dubbins was born in Brooklyn, New York on June 28, 1928. He served in the U.S. Marine Corps during World War II. Dubbins began his career in 1953, appearing in the television series The Doctor. He also appeared in the film From Here to Eternity, where he played the uncredited role of the bugler, Private Friday Clark. Perhaps his highest-profile roles came with the western Tribute to a Bad Man and the drama These Wilder Years, both times playing alongside James Cagney.

Other film credits include The Caine Mutiny, Death Wish II, The D.I., Enchanted Island, From the Earth to the Moon, and The Illustrated Man. Later in his career, Dubbins appeared in numerous TV programs including Alfred Hitchcock Presents, Barnaby Jones, Bonanza, Dynasty, The Guns of Will Sonnett, Gunsmoke, Hunter, The Millionaire, Murder, She Wrote, Perry Mason, Petticoat Junction, Peyton Place, The Rifleman, 77 Sunset Strip, Then Came Bronson, The Twilight Zone, Voyage to the Bottom of the Sea, and Wanted: Dead or Alive. He made a number of appearances in the late 1960s reboot of Dragnet. Dubbins' last credit was a stage role in Death of a Salesman, in which he played Willy Loman.

== Death ==
Dubbins died on August 17, 1991 of cancer at St. Francis Hospital in Greenville, South Carolina, at the age of 63. He was buried in Hillcrest Memorial Gardens.

== Selected filmography ==
- From Here to Eternity (1953) as Private Friday Clark, Bugler (uncredited)
- The Caine Mutiny (1954) as Seaman First Class Urban (uncredited)
- Tribute to a Bad Man (1955) as Steve Miller
- The D.I. (1957) as Private Owens, recruit
- Alfred Hitchcock Presents (1959) (Season 4 Episode 19: "The Morning of the Bride") as Philip Pryor
- Rawhide (1959) (Season 1 Episode 14: "Incident of the Dog Days") as Billy Carter
- Sugarfoot (1959) (Season 2 Episode 15: "The Mountain") as Vic Bradley
- Sugarfoot (1959) (Season 2 Episode 16: "The Twister") as Sid Garnin
- Gunsmoke (1959) (Season 5 Episode 2: "Kitty's Injury") as Lootie
- The Twilight Zone (1960) (Season 1 Episode 20: "Elegy") as Peter Kirby
- Bonanza (1960) (Season 1 Episode 29: "Bitter Water") as Todd McCarren
- The Rifleman (1960) (Season 3 Episode 7: "The Martinet") as Ben Perry
- Gunsmoke (1961) (Season 7 Episode 9: "Milly") as Potts
- Gunsmoke (1961) (Season 7 Episode 13: "Marry Me") as Orkey Cathcart
- Perry Mason (1961–1966) (7 episodes)
- Dr. Kildare (1962) (Season 1 Episode 23: "The Witch Doctor") as Roy Tyler
- Route 66 (1963) (Season 3 Episode 21: "In the Closing of a Trunk") as Mattie Hawkes
- 77 Sunset Strip (1963) (Season 5 Episode 24: "The Man Who Wasn't There") as Pete Rix
- The Prize (1963) as Ivar Cramer, Light Henchman
- Gunsmoke (1964) (Season 9 Episode 16: "Prairie Wolfer") as Wendt
- Petticoat Junction (1964) (Season 1 Episode 37: "Kate Flat on Her Back") as Smokey Harner
- The Fugitive (1964) (Season 1 Episode 24: "Flight from the Final Demon") as Horton
- The Virginian (1965) (Season 4 Episode 13: "The Horse Fighter") as Albi
- I Dream of Jeannie (1965) (Season 1 Episode 1: "The Lady in the Bottle") as Lieutenant Pete Conway, US Naval Reserve
- The Fugitive (1966) (Season 4 Episode 10: "Nobody Loses All the Time") as McCaffrey
- Voyage to the Bottom of the Sea (1967) (Season 4 Episode 9: "Rescue") as C.P.O. Beach
- Dragnet (1967) (Season 1 Episode 2: "The Big Explosion") as Donald L. Chapman
- Dragnet (1967) (Season 2 Episode 9: "The Big Ad") as Steve Deal
- Dragnet (1968) (Season 2 Episode 21: "The Big Clan") as Billy Catcher
- Dragnet (1969) (Season 3 Episode 16: "Narcotics: DR-21") as Bob Buesing
- Dragnet (1969) (Season 4 Episode 6: "Juvenile: The Little Pusher") as Thomas Shore
- I Dream of Jeannie (1970) (Season 5 Episode 23: "An Astronaut in Sheep's Clothing") as Commander Jay Russell
- Mannix (1970) (Season 4 Episode 7: "The Other Game in Town") as Chris Allison
- The Mod Squad (1970) (Season 2 Episode 21: "The Deadly Sin") as Teddy Capp
- The Mod Squad (1972) (Season 4 Episode 17: "Kill Gently, Sweet Jessie") as Leonard Gault
- Adam-12 (1973) (Season 5 Episode 20: "Suspended") as Officer Steve Tyson
- Kung Fu (1973) (Season 1 Episode 12: "Superstition") as Meador
- Barnaby Jones (1973) (Season 1 Episode 9: "Some See Evil... Do Some Evil") as Emory Brandon
- Barnaby Jones (1974) (Season 3 Episode 4: "Conspiracy of Terror") as John Riley
- Cannon (1974) (Season 4 Episode 9: "Flashpoint") as Harry Fryer
- Barnaby Jones (1977) (Season 5 Episode 23: "The Inside Man") as Bill Hummel
- Barnaby Jones (1977) (Season 6 Episode 11: "The Devil's Handmaiden") as Sheriff Mason
- Barnaby Jones (1978) (Season 7 Episode 2: "A Dangerous Affair") as Frank Auburn
- The Rockford Files (1978) (Season 4 Episode 18: "South by Southeast") as Agent Frazee
- Fantasy Island (1978) (Season 1 Episode 14: "King for a Day/Instant Family") as Dr. Sidney Block
- The Incredible Hulk (1979) (Season 3 Episode 2: "Blind Rage") as Sergeant Murkland
- Death Wish II (1982) as Mike
- Mork & Mindy (1982) (Season 4 Episode 20: "Gotta Run: Part 2") as Secretary General
- Trapper John, M.D. (1983) (Season 4 Episode 17: "The Spy Who Bugged Me") as Mr. Williams
- Murder, She Wrote (1985) (Season 1 Episode 13: "My Johnny Lies Over the Ocean") as Dr. Carmichael
- Highway to Heaven (1985) (Season 1 Episode 16: "Going Home, Going Home") as Don Weston
- Highway to Heaven (1985) (Season 1 Episode 17: "As Difficult as ABC") as Don Weston
- Hunter (1987) (Season 4 Episode 1: "Not Just Another John Doe") as John
