= Old Ramon (novel) =

1960 book by Jack Schaefer

- Title page for Old Ramon (1960)
- Author: Jack Schaefer
- Illustrator: Harold West
- Language: English
- Genre: Children's novel
- Publisher: Houghton Mifflin Harcourt
- Publication date: 1960
- Publication place: United States
- Media type: Print (Paperback)
- Pages: 113
- ISBN: 9780826357649

Old Ramon is a 1960 children's novel by Jack Schaefer. It follows a young boy who spends a summer herding sheep through the American southwest, accompanied by the title character, an elderly shepherd; a burro; and two sheep dogs. The book was a Newbery Honor book in 1961 and won the ALA's Aurianne Award in 1962.

== Plot summary ==
A young boy is sent by his father to learn from Old Ramon, an elderly shepherd. Accompanying Ramon are Sancho, a young and inexperienced dog, Pedro, an experienced sheep dog who has traveled with Ramon for many years, and a donkey. Ramon has a reputation for never losing lambs and returning herds fat and well-fleeced. Ramon explains sheep and sheep herding to the boy, and after grazing the herd for the day, the pair camp for the night. Sancho befriends the boy, and Old Ramon tells the boy the dog is now his.

The next day, while fording a river, Pedro's inexperience causes part of the flock to stampede, and Ramon has to rescue two sheep from drowning. Ramon directs the boy to lead the flock for the rest of the day, hoping that he will learn better by doing than by watching.

At camp that night, Ramon shows the boy how to remove sheep ticks using tobacco smoke by blowing smoke into the wool. After eating, the two flip a coin to decide who will clean the dishes, and the old man wins after calling heads. As the boy gathers the dishes to clean them, Ramon reveals he cheated the boy, as the coin has heads on both sides, and instead cleans the dishes himself.

The next day, while waiting for the heat to abate, the old man tells the boy about the time the boy's grandfather and Ramon drove sheep through the Mojave desert. Traveling many days, the two men slowly run out of water, and sheep and sheep dogs die along the way. The two friends struggle onward through the desert, leaving the flock behind, and eventually drag themselves to a small stream. The last remaining dog, the grandfather of Poncho, reunites with the two men, leading the flock to the water. After recovering, the men travel to the Sierra Nevada where the boy's grandfather sells the sheep, which belonged to him; despite this, his grandfather splits the profits with Ramon.

While grazing, the sheep become alarmed at a rattlesnake. Sancho rushes toward the snake, and Ramon kicks him out of the way. He breaks the snake's neck with his crook, then beats it to death. The boy refuses when Ramon offers him the rattles and laments Sancho's kicking. Ramon explains that there are times when quick action is needed, and Sancho needed protection from himself. Later, the boy asks for and receives the rattles.

The shepherds are caught in a chorro the next day and seek shelter until the storm passes. Ramon tells a story about a time he teased a buffalo: sitting atop a hill, Ramon rolled a rock down the hill and hit a buffalo; the buffalo charged Ramon, who evaded by running around the hill for so long the buffalo's right legs stretched out, preventing it from running straight to catch Ramon as he ran away. The boy is incredulous. The storm abates, and Sancho returns with three sheep lost during the storm. Later, the boy asks how Ramon kept his own leg from stretching, and he replies that he kept switching directions while being chased around the hill.

During their night rest, a lone coyote howls, arousing the boy's fear. Sancho barks back, and Ramon reassures the boy that a lone coyote is nothing to fear. Unable to sleep, the boy asks Ramon if he has always tended sheep, and Ramon says no. He worked for a time driving cows and a wagon after an incident while working for the boy's grandfather when he got drunk and passed out during lambing season and woke the next morning to seven dead lambs that had been trampled in the night. Ramon fled, too embarrassed to face the boys' grandfather. Ramon eventually returned to the grandfather's ranch, where he was told by the ranch boss that his friend died after a horse fell on him, and he is not welcome there. The boy's father, who now owns the ranch, comes and forgives Ramon, reminding Ramon of the journey with his father through the desert years before.

After falling asleep, the pair is awoken by the flock being attacked by a wolf. Ramon retrieves his gun and shoots the wolf, which escapes in the night, and the flock is unharmed. Returning to camp, the two find Sancho dead, his throat ripped out by the wolf. Distraught at Sancho's death, the boy lashes out when Pedro approaches to comfort him, hitting the dog and calling the dog a coward for leaving Sancho to fight the wolf alone. Ramon tells the boy to feel Pacho's stomach, which is scarred from a grizzly attack: while traveling through the mountains, Ramon and Pedro came across a bear; Ramon dropped his gun, and Pedro came and held off the bear until Ramon could shoot it, but not before being clawed in the stomach.

Remembering Pedro sired a litter of puppies at a farm to the south, Ramon decides to change their course, saying "for the son of my patrón, the son of my dog". The boy decides he will call this new dog Sancho.
