= Janice Carroll =

American actress (1932–1993)

- Carroll in Guestward, Ho!, 1960
- Born: February 19, 1932; Hollywood, California, U.S.
- Died: September 10, 1993 (aged 61); San Fernando Valley, California, U.S.
- Occupation: Actress
- Years active: 1951–1987

Janice Carroll (born Janice Marie Slack; February 9, 1932 – September 10, 1993) was an American actress, who played in nearly 60 films, plays, and television series that include: Simon & Simon, The Blue and the Gray, Quincy M.E., The Rockford Files, Barnaby Jones, Little House on the Prairie, The Waltons, Miracle on 34th Street, Mister Ed, Daddy Long Legs, Shane, How to Succeed in Business Without Really Trying, and many others.

== Filmography ==
Year	Title	Role	Notes
1951	Bannerline	Garden Club Member	Uncredited
1953	Shane	Susan Lewis	
1953	Stalag 17	Russian Woman Prisoner	Uncredited
1955	Daddy Long Legs	Athletic Girl Dancer	Uncredited
1955	How to Be Very, Very Popular	Burlesque Dancer	
1955	The Virgin Queen	Serving Maid	Uncredited
1956	The Lieutenant Wore Skirts	WAAF sergeant	
1956	The Catered Affair	Mrs. Casey's Daughter-in-law	Uncredited
1964	My Three Sons	Nurse	Season 4 Episode 19
1967	How to Succeed in Business Without Really Trying	Brenda	
1969	The April Fools	Mimsy Shrader	
1970	The Odd Couple (TV series)	Ms. Granger	Season 1 Episode 9
1974	How to Seduce a Woman	Estelle	
1974	Three the Hard Way	Nurse	
1976	Baa Baa Black Sheep	Captain Delmonte (Marine Nurse)	
1978	The End	Ballet Teacher	
1979	Hardcore	Waitress	
1981	The Incredible Shrinking Woman	TV Commercial Actress	
1983	Second Thoughts	Head Nurse	
