= El Dorado Carnegie Library =

- U.S. National Register of Historic Places
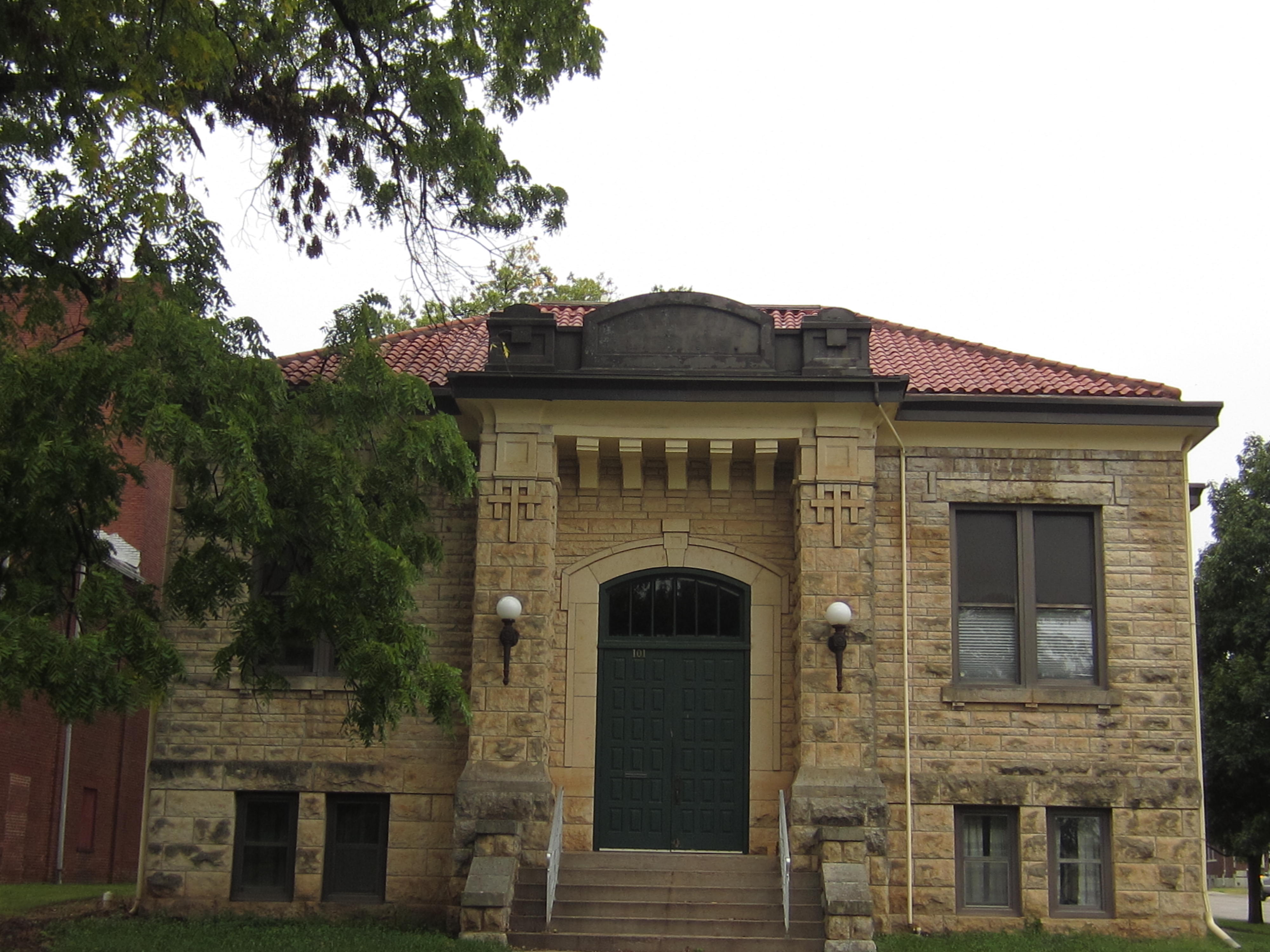

- Location within Kansas Location within the United States
- Location: 101 S Star, El Dorado, Kansas
- Coordinates: 37°49′01.82″N 96°51′10.53″W
- Built: 1912
- Architect: John F. Stanton
- Architectural style: Classical Revival
- NRHP reference No.: 87000931
- Added to NRHP: June 25, 1987

The El Dorado Carnegie Library is a former public library, constructed in 1912, in El Dorado, Kansas. It was designed by architect John F. Stanton. In 1959, a new library was built in El Dorado; the original was eventually purchased privately and in the 1980s it was renovated and converted into private offices: from 2002, an architectural firm. It was added to the National Register of Historic Places in 1987.

== See also ==
- National Register of Historic Places listings in Butler County, Kansas
