= Murder of Emily Sander =

2007 murder in El Dorado, Kansas

Emily Irene Sander
- Born: Emily Irene Sander; February 26, 1989; Olathe, Kansas
- Disappeared: November 23, 2007; El Dorado, Kansas
- Died: November 24, 2007 (aged 18); El Dorado, Kansas
- Cause of death: Rape & Murder
- Body discovered: November 29, 2007
- Other name: Zoey Zane

Emily Irene Sander (February 26, 1989 – November 24, 2007) was an 18-year-old student at Butler Community College in El Dorado, Kansas, United States, who was reported missing on November 23, 2007 and found dead six days later. Her disappearance was widely covered in the mainstream news media. Israel Mireles was named as a suspect; he was arrested in Mexico and in February 2010 found guilty of her murder.

== Disappearance ==
According to police, Sander and a man they identified as 24-year-old Israel Mireles were seen leaving a bar in east El Dorado on November 23, 2007. This was the last time Sander was seen alive. Later, blood was discovered in Mireles' motel room next door to an Italian restaurant where he worked as a waiter and Sander's car was found still parked at the bar. The rental car Mireles was driving was found abandoned on November 27 in Vernon, Texas, where he has relatives.

Six days after Sander's disappearance, on November 29, investigators found a body 50 miles (80 km) east of El Dorado, later confirmed to be Sander's. An autopsy was performed, but the results and cause of death were sealed until the trial, when it was revealed that she had been stabbed multiple times and strangled to death with a telephone cord.

== Apprehension ==
El Dorado Police Chief Tom Boren said that a special task force of FBI and Kansas Bureau of Investigation agents was assigned to the case. On December 19, 2007, local police apprehended Mireles in Santa Rosa de Múzquiz, Múzquiz, Mexico. He was subsequently charged in the U.S. with capital murder, rape, and aggravated sodomy. When captured, he was with his 16-year-old pregnant girlfriend, Victoria Martens. Although prosecutors promised not to file charges against her, she initially refused to return to Kansas.

According to Victoria Martens' mother, Sandy Martens, her daughter had called her on November 24 to tell her Mireles had been involved in an altercation when another man attempted to rob him, and her daughter had also sent her a text message days after the couple fled saying she "had a lot to tell her mother". Sandy Martens later said she believed her daughter thought the trip with Mireles to Mexico was a vacation. Victoria Martens later called home and was picked up at the border and taken to Texas, where she was put in juvenile custody. Mireles was suspected of impregnating her and also charged with aggravated indecent liberties with a child.

Mireles was a Mexican citizen who had been in the United States legally and had returned to his home country. A potential complication of the case was that before extraditing a suspect, Mexico requires that authorities submit the most serious charges that the suspect could face, and will not allow extradition of someone who could face the death penalty, thus the maximum penalty Mireles could have faced was life in prison without the possibility of parole; By June 26, 2009, he was extradited to the US.

== Trial ==
Mireles' trial on charges of capital murder, rape and aggravated criminal sodomy was held from February 8 to 12, 2010. He was convicted of rape and capital murder; the aggravated sodomy charge was dropped as part of the capital murder charge. On March 31, 2010, he was sentenced to life in prison without the possibility of parole.

In 2013, Mireles appealed to the Kansas Supreme Court requesting a new trial; the court upheld his conviction.

== Career as a pornographic model ==
After several days of speculation following her disappearance, it was revealed that in addition to being a secretary, Emily Sander worked as an Internet pornography model using the pseudonym Zoey Zane.

Friends said she had been recruited for an internet porn site in summer 2007, shortly after her 18th birthday. She apparently had kept her career mostly to herself and only close friends knew about it.

Investigators said they did not believe that Sander's involvement in porn was connected with her disappearance. A statement on the Zoey Zane porn site criticized the media, saying they had blown Sander's porn career out of proportion and that it was a shame that the site drew more viewers after her death than it had drawn previously. The site was later redirected to an online memorial for Sander.

== Aftermath ==
A vigil was held for Sander at Butler Community College. Her funeral took place on December 6, 2007.
