= Scioto Imhoff Danner =

American quilter (1891–1974)

Scioto Imhoff Danner (June 16, 1891 – March 6, 1974) was an American quilter who designed and created quilts and then built a business selling patterns and books she had written. While her quilts were renown in their own right, her business (based in El Dorado, Kansas) of packaging and selling quilt patterns globally, earned recognition for her unique quilt patterns. She published 'Mrs Danner's Quilts', a guide to her patterns.

Some of her patterns have become recognized globally and include "Double Wedding Ring", "Prince's Feather", "Wedgewood", and "Field of Daisies".

Quilts she made are in the collection of the International Quilt Museum.

Danner was the editor of Land o' Nod, a monthly quilting magazine.

Her quilts were depicted by other artists for the Index of American Design, a Federal Art Project.
