= The Gypsy Moths =

1969 film by John Frankenheimer

- The Gypsy Moths Movie poster
- Directed by: John Frankenheimer
- Screenplay by: William Hanley
- Based on: The Gypsy Moths; 1955 novel by James Drought
- Produced by: Hal Landers; Bobby Roberts; Edward Lewis (executive)
- Starring: Burt Lancaster; Deborah Kerr; Gene Hackman; Scott Wilson
- Cinematography: Philip H. Lathrop
- Edited by: Henry Berman
- Music by: Elmer Bernstein
- Production companies: Edward Lewis Productions; John Frankenheimer Productions; Landers-Roberts Productions
- Distributed by: Metro-Goldwyn-Mayer
- Release date: August 28, 1969
- Running time: 107 min./110 min.
- Country: United States
- Language: English

The Gypsy Moths is a 1969 American drama film, based on the 1955 novel of the same name by James Drought and directed by John Frankenheimer. The film tells the story of three barnstorming skydivers and their effect on a Midwestern American town, focusing on the differences in values between the town folk and the hard-living skydivers.

The Gypsy Moths stars Burt Lancaster and Deborah Kerr. The film also features Gene Hackman, and Bonnie Bedelia in her first film role. Kerr had worked previously with Lancaster in From Here to Eternity (1953) and Separate Tables (1958). The film had the only nude love scene in her film career. Elmer Bernstein composed the score.

== Plot ==
A skydiving team called the Gypsy Moths visits a small town in Kansas (Benton) to put on a show for the Fourth of July weekend. Their leader, Mike Rettig, is accompanied by his partners, Joe Browdy and Malcolm Webson.

The skydivers stay at the home of Malcolm's uncle and aunt, John and Elizabeth Brandon. Mike becomes romantically involved with Elizabeth, and her husband overhears them having sex. Malcolm falls for local student Annie Burke, a boarder in the Brandon house, while Joe takes an interest in a topless dancer.

Mike eventually asks Elizabeth to leave town with him, but she declines. During the next skydiving exhibition, Mike performs a spectacular "cape jump" stunt but fails to pull the ripcord, intentionally falling to his death. Although nobody wants to discuss it, they suspect that he committed suicide. That night, Annie consoles Malcolm, and they kiss. Before the team leaves for good, they have to bury Mike. To pay for the funeral, Malcolm does the same stunt that killed Mike. He leaves by train that night, without attending Mike's funeral.

== Cast ==
- Burt Lancaster as Mike Rettig
- Deborah Kerr as Elizabeth Brandon
- Gene Hackman as Joe Browdy
- Scott Wilson as Malcolm Webson
- William Windom as John Brandon
- Bonnie Bedelia as Annie Burke
- Sheree North as the Waitress
- Carl Reindel as Pilot
- Ford Rainey as Stand Owner
- John Napier as Dick Donford

== Production ==
James William Drought's 1955 novel, The Gypsy Moths – A Fable, was originally acquired by Kirk Douglas and Edward Lewis' film production company Douglas and Lewis Productions in April 1966. The plan was for Douglas to play the lead and the partners immediately hired David Heilweil to write the screenplay. John Frankenheimer, who had been directing and co-producing films in partnership with Douglas and Lewis since 1962 through his own film production company, John Frankenheimer Productions, was to direct the film from the start.

After Douglas and Lewis broke off their partnership in December 1966 (after eleven years of working together), Lewis formed his own film production company, Edward Lewis Productions, and took with him several of the properties that he had acquired and developed with Frankenheimer. In January 1967, Lewis and Frankenheimer announced that they had together signed a four-picture financing and distribution deal with Metro-Goldwyn-Mayer, for a co-production deal between Edward Lewis Productions and John Frankenheimer Productions, including The Gypsy Moths. The screenplay had been re-written by William Hanley and the film was to be co-produced by Hal Landers and Bobby Roberts (who formed their own film production company Landers-Roberts Productions), directed by Frankenheimer and with Lewis functioning as executive producer.

In September 1967, Burt Lancaster was announced as the lead and the film was scheduled to be filmed in the Midwest starting in May 1968. John Phillip Law was originally in the cast, but Scott Wilson replaced him after Law broke his wrist.

The aerial sequences in The Gypsy Moths were filmed at locations in and around Benton, Kansas, with a Howard DGA-15 (N22418) used as the jump ship, flown by David Llorente and Larry Perkins. After decoding the "DGA" designation of the aircraft, Browdy (Gene Hackman) jokes that "You're much better off jumping out of it, than taking a chance on landing it."

At the time, the sport of skydiving was in its infancy, yet the film featured an extreme variation of the sport, the use of "batwings", a precursor to modern wingsuit flying. Jerry Rouillard was a key technical advisor and stunt double for Lancaster. Carl Boenish and Jay Gifford were responsible for the aerial photography, including photographing the jumps with a 35 mm camera mounted on their helmets, while they jumped with the stunt doubles, a team of a half dozen skydivers; Mike Milts, Garth Taggart, Russ Benefiel, Dave Thompson, Bill Ledbetter and Jerry Rouillard.

== Reception ==
The Gypsy Moths ran in limited release in the U.S., with few theaters giving it extended showings. Frankenheimer was depressed and felt that a recent management change at Metro-Goldwyn-Mayer resulted in the film only being partially re-edited "so it could debut at family-friendly Radio City Music Hall, where it promptly bombed. Only in Hollywood could dealing with clueless studio executives be more frightening than jumping out of an airplane into free fall."

In his review for The New York Times, Vincent Canby noted that The Gypsy Moths had the semblance of an "action film," but "if this were a real action movie, I would be required to do little except look up at the sky and squint. Unfortunately, there isn't that much skydiving."

Gene Siskel was mostly critical: "John Frankenheimer...is once again to be credited with superb action photography....But when Frankenheimer's parachutists get down to earth, the film falls apart....in commercial films, the producers feel they must create a human side for the athlete. And so Frankenheimer tries to inveigle us into caring about three only hinted-at love relationships. Most of the footage of these affairs must be on a cutting room floor, because as they stand, their brevity is ludicrous....When Deborah Kerr, who plays opposite Lancaster, meets the three men she says, 'I think you are all subtle, but in a direct sort of way.' 'The Gypsy Moths' is about as stimulating as Miss Kerr's fuzzy remark."

The Albany Times-Union review began by citing the Kerr-Lancaster parallel from From Here to Eternity: "Now, 15 years later, [the two] have another love scene but this one is compatible with the new freedom as the audience is introduced to the actors free of their swim suits. For Miss Kerr to engage in a love scene in Jones' movie was a departure from her former roles, and thus it caused a stir. In 'The Gypsy Moths' her explicit nude scene takes her a step further, even to the brink of being the most mature (almost said oldest) featured actress to disrobe for the cameras....of the two sequences, the earlier was far more successful. Two highly disciplined persons...abandon their stations for a brief fling, and their embrace on the beach says it all....It was brief and it told the story without any need for nudity or more explicit action. John Frankenheimer falls victim to the current trend. The nude scene isn't needed....The two actors have set the tone of the scene and have created the empathy between the two characters so that the audience can take the scene to its conclusion without assistance from the director. The nude scene is extraneous and slows up the rhythm of the film at that point. Proof that this excess footage is the revelation that when 'The Gypsy Moths' played Radio City Music Hall the nude love scene and portions of the topless go-go bar scene were deleted without any loss of value to the film. It had an 'M' rating in New York, but with the addition of the two scenes is playing with an 'R' rating, a real disservice to the film. Actually, the film is well-made and benefits from some very good performances....In addition to the acting of Lancaster and Miss Kerr, there is a wonderful performance by Gene Hackman who makes a supporting role the most complete character in the film....Scott Wilson's performance as the youngest member of the trio...is a compelling piece of work....And Frankenheimer gains a delightful performance from Sheree North, the busty but tarnished waitress-dancer. She matches Hackman's expansive acting stride for stride as the two move towards an assignation."

After its initial showings, the film was lengthened to 110 minutes and the rating changed to M for mature audiences. This rating was an early version of the later PG. As soon as it appeared, The Gypsy Moths disappeared. Director Frankenheimer claimed the film did not get the same attention as his thrillers, like Seconds (1966) and The Manchurian Candidate (1962). Despite this, he would call The Gypsy Moths one of his two favorite films.

The Gypsy Moths was widely seen in Australia, with a local skydiving fraternity quick to seize the opportunity to promote their sport, showing a 16 mm print at many club meetings.

In 2025, The Hollywood Reporter listed The Gypsy Moths as having the best stunts of 1969.

== See also ==
- List of American films of 1969

== Bibliography ==
- Armstrong, Stephen B. John Frankenheimer: Interviews, Essays, and Profiles. Washington D.C.: Rowman & Littlefield, 2013. ISBN 9780810890572.
- Bushell, Sue J. "Some Damn Good Airplanes." Air Enthusiast, Thirty-two, December 1986-April 1987. Bromley, UK: Pilot Press, pp. 32–44.
- Capua, Michelangelo. Deborah Kerr: A Biography. Jefferson, North Carolina: McFarland & Company, 2010. ISBN 9780786458820.
- Champlin, Charles. John Frankenheimer: A Conversation with Charles Champlin. Ashland, Oregon: Riverwood Press, 1995. ISBN 9781880756133.
- Rouillard, Jerry. "Will the REAL 'Gypsy Moths' Please Stand Up?," Parachutist magazine, November 1969, pp. 10–12.
