= Shane (American TV series) =

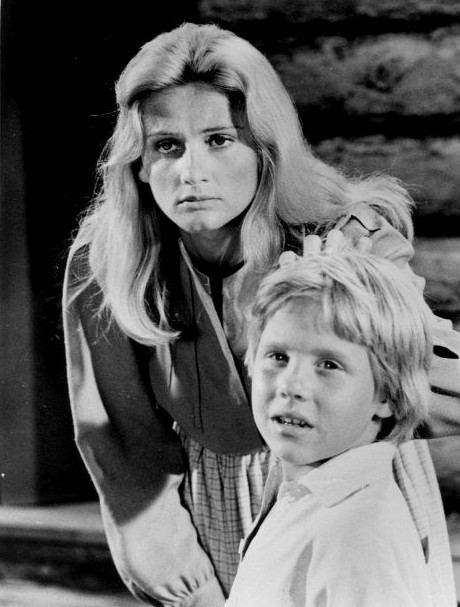
- Jill Ireland as Marian Starett and Chris Shea as her son Joey.
- Genre: Western
- Written by: William Blinn; Ernest Kinoy; Denne Bart Petitclerc; David Shaw
- Directed by: Alex March; David Greene; Gerd Oswald; Gerald Mayer
- Starring: David Carradine; Jill Ireland; Tom Tully; Chris Shea
- Theme music composer: Victor Young
- Composer: Jerry Fielding
- Country of origin: United States
- Original language: English
- No. of seasons: 1
- No. of episodes: 17

Production
- Executive producer: David Shaw
- Producers: Herbert Brodkin; Denne Bart Petitclerc
- Running time: 1 hr.
- Production company: Titus Productions

Original release
- Network: ABC
- Release: September 10 – December 31, 1966

Shane is an American Western television series which aired on ABC in 1966. It was based on the 1949 book of the same name by Jack Schaefer and the 1953 classic film starring Alan Ladd. David Carradine portrayed the titular character in the television series, a former gunfighter and sometimes outlaw who takes a job as a hired hand at the ranch of a widowed woman, her son, and her father-in-law.

== Premise ==
The series follows the 1953 film in its general premise, even in the lead character's buckskin shirt and concho gun belt, but departs from it in several important aspects:

The Shane, Marian, and Joey characters are much younger; Marian is a widow who lives with her father-in-law Tom, and Shane has lived with them for a while already when the story starts. That is the basis for a romance subplot that constitutes the arc of the whole series; nearly every person who meets them supposes Shane and Marian are a couple. Her father-in-law approves it, and the boy Joey idolizes Shane. However, as she doesn't dare to give the first step (even less when Shane is a man who gives no hint of any romantic interest), and he sees himself as the least desirable suitor Marian could ever have, their mutual feelings aren't expressed.

Despite his wish to leave that part of his life behind, Shane resorts to his gun often, which prompts Tom Starett's comment that he is as addicted to it as Tom himself is addicted to alcohol. That also means that the homesteaders tend to see him as a defender as much as a danger.

The action happens around a settlement called Crossroads, which has no law officer, judge, or physician. For that reason Sam Grafton is a more important character, functioning as everybody's counselor, and even as an emergency surgeon. His helper Ben is also a more defined and comical character than in the movie.

Rufe Ryker, the open-range cattleman, alive here until the end of the series, has his own dramatic arc: he starts as an absolute enemy of the "sodbusters", as evil and ruthless as in the movie. Later, he becomes the occasional ally of Shane or the homesteaders when his interests are affected or a common danger approaches; also, given the strength he has by his team of cowhands, he functions as a law enforcer. The character evolves to the point that at the end he is an acceptable suitor for Marian's hand. Bert Freed as Ryker started the season clean-shaven and let his beard grow from week to week, never shaving throughout the rest of the series, adding a rather unique element of verisimilitude.

== Cast ==
- David Carradine as Shane
- Jill Ireland as Marian Starett
- Chris Shea as Joey Starett
- Tom Tully as Tom Starett
- Bert Freed as Rufe Ryker
- Sam Gilman as Grafton
- Owen Bush as Ben
- Lawrence Mann as Harve
- Ned Romero as Chips

=== Cast comparison ===
| Character | 1953 movie | 1966 TV series |
|---|---|---|
| Shane | Alan Ladd | David Carradine |
| Marian Starett | Jean Arthur | Jill Ireland |
| Joey Starett | Brandon deWilde | Chris Shea |
| Rufe Ryker | Emile Meyer | Bert Freed |
| Sam Grafton | Paul McVey | Sam Gilman |

== Production ==
The series was shot at the Paramount Studios and the Paramount Ranch, California, unlike the 1953 movie, whose exteriors were shot in Wyoming. That makes the characters be seen carrying slickers on their saddles while riding in a rather dry landscape.

In 1966, after Paramount sold the rights to ABC, the TV company got Herbert Brodkin and his Titus Productions, Inc. Brodkin offered the producer job to Denne Bart Petitclerc, with David Shaw as executive producer; William Blinn was offered the job of story editor (credited as story consultant).

According to Blinn, as Brodkin came from the experience of shows shot in interiors like The Defenders, The Nurses and Coronet Blue, Shane rarely went on location and was a minimalist western of sorts because the Brodkin organization would not permit any deficit spending. Still, Brodkin gave the series his characteristic quality of production, strong characterizations, and stories that asked the audience to think.

The biggest problem Shane faced was the inevitable comparison to the 1953 movie; the greatest asset they had to overcome that obstacle was the casting of David Carradine: "David was kind of that character. He's got his own rhythms, he's got his own stance and attitude and point of view, and that's a good and creative thing to do," stated Blinn. Also, the quality of the show rested on team effort, with the inclusion of the cast in story conferences, the hiring of talented directors like Robert Butler or David Greene, and writers as Ernest Kinoy.

Toward the cancellation of the series, the Brodkin organization cut back the budget drastically; according to Blinn, what doomed the series was ABC asking for more action, and Brodkin refusing, arguing the need to stay within the assigned budget, and doing the show in his own way. Also, the low ratings were decisive: Shane had been put in the time slot of the Saturday nights, opposite The Jackie Gleason Show, one of the most popular TV programs of the time.

== Episode list ==
| No. in season | Title | Directed by | Written by | Original release date |
|---|---|---|---|---|
| 1 | "The Distant Bell" | Robert Butler | David Shaw | September 10, 1966 |
Marian and other settlers hire schoolteacher Amy Sloate to educate their children, but Ryker insists that he will not allow a school in the community. With Karl Lukas as Howell, Del Ford as Bobby, and Diane Ladd as Amy Sloate.
| 2 | "The Hant" | Gerald Mayer | Ernest Kinoy | September 17, 1966 |
A sad old man whose son was killed by Shane four years ago during his days as a gunfighter, comes to make him an unexpected offer. The fact that he had forgotten the incident, makes Shane physically ill. With Carl Reindel as Jed Andrews, and John Qualen as the Old Man.
| 3 | "The Wild Geese" | Herschel Daugherty | Richard McDonagh | September 24, 1966 |
When Ryker's cattle trample the Staretts' crops, Shane contemplates returning to his old profession as a gunfighter as a means of earning money needed for the farm's survival. With Bill Smithers as Del Packard, Bill Fletcher as Wynn Truscott, Allen Jaffe as Casey Driscoll, and Don Gordon as Johnny Wake.
| 4 | "An Echo of Anger" | Gary Nelson | Story by : Peter Nasco; Teleplay by : Robert Hardin | October 1, 1966 |
Four men who insist, despite Shane's denial, that he fatally shot a member of their family, arrive to kill him. Tom Starett and Ryker line by his side. With Phil Chambers as Ned, Cliff Osmond as Joshua Spicer, Charles Kuenstle as Boon Spicer, Richard Evans as J. D. Spicer, and Warren Oates as Kemp Spicer.
| 5 | "The Bitter, the Lonely" | Gerd Oswald | John Tanner | October 8, 1966 |
A cowboy, angry because "sodbusters" are moving into the land, takes a job with the Staretts out of necessity, and then with Ryker. His ways could be too wild even for him. With Steve Ihnat as R. G. Posey.
| 6 | "Killer in the Valley" | Don McDougall | Ellen M. Violett | October 15, 1966 |
In the countryside, Shane and Marian come upon a sick couple. When Marian comes down with the disease, Shane does everything possible to get the medicine she needs, while an unscrupulous seller only looks for profit. With George Keymas as Danko, Robert Hoy as Billy Cain, Paul Grant as Matthew Eberle, and Joseph Campanella as Barney Lucas.
| 7 | "Day of the Hawk" | Jud Taylor | Barbara Torgan & William Blinn | October 22, 1966 |
A minister attempts to prevent a battle after a pair of Ryker's cowhands caused the death of a farmer's wife. When his efforts result in another death, the minister turns to Shane for help. With James Whitmore as Rev. Harry Himber.
| 8 | "The Other Image" | Jeffrey Hayden | Ellen M. Violett | October 29, 1966 |
Marian receives the visit of Warren Eliot, an old boyfriend. Then, Marian finds herself having to decide rather she and Joey should stay or go back East with Warren, leaving behind Shane and her father-in-law. With Robert Brown as Warren Eliot.
| 9 | "Poor Tom's A-Cold" | Gerd Oswald | Ernest Kinoy | November 5, 1966 |
When two of Tom Gary's animals die from drinking poison water, he believes Ryker is behind it. Before long, Tom's anger and frustration drive him mad. He begins shooting at people. Shane and Ryker set out to stop him before he kills someone. With Phyllis Love as Ada Gary, and Robert Duvall as Tom Gary.
| 10 | "High Road to Viator" | Marc Daniels | William Blinn | November 12, 1966 |
Shane does everything he can to make sure Marian gets to a special dance. He convinces Ryker to leave the family's homestead alone while they are gone, drives the family three days to the city where the dance is to be held, and fights Indians after they steal Marian's dress. With Anne Morrell as the Young Indian Woman, and X. Brands as the Young Brave.
| 11 | "The Day the Wolf Laughed" | Gerald Mayer | Denne Bart Petitclerc | November 19, 1966 |
A gang of outlaws rides into town causing so much trouble that Grafton sends for Ryker, but Shane asks him to let the men have their fun, pay for the damages, and ride out. Shane and the head outlaw know each other, and their mentor told them they would kill each other some day. With Skip Homeier as Augie, and J. D. Cannon as Reno.
| 12 | "The Silent Gift" | Alex March | Ronald M. Cohen | November 26, 1966 |
Shane agrees to work for Ryker for a month in exchange for a colt for Joey. However, the foreman isn't too fond of the new hired hand and makes life hard for Shane. With J. Pat O'Malley as Jingles, and Jack Ging as Kyle.
| 13 | "A Long Night of Mourning" | Alex March | David Shaw | December 3, 1966 |
A woman arrives in town, claiming to be an old acquaintance of Tom's. She is a secret from his past, the reason he isn't a judge anymore. The woman is out for revenge, and Shane may be unable to stop her. With Bill Fletcher as Lee Maddox, and Joanne Linville as Lydia Montgomery.
| 14 | "The Big Fifty" | John Brahm | Philip Reisman Jr. | December 10, 1966 |
After one of Ryker's hands is shot, Shane is blamed. They find him guilty in a mock jury trial. Ben sneaks away to warn Tom and Marian about what's going on, and the whole family fights to save Shane's life. With Wayne Rogers as Jim Greevy.
| 15 | "The Great Invasion: Part 1" | David Greene | Ernest Kinoy | December 17, 1966 |
Major Hackett, his hired guns and his Gatling gun are coming against any rancher or homesteader who is not a member of a certain cattlemen association. Shane, concerned for the homesteaders and even for Ryker, tries to warn them to join together to fight Hackett. With Archie Moore as Dan, Constance Ford as Longhorn Jenny, and Bradford Dillman as Major Hackett.
| 16 | "The Great Invasion: Part 2" | David Greene | Ernest Kinoy | December 24, 1966 |
Shane is unable to convince the homesteaders and Ryker of the need to fight Major Hackett and his army, even after they attacked a cattlewoman. So, Shane joins his troop, trying to learn which ranchers they plan to attack next so he can warn them before someone else is killed. With Bradford Dillman as Major Hackett.
| 17 | "A Man'd Be Proud" | Alex March | Denne Bart Petitclerc & William Blinn | December 31, 1966 |
Ryker's attempt to woo Marian into becoming his ranch's cook becomes another kind of wooing. Will that prompt Shane to leave, or to finally take action?

== Home media ==
On March 10, 2015, Timeless Media Group released Shane: The Complete Series on DVD in Region 1.
