= Shane (novel) =

1949 novel by Jack Schaefer

- First edition
- Author: Jack Schaefer
- Language: English
- Genre: Western
- Publisher: Houghton Mifflin
- Publication date: 1949
- Publication place: United States
- Media type: Print (hardback & paperback)
- Pages: 214 p. (hardback first edition) & 119 p. (paperback edition)
- ISBN: 978-0-553-27110-2 (paperback edition)
- OCLC: 53183237

Shane is a western novel by Jack Schaefer published in 1949. It was initially published in 1946 in three parts in Argosy magazine, and originally titled Rider from Nowhere. The novel has been printed in seventy or more editions, and translated into over 30 languages, and was adapted into the 1953 film starring Alan Ladd.

The novel covered themes associated with the Johnson County War and took the side of the settlers in their conflict against the wealthy ranchers.

== Plot ==
The story is set in 1889 Wyoming, when the Wyoming Territory was still open to the Homestead Act of 1862. It is narrated by a homesteader's son, Bob Starrett. The original unclaimed land surrounding the Starretts' homestead had been used by a cattle driver named Luke Fletcher before being claimed by Bob's father, Joe Starrett, along with 12 other homesteaders. Fletcher had settled there first, although he could only claim 160 acres (650,000 m^{2}) as a homestead. He wants to expand his herd; homesteads in the area would hinder its growth.

The title character, Shane, is a mysterious stranger who rides into and then out of the lives of the Starrett family, "a man who seemed to come from nowhere and appeared equally determined to pass on to nowhere." He is typically quiet, always silent about his past. He does not wear his gun, and yet everyone seems to understand that he is a dangerous man. Joe Starrett hires Shane as a hand on his farm, and Shane puts aside his handsome Western clothes and buys dungarees. He then helps the homesteaders to avoid intimidation by Fletcher and his men, who try to get them to abandon their farms. With Joe Starrett's leadership and Shane's help, the farmers resist Fletcher. Shane is forced into a gun battle.

== Characters ==
- Shane – the protagonist, a mysterious gunslinger who enters into the life of Joe Starrett and his family and carves a place for himself in their hearts. Although he tries to leave his gunslinging past behind, refusing even to carry a gun, he decides to fight Fletcher in order to save Starrett's farm. "Shane was dangerous, but he was good."
- Bob Starrett – Joe Starrett's son. He is eleven years old. He is the narrator. In the words of author Jack Schaeffer's son Jon, the character of Bob is, "a boy who thinks [mysterious stranger Shane] is a God."
- Joe Starrett – Bob's father. A former cattle driver, now a homesteader and a farmer. He is the unofficial leader of the local homestead farmers.
- Marian Starrett – Joe's wife. She loves her husband but also comes to love Shane.
- Luke Fletcher – the antagonist. He is an open range rancher, set on purchasing or stealing all the land rights from the homesteaders and farmers. When the homesteaders refuse to sell, Fletcher resorts to intimidation and deadly force.
- Chris – one of Fletcher's cowhands, a young man who intimidates the homesteaders and takes on Shane.
- Stark Wilson – gunslinger hired by Fletcher to intimidate the homesteaders and kill those who refuse to sell their land.
- Ernie Wright – fellow homesteader, aligned with the Starretts.
- Mr. Grafton – general store owner who witnesses the fight with Shane involved.
- Will Atkey – the bartender at Grafton's general store.

== Themes ==
One of the most obvious themes of Shane is the tension between the fence-favoring homesteaders and the open-range cattle man Luke Fletcher. In the book, the homesteaders are shown as the small-time operators threatened by a powerful, wealthy man with a large herd of cattle and a government beef contract. On a personal level, the story deals with a man's attempt to leave behind a violent past and the decisions he must take when the homesteaders who have befriended him are faced with danger beyond their experience.

The story, seen through the eyes of a young boy, is also a coming of age story. The boy is puzzled by Shane and his hidden violence, who is beyond his sheltered experience, but comes to trust, love, and venerate him. Times book editor Jack Miles wrote that “What makes ‘Shane’ different, what makes it a classic among Westerns, is that it is a story told by a boy. Schaefer understood...that the Western is an American boy's dream of the world as it should be.”

Shane also demonstrates Schaefer’s strong focus on the social bonds between men, as in the scene when Shane and Joe Starrett uproot an old tree stump. The section ends, “an old stump on its side with root ends making a strange pattern against the glow of the sun sinking behind the far mountains and two men looking over it into each other’s eyes.”

In later years, Schaefer would regret these aspects of his novel, stating Shane was, "aiding the advance of settlement, giving his push to the accelerating onrush of the very civilization I find deserving contempt." This statement was largely influenced by his opinions molded by the aftermath of the Vietnam War. For Schaefer, the book had become a symbol of establishing a nation that would soon ravage the environment, not just in the continent but also abroad.

== Critical reception ==
Richard S. Wheeler has written of Shane and its author: "This was Jack Schaefer’s first novel. He preferred in later years to write stories less mythic and more attuned to the real West.... Although he is little known, and the volume of his work is small, he surely ranks as one of this nation’s greatest." The novel has frequently been honored by the Western Writers of America as one of the best of the modern genre.

Marc Simmons wrote, "By any standard of measurement, Jack Schaefer's Shane rates as a classic in the literature of the American West. William Nauenberg wrote in The Objective Standard that "Shane by Jack Schaefer is an invigorating tale of heroism that celebrates the fundamental power of the good in human life and its ability to defeat evil."

== Publication ==
=== Argosy Version ===
Shane was originally published by Argosy, an American pulp magazine. It was published as Rider from Nowhere, a three-part serial, beginning in July 1946. This version was also somewhat shorter. Most notably, it did not include the famous early scene in which Shane and Joe Starrett bond while working together to remove a large stump. Harry Steeger, the editor of Argosy at that time, commented later that when the manuscript arrived, "[it] was so badly typed, single spaced all the way through, dog-eared looking and altogether amateurish in appearance, it should have been returned at once. But an editor started to read it, stuck with it and couldn't put it down until the last word."

=== Houghton Mifflin ===
In 1949, Houghton Mifflin issued a revised and expanded version of the Argosy stories.

== Film and TV adaptations ==
- 1953 film Shane, starring Alan Ladd, Jean Arthur, Van Heflin, Brandon de Wilde, and Jack Palance, and directed by George Stevens.
- 1966 television series Shane, starring David Carradine and directed by Herschel Daugherty and Gary Nelson.
- The 1985 Clint Eastwood film Pale Rider borrows heavily from the plot of Shane.
- The 1987 post-apocalyptic movie Steel Dawn closely follows the plot of Shane, according to Walter Goodman of The New York Times.
- The 2017 Marvel superhero film Logan drew substantial thematic influence from Shane, and formally acknowledged it with a series of specific dialog references and clips from the 1953 film. As the film ends, Shane's farewell words to Joey are recited, verbatim, at the title character's grave.

== Influence ==
- The film inspired Marty Wilde to write a song about it. Entitled Shane, it was the B-side of Kim Wilde's second single Chequered Love in 1982.
- A novel has inspired a rock song "Šejn" (Shane in Serbo-Croatian) from 1985 by Yugoslav rock band Haustor. It was one of the most recognized songs of the band.
- The novel was adapted as a stage play by Karen Zacarias and co-produced in 2023 by the Guthrie Theater in Minneapolis and the Cincinnati Playhouse.
- A second stage play adaptation, by Mark Pracht, was presented at City Lit Theatre in Chicago in the Fall of 2026.

== Sources ==
- Mullen, Patricia A. (May 1955). "New York Market Letter". Writer's Digest. pp. 38–48.
