= Oil Hill, Kansas =

Ghost town in Kansas, U.S.

Coordinates: 37°50′10″N 96°53′08″W

Oil Hill, Kansas is a ghost town in Butler County, Kansas, United States.

== History ==
The community was formed during the oil boom in Butler County. A post office was established in Oil Hill in 1917, and remained in operation until it was discontinued in 1958. The community no longer exists and is considered a ghost town.

== Education ==
The modern day area around Oil Hill is served by the Circle USD 375 public school district. Oil Hill Elementary School is named to commemorate the history of the former community.

== Transportation ==
The Missouri Pacific Railroad formerly provided passenger rail service along a route from Eldorado to McPherson although this had ended prior to 1946. As of 2025, the nearest passenger rail station is located in Newton, where Amtrak's Southwest Chief stops once daily on a route from Chicago to Los Angeles.

== Notable people ==
- Larry Hartshorn (1933–2007), professional football player for the Chicago Cardinals.

== See also ==
- List of ghost towns in Kansas
