= Monte Walsh (1970 film) =

1970 film by William A. Fraker

- VHS cover
- Directed by: William A. Fraker
- Screenplay by: David Zelag Goodman; Lukas Heller
- Based on: Monte Walsh by Jack Schaefer
- Produced by: Hal Landers; Bobby Roberts
- Starring: Lee Marvin; Jeanne Moreau; Jack Palance
- Cinematography: David M. Walsh
- Edited by: Richard K. Brockway; Ray Daniels; Gene Fowler, Jr.; Robert L. Wolfe
- Music by: John Barry
- Production companies: Cinema Center Films; Landers-Roberts Productions
- Distributed by: National General Pictures
- Release date: October 7, 1970
- Running time: 99 minutes
- Country: United States
- Language: English
- Budget: $5 million

Monte Walsh is a 1970 American Western film directed by cinematographer William A. Fraker (his directorial debut) starring Lee Marvin, Jeanne Moreau and Jack Palance. The name "Monte Walsh" is taken from the title of a 1963 western novel by Jack Schaefer, but the film has little to do with the plot of Schaefer's book. The film was set in Harmony, Arizona. The story has elements of a tragedy. The song played over the opening credits is "The Good Times Are Comin' " by Mama Cass, with music and lyrics by John Barry and Hal David.

== Plot ==
Monte Walsh is an older cowboy facing the final days of the Old West. He and his friend Chet Rollins, another longtime cowhand, work on cattle ranches, preferring to do "nothing that can't be done from a horse". Their lives are divided between months on the range and the occasional trip into town. Camaraderie and competition with the other cowboys fill their days. When they find out that the Cross Bar ranch that they had worked "was wiped out during the last winter", they take work at the Slash Y ranch where their old boss Cal Brennan is the "range manager". At the Slash Y, they meet an old friend, Shorty Austin, another cowhand and bronco buster.

Monte has a long-term relationship with an old flame, prostitute and saloon girl Martine Bernard, who suffers from tuberculosis. Chet has fallen in love with Mary Eagle, a widow who owns a hardware store. As barbed wire and railroads steadily eliminate the need for the cowboy. Monte and his friends are left with fewer and fewer options. The Slash Y isn't doing too well and Shorty is let go. As there is no other work available, he gets involved in rustling and killing, gunning down a local lawman. At this point, Monte and Chet find that their lives on the range are inexorably redirected.

Chet marries Mary and will go to work in the hardware store. He tells Monte that their old way of life is simply disappearing and that, "Nobody gets to be a cowboy forever". Caught up in the spirit of the moment, Monte rides 40 mi (64 km) to visit Martine and asks her to marry him, and she accepts. Monte goes on a drinking binge and rides an unbroken bucking horse that came from the Slash Y ranch through town, causing considerable damage, smashing through a plate glass window of a "china shop" and shattering the entire store's stock. A wild west roundup show owner, Colonel Wilson, sees him ride the bronco to a halt and offers him a job to perform as "Texas Jack Butler star cowboy, bronco buster and all-around wild man of the west". Monte considers the offer which includes a significant weekly salary and all expenses paid, but decides the work is too degrading and refuses. He tells Colonel Wilson, "I ain't spitting on my whole life".

Time goes on, Shorty being desperate, robs Chet's hardware store, shoots and kills Chet. Before Chet's funeral, Cal tells Monte that The Slash Y Ranch has closed, leaving Monte out of work. Instead of going to the funeral Monte heads after Shorty "to do the law's work". While searching for Shorty, Monte finds out that Martine is "in a bad way". He goes to see her but he arrives too late, she has died. Monte is mourning at Martine's death bed when Shorty calls him out for a showdown.

Monte pursues Shorty through a slaughterhouse. Shorty shoots Monte in the arm. Monte manages to slip around and confront Shorty. Shorty holsters his pistol and Monte shoots him anyway. As Shorty dies, Monte says to him, or maybe to himself as Shorty might already be dead, "I rode down the grey... you had to sit him high". Monte is on his own. The theme of the last scene is a repeat of the opening scene where Monte sees a wolf and prepares to shoot it. While aiming, he is talking to his horse (in the opening scene he was talking to Chet) and segues into the same story he told in scene one about a man, Big Joe Abernathy, who used to wrestle wolves. He doesn't shoot the wolf. He rides off into the "New West".

== Cast ==
- Lee Marvin as Monte Walsh
- Jeanne Moreau as Martine Bernard
- Jack Palance as Chet Rollins
- Mitchell Ryan as "Shorty" Austin
- Michael Conrad as Dally Johnson
- Jim Davis as Cal Brennan
- Allyn Ann McLerie as Mary Eagle
- G.D. Spradlin as Hal Henderson
- Eric Christmas as Colonel Wilson
- John Carter as Farmer
- John Hudkins as Sonny Jacobs (credited as John "Bear" Hudkins)
- Raymond Guth as "Sunfish" Perkins (credited as Ray Guth)
- John McKee as Petey Williams
- Tom Heaton as "Sugar" Wyman
- Ted Gehring as "Skimpy" Eagans
- Bo Hopkins as Joe "Jumpin' Joe" Joslin
- John McLiam as Joe "Fightin' Joe" Hooker
- Matt Clark as Rufus Brady
- Billy Green Bush as "Powder" Kent
- Charles Tyner as Doctor
- Richard Farnsworth as Cowboy
- Jack Colvin as Card Cheat
- Roy Barcroft as Proprietor (final role)

== Production ==
Finance came from Cinema Center Films.

== Music ==
Mama Cass performed the title song "The Good Times Are Comin'" during the opening sequence, it was written by John Barry with lyrics by Hal David.

== Reception ==
Most reviews of the film were positive, and the western has scored an 88% rating on Rotten Tomatoes. A positive notice came from critic Roger Ebert, who remarked that the production was "as lovely a Western as I've seen in a long time."

In Cinema Retro, John M. Whalen wrote:

It's a true classic and even though it features two of the toughest tough guy actors of the sixties and seventies, it's not a melodramatic shoot-em-up, full of violence, sound and fury. Rather it's an elegiac portrait of the way it must have really happened, presented in a style as realistic as the Frederic Remington paintings shown under the opening credits.

== Remake ==
A made-for-TV remake was released in 2003. Also called Monte Walsh, it was set in Wyoming and directed by Simon Wincer, with Monte and Martine played by Tom Selleck and Isabella Rossellini.

== See also ==
- List of American films of 1970
