= Monte Walsh (2003 film) =

2003 TV film

- DVD cover
- Genre: Western
- Based on: Monte Walsh by Jack Schaefer
- Teleplay by: Michael Brandman; Robert B. Parker; David Z. Goodman; Lukas Heller
- Directed by: Simon Wincer
- Starring: Tom Selleck
- Music by: Eric Colvin
- Country of origin: United States
- Original language: English

Production
- Executive producers: Michael Brandman; Tom Selleck
- Producer: Steven Brandman
- Cinematography: David Eggby
- Editor: Alan Baumgarten
- Running time: 117 minutes
- Production companies: TNT Originals Inc.; Michael Brandman Productions; TWS Productions II Inc.

Original release
- Network: TNT
- Release: January 17, 2003

Monte Walsh is a 2003 American Western television film directed by Simon Wincer and starring Tom Selleck, Isabella Rossellini, and Keith Carradine. It based on Jack Schaefer's 1963 novel and is a remake of the 1970 film starring Lee Marvin.

Monte Walsh is the quintessential cowboy—the last of a dying breed. His story takes place in the waning years of the "Old West" near the end of the 19th century. Two long-time cowboys, Monte and his best friend Chet, have their lives on the range inexorably changed by the coming modernity and a fellow cowboy who becomes involved with rustling, robbery, and killing.

This is the third collaboration between Wincer and Selleck, following Quigley Down Under in 1990 and Crossfire Trail in 2001.

The film premiered on TNT on January 17, 2003.

== Overview ==
Set in Wyoming and filmed in Alberta, Canada, Monte Walsh is a remake of the 1970 theatrical film Monte Walsh starring Lee Marvin. The script is nearly word-for-word identical to the original (original screenwriters David Zelag Goodman and Lukas Heller are credited) and a lot of set-ups and shots are the same, as well, but Selleck plays a much more amiable and kind Walsh, to the point that some of the harsher lines attributed to Marvin's Walsh are given to other characters to soften the title character's personality to match Selleck's more affable style.

== Plot ==
In 1892 in Antelope Junction, Wyoming, Montelius "Monte" Walsh is an aging cowboy facing the final days of the Wild West era. His friend Chet Rollins, another long-time cowhand, and he work at whatever ranch work comes their way, but "nothing they can't do from a horse". Their lives are divided between months on the range and the occasional trip into town. Camaraderie and competition with the other cowboys fill their days. They seek work and take a job at the ranch of Cal Brennan, where they meet an old friend, Shorty Austin, another ranch hand.

Monte has a long-term relationship with an old flame, prostitute and saloon girl "Countess" Martine Bernard, who suffers from tuberculosis. Chet, meanwhile, has fallen in love with Mary Wilder, a widow who owns a hardware store. As barbed wire and railways steadily eliminate the need for the cowboy, Monte and his friends are left with fewer and fewer options. New work opportunities are available to them, but the freedom of the open prairie is for what they long. Shorty loses his job and gets involved in rustling and killing, gunning down a local lawman. Then, Monte and Chet find that their lives on the range are inexorably redirected.

Chet marries Mary and goes to work in the store, telling Monte that their old way of life is simply disappearing. Caught up in the spirit of the moment, Monte asks Martine to marry him, and she accepts. Monte goes on a drinking binge and rides a wild bay horse that even Shorty could not tame through town, causing considerable damage.

A rodeo owner, Colonel Wilson, sees him and offers him a job. Monte considers the high salary, but decides the work is too degrading and refuses. Eventually, they all must say goodbye to the lives they knew, and try to make a new start. When Shorty shoots and kills Chet while trying to rob the store, Monte, distraught after the death of his beloved Martine, goes after him.

Shorty arrives, knowing the fight to come with his former friend is apparent. He tells Monte he is sorry to hear of Martine's death and walks off, perhaps trying to give Monte a choice to kill him or walk away. Monte, unable to shoot Shorty in the back as he walks away, pursues. Shorty makes a long shot with a pistol at Monte, but runs off when the shot only wounds Monte in the left side. Monte then manages to slip around Shorty and shoots him. As Shorty is dying, Monte tells him that he broke in the wild bay horse.

Seven years pass and Monte returns from working all over the West. His friends have gotten older, prices are rising, and he is seen by the townspeople as a relic of another time, but one little boy asks for lessons in roping. When the accountant who manages the lands he used to ranch drives his primitive car into a mud puddle and asks for help, Monte jumps his horse over the vehicle and rides away.

== Cast ==
- Tom Selleck as Monte Walsh
- Isabella Rossellini as Martine
- Keith Carradine as Chet Rollins
- George Eads as "Shorty" Austin
- Robert Carradine as "Sunfish" Perkins
- Barry Corbin as Bob Alderson
- James Gammon as Joe "Fightin' Joe" Hooker
- Rex Linn as "Hat" Henderson
- John Michael Higgins as Robert Slocumb
- William Sanderson as "Skimpy" Eagens
- Wallace Shawn as Colonel Wilson
- Marshall Teague as Dally Johnson
- Rick Ravanello as "Sugar" Wyman
- Joanna Miles as Sairy Brennan
- Lori Hallier as Mary Wilder
- Matt Cooke as Rufus Brady
- Ken Pogue as Old Doctor
- Zack Ward as "Powder" Kent
- William Devane as Cal Brennan
- Shane Pollitt as Joe Joslin
- Tom Edwards as Plump Lawyer
- Tom Glass as The Marshal
- Tim Koetting as Stocky Barman
- Bruce McFee as Burly Man
- Marty Antonini as Farmer
- Eric Keenleyside as Engineer

== Production ==
=== Filming locations ===
- CL Western Studio and Backlot, Cochrane, Alberta, Canada
- CL Ranch, 45001 Township Road, Calgary, Alberta, Canada
- Longview, Alberta, Canada
- Redwater, Alberta, Canada

== Reception ==
=== Awards and nominations ===
- 2003 Emmy Award Nomination for Outstanding Sound Editing for a Miniseries, Movie or a Special
- 2004 Western Heritage Awards Bronze Wrangler for Outstanding Television Feature Film
