= William Hoffman (painter) =

American painter (1924–1995)

- Born: 1924; Montana, U.S.
- Died: 1995; Big Bear Lake, California, U.S.
- Known for: Seascapes, Western landscapes, Native American portraits
- Notable work: Moonlit Seascape
- Movement: Western American Art

William Hoffman (1924–1995) was a self-taught American painter known for his seascapes and Western-themed oil paintings. Born and raised in Montana, he worked on cattle ranches before serving in the United States Marine Corps during World War II.

== Early life and career ==
After the war, Hoffman pursued several careers and briefly attended three colleges. While working as a regional manager for the American Society of Composers, Authors and Publishers (ASCAP) in 1964, he visited a San Francisco art gallery, which inspired him to begin painting.

== Artistic development ==
Hoffman's early works featured the Pacific Ocean. A Los Angeles art dealer offered to buy his entire output sight unseen. Over the following decade, he completed 22 paintings that were widely reproduced. Later in his career, he turned toward Western scenes, focusing on Native American subjects and frontier landscapes.

== Legacy ==
Hoffman's paintings have appeared in national art auctions, with prices ranging from $50 to $3,300. His Moonlit Seascape sold for $3,300 at Altermann Galleries in 2000.

== Books ==
Hoffman illustrated or provided cover art for the following books:

- The First Easter (1959) by Peter Marshall
- Five World Biographies (1961), ed. Leon Edel, et al.
- Four English Biographies (1961) by J. B. Priestley and O. B. Davis
- The Blue of Capricorn (1962) by Eugene Burdick
- Indian Uprising (1962) by George Cory Franklin
- The Last Portage (1962) by Walter O'Meara
- Hero of Trafalgar (1963) by A. B. C. Whipple
- Backtrack (1965) by Milton Lott
- Time Was (1965) by John Foster West
- Phaëthon (1966) by Merrill Pollack
- Heroes, Gods and Monsters of the Greek Myths (1966) by Bernard Evslin
- Poems to Remember (1967) by Dorothy Petitt

== Dust jackets ==
He also illustrated covers for:

- Kings Will Be Tyrants (1959) by Ward Hawkins
- The Levantines (1963) by Fausta Cialente
- The Mountbattens (1965) by Alden R. Hatch
- Avalon (1966) by Anya Seton
- World in a Glass (1966) by John Dos Passos
- A Tract of Time (1966) by Smith Hempstone
- Jubilee (1966) by Margaret Walker
- Earth Abides (1969) by George R. Stewart
- Operation Destruct (1969) by Christopher Nicole
- Logan's Run (1969) by William F. Nolan and George Clayton Johnson
- Where the Cavern Ends (1970) by Christopher Nicole
