= Jubilee (disambiguation) =

A jubilee is a particular anniversary of an event, usually denoting the 25th (silver), 40th (ruby), 50th (golden), 60th (diamond), or 70th (platinum) anniversary.

Jubilee may also refer to:

== Events ==
=== Anniversaries and celebrations ===
- Jubilee (biblical) (Hebrew yovel יובל), end of seven cycles of shmita (Sabbatical years) in the Mosaic Law
- Jubilee of the Reunification of Jerusalem, an Israeli celebration in 2017
- Jubilee in the Catholic Church, occurring every 25 years, in celebration of the mercy of God
  - Great Jubilee, the Catholic jubilee that occurred in the year 2000
- List of jubilees of British monarchs

=== Other events ===
- Jubilee riots, in Toronto, Canada in 1875
- Mobile Bay jubilee, a regularly occurring natural underwater phenomenon
- Operation Jubilee, the Dieppe Raid by the Allied Forces on Dieppe in WW-2 (1942)

== Arts and entertainment ==
=== Film, television and radio ===
- Jubilee (1978 film), a cult film directed by Derek Jarman
- Jubilee (2000 film), a comedy drama film directed by Michael Hurst
- Jubilee (radio program), an Armed Forces Radio Service program 1942–1953
- Jubilee Bunt-a-thon, a 2012 animated short film
- Jubilee1, a former Scottish local radio station
- Jubilee Media, an American YouTube channel and media company.
- Jubilee (TV series), a 2023 Indian Hindi-language period drama

=== Literature ===
- Book of Jubilees, an ancient Jewish religious text
- Jubilee (collection), a collection of short stories by Jack Dann
- Jubilee (character), a Marvel Comics character
- Jubilee (Walker novel), by Margaret Walker
- Jubilee (Solomon novel), 1994, by Nepi Solomon
- Jubilee: Recipes from Two Centuries of African American Cooking

=== Music ===
- Jubilee (opera), a 1976 opera by Ulysses Kay
- Jubilee Records, an American independent record label
- Jubilee quartet, a style of 20th-Century African-American religious vocal group

==== Musical groups ====
- Fisk Jubilee Singers, African-American a cappella ensemble of students at Fisk University
- Jubilee (band), American rock band
- The Jubilees, English rock band

==== Albums ====
- Jubilee (Japanese Breakfast album), 2021
- Jubilee (Maverick City Music album), 2021
- Jubilee (The Deep Dark Woods album), 2013
- Jubilee (Grant Lee Buffalo album) or the title song, 1998
- Jubilee (Sex Pistols album), 2002
- Jubilee (Ten Shekel Shirt album) or the title song, 2008
- Jubilee (Versailles album), 2010
- Jubilee, by Glenn Yarbrough, 1970
- Jubilee: Live at Wolf Trap, a 1996 live video album by Mary Chapin Carpenter

==== EPs ====
- Jubilee (EP), 2021 EP by Maverick City Music

==== Songs ====
- "Jubilee" (Maverick City Music song), 2021
- "Jubilee", by 10,000 Maniacs from Blind Man's Zoo, 1989
- "Jubilee", by Alison Krauss, 2004
- "Jubilee", by Blur from Parklife, 1994
- "Jubilee", by Mary Chapin Carpenter from Stones in the Road, 1992
- "Jubilee", by Patti Smith from Trampin', 2004
- "Jubilee", by Spyro Gyra from Morning Dance, 1979
- "Jubilee", written by Willard Robison
- "Jubilee Song", a song written by Fr. Carlo Magno Marcelo in 1996 for the Great Jubilee of 2000
- "Junk" (song), working title "Jubilee", by Paul McCartney, 1968

=== Theatre ===
- Jubilee (audio drama), based on the British television series Doctor Who
- Jubilee (musical), a 1935 stage musical by Cole Porter and Moss Hart
- Jubilee, a 2001 play by Peter Barnes
- Jubilee!, a long-running Las Vegas burlesque show that opened in 1981
- The Jubilee (play), a 1769 play by David Garrick

=== Other uses in arts and entertainment ===
- Jubilee (solitaire), two solitaire card games

== Buildings and structures ==
- Jubilee Auditorium (disambiguation), either of two facilities in Alberta, Canada
- Jubilee High School, in Addlestone, Surrey, England
- Jubilee Pool, in Penzance, Cornwall, England
- Jubilee Recreation Centre, in Fort Saskatchewan, Alberta, Canada
- Jubilee School, in Amman, Jordan
- The Jubilee, York, a former public house in North Yorkshire, England

== People ==
- James Fisk (financier) (1835–1872), American stockbroker and corporate executive known as "Jubilee Jim"
- DJ Jubilee, New Orleans Bounce rapper
- Jubilee (DJ), American electronic musician
- Jubilee Dunbar (born 1949), American gridiron football player
- Jubilee Jenna Mandl, Austrian figure skater
- Jubilee McGill, American politician from Vermont
- Yovel Zoosman (born 1988), Israeli basketball player

== Places ==
- Jubilee Cave, the longest show cave at Jenolan Caves in the Blue Mountains, New South Wales, Australia
- Jubilee Lake, in Oregon, United States
- Jubilee Mountain, in Canada
- Jubilee Oil Field, in the South Atlantic Ocean
- Jubilee Peak, in the South Shetland Islands near the Antarctic Peninsula
- Jubilee River, in southern England
- Jubilee Rock, in Blisland, Cornwall, England
- Jubilee Walkway, in London, England

== Transportation ==
- MS Jubilee, a former cruise ship also known as Pacific Sun and Henna
- Jubilee, collective name of the Boeing 777 fleet owned by Singapore Airlines
- Jubilee Class (disambiguation), locomotives and ocean liners
- Jubilee Exhibition Railway, formerly in Adelaide, South Australia

=== Stations and lines ===
- Health Sciences/Jubilee station, in Edmonton, Alberta, Canada
- Jubilee Bus Station, Secunderabad, India
- Jubilee line, a London Underground line opened in 1979 by the then-Prince of Wales during Elizabeth II's Silver Jubilee
  - Subsequently extended to Stratford in 1999 (See: Jubilee Line Extension)
- SAIT/AUArts/Jubilee station, in Calgary, Alberta, Canada

== Organizations ==
- Jubilee 2000, a former international organization dedicated to debt cancellation and poverty reduction
- Jubilee Alliance, a former political alliance in Kenya
- Jubilee Debt Coalition, successor to the Jubilee 2000 coalition
- Jubilee Party, a Kenyan political party established in 2016
- Jubilee Media, a Los Angeles–based media company

== Other uses ==
- Debt jubilee, a clearance of debt from public records across a wide sector or a nation
- Jubilee Clip, a genericised brand name for a worm-drive hose clamp
- Jubilee FC, a football (soccer) team in Liberia
- Jubilee tomato, a tomato cultivar

== See also ==
- "Jewbilee", an episode of the TV series South Park
