= The Last Hunt =

1956 film

- Theatrical Film Poster
- Directed by: Richard Brooks
- Screenplay by: Richard Brooks
- Based on: The Last Hunt; 1954 novel by Milton Lott
- Produced by: Dore Schary
- Starring: Robert Taylor; Stewart Granger; Lloyd Nolan; Debra Paget; Russ Tamblyn
- Cinematography: Russell Harlan
- Edited by: Ben Lewis
- Music by: Daniele Amfitheatrof
- Color process: Eastmancolor
- Production company: Metro-Goldwyn-Mayer
- Distributed by: Metro-Goldwyn-Mayer
- Release dates: April 30, 1956 (United States); 25 February 1956 (Bahamas)
- Running time: 108 minutes 104 minutes (TCM print)
- Country: United States
- Language: English
- Budget: $2,121,000
- Box office: $2,983,000

The Last Hunt is a 1956 American Western film directed by Richard Brooks and starring Robert Taylor and Stewart Granger, with Lloyd Nolan, Debra Paget and Russ Tamblyn. It was produced by Dore Schary at Metro-Goldwyn-Mayer. The screenplay was by Richard Brooks from the novel The Last Hunt, by Milton Lott. The music score was by Daniele Amfitheatrof and the cinematography by Russell Harlan.

== Plot ==
It is 1883. Hunting of buffalo has reduced the population from 60 million in 1853 to 3,000. This is the story of “the last of the buffalo hunts.” Sandy McKenzie, a famous buffalo hunter for the Army Engineers, has his small herd of cattle wiped out by stampeding bison. He joins up with a new partner, the obsessive Charles Gilson, who believes killing is natural. While McKenzie has grown tired of buffalo hunting, Gilson derives an intense pleasure from his "stands" – killing an entire herd of buffalo at one time. They add an old friend of McKenzie, a legendary skinner named Woodfoot because of his peg leg, and young Jimmy O'Brien, whose mother was Dakota, to their team.

When Gilson chases down and kills an Indian raiding party, he takes an Indian woman and a toddler captive. The presence of the native woman causes tension and Gilson becomes increasingly paranoid and deranged, leading to a stand-off between the two former partners. He is obsessed with the idea that McKenzie stole a valuable white buffalo hide. In fact, Jimmy took it and placed in a tree along with the body of his friend Spotted Hand, one of Gilson's many victims, according to the religious practices of their people.

Over a landscape strewn with bones, Gilson tracks McKenzie, the woman and Jimmy to a cave high in a bluff. It is bitterly cold and snowing. McKenzie persuades Gilson to allow Jimmy to go on with the cattle, which they are taking to the Indian agency where her people are starving. It grows dark, and Gilson tells McKenzie he does not trust him. He should come down in the morning. A lone buffalo appears; Gilson kills and hastily skins it, saying “You'll keep me warm.”

In the bright morning, McKenzie and the woman emerge from shelter to find that Gilson has frozen to death during the night, pointing his gun at the cave. waiting to ambush them. The moisture in the raw buffalo skin has turned it into an icy coffin, and the snow collected on the fur makes it look like the pelt of a white buffalo. McKenzie and the woman ride away, and the camera pans up to a nearby tree, the white buffalo skin stretched in its branches.

== Cast ==
- Robert Taylor as Charles Gilson
- Stewart Granger as Sandy McKenzie
- Lloyd Nolan as Woodfoot
- Debra Paget as Indian Girl
- Russ Tamblyn as Jimmy O'Brien
- Constance Ford as Peg
- Joe DeSantis as Ed Black
- Ainslie Pryor as First Buffalo Hunter
- Ralph Moddy as Indian Agent
- Fred Graham as Bartender
- Ed Lonehill as Spotted Hand
- Roy Barcroft as Major Smith (uncredited)

== Original novel ==
The New York Times said "except for A.B. Guthrie's The Big Sky and The Way West I can think of no novel about the Old West published within the last fifteen years as good as The Last Hunt, by Milton Lott. This is the real thing, a gritty, tough, exciting story reeking with the pungent smells of dead buffalo and of dirty men." W. R. Burnett called it an "undeniably able and interesting book."

== Development ==
MGM bought the film rights and announced it as a vehicle for Stewart Granger in February 1955. "It's real Americana", said the star. Richard Brooks was assigned the job of adapting and directing. The film was the first of only three westerns directed by Brooks, and was his first film following the critically acclaimed Blackboard Jungle (1955).

In March, Robert Taylor was announced as a co-star. Russ Tamblyn was then given the lead support part as Jimmy O'Brien, a half Indian. Lloyd Nolan was also cast – his first film role in over a year and a half, during which time he had played The Caine Mutiny Court Martial on stage. Anne Bancroft was originally cast as the Indian girl.

== Production ==
Eighty percent of the movie was shot on location over a seven-week period. This took place at the Badlands National Park and Custer State Park in South Dakota during the then-annual "thinning" of the buffalo herd.

Actual footage of buffalo being shot and killed (by government marksmen) was used for the film. Harvey Lancaster of Custer was the main marksman for the filming.

The story takes place during the winter but was actually filmed during the scorching summer months in Custer State Park. When temperatures reached triple digits, Stewart Granger, whose costume consisted of full winter clothing, passed out from heat exhaustion and the crew had to cut away his clothes to revive him.

Granger and director Brooks were reportedly not fond of one another, especially after Brooks married Granger's ex-wife, Jean Simmons. After three weeks of filming, Anne Bancroft was injured during filming after falling from a horse. She was replaced by Debra Paget. During filming, Dore Schary announced Taylor and Granger would be reteamed in another western, The Return of Johnny Burro with Granger playing a villain and Taylor a hero. However the film was not made.

== Reception ==
The film earned $1,750,000 in North American rental during its first year of release. It recorded admissions of 1,201,326 in France.

According to MGM records, the film earned $1,604,000 in the US and Canada and $1,379,000 overseas, resulting in a loss of $323,000.

In his March 1, 1956, review for The New York Times, Bosley Crowther wrote: “Buffaloes never looked lovelier than they do…in The Last Hunt, ...Great shaggy beasts with tiny soft eyes and heads like mahogany lions roam in huge herds across the landscape... Indeed, they appear so noble in their natural habitat on the western plains that it shocks one to sit in the theatre and see them deliberately slain. And that is what you see in this picture.... the killing that is witnessed by the audience is contemporary and real. It is the annual "thinning" of the protected herd at Custer State Park in South Dakota, ... It is official and necessary killing, ...Even so...the cold-blooded shooting down of them as they stand in all their majesty and grandeur around a water hole...is startling and slightly nauseating. ... Of course, that is as it was intended, for The Last Hunt is aimed to display the low and demoralizing influence of a lust for slaughter upon the nature of man. ...But, unfortunately, what follows ... is mainly an account of bitter conflict between two hard-bitten buffalo-hunting men. One..is a bestial and brutal type who hates Indians and likes to kill them almost as much as he likes to kill buffaloes. The other...is a decent, deliberate sort of chap who has a high regard for the Indians and eventually for buffaloes. He develops, especially, a soft spot for a beautiful Indian girl...And while his companion..is alternately beating on the girl and making vain efforts to assault her, Mr. Granger is, ...working up his nerve to slug his pal. ....The picture has been made with clear devotion .... The equating of Indian-hating with a lust for slaughter is morally good. But it does seem to take Mr. Granger an awfully long time to get around to freezing out Mr. Taylor. That's the way sermons sometimes go.”

"The public couldn't stand it", said Brooks. "In England most of the scenes with the buffalo were cut out. In the States they couldn't stand it because of their own guilt... I learnt something very valuable: when you deal with a subject that is traditional, don't deny it to the public... If you want to do the real thing, the way the West really was, do it on a small budget and don't expect any miracles."

Filmink called it "one of those supposedly liberal ‘50s Westerns that are actually really racist."

== Comic book adaptation ==
- Dell Four Color #678 (February 1956)

== See also ==
- List of American films of 1956
