= Jubel =

Jubel or Jubël may refer to:

== Literature ==
- Jubel, a 1995 Norwegian novel by Lars Saabye Christensen

== Music ==
- "Jubel", several compositions by Carl Maria von Weber
- "Jubel" (song), by Klingande, 2013
- Jubël (duo), a Swedish band

== Other uses ==
- Front for Socialism and Democracy/Benno Jubël, a political party in Senegal
- Jubel beer, brewing company based in the United Kingdom

== See also ==
- Jubilee (disambiguation)
