= The Way West (film) =

1967 film by Andrew V. McLaglen

- Original 1967 cinema poster
- Directed by: Andrew V. McLaglen
- Screenplay by: Ben Maddow; Mitch Lindemann
- Based on: The Way West; 1949 novel by A. B. Guthrie Jr. (1901–1991)
- Produced by: Harold Hecht
- Starring: Kirk Douglas; Robert Mitchum; Richard Widmark; Lola Albright; Jack Elam; Sally Field; Stubby Kaye; Katherine Justice; Eve McVeagh
- Cinematography: William H. Clothier
- Edited by: Otho Lovering
- Music by: Bronislau Kaper
- Production company: Harold Hecht Company
- Distributed by: United Artists
- Release date: May 24, 1967 (US)
- Running time: 122 minutes
- Country: United States
- Language: English

The Way West is a 1967 American Western film directed by Andrew V. McLaglen and starring Kirk Douglas, Robert Mitchum, and Richard Widmark. The supporting cast features Lola Albright, Jack Elam, Sally Field, Katherine Justice, and Stubby Kaye. Ostensibly based on the 1949 Pulitzer Prize-winning novel of the same name by A. B. Guthrie Jr. (1901–1991), the film is a drama about a band of settlers traveling by covered wagon train across the American frontier of the West to the Oregon Country on the Oregon Trail in 1843. It includes on-location cinematography by William H. Clothier. Sam Elliott made his feature film debut as an uncredited Missouri townsman.

== Plot ==
Former U.S. Senator William Tadlock (Kirk Douglas) is leaving his home in Missouri in 1843, heading west on the Oregon Trail by wagon train to the Oregon Country (Pacific Northwest region). His son and slave come along, with mountain man Dick Summers (Robert Mitchum) that he recruited as a hired guide and scout. Joining them on the expedition are cantankerous farmer Lije Evans (Richard Widmark), his wife Rebecca (Lola Albright), and 16-year-old son Brownie (Michael McGreevey). Among others there are also the newlyweds Johnnie (Michael Witney) and Amanda Mack (Katherine Justice), plus the Fairman and McBee families.

Shy young wife Amanda Mack isn't satisfying his needs, so Johnnie Mack gets drunk one evening and strays with young flirtatious Mercy McBee (Sally Field). He also shoots at what he drunkenly thinks is a wolf, and ends up killing a young boy in the woods who happens to be a nearby Lakota Sioux chief's son. When the chief arrives later with the body of his boy dressed up and sitting stiff on a horse and demands satisfaction, Senator Tadlock knows that no other form of justice will do for the Indians if the wagon train is being pursued by them out of vengeance, so he hangs Johnnie, for the safety of the traveling party, but to the settlers outrage. The Indian chieftain speaks to the body of his child that justice has been done, then calls up to the surrounding hilltops, where hundreds of warriors now suddenly appear over the edge of the horizon. So now the settlers can see that they would have had no chance being so out-numbered and that a massacre has been prevented. Further along the trail, it turns out young Mercy is now pregnant as well with the now dead Johnnie Mack's child, and admirer/suitor Brownie Evans proposes marriage to her.

Tadlock's own young son is later killed in a stampede when a wagon crashes and overturns, causing the senator to be so distraught with grief that he becomes more harsh and despotic towards his wagon train charges. The last straw comes when Senator Tadlock destroys Rebecca Evans' antique clock after Lije Evans refuses to abandon it and lighten their wagon to get over some rough terrain. A fight ensues when Tadlock is then attacked by Evans, for which Tadlock retaliates by trying to shoot Evans, only for scout Dick Summers to stop him. The others form a lynch mob and attempt to hang increasingly dictatorial wagon master Tadlock, but then even Lije Evans talks them out of it and now takes charge of the caravan and trek.

Nearly to the end, the trek reaches a steep ravine, which offers the only shortcut to their westward destination. Rebecca Evans shows the others Senator Tadlock's grand plan for a future planned city he wanted to eventually build in Oregon, that he had earlier confided to her, and so Evans relinquishes command back to Tadlock. The settlers lower their possessions, livestock, and each other down the steep escarpment cliffs gradually by ropes to reach the lower continued wagon road west to their destination of the Willamette Valley of Oregon.

Emotionally destroyed by the loss of her man Johnnie, Amanda Mack cuts the rope that Tadlock is descending on, causing the senator to plunge to his death along the cliffs. Amanda runs off into the desert, but the others, after commemorating and remembering Tadlock's efforts and sacrifice, press on to Oregon. Mountain man Dick Summers stays behind, departing to parts unknown.

== Cast ==
- Kirk Douglas as U.S. Senator William J. Tadlock
- Robert Mitchum as Dick Summers
- Richard Widmark as Captain Lije Evans
- Lola Albright as Rebecca Evans
- Jack Elam as Preacher Weatherby
- Michael Witney as Johnnie Mack
- Sally Field as Mercy McBee
- Stubby Kaye as Sam Fairman
- Katherine Justice as Amanda Mack
- Michael McGreevey as Brownie Evans
- Connie Sawyer as Mrs. McBee
- Harry Carey, Jr. as Mr. McBee
- Paul Lukather as Mr. Turley
- Eve McVeagh as Mrs. Masters
- William Lundigan as Michael Moynihan
- Roy Glenn as Saunders
- Patric Knowles as Colonel Grant, commanding at a fort/trading post along the Oregon Trail (based on real-life British Army Captain Walter Colquhoun Grant (1822-1861), serving in the larger tract of the Oregon Country, (northern portion eventually becomes province of British Columbia in future Dominion of Canada), then temporarily jointly occupied by the British (United Kingdom / British Empire) and the (United States)
- Paul Wexler as Barber (uncredited)
- Sam Elliott as a Missouri townsman (uncredited)

== Production ==
Andrew McLaglen recalled that though United Artists was pleased with the film, they wanted 22 minutes at the beginning of the film cut out to reduce the running time.

The film is notable for being the first big-budget western since 1930's widescreen John Wayne spectacle The Big Trail to show pioneers lowering a wagon train over a cliff with ropes.

This was the third time that Mitchum and Douglas appeared in a film together, following Out of the Past (1947) and The List of Adrian Messenger (1963). Douglas had previously filmed another A.B. Guthrie novel, The Big Sky.

Filming took place in Tucson, Arizona, and various places in Oregon, including Bend, Christmas Valley, and the sand dunes and lost forest in Crooked River Gorge.

== Reception ==
Though noted for its exceptional cast and professional cinematography, the film had mixed reviews—often cool to the work of the director and scriptwriter—and was commonly described as something less than the classic work of contemporary Western-movie director John Ford. It was described as lacking consistent story lines, being a collection of disjointed, rushed incidents, connected by long pauses and grand scenery. It gained some notoriety for its sexual themes and innuendos, beyond the movie norms of the year when it debuted (1967).

While critic Roger Ebert gave it mild praise, other modern reviewers in The New York Times, TV Guide, Variety and others gave it middle-to-low marks. Metacritic averaged the modern reviews as a 42% rating.

== Citations ==
Bibliography

University of Southern California Division of Cinema; American Film Institute; Center for Understanding Media (1967). Filmfacts 1967. pp. 146–248.
