= The Big Sky (film) =

1952 film

- Film poster
- Directed by: Howard Hawks
- Screenplay by: Dudley Nichols
- Based on: The Big Sky; 1949 novel by A.B. Guthrie Jr.
- Produced by: Howard Hawks
- Starring: Kirk Douglas; Dewey Martin; Elizabeth Threatt; Arthur Hunnicutt
- Cinematography: Russell Harlan
- Edited by: Christian Nyby
- Music by: Dimitri Tiomkin
- Production company: Winchester Pictures Corporation
- Distributed by: RKO Radio Pictures
- Release dates: July 29, 1952 (Chicago); August 19, 1952 (New York); August 20, 1952 (Los Angeles)
- Running time: 122 minutes
- Country: United States
- Language: English
- Box office: $1.65 million (U.S. rentals)

The Big Sky is a 1952 American Western film produced and directed by Howard Hawks and starring Kirk Douglas, Dewey Martin, Elizabeth Threatt and Arthur Hunnicutt. The screenplay was written by Dudley Nichols based on the novel of the same name by A.B. Guthrie Jr.

== Plot ==
In 1832, Jim Deakins is traveling in the Kentucky wilderness when he encounters the hostile Boone Caudill. However, they soon become close friends and head together to St. Louis on the Missouri River in search of Boone's uncle Zeb Calloway. They find him when they are jailed for brawling with fur traders. When "Frenchy" Jourdonnais posts Zeb's bail, Zeb persuades him to pay for Jim and Boone as well.

The two men join an expedition organized by Zeb and Frenchy, who owns a sailing barge called Mandan. Accompanied by 30 other trappers, they begin to travel 2,000 miles (3,218.7 km) up the Missouri and into the Yellowstone River to seek trade with the Blackfoot Indians, in competition with the Missouri Fur Company. Zeb's companion Teal Eye is a pretty Blackfoot woman who had escaped from an enemy tribe years earlier. Zeb plans to return her to her father, a chief, and his family to establish trade with the tribe. Zeb encounters Poordevil, another Blackfoot whom he knows, and invites him along. Early in the journey, Teal Eye falls into the river and Boone rescues her from the rapids.

The Missouri Company knows about the threat to its monopoly represented by the Mandan's excursion. A party led by their henchman Streak captures Teal Eye and tries to burn the boat, but Frenchy awakens before the fire can cause much damage. Poordevil tracks the enemy and Boone and Jim rescue Teal Eye. The expedition confronts the company at their trading post and leaves a warning not to further interfere. A week later, they repulse an attack by Crow Indians. Jim is separated from the group and shot in the leg. Boone, followed by Teal Eye and Poordevil, finds Boone, extracts the bullet and waits for him to heal. When they rejoin their band, they find Streak trying to buy the boat and the goods on it. Jim compares the bullet extracted from his leg with one of Streak's and finds them to be identical. Streak and his men are killed in the ensuing shootout.

The expedition finally reaches the Blackfoot village and begins trading. Jim is disappointed when Teal Eye tells him that she loves him, but as a brother, and not romantically. Boone follows her to her teepee, and he and Teal Eye both admit their attraction to each other. When Boone later emerges, the tribe is celebrating. Boone is surprised to learn that all now consider him and Teal Eye to be married. Later, Teal Eye forces Boone buy her from her father so that he will be free to leave her whenever he wishes. With winter approaching, the men of the Mandan prepare their boat for the long trip back. After some hestitation, Boone accompanies them, abandoning Teal Eye. Jim confides to Zeb that, unlike Boone, he would not have left if Teal Eye had chosen him instead. Later that evening, Boone changes his mind and returns to Teal Eye, which pleases Jim greatly, and the men remain friends.

== Cast ==
- Kirk Douglas as Jim Deakins
- Dewey Martin as Boone Caudill
- Elizabeth Threatt as Teal Eye
- Arthur Hunnicutt as Zeb Calloway
- Buddy Baer as Romaine
- Steven Geray as "Frenchy" Jourdonnais
- Henri Letondal as Labadie
- Hank Worden as Poordevil
- Jim Davis as Streak

== Release ==
The film's world premiere was held at the Woods Theatre in Chicago on July 29, 1952, with Douglas, Martin and Hawks in attendance. The theater was filled to standing-room-only capacity for the first time in six years.

== Reception ==
In a contemporary review for The New York Times, critic A. H. Weiler called the film as "a saga as long as the day and as big as all outdoors" and wrote: "The two-hour-and-twenty-minute running time of 'The Big Sky' is much too long. Also, Mr. Hawks has not delved too deeply into the psychological urges and the dreams which drive the pioneer northwest. But the fact that he has indicated the flavor of the period, the beauty of an unsullied countryside and, above all, the nature of some of those daring few is enough."

A Chicago Tribune reviewer also noted the film's excessive length, which was later reduced from 140 minutes to 122 minutes for the film's general release, and wrote: "While it is a detailed and serious appreciation of the struggles of the pioneers, it is also generally well balanced, with bits of earthy humor providing frequent light momenta. Altho this film is absorbing and well directed, I think it could have been vastly improved by some color photography and some cutting, especially in the final scenes."

Critic Edwin Schallert of the Los Angeles Times called the film "one of the year's better rugged achievements" and wrote: "Hawks avoided making another 'Red River' of this production, even though it deals with similar primitive days in America. That is unquestionably its great advantage. Like that earlier picture, however, it invokes the finer realities of the outdoor drama. ... 'The Big Sky,' once it really gets on its way, gives you the impression that much of it is really happening, and under great duress."

== Awards ==
| Award | Category | Nominee(s) | Result | Ref. |
|---|---|---|---|---|
| Academy Awards | Best Supporting Actor | Arthur Hunnicutt | Nominated | |
| Academy Awards | Best Cinematography – Black-and-White | Russell Harlan | Nominated | |
| Directors Guild of America Awards | Outstanding Directorial Achievement in Motion Pictures | Howard Hawks | Nominated | |

== Soundtrack ==
The eight-minute suite for The Big Sky was rerecorded in London by the National Philharmonic Orchestra in December 1975 and released on the album Lost Horizon: The Classic Film Scores of Dimitri Tiomkin (1976). It was rereleased on compact disc in 1991 and 2010.

The original film soundtrack was restored by the Brigham Young University Film Music Archives for a 2003 compact disc release including 28 tracks and nearly 80 minutes of orchestral music.

== Home media ==
- 1988 Turner Home Entertainment, RKO Collection, VHS, ISBN 1-55960-014-4

== Sources ==
- Farber, Manny. 2009. Farber on Film: The Complete Film Writings of Manny Farber. Edited by Robert Polito. Library of America. ISBN 978-1-59853-050-6
