= The Last Hunt (novel) =

1954 novel by Milton Lott

- First edition
- Author: Milton Lott
- Cover artist: William Barss
- Language: English
- Genre: Western (genre)
- Publisher: Houghton Mifflin
- Publication date: 1954
- Publication place: United States
- Media type: Print (Hardcover)
- Pages: 399

The Last Hunt is a 1954 western novel by Milton Lott, written while he was in one of George R. Stewart's classes. Lott worked on the novel while in school, and received a fellowship from Houghton Mifflin to finish the book. The book was later made into a film of the same name. It was published in German by the Deutsche Hausbücherei in 1956 as Die letzte Jagd.

The story is set in the 19th century, and deals with the lives of two men whose cattle herd is wiped out by a storm. The men subsequently go into the buffalo-hunting business. The novel deals with their life in the trade, including a fight with Indians and the shooting of a white buffalo.

The Pulitzer Prize jury selected The Last Hunt for the 1955 fiction prize, but John Hohenberg convinced the Pulitzer board that William Faulkner was long overdue for the award, despite A Fable being a lesser work of his, and the board overrode the jury's selection, much to the disgust of its members.
