= Elizabeth Threatt =

American actress (1926–1993)

Elizabeth Coyote Threatt (April 12, 1926 – November 22, 1993) was an American model and actress, best known for her starring role in Howard Hawks's 1952 film The Big Sky, where she is in a love triangle with Kirk Douglas and Dewey Martin. It was her only film appearance, and all dialogue spoken by Threatt was in the depicted Native American language. She was spotted by Howard Hawks and cast for the part of an Indian princess being returned to her home by white traders to help a trade deal. Threatt left the film industry (and acting) after this one film.

Threatt was born in Kershaw, South Carolina on April 12, 1926, the daughter of William Threatt, a Cherokee Indian employed by the US army, and his wife, Bessie Pearl Furr. She died in Concord, North Carolina aged 67.

== Filmography ==
- The Big Sky (1952)
