= Wagon train =

Group of wagons traveling together

A wagon train is a group of wagons traveling together. Before the extensive use of military vehicles, baggage trains followed an army with supplies and ammunition.

In the American West, settlers traveling across the plains and mountain passes in covered wagons banded together for mutual assistance. Although wagon trains are associated with the Old West, the Trekboers of South Africa also traveled in caravans of covered wagons.

== In migration ==
=== Transit, traces, and trails ===
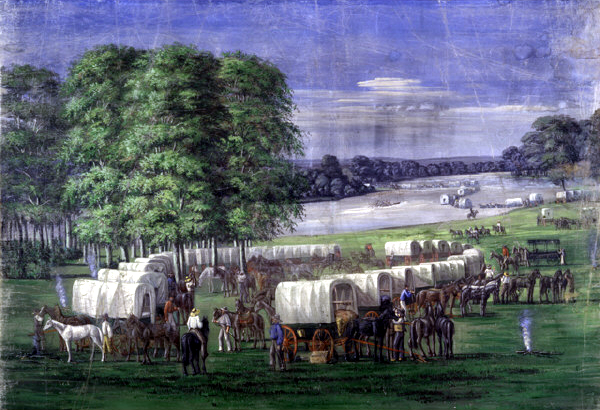
Pioneers crossing the plains of Nebraska

Wagon trains followed several trails in the American West, nearly all originating at Independence, Missouri. Perhaps the most famous wagon train trail was the Oregon Trail which had a span of over 2,000 mi (3,200 km). Other paths included the Santa Fe Trail, the Chisholm Trail, the California Trail (which split southwestward from the Oregon Trail), the Mormon Trail, and the Old Spanish Trail.

Although "wagon train" suggests a line of wagons, when terrain permitted, wagons would often fan out and travel abreast to minimize the amount of dust blown onto other wagons. Travel by wagon train occurred primarily between the 1840s–1880s, diminishing after completion of the first transcontinental railroad. Some remnants of wagon ruts along the well-traveled trails are still visible today.

=== Organization ===
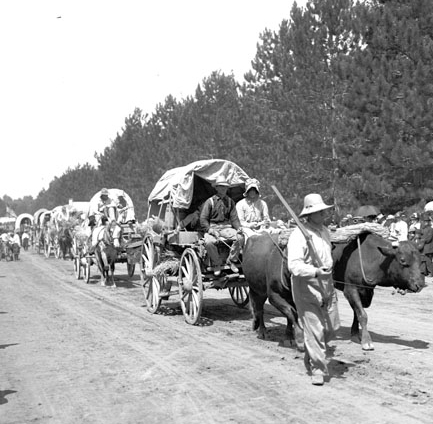
1912 Pioneer Day re-enactment of a wagon train in Utah

Westward movement originally began in small groups, but well-funded travelers with 100 or more wagons could employ professional wagon masters (or trail masters) and hostlers.

Overland emigrants discovered smaller groups of 20 to 40 wagons were more manageable than larger ones, especially without professional wagon masters. Many operated under democratic principles, creating bylaws and electing a captain. In reality, a captain had limited authority. His role was largely confined to getting everyone moving in the morning and selecting when and where to camp at night.

Membership of wagon trains was generally fluid and wagons frequently joined or left trains depending on the needs and wishes of their owners. An accident or illness, for instance, may force someone to fall behind and wait for the next train, or an emigrant might "whip up" to overtake a forward train after a quarrel. Some might break away to settle in Colorado Territory or other territories along the way.

At night, wagon trains were often formed into a circle or square for shelter from wind or weather, and to corral the emigrants' animals in the center to prevent them from running away or being stolen by Native Americans. While Native Americans might attempt to raid horses under the cover of darkness, they rarely attacked a train. Contrary to popular belief, wagons were rarely circled defensively.

=== Modern-day treks ===
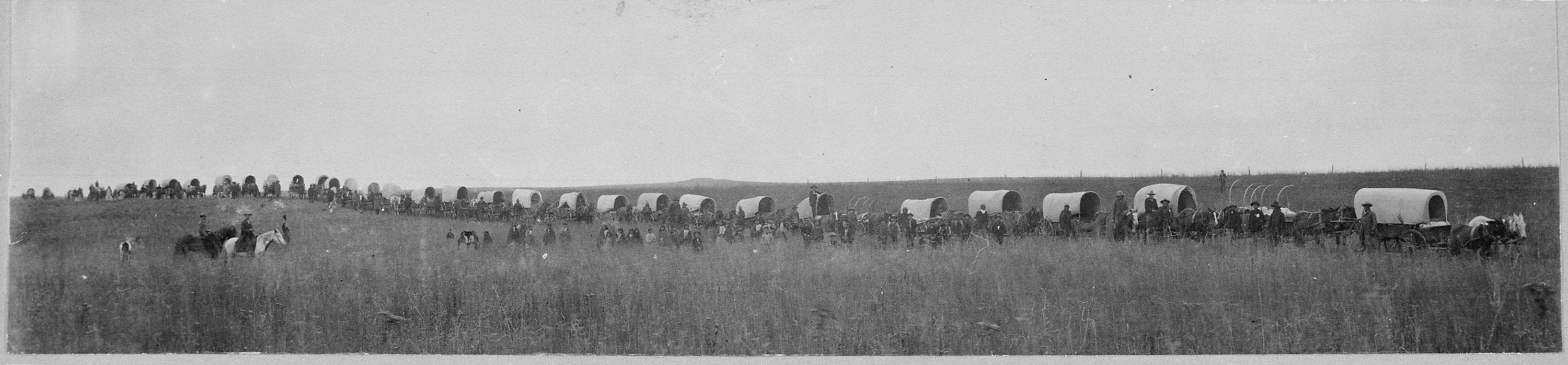
Native American teams hauling 60 miles (97 km) to market the 1,100 bushels of wheat raised by the school at Seger Colony, Oklahoma Territory, c. 1900

Today, covered wagon trains are used to give an authentic experience for those desiring to explore the West as it was in the days of the pioneers and other groups traveling before modern vehicles were invented.

== Baggage trains ==
The advent of gunpowder warfare meant that an army could no longer rely solely on foraging in the surrounding countryside, and required a regular supply of munitions. In the 18th century, organized commissary and quartermaster departments were developed to centralize delivery of supplies. The delivery took the form of "baggage trains", large groups of wagons that traveled at the rear of the main army.

== In popular media ==
Westward-bound collective treks are reflected in numerous books, films, and television programs about the journeys. Examples include: Emerson Hough's 1922 novel and James Cruze's silent film based on it, The Covered Wagon (1923); Raoul Walsh's film The Big Trail (1930); Robert North Bradbury's film Westward Ho (1935); John Ford's Wagon Master (1950) and the television series it inspired, Wagon Train (1957–1965); William A. Wellman's film, Westward the Women (1951); A. B. Guthrie Jr.'s 1949 novel The Way West and Andrew V. McLaglen's 1967 film based on it; and the "Wagons West" series of 24 novels written by Noel Gerson (under the pseudonym Dana Fuller Ross) between 1979 and 1989.

== See also ==
- Cavalcade
- Conestoga wagon
- Convoy
- Covered wagon
- Laager
- War wagon
