= Rewrite man =

Journalist who writes stories from information reported by others

The rewrite man (rewrite person) is a newspaper reporter who works in the office, not on the street, taking information reported by others and crafting it into stories. It is rarely used as an actual title, however. The term is something of a misnomer since rewrite men or women do not just "rewrite"; they take notes gathered by on-the-scene-reporters, information gathered by telephone, or information from wire services or clippings from other newspapers, and combine them as they write each article.

The job has lost much of its importance due to technology that allows reporters to write and transmit articles from the field. In the pre-computer days of newspaper work, however, it was vital. At the most extreme example, reporters on deadline would telephone into the newsroom and dictate their notes to an editor – hence the movie cliché of reporters rushing to telephone booths and shouting "Get me rewrite!" into the phone.

A rewrite man didn't leave the office. He, or in rare instances she, would take calls from reporters who quickly needed to relay information for a story.

Sometimes an entire front page, with bylines from several different reporters, will have actually been written by a single rewrite man working with an editor.

Some rewrite men spent all or most of their careers in the job; others learned how to do it while acquiring additional skills.

Rewrite men are common at large national magazines, where reporters handle the reporting of the story while a writer takes the material and writes the actual article. In this case, the reporter will put all the information and quotes gathered into a multipage file which is then given to the writer. In cases of a story in several areas, several reporters will give their files to the writer. Time magazine also used to engage rewrite men almost exclusively, although it has all but abandoned the practice as of its 2008 redesign.

One example of a legendary rewrite man was the late Phillip O'Connor, who worked for 40 years for the Chicago Sun-Times and Chicago Daily News. Among the last of his breed, O'Connor was known for his speed and accuracy in compiling a story in less than 15 minutes under deadline pressure.

== Sources ==
- Pérez-peña, Richard (December 18, 2015). "Get Me Rewrite!". New York Times.
