= Joseph Pulitzer Jr. =

American newspaperman and publisher (1913–1993)

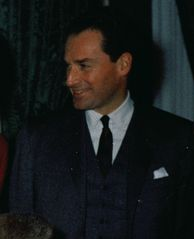
- Pulitzer at the White House in 1961
- Born: May 13, 1913; St. Louis, Missouri
- Died: May 26, 1993 (aged 80); St. Louis, Missouri
- Occupation: Publisher

Joseph Pulitzer III (May 13, 1913 – May 26, 1993) was an American newspaperman and publisher of the St. Louis Post-Dispatch for 38 years. A grandson of the famous newsman Joseph Pulitzer, for 31 years he chaired the board which was responsible for awarding the Pulitzer Prize, and from 1955 to 1993 was chairman of the Pulitzer Publishing Company.

== Biography ==
Born in St. Louis, Missouri on May 13, 1913, he was baptized in the Episcopal Church as Joseph Pulitzer III, but later adopted the junior designation (his father had dropped the junior designation after the death of his father). A graduate of the St. Mark's School and Harvard University, Pulitzer ran the St. Louis Post-Dispatch through the social and political challenges of the 20th century while holding fast to the liberal vision set out by his grandfather in 1907. His paper was among the first to oppose the Vietnam War.

He served as chairman of the Pulitzer Prize Board at Columbia University for 31 years and was the last member of the Pulitzer family to directly participate in the Prize process to date. Along with Columbia University president William J. McGill and Pulitzer Prize administrator John Hohenberg, he oversaw its transition from an advisory group under the aegis of the Columbia trustees to the principal award-granting body in 1975. The board, which had been established by his grandfather's will, is responsible for selecting the coveted annual prizes in journalism, books, drama and music.

In 1993, he received an honorary doctorate of laws degree from Washington University in St. Louis.

In addition to his reputation as a newsman, Pulitzer was also known for his collection of contemporary art, regarded as one of the largest and finest in the world. In 2008, his second wife, Emily Rauh Pulitzer, gave a gift of 31 major works of modern and contemporary art and $45 million to the Harvard Art Museum. In announcing the gift, the museum also announced that between 1953 and 2005 it had received gifts of 43 other modern and contemporary works from Pulitzer and his first wife, Louise Vauclain Pulitzer, who died in 1968, and from Pulitzer and his second wife.

Pulitzer died at his home in the Central West End of St. Louis from colon cancer. He was 80.

== See also ==
- Pulitzer Arts Foundation

== Sources ==
- Caskets on Parade
