= Jubilee (opera) =

Opera by Ulysses Kay

Jubilee is an opera in three acts composed by Ulysses Kay to a libretto by Donald Dorr. The opera is based on the narrative in Margaret Walker's 1966 novel Jubilee which described her biracial grandmother's experiences as a slave and then as a free woman during the Reconstruction Era. It was first performed on 20 November 1976 in Jackson, Mississippi by Opera South who had commissioned the work for the U.S. Bicentennial. The premiere performance was conducted by James DePreist with Hilda Harris as Vyry, the opera's protagonist. Jubilee was revived by Opera South in 1977 and then disappeared after Margaret Walker threatened to sue if there were any further performances.
