= Katemcy, Texas =

- Unincorporated community
- Location within the state of Texas Katemcy, Texas (the United States)
- Coordinates: 30°54′46″N 99°15′14″W
- Country: United States
- State: Texas
- County: Mason
- Elevation: 1,680 ft (512 m)
- Time zone: UTC-6 (Central (CST))
  - Summer (DST): UTC-5 (CDT)
- Area code: 325
- FIPS code: 48-38464
- GNIS feature ID: 1380020

Katemcy is an unincorporated community on Katemcy Creek in Mason County, Texas, United States. The community is located on Ranch to Market Road 1222, one mile east of U.S. Highway 87. The creek and the community were named after Penateka Comanche Chief Ketemoczy (Katemcy), who gave John O. Meusebach the nickname El Sol Colorado (The Red Sun) because of his red hair. Ketemoczy was also one of the chiefs who signed the Fort Martin Scott Treaty.

== Early settlement ==
The community was originally named Cootsville after colonist Andrew Jackson Coots. Settlers began moving in during the late 19th century.

In 1879, Doctor William Flemon Cowan, and his spouse, midwife Mary Ann Primm Cowan, moved to the community from Limestone County. The plot of land on which they settled became the community of Katemcy. Dr. and Mrs. Cowan provided medical services to the settlers by riding horseback throughout the county. In the style of the day, Mrs. Cowan rode sidesaddle in a riding skirt.

Dr. Cowan's sons John, Elias and Alfred ran a sawmill, gristmill and cotton gin.

== School ==
Baptist minister Lawson Jones donated land in 1883 for the construction of Friendship School. A community collection provided the building fund, and J.M. Heatherly became the first teacher of the one-room school. Funding for the school came from tuition, which could be off-set for needy families by having their child perform chores at the school. A public school was later built in Katemcy, and the Friendship School was moved and became the Friendship Baptist Church.

== Post office ==
Alfred R. Cowan was appointed postmaster when Katemcy received its post office on November 17, 1884.

== Later years ==
Katemcy became attractive to settlers with its inexpensive acreage and bountiful water supply. The area received its first telephone in 1914. Local farms were often tenant farms, an arrangement that contributed to the thriving rural community that supported three churches, a school, two doctors, two general stores, two blacksmith shops, and a cotton gin. By 1920, the tractor had replaced a lot of field hands, and farm employment began to disappear. The population began its decline in 1925. The Katemcy school system was consolidated with Mason in 1945. The population was about 90 people in 1990. Today, the rural community population remains small.

== Notable person ==
Actor Dewey Martin was a native of Katemcy.
