= Kings Will Be Tyrants =

1959 novel by Ward Hawkins

- Cover of 1959 McGraw-Hill first edition hardback
- Author: Ward Hawkins
- Cover artist: William Hoffman
- Language: English
- Genre: War novel
- Publisher: Random House
- Publication date: 1959
- Publication place: United States
- Media type: Print (Hardcover)
- OCLC: 1377902

Kings Will Be Tyrants by Ward Hawkins is a 1959 novel about fighting in Cuba. Bernardo Manuel Patrick O'Brien is a former U.S. Marine who winds up fighting for Castro. Though a Marine, he has to deal with the conflict of his heritage, both Cuban and American.

== Critical reception ==
According to Ed Sullivan of The Sunday Ledger-Enquirer: "Hawkins does a pretty good job of writing an action story, compelling on the surface, but sadly lacking the spice of underlying causes and effects which make such stories not only readable but valuable footnotes to history."
