= Daniel Boone (1960 TV series) =

Daniel Boone is a four-part television series that aired on Walt Disney Presents on ABC. Two episodes aired in December 1960 and two others in March 1961.

The miniseries was loosely based on Kentucky pioneer Daniel Boone. It starred Dewey Martin as Boone and Mala Rudolph as his wife, Rebecca Boone. (The actress who played Rebecca Boone is listed as Mala Powers in two reference books: Douglas Brode's Shooting Stars of the Small Screen: Encyclopedia of TV Western Actors, 1946–Present and Vincent Terrace's Encyclopedia of Television Shows, 1925 through 2010.)
