= Flight to Fury =

1964 film by Monte Hellman

- Directed by: Monte Hellman
- Screenplay by: Jack Nicholson
- Story by: Monte Hellman; Fred Roos
- Produced by: Eddie Romero; Fred Roos
- Starring: Dewey Martin; Fay Spain; Jack Nicholson
- Cinematography: Mike Accion
- Edited by: Joven Calub; Monte Hellman
- Music by: Nestor Robles
- Production companies: Filipinas Productions; Lippert, Inc.
- Distributed by: Feature Film Corp. of America
- Release date: November 5, 1964
- Running time: 74 minutes (original); 80 minutes (Buenos Aires International Festival of Independent Cinema)
- Countries: United States; Philippines (Cordillera)
- Languages: English; Filipino
- Budget: US$80.000

Flight to Fury is a 1964 film starring Jack Nicholson, Fay Spain, Vic Diaz and Dewey Martin. The film was directed by Monte Hellman and filmed back to back with Back Door to Hell in the Philippines in 1964.

Nicholson was one of the writers of the screenplay. The film is about a battle over stolen jewels after a plane crash in the Philippines. A version in Filipino titled Cordillera, directed by Eddie Romero, was also released.

== Plot ==
An American man identifying himself as a tourist, Jay Wickham, introduces himself to Joe Gaines in an Asian casino. After accompanying Lei Ling to her room, Wickham begins searching for a cache of diamonds believed to be in her possession, but is unable to find them.

On the only available plane leaving for the Philippines, the passengers include Gaines, Wickham and Ling, along with a man named Ross who is Ling's associate and carrying the diamonds, Lorgren (the rightful owner of the gems) and the latter's mistress, Destiny Cooper. A crash landing results in the death of some and serious injury to Ross, who hands Joe the gems before he dies.

Natives begin approaching the plane, ready to kill any survivors and take their possessions. Wickham finds the jewels, kills Lorgren, shoots Destiny and flees, but is wounded by Joe. Before he dies, Wickham tosses the diamonds into a river, as Joe awaits the dangerous natives and his fate.

== Cast ==
- Dewey Martin as Joe Gaines
- Jack Nicholson as Jay Wickham
- Fay Spain as Destiny Cooper
- Vic Díaz as Lorgren
- Joseph Estrada as Garuda
- John Hackett as Al Ross
- Jacqueline Hellman as Gloria Walsh
- Lucien Pan as Police Inspector
- Juliet Prado as Lei Ling
- Jennings Sturgeon as Bearded Man

== Production ==
The film was based on an outline by Hellman and Fred Roos. Jack Nicholson adapted it into a script over a three-week period on a boat from the US to the Philippines. They did it as a homage to Beat the Devil and the film was originally entitled The Devils Game.

Hellman directed the film while editing Back Door to Hell at the same time. He fell ill in between directing the two films.

Lino Brocka worked as Hellman's assistant.

== Reception ==
Lippert was unhappy with the comedic tone of the film and had it re-edited for its theatrical release losing 11 minutes. Hellman was able to re-insert the footage for the video release.

== Cordillera ==
Eddie Romero directed a Filipino language version of the film titled Cordillera for release in the Philippines. According to Romero, he added some scenes and slightly changed the story.
