= Milton Lott =

American writer (1916–1996)

Milton Lott (1916–1996) was an American author of western novels. He grew up in the Snake River Valley, in Idaho and attended University of California, Berkeley. While there he started writing his first published novel, The Last Hunt. He worked on the novel while attending an English class taught by George R. Stewart, himself a well published author. Lott received a citation from the National Institute of Letters and Arts for The Last Hunt, and was granted a Literacy Fellowship Award by Houghton Mifflin to finish the book. The Last Hunt was selected by the Pulitzer fiction jury for the 1955 Pulitzer Prize, but John Hohenberg convinced the Pulitzer board that William Faulkner was long overdue for the award, despite his submitted novel A Fable being a lesser work of his, and the board overrode the jury's selection, much to the disgust of its members. The Last Hunt was made into a 1957 movie.

== Works ==
- The Last Hunt, Houghton Mifflin (October, 1954)
- Dance Back the Buffalo, Houghton Mifflin (1959)
- Backtrack, Houghton Mifflin (1965)
