= A Tract of Time =

1966 novel by Smith Hempstone

- Cover of 1966 Houghton Mifflin first edition. Dust jacket illustration by William Hoffman.
- Author: Smith Hempstone
- Language: English
- Genre: Vietnam War novel
- Publisher: Houghton Mifflin
- Publication date: 1966
- Publication place: United States
- Media type: Print (hardcover)

A Tract of Time is an antiwar novel from 1966 by Smith Hempstone, that covers the time period about 1960, when there was an attempted coup of South Vietnamese President Ngo Dinh Diem. Even as the United States backed Diem's government during the war, its American advisers worked with the Montagnard people who opposed Diem, to help them fight the Viet Cong, whom they also opposed. The book follows one CIA operative, Harry Coltart, as he works with the Montagnard mountain tribesmen in the Central Highlands. Harry is initially successful in getting the Montagnards to fight against the Viet Cong, but then the Montagnards are betrayed and South Vietnamese troops are sent in. Harry has to be rescued as the Montagnards join the Viet Cong.

The book has been considered to be an important novel from the time, and has been cited in at least one history book. It was listed in Firsts: The Book Collector's Magazine in a list of the top 51 Vietnam War novels.

== Editions ==
- Avon paperback
