= Jacob Scher (journalist) =

Former journalist (1908–1961)

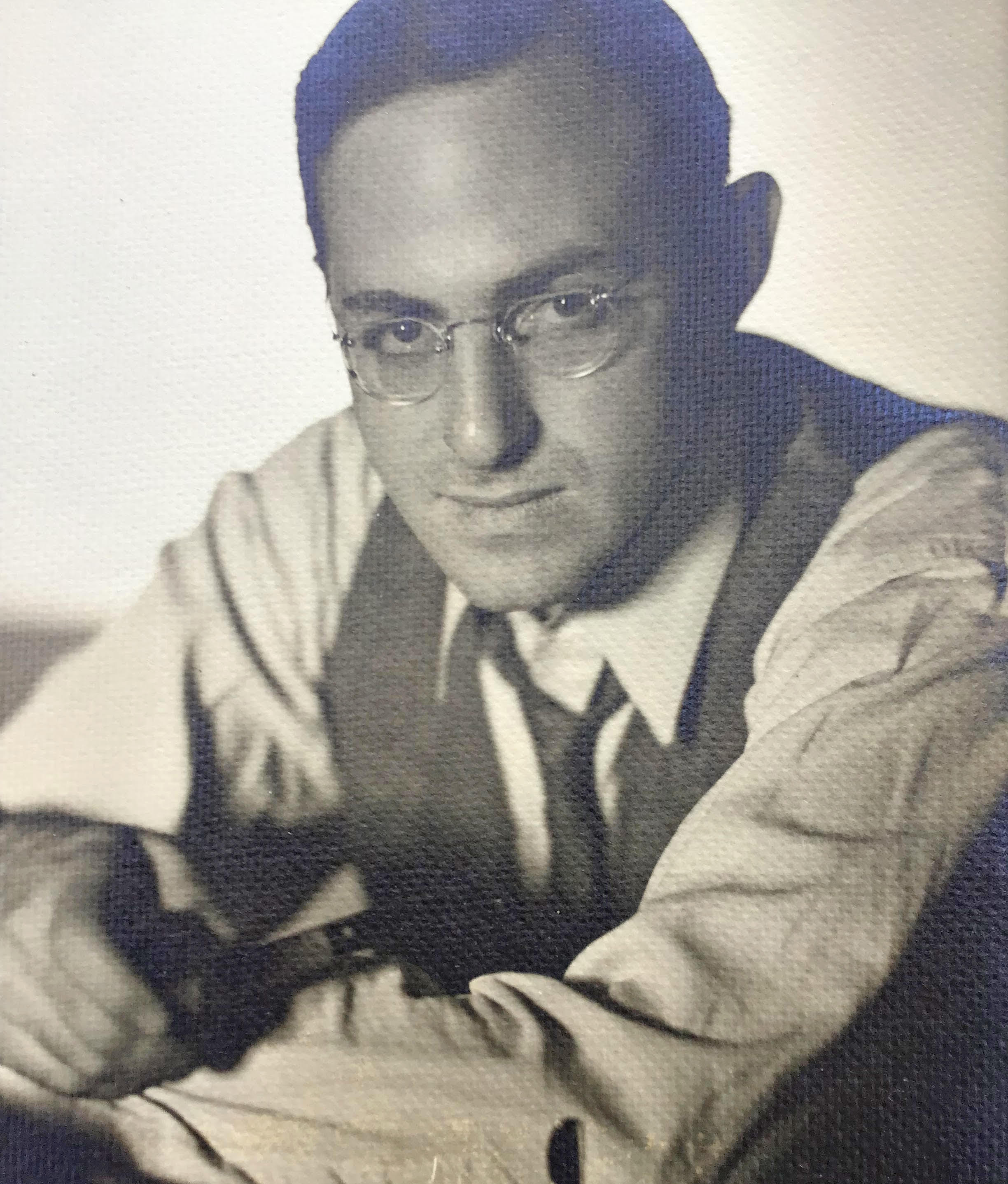
- Born: May 25, 1908; Chicago, Illinois, United States
- Died: September 27, 1961 (aged 53); Chicago, Illinois, United States
- Education: University of Illinois
- Occupations: Journalist, lawyer, journalism professor

Jacob Scher (May 25, 1908 – September 27, 1961) was an American journalist, lawyer and tenured journalism professor at the Medill School of Journalism at Northwestern University in Evanston, Illinois.

A leading authority on public access to information, who championed the "people's right to know," Scher served as chief counsel for the U.S. House of Representatives Subcommittee on Access to Government Information, in Washington, D.C. Headed by Representative John E. Moss of California, the committee was created in 1955 to investigate cases of news suppression by government agencies, a precursor to the Freedom of Information Act (FOIA). The Freedom of Information Act took 12 years to get through Congress.

"To me," Scher wrote, "the basis of civil rights is freedom of speech, freedom of the press and freedom of association. You can't apprise your fellow man of injustice if you can't talk about it."

== Life and career ==
Born in Chicago to Jewish immigrants from Lithuania and Latvia, Scher earned his undergraduate and law degrees from the University of Illinois, the latter in 1931. He practiced law in Chicago for five years and was later qualified to practice before the Supreme Court.

During the Great Depression, Scher joined the Federal Writers' Project (FWP), a job-creating government program. Established in 1935 by President Franklin Delano Roosevelt as part of the Works Progress Administration (WPA) and the New Deal, the Writers' Project generated a variety of jobs and publications.

Scher co-edited Illinois: A Descriptive and Historical Guide, published in 1939 and later reissued as The WPA Guide to Illinois. As a member of the WPA's Illinois Writers' Project, Scher was on a roster that included Saul Bellow, Studs Terkel, Margaret Walker and Richard Wright.

Moving for a time to Santa Fe, New Mexico, he co-edited New Mexico: A Guide to the Colorful State, published in 1940 and later reissued as The WPA Guide to 1930s New Mexico.

His newspaper experience included the Chicago Sun-Times (and a precursor, the Chicago Times), Chicago Tribune, United Press International and City News Bureau of Chicago. In addition to serving as Chicago correspondent for the New York Post, Scher did stints at California's Oakland Tribune and the Nashville Tennessean. Among his job titles were assistant city editor, reporter, copy editor and rewrite man.

In 1947, Scher joined the faculty of the Medill School of Journalism at Northwestern. Living with his family in Highland Park he taught both undergraduate and graduate courses including press history, press law and press ethics, earning a reputation as a demanding and inspiring teacher.

Putting his news experience into print, Scher and colleague Howard B. Taylor co-authored the textbook Copy Reading and News Editing, published in 1951. Scher also hosted the public affairs radio and TV program Frankly Speaking on the CBS outlet WBBM in Chicago.

Scher was appointed special counsel to the House's government information subcommittee in 1955 and chief counsel in 1960. Subcommittee staff director Sam Archibald called him the "nation's leading expert on the people's right to know."

As counsel for the American Society of News Editors, he represented the organization in lawsuits involving constitutional guarantees of freedom of press and speech.

== Issues and views ==
In an essay about executive privilege, Scher wrote: "An open society demands that public officials be accountable for their conduct to the people and the people's representatives."

Bruce Oudes, a former student of Scher at Northwestern, summarized Scher's views in his book From: The President, Richard Nixon's Secret Files, which he dedicated to Scher. Oudes wrote that in the 1950s, Scher became increasingly focused on developing lawful mechanisms for journalists to access government documents in order to provide the public with a fuller understanding of governmental activity. Scher concluded that laws were needed to establish procedures for the systematic review and release of such materials, enabling the public to compare the government's actions with its official statements.

== Death and legacy ==
Scher died of cancer in Chicago at the age of 53. Six years later, in 1967, the Freedom of Information Act went into effect, becoming the landmark law that keeps citizens in the know about the government. For more than two decades following his death, the Chicago chapter of Women in Communications, Inc. presented the Jacob Scher Award for Investigative Reporting, honoring reporters in print and broadcast journalism.

Scher's great nephew, journalist and author Jake Tapper, of CNN, was named for him.
