= Avalon (novel) =

1965 novel by Anya Seton

- First edition
- Author: Anya Seton
- Cover artist: William Hoffman
- Language: English
- Genre: Historical Romance
- Publisher: Houghton Mifflin
- Publication date: November 8, 1965
- Publication place: United States
- Media type: Print (Hardback & Paperback)
- Pages: 440

Cover of the 2006 reprint

Avalon is a 1965 novel by the American author Anya Seton.

It is a fictional story about Romieux "Rumon" de Provence and Merewyn, set against a broad historical background of Anglo-Saxon England and the Viking expansion to Iceland and Greenland. It follows their journey and acceptance into the English royal court, Merewyn's kidnapping by Vikings, Rumon's epic search for her and their ultimate reunion back in England.

A 2007 edition features a foreword by Phillipa Gregory.

== Plot summary ==
The story begins in the year 972, when Romieux de Provence, a young nobleman descended from Charlemagne and King Alfred, leaves his native Kingdom of Burgundy for England and the royal court of Edgar I. After being shipwrecked on the coast of Cornwall, Rumon encounters Merewyn, a teenage girl who claims to be a descendant of King Arthur. Merewyn leads him to her house, where Merewyn's dying mother, Breaca, reveals to Rumon that in fact, Merewyn is the product of her rape by a Viking warrior. This is later confirmed by the Prior of Padstow Monastery, who witnessed the Viking raid. Swearing Rumon to secrecy, Merewyn's mother charges Rumon to take the girl to her aunt Merwinna, Abbess of Romsey Abbey.

After the death of Merewyn's mother, Merewyn and Rumon make the journey from Cornwall to England. The party travel to Lydford where King Edgar is holding court. Rumon meets Dunstan, Archbishop of Canterbury, who befriends Rumon, and introduces him and Merewyn to King Edgar and his Queen, Alfrida. Edgar welcomes Rumon into the English Court, while Queen Alfrida employs Merewyn as one of her ladies-in-waiting. The two subsequently witness the King and Queen's coronation at Bath in 973; however, Dunstan catches Rumon in a romantic tryst with Queen Alfrida, and so takes Rumon away from the Royal party to settle at Glastonbury Abbey. Despite Merewyn meeting with her aunt Merwinna at the coronation, Queen Alfrida refuses to let her go to Romsey Abbey, and instead employs Merewyn.

A few years later, Rumon starts an illicit affair with Queen Alfrida, who is living in Corfe Castle after her husband's death. Merewyn learns of the affair, and leaves the employment of the Queen for Romsey Abbey. Rumon then witnesses Queen Alfrith's treachery and deception, which leads to the murder of the young King Edward in 978. Alfrida plans Edward's death in order to give the throne to her own son Æthelred, and promptly dumps Rumon after her plan succeeds. Disgusted, Rumon returns to Glastonbury Abbey, under the care of Dunstan who plans for Rumon to enter a religious life. Merewyn is also encouraged to enter a religious life by her aunt Merwinna, and her friend Elfled, who is staying with her at Romsey Abbey. Merewyn has unresolved feelings for Rumon however.

A Viking raid on Romsey Abbey weakens Merwinna, and causes her death. Merewyn embarks on a pilgrimage to Padstow to return her aunt's heart to the place of her birth. On the way, she goes to Glastonbury Abbey and encounters Rumon. Merewyn admits her feelings for Rumon, but he rejects her. Merewyn then continues to Padstow. Belatedly, Rumon realises that he too loves Merewyn, and follows her. However, Merewyn encounters another Viking raid, and is captured by Ketil, a Viking who raided Padstow years earlier. Ketil intends to rape Merewyn, but the Prior of Padstow Abbey informs him that he is Merewyn's father. By the time Rumon arrives at Padstow, Ketil has taken Merewyn away on a Viking Longship.

Rumon charts a ship, and embarks on a rescue journey overseas to find Merewyn. After stopping in Limerick, Ireland, Rumon's ship is caught in a storm and is blown off-course. The ship eventually finds the mouth of the Merrimack River on the coast of North America. There, Rumon encounters a Merrimack tribe who have been converted to Christianity by a group of Irish Culdee Monks. The tribe (under the influence of the Culdees) capture Rumon and his crew, and steal their ship. Meanwhile, Merewyn has settled in Iceland, where she lives with her father Ketil, and her new husband Sigurd. She also has a son called Orm. Rumon eventually escapes from the Culdees and tracks down Merewyn. Merewyn does not appreciate seeing Rumon, and promptly lets him know that she has settled into a new life. Rejected, Rumon returns to England alone. Ketil and his family then follow Erik the Red, and set sail to colonise Greenland in 985. The family attempt to make a living in the harsh climate of the new colony, and Merewyn gives birth to a mentally disabled daughter called Thora. Ketil, however, succumbs to old-age and dies on the Longship he used on Viking raids for so many years.

In the year 1000, Sigurd dies too, and Merewyn persuades her son Orm to take her and his sister to England. Merewyn wishes to find Rumon, but soon learns that he was ordained as a monk at Tavistock Abbey, and that he had famously defended the Abbey from a Viking raid. Merewyn then takes her family to Romsey Abbey where she finds that her old friend Elfled is now Abbess. Elfled takes in Thora, while Merewyn marries and settles with Wulfric, a wealthy thane of King Æthelred. Orm cannot settle into life in England however, and leaves to rejoin the Viking peoples. Merewyn then proceeds to rejoin the Royal Court as a Lady-in-waiting for Queen Ælfgifu and then Queen Emma. After gaining back her social status in the English nobility, finally Merewyn is summoned to Tavistock Abbey, where she reconciles with Rumon before he dies. Rumon makes one last request that Merewyn admit her true birth at court. She fulfills his wish, admitting her Viking parentage to the King and Queen. Queen Emma sympathises with Merewyn's story, and Merewyn's husband Wulfric declares that he does not care about her lineage. Merewyn then settles down to a comfortable life with Wulfric.

== Reception ==
Kirkus Reviews criticized the dialogue and characterization.
