= Backtrack (novel) =

1965 novel by Milton Lott

- Cover from the 1965 Houghton Mifflin hardback edition of Backtrack.
- Author: Milton Lott
- Cover artist: William Hoffman
- Language: English
- Genre: Western fiction
- Publisher: Houghton Mifflin
- Publication date: 1965
- Publication place: United States
- Media type: Print (hardcover)
- Pages: 248

Backtrack is a western novel by Milton Lott, published in 1965. The book is about a cattle drive from Texas to Montana, and features cowboy Ringo Rose and a Mexican boy whom he fathers. He teaches the kid skills he needs to survive, including gunfighting. When the kid shoots a man and flees, Ringo follows him across Texas to Ringo's former home. The book was made into a movie by Universal Studios in 1969.
