= A Girl, a Man, and a River =

1957 novel by Ward Hawkins

A Girl, A Man, and a River
- Cover of 1957 Popular Library paperback edition
- Author: Ward Hawkins
- Original title: The Floods of Fear
- Language: English
- Genre: Mystery
- Published: 1957 (Popular Library)
- Publication place: United States
- Media type: Print (paperback)

A Girl, A Man, and a River (1957) is a mystery story by John and Ward Hawkins which was originally written as a seven-part serial for the Saturday Evening Post and published in issues from January 21, 1956 until March 3, 1956. It was later published as a hardcover book The Floods of Fear by Dodd Mead/Penguin Putnam in 1956.

Cover of the 1956 Dodd Mead hardcover edition of The Floods of Fear, a Red Badge Detective novel.

It was published as Popular Library #824 in 1957.

The novel was filmed as Floods of Fear in 1959.
