= Walter O'Meara =

American writer

Walter O'Meara (1897 - 1989) was an American writer born in Minneapolis, Minnesota.

== Early life ==
O'Meara spent his childhood in Cloquet, Minnesota, graduating from Cloquet High School in 1914. O'Meara started his college education at the University of Minnesota before taking a leave of absence to serve in the US Army in World War I. Upon his return, he completed his studies in journalism at the University of Wisconsin–Madison, graduating Phi Beta Kappa in 1920.

== Career ==
O'Meara stayed on in Minnesota for several years, writing for the Duluth News Tribune. Following his time with the newspaper, he moved to Chicago to work for the advertising agency J. Walter Thompson. In 1932 he relocated to New York to work for the advertising agency Benton & Bowles, but in 1942 rejoined J. Walter Thompson, at their New York office.

O'Meara went on to act as the Chief of Planning for the Office of Strategic Services, as well as the head of the information department of the Office of Price Administration, during World War II. In 1950, following World War II, O'Meara decided to pursue a career in writing. Over the span of his career, he saw a number of magazine articles published, in addition to 16 books. Two of these books, Minnesota Gothic and Grand Portage, were best-sellers.

== Personal life ==
O'Meara was married in 1922 to Esther Arnold, with whom he had four children: Donn, Ellen, Deirdre, and Wolfe. They lived in several places including Washington Mews, NYC; Woodstock, NY; Bisbee, AZ; and Danbury, CT. He died in Massachusetts in 1989, at the age of 92.

== Bibliography ==
O'Meara is the author of a number of publications:

- Trees Went Forth, 1947
- Grand Portage, 1951
- Tales of the Two Borders, 1952
- Spanish Bride, 1954
- Minnesota Gothic, 1956
- Devil's Cross, 1957
- First Northwest Passage (Illustrated by Lorence Bjorklund), 1960
- Savage Country (Illustrated by Philip B. Parsons), 1960
- Last Portage (illustrated by William Hoffman), 1962
- Guns at the Forks, 1965
- Duke of War, 1966
- Daughters of the Country; The Women of the Fur Traders and Mountain Men, 1968
- Sioux are Coming (Illustrated by Lorence Bjorklund), 1971
- We Made It Through the Winter: A Memoir of Northern Minnesota Boyhood, 1974
- Guns at the Forks, 1979

== Additional resources ==
- The Walter O'Meara Papers are available for research use at the Minnesota Historical Society.
