= Donn O'Meara =

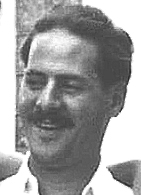
Donn O'Meara (c.1949)

Donn O'Meara (July 30, 1924 - September 8, 2004) was an author, linguist and anthropologist. His most well known book, Living Jewish was published in 1972.

== Early life and education ==
Son of noted American author Walter O'Meara and Esther (née Arnold) O'Meara, Donn's mixed, Irish and Ashkenazi Jewish heritage would prove a formative aspect of his life. O'Meara grew up in Minnesota and then lived in New York City as a teen. By the mid-1940s O'Meara had become fluent in several languages, eventually learning Spanish, French, Portuguese, Catalan, Italian, German, Japanese and Hebrew.

While attending Bard College, O'Meara recognized that he was Jewish due to being born of a Jewish mother. He spent the summer of 1942 in Williamsburg, Brooklyn. He arrived back at school in the fall able to speak Galitzianer Yiddish.

== Marriage and World War II ==
Prior to being drafted into World War II, O'Meara married a woman from Nicaragua named Cecilia Pereira. During the war worked in London, England for the OSS. O'Meara and Cecilia returned to Bard College after the war. They would parent five children together: Gabriel, Suzana, Miriam, Daniel and Dina.

== Professional life ==
O'Meara supported himself primarily through work in the advertising and public relations field in Caracas, New York and Rio de Janeiro.

== Living Jewish ==
While in Caracas, in 1972, O'Meara wrote Living Jewish which was published in 1978 in New York and London. For the book, O'Meara assumed the pseudonym, "Michael Asheri" explaining, "Who would buy a book like that by somebody named 'O'Meara'?" The book became a seminal guide to living as a religious Jew in the 1970s. It is divided into nine major sections not including the Preface, glossary and index.

=== Preface ===
Transliteration of Hebrews Words

=== Section 1: The Jewish People ===
1. Who Is a Jew? Cohen, Levi and Israel
2. Ashkenazim, Sephardim and Others
3. Offshoots of the Jews
4. The Languages of the Jews

=== Section 2: The Jewish Religion ===
5. One God and the Chosen People
6. What Is the Torah?

=== Section 3: The Jewish Life Cycle ===
7. Birth and Names
8. Circumcision
9. Pidyon ha Ben – Redemption of the Firstborn Son
10. Bar Mitzvah
11. Engagement and Marriage
12. The Marriage Ceremony and the Jewish Concept of Marriage
13. Divorce and Chalitza
14. Menstrual Uncleanness and the Mikva

=== Section 4: Illness, Medicine, Death, Burial and Mourning ===
15. Illness, Contraception, Abortion, Euthanasia and Suicide
16. Death
17. Burial
18. Mourning, Shiva, Kaddish, Yahrtzeit and Yizkor

=== Section 5: Daily Jewish Life ===
19. Morning, Afternoon and Evening
20. The Jewish Home – the Mezuza
21. Kashrut – the Dietary Laws
22. The Reasons Behind the Dietary Laws
23. Sabbath
24. Jewish Clothing and Personal Appearance
25. The Books of the Jews

=== Section 6: Prayer, Private and Communal ===
26. Private Prayer, Blessings and the Grace After Meals
27. Communal Prayer: the Synagogue, the Congregation and the Weekday Prayers
28. Sabbath Services in the Synagogue and the Priestly Blessing

=== Section 7: The Holidays ===
Introduction: Holidays, Major and Minor
The High Holidays
29. Rosh Hashana and Yom Kippur
30. Sukkot
31. Hoshana Rabba, Shmini Atzeret and Simchat Torah
32. Passover, Sefirat Ha-Omer and Lag B'Omer
33. Shavuot
The Minor Holidays
34. Chanukah
35. Purim
36. Tu B'Shvat, Rosh Chodesh and the Special Sabbaths
37. Fasts (Ta'anit)

=== Section 8: Just for Jews ===
38. The Jewish Calendar
39. Eretz Israel
40. Saints and Sinners
41. The Afterlife, the Messiah and the Soul
42. The Kabbalah
43. Education and Rabbinical Ordination
44. Orthodox, Conservative and Reform
45. Conversion to Judaism
46. Apostasy
47. A Jewish Miscellany

=== Section 9: Seen Through Jewish Eyes ===
48. The Gentiles
49. Enemies of the Jewish People
50. Friends of the Jews
51. Alcohol, Tobacco and Drugs
52. Charity
53. Sex
54. Science and Evolution

Appendices
I. Suitable Names for Jewish Children
II. Jewish Calendar, 5661 to 5760 (1900 to 2000 C.E.)
III. Civil Dates of Jewish Holidays, 1975-1999
IV. Commonly Used Blessings in Transliteration
Glossary
Index

== Move To Israel ==
In 1977, the O'Mearas moved to Israel where they settled in Petah Tikva. At that time Cecilia changed her name to "Zippora". O'Meara then began work for the Israel Military Industries Corporation until his retirement in the 1990s.

== In Literature ==
In Moose: Chapters From My Life (the posthumously published, 2013 autobiography of Academy Award winning songwriter, Robert B. Sherman) the author devotes a chapter to his time shared with his friend at Bard College. Sherman credits O'Meara with giving him the nickname, "Moose" which is also the title of the autobiography.
