= Operation Destruct =

1969 novel by Christopher Nicole

- Cover from the 1969 Holt, Rinehart and Winston hardcover edition of Operation Destruct by Christopher Nicole. Book jacket artist William Hoffman.
- Author: Christopher Nicole
- Cover artist: William Hoffman
- Language: English
- Series: Operations by Jonathan Anders Saga
- Genre: Spy novel
- Publisher: Holt, Rinehart and Winston
- Publication date: 1969
- Publication place: United States
- Media type: Print (Hardcover)
- ISBN: 0-03-075140-3
- OCLC: 4050
- LC Class: PZ7.N5594 Op
- Followed by: Operation Manhunt (1970)

Operation Destruct is a 1969 spy novel by Christopher Nicole written in the context of the Cold War and contests in international espionage between the West and the Soviet Union.

In his first novel, British intelligence assigns Agent Jonathan Anders to investigate the death of their agents aboard a Russian trawler. Agent Jonathan Anders promptly finds himself entangled in an international misadventure—with the Russians trying to exterminate him and the British police pursuing him for murder. He becomes involved in a contest against the Russian agents, survives an attempt on his life, and becomes aware of a Soviet plot to poison a lot of people.

On the way to investigate the hold of a Russian trawler sunk near Guernsey, he meets Helen and Clark Bridges—who just happen to cruise by later when agents for the Russian survivors, suspecting Jon's mission, try to drown him. He discovers that Madam Cantelna, a Nobel Prize winning marine biologist, has a complete lab on board, and vials of some icky and revolting stuff that almost makes Helen vomit. In his cross-country pursuit of Madam Cantelna, Jon travels beyond Scotland (after a preposterous stopover with a pop singer who supplies a jet) to the island rendezvous where Madam would meet another trawler and finish her research on population poisoning by fish pollution.
