= Floods of Fear =

1958 British film by Charles Crichton

- British quad poster
- Directed by: Charles Crichton
- Written by: Charles Crichton (screenplay); Vivienne Knight (additional dialogue)
- Based on: A Girl, a Man, and a River by John Hawkins and Ward Hawkins
- Produced by: Sydney Box
- Starring: Howard Keel; Anne Heywood; Cyril Cusack
- Cinematography: Christopher Challis
- Edited by: Peter Bezencenet
- Music by: Alan Rawsthorne
- Production company: Rank Organisation
- Distributed by: J. Arthur Rank Film Distributors (UK); Universal (US)
- Release dates: 18 November 1958 (London, UK); June 1959 (USA)
- Running time: 84 minutes
- Country: United Kingdom
- Language: English
- Budget: £300,000

Floods of Fear is a 1958 British thriller film directed by Charles Crichton and starring Howard Keel, Anne Heywood and Harry H. Corbett.

== Plot ==
During a flood, prison convict Donovan escapes while helping build a barrier for an impending flood. He gets swept away in the waters, along with his prison guard, Sharkey, and a fellow prisoner, Peebles. They wash up at a farm house of Dr Mathews, who is away helping victims of the flood.

The trio are alone until Dr Mathews' daughter Anne arrives. Conflict ensues which results in Donovan leaving with Anne and Peebles fleeing Sharkey.

Donovan and Anne fall in love. He reveals that he was framed for murdering the wife of his former business partner, Jack Murphy, and is seeking revenge against Murphy.

== Cast ==
- Howard Keel as Donovan
- Anne Heywood as Elizabeth Matthews
- Cyril Cusack as Peebles
- Harry H. Corbett as Sharkey
- John Crawford as Jack Murphy
- Eddie Byrne as Sheriff
- John Phillips as Dr. Matthews
- Mark Baker as watchman
- James Dyrenforth as mayor
- Jack Lester as businessman
- Peter Madden as banker
- Guy Kingsley Poynter as deputy sheriff
- Gordon Tanner as Lt. Colonel
- Robert Mackenzie as police captain
- Vivian Matalon as farmer
- Gordon Sterne as farmer
- Bill Edwards as 1st deputy
- Graydon Gould as 2nd deputy
- Kevin Scott as 3rd deputy
- Ed Devereaux as sergeant

== Production ==
The film was made at a time when the Rank Organisation starred a lot of non-English actors in their films with a view to appealing to the international market.

The movie was based on a novel. Charles Crichton, the director, said he had to make the film "because I wanted money". He claimed the film "had a writer who was so awful that the producer said you take half the book... and I'll take the other half, you write that half, I'll write this half. And we only had a little time to do it. So I wrote my half and asked him where was his half and he said I haven't started yet, you better go on actually." Crichton had to rewrite the whole movie. "And it just wasn't a subject which I would have chosen," he said.

The movie was called The Floods of Fear but this was shortened to Floods of Fear. Filming started in London on 23 April 1958.

Howard Keel recalled the filming in his autobiography Only Make Believe: My Life in Show Business: "All the flood scenes were filmed on one of the large stages at Pinewood Studios. The water had to be both dirty and cold, and it was. They couldn't heat it for fear it might get rancid. That was another tough picture. Anne Heywood never once protested about the water. [Charles] Crichton, who had a great sense of humor, had directed some very funny pictures. Cyril Cusack and I were good friends. We had a little contest over Anne. He was a real cutie, as well as a hell of an actor, but I won out."

Crichton said he was "not proud of the picture" but was proud of the fact "that it looks like the Mississippi in flood and it was all shot in the studio at Pinewood, or near all. Technically I think it was quite an achievement actually."

== Reception ==
=== Critical ===
The Monthly Film Bulletin wrote: "Repetitive and violent – at least two thirds of this film are taken up with fights and attempted rape – Floods of Fear is a blood-and-guts melodrama on the starkest and toughest lines. Characters are drawn with bold, uncompromising strokes and none of the actors is required to give more than a sketch of a performance. Audiences who can become involved in the story may find it exciting; for those who are not prepared to believe in the reality of what is happening it may carry less conviction."

Variety called the film: "one of Britain's most determined Attempts to woo the U.S. market. Not only does it have Howard Keel as its male star, but the meller is unabashedly set in the U.S. The film has a novel setting, but an old idea, and corny dialog doesn't help the characters to develop overmuch. However, there is some sound acting and the production quality is tops. It adds up to reasonable entertainment, but it is one of those annoying pix that should – and could – have been much better. It is questionable whether its marquee value is sufficiently strong to lure Yank patrons".

Filmink called it "extremely well done technically, and quite a good little thriller from Charles Crichton, it's just... what's the point? Why make a film set in America about Americans where your imported American star is someone known for musical comedies rather than action (Howard Keel)? This was not a mistake that other British studios made – like, say, Warwick Pictures who routinely imported American stars, but ones who specialised in action (eg Alan Ladd, Victor Mature) and usually gave their stories a specifically British slant. Rank was not good enough to tackle Hollywood head on."

TV Guide wrote, "Heywood is a joy to watch as she stands up to the impending aquatic doom."

The Radio Times wrote, "well performed by an able cast Dallas star Howard Keel, Steptoe and Son's Harry H Corbett, Cyril Cusack and, in particular, damsel in distress Anne Heywood this is typical, and unremarkable, British 1950s B-movie fare."

=== Box office ===
The film was not a financial success.

In November 1958 Variety reported in London the film was performing "well below hopes."

In June 1959 Variety reported in Denver the film earned "sad $3,000 and pulled after 5 days".
