= Tennessee Champ =

1954 film by Fred M. Wilcox

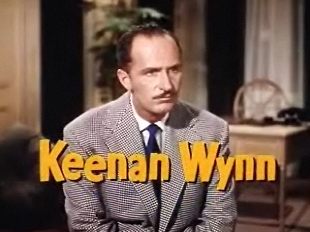
- Keenan Wynn from the trailer
- Directed by: Fred M. Wilcox
- Screenplay by: Art Cohn
- Based on: "The Lord in His Corner"; 1940 story in Collier's by Eustace Cockrell
- Produced by: Sol Baer Fielding
- Starring: Shelley Winters; Keenan Wynn; Dewey Martin
- Cinematography: George J. Folsey
- Edited by: Ben Lewis
- Music by: Conrad Salinger
- Production company: Metro-Goldwyn-Mayer
- Distributed by: Loew's, Inc.
- Release date: February 25, 1954
- Running time: 73 minutes
- Country: United States
- Language: English
- Budget: $548,000
- Box office: $769,000

Tennessee Champ is a 1954 American drama film with strong Christian overtones directed by Fred M. Wilcox and starring Shelley Winters, Keenan Wynn, Dewey Martin, and Charles Bronson

Mounted as a title to fill out double and triple bills (a B-movie), Tennessee Champ was one of several films Metro-Goldwyn-Mayer shot in its pet process of Ansco Color, a ruddy-looking process employed on the same year's Brigadoon.

The film marked a return to Hollywood for star Shelley Winters, who hadn't appeared in a film in almost two years because of her marriage to Vittorio Gassman (which ended in June 1954) and the birth of their child, Vittoria. The lull came just as she seemed to be on an upswing after roles in Winchester '73 (1950), Phone Call from a Stranger (1952), and her breakthrough tragic performance in A Place in the Sun (1951).

== Plot ==
Sarah Wurble's husband Willy is the larceny-inclined manager of an illiterate, and very religious boxer from Tennessee named Danny. Gifted with a powerful punch and a nickname that gives the film its title, Danny mistakenly believes he killed a man defending himself in a street brawl, and goes on the lam as a prizefighter.

His Christian convictions turn out to be both a source of inspiration and, ultimately, conflict when Willy urges him to throw a fight (while mistakenly fearing Willy will turn him in on the murder charge if he doesn't). Credulity flies out of the window when Danny discovers the man he is to take on in the fixed fight is actually the man he thought he killed, Sixty Jubel, The "Biloxi Blockbuster." Danny's example of unwavering faith causes Willy to rethink his sinful ways.

== Cast ==
- Shelley Winters as Sarah
- Keenan Wynn as Willy
- Dewey Martin as Danny
- Earl Holliman as Happy
- Dave O'Brien as Luke MacWade
- Charles Bronson as Sixty
- Yvette Dugay as Blossom
- Frank Richards as J.B. Backett
- Jack Kruschen as Andrews

== Reception ==
According to MGM records the film earned $555,000 in the US and Canada and $214,000 elsewhere, making a loss to the studio of $189,000.

== See also ==
- List of boxing films
