= Ward Hawkins =

American novelist

Ward Hawkins (29 December 1912 – 22 December 1990) was an American author, who wrote from the 1940s through the 1980s. His later works seem to have been science fiction, but earlier he wrote serial stories for the Saturday Evening Post in the 1940s and 1950s. He often wrote with his brother John Hawkins, and the University of Oregon has a collection of their manuscripts. In the 1960s, the brothers were writing for television, notably as staff writers for Bonanza, and in the 1970s, John Hawkins was a producer and writer for Little House on the Prairie, while Ward was Story Editor and also contributed many teleplays for the program.

== Filmography ==
=== Films ===
Year	Film	Credit	Notes
1944	Secret Command	Story By	Co-Wrote Story with "John Hawkins"
1954	Crime Wave	Story By	Co-Wrote Story with "John Hawkins"
1956	The Killer Is Loose	Story By	Co-Wrote Story with "John Hawkins"
1957	The Shadow on the Window	Story By	Co-Wrote Story with "John Hawkins"
1958	Floods of Fear	Story By	Co-Wrote Story with "John Hawkins"
1965	The Final Hour	Story By	

=== Television ===
Year	TV Series	Credit	Notes
1952	Chevron Theatre	Writer	2 Episodes
1952–56	Studio One	Writer	2 Episodes
1955	Fireside Theatre	Writer	1 Episode
1955	Celebrity Playhouse	Writer	1 Episode
1956	Kraft Television Theatre	Writer	1 Episode
1956–58	General Electric Theater	Writer	2 Episodes
1957	Schlitz Playhouse of Stars	Writer	1 Episode
1957	Climax!	Writer	1 Episode
1957–58	NBC Matinee Theater	Writer	2 Episodes
1958	Suspicion	Writer	1 Episode
1959	77 Sunset Strip	Writer	1 Episode
1959	Bourbon Street Beat	Writer	1 Episode
1960	M Squad	Writer	1 Episode
1960	Stagecoach West	Writer	1 Episode
1960	The Best of the Post	Writer	1 Episode
1961	Shannon	Writer	1 Episode
1961	Manhunt	Writer	1 Episode
1961–73	Bonanza	Writer, Story Editor	40 Episodes
1962	Alcoa Theatre	Writer	3 Episodes
1962–65	Rawhide	Writer	2 Episodes
1962–67	The Virginian	Writer	7 Episodes
1963	Kraft Mystery Theatre	Writer	1 Episode
1965	Burke's Law	Writer	1 Episode
1965	Convoy	Writer	1 Episode
1965	Daniel Boone	Writer	1 Episode
1965–67	Voyage To The Bottom Of The Sea	Writer	4 Episodes
1966	Tarzan	Writer	1 Episode
1967–68	The High Chaparral	Writer, Story Editor, Script Consultant	19 Episodes
1974	The Cowboys	Writer	2 Episodes
1974–75	Little House on the Prairie	Writer, Story Editor	13 Episodes

== Books ==
- Pilebuck, 1943.
- Floods of Fear, 1956 (Filmed in 1959)
- A Girl, a Man, and a River by John Hawkins and Ward Hawkins, paperback 1957
- Violent City by John and Ward Hawkins, Red Badge Mystery, 1957
- Kings Will Be Tyrants, 1959, paperback 1960
- The Damnation of John Doyle Lee, 1982
- Sword of Fire, 1985
- Red Flame Burning, 1985
- Blaze of Wrath, 1986
- Torch of Fear, 1987
