= The Way West =

1949 novel by A. B. Guthrie, Jr.

The Way West (novel)
- First edition
- Author: A. B. Guthrie, Jr.
- Language: English
- Genre: Western fiction
- Publisher: William Sloane Associates
- Publication date: 1949
- Publication place: United States
- Media type: Print (Hardback & Paperback)
- Pages: 340
- Preceded by: The Big Sky
- Followed by: These Thousand Hills

The Way West is a 1949 western novel by A. B. Guthrie, Jr. The book won the Pulitzer Prize for Fiction in 1950 and became the basis for a film starring Kirk Douglas, Robert Mitchum, and Richard Widmark.

The novel is one in the sequence of six by A. B. Guthrie, Jr. dealing with the Oregon Trail and the development of Montana from 1830, the time of the mountain men, to "the cattle empire of the 1880s to the near present". The publication sequence started with The Big Sky, followed by The Way West, These Thousand Hills, Arfive (1971), The Last Valley (1975), and Fair Land, Fair Land.

The first three books of the six in chronological story sequence (but not in the sequence of publishing) — The Big Sky, The Way West, and Fair Land, Fair Land — are in themselves a complete trilogy, starting in 1830 with Boone Caudill leaving Kentucky to become a mountain man and ending with the death of Caudill and later the death of Dick Summers in the 1870s.

== Plot introduction ==
Former senator William Tadlock leads a wagon train along the Oregon Trail from Missouri with the help of hired guide Dick Summers. After several accidents which cost settlers' lives, a mutiny of sorts develops and his position is overtaken by Lije Evans. Soon, different factions develop amongst the people of the train as they try to survive their trek to Oregon.

== Release details ==
- 1949, US, W. Sloane (ISBN NA), Pub date ? ? 1949, hardback (First edition)
- 2002, US, Mariner Books (ISBN 0-618-15462-0), Pub date ? January 2002, paperback
