= Jubel beer =

British fruit lager brand

Jubel
- Location: London, England
- Opened: 2017
- Owner: Jubel Ltd
- Website: Official website

Active beers
Name	Type
Peach	Fruit lager
Mango	Fruit lager
Lime	Fruit lager
Grapefruit	Fruit lager
Blood orange	Fruit lager
Lemon	Fruit lager

Jubel (stylised JUBEL) is a British brewing company and fruit lager brand based in London, England. It produces a range of 4% ABV lagers flavoured with fruit, marketed as combining the refreshment of a fruit cider with the drinkability of a lager.

The brand was developed by Jesse Wilson and Tom Jordan in 2017 and launched nationally in 2018 after the founders were inspired by a peach-topped lager drunk on a ski trip in the French Alps. Jubel’s fruit lagers are stocked by major UK supermarkets and poured on draught in pubs nationwide, and have been cited as part of a wider growth in fruit-flavoured beer among younger drinkers.

== History ==
Wilson has said the idea for Jubel originated during a university ski trip in 2015, when he tried bière pêche, a lager topped with peach syrup, at the La Folie Douce bar in Val Thorens in the French Alps and saw potential for a drink positioned between beer and cider. After graduating from the University of Exeter and working in a corporate role, he began developing recipes with a contract brewer in Cornwall, refining a peach-flavoured lager over several trial batches. Early batches were tested at festivals, where the beer reportedly sold out, encouraging Wilson to quit his job to pursue the brand full-time. Jubel was formally created by Wilson and fellow University of Exeter alumnus Tom Jordan in 2017, initially brewing its peach-flavoured "Alpine" lager as a contract brew in Cornwall. The brand’s name and visual identity drew on après-ski culture, taking its name from a dance track.

In 2018 Jubel secured its first large supermarket listing with Sainsbury's, initially in around 600 stores, and expanded its pub distribution in the south-west of England. The company subsequently gained listings with Tesco, Waitrose and Ocado, and its beers were reported in 2025 to be on draught in nearly 1,000 pubs nationwide.

In 2019 C&C Group acquired a minority stake in Jubel to support its expansion, while the company remained an independent brand. Jubel raised a further £2.7 million in 2022 from investors including C&C.

By 2025, Jubel’s beers were available in around 1,500 pubs, with the company expecting sales of around £26–27 million.

== Products ==
Jubel specialises in 4% ABV lagers flavoured with fruit, described as "lager cut with fruit" and positioned as a distinct fruit-lager style.

The brand’s flagship beer is a peach-flavoured lager, originally marketed as Alpine Peach. The core range has expanded to include grapefruit (Coast), blood orange and lemon variants, sold in cans and on draught. All of their beers are gluten free, meeting Coeliac UK requirements, and are suitable for vegans. Some early flavours, including an elderflower lager, have been released as limited editions or rotated out of the permanent range.

In May 2025, The Grocer reported that Jubel would transition its barley supply to grain grown using regenerative agriculture practices through a partnership with Wildfarmed, with the move expected to deliver emissions reductions of more than 50% for the brand’s barley-related footprint.

== See also ==
- Fruit beer
- Beer in England
- C&C Group
