= Smith Hempstone =

American diplomat

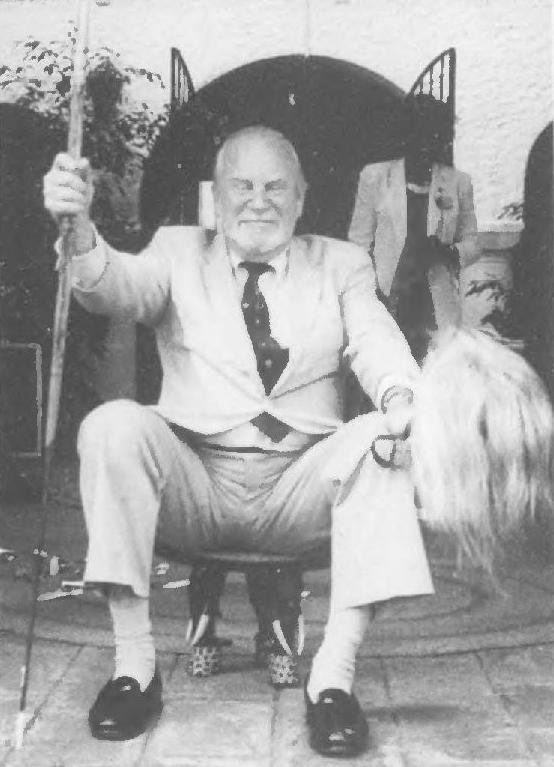
- Hempstone in Kenya in March 1993
- Born: February 1, 1929; Washington, D.C., U.S.
- Died: November 19, 2006 (aged 77); Suburban Hospital; Bethesda, Maryland, U.S.
- Education: George Washington University, 1946-47; University of the South, B.A., 1950; Harvard University, graduate study, 1964-65
- Alma mater: University of the South
- Occupations: Journalist and U.S. diplomat
- Political party: Republican Party (1958-1968); Independent(1968-2006)
- Board member of: Trustee, University of the South, 1975–1978 governor, Institute of Current World Affairs, 1975–1978.
- Spouse(s): Kathaleen Fishback "Kitty", January 30, 1954 - February 20, 2021 –his death
- Children: daughter, Katherine Hope Hempstone of Baltimore, and two grandsons and one granddaughter
- Parent(s): Smith (a naval officer) and Elizabeth (Noyes) Hempstone
- Awards: Sigma Delta Chi Award for distinguished service in journalism (foreign correspondence), 1960; Nieman Fellow, 1964–1965; Overseas Press Club citations for excellence in foreign correspondence, 1968, 1974; Honorary doctorate of letters from University of the South, 1968.

Smith Hempstone (February 1, 1929 – November 19, 2006) was a journalist, author, and the United States ambassador to Kenya from 1989 to 1993. He was a vocal proponent of democracy, advocating free elections for Kenya.

== Early life and education ==
Hempstone was born February 1, 1929, Washington, D.C. He attended George Washington University, and later transferred to the University of the South in Sewanee, Tennessee, where he graduated.

== Career ==
From 1949 to 1952, he was a U.S. Marine in the Korean War, and left the Marines with the rank of captain.

He then did radio rewrite for the Associated Press in Charlotte, North Carolina in 1952. He was a reporter for the Louisville Times in Louisville, Kentucky in 1953, a rewrite editor at National Geographic in Washington, D.C. in 1954, and then a reporter at The Washington Star from 1955 to 1956. He was a fellow of the Institute of Current World Affairs in Africa from 1956 to 1960.

=== Foreign correspondent ===
In 1961, Hempstone became a foreign correspondent for the Chicago Daily News in Africa, where he served until 1964, and then in Latin America in 1965. In 1966, he joined The Washington Star as foreign correspondent in Latin America. From 1966 to 1969, he was The Star's correspondent in Europe. He was associate editor and editorial page director of The Star from 1970 to 1975. In 1975, following a disagreement with The Star's new owner Joe L. Allbritton, he left the newspaper. Beginning in 1975, he authored a syndicated twice-weekly column, "Our Times", which carried in over 90 newspapers.

=== The Washington Times ===
In 1982, Hempstone was named executive editor of the newly founded The Washington Times and, following the resignation of editor and publisher James R. Whelan in 1984, briefly served as editor of the paper before being replaced by Arnaud de Borchgrave.

=== U.S. ambassador to Kenya ===
In 1989, President George H. W. Bush appointed Hempstone ambassador to Kenya at a time when the United States was beginning to pressure African countries to democratize and improve human rights. Hempstone worked toward these goals by advocating for multiparty elections in Kenya in 1991, nine years after Kenyan president Daniel arap Moi banned all parties except his own. The Moi administration derided him, saying he failed to understand that strong, unified government was necessary to keep Kenya's tribal groups from dividing the nation.

Hempstone aided dissidents and befriended opponents of the Moi administration, causing the African press to describe his style as "bulldozer diplomacy." The Kenyan government isolated him and, according to Hempstone's book Rogue Ambassador: An African Memoir, twice attempted to kill him. Multi-party elections were ultimately held in Kenya in 1992, which were won by Moi with 36 percent of the vote.

In 2001, former Kenyan government minister Nicholas Biwott successfully sued Hempstone in High Court Civil Suit Case No. 1273 in Kenya for suggesting in his autobiography that Biwott had been involved in the murder Robert Ouko, Kenya's minister of foreign affairs, in February 1990. Hempstone did not defend himself in the suit.

== Death ==
On November 19, 2006, Hempstone died from complications of diabetes in Suburban Hospital in Bethesda, Maryland.

== Writings ==
- Letters from Africa to the Institute of Current World Affairs, New York (1956)
- Africa, Angry Young Giant (1961)
- Africa: Angry Young Giant, Praeger, 1961 (published in England as The New Africa, Faber, 1961)
- The New Africa (1961)
- Rebels, Mercenaries, and Dividends: The Katanga Story Praeger, (1962)
- Katanga Report, Faber, (1962)
- A Tract of Time (novel), Houghton, (1966)
- In the Midst of Lions (novel) (1968)
- India in Focus: Six Articles (1964)
- In the Midst of Lions (novel), Harper, (1968)
- Editor, Illustrated History of St. Albans School, Glastonbury Press, (1981)
- United States Foreign Policy and the China Problem by Morton A. Kaplan, Douglas MacArthur, Smith Hempstone (1982)
- Chosin Marine: An Autobiography by Bill Davis, James H. Webb, Smith Hempstone (1986)
- Rogue Ambassador: An African Memoir (1997)
- Contributor to Atlantic Monthly, Reader's Digest, Saturday Evening Post, U.S. News & World Report, and other magazines.

== Memberships ==
- American Society of News Editors
- Explorers Club

== Sources ==
- Douglas Martin (November 30, 2006). "Smith Hempstone, 77, Journalist Who Became Prominent Ambassador, Is Dead". New York Times. p. A27.

Diplomatic posts
Preceded by Elinor Greer Constable	United States Ambassador to Kenya; 1989–1993	Succeeded by Aurelia E. Brazeal
