= Dewey Martin (actor) =

American actor (1923–2018)

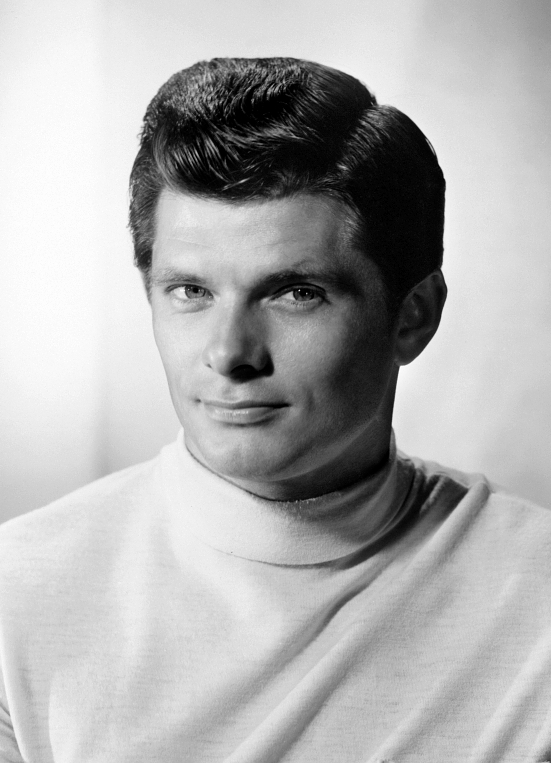
- Martin in 1952
- Born: December 8, 1923; Katemcy, Texas, U.S.
- Died: April 9, 2018 (aged 94); Los Angeles, California, U.S.
- Occupation: Actor
- Years active: 1948–1978
- Spouses: Mardie Havelhurst (m. 1952; div. 1955) Peggy Lee (m. 1956; div. 1958) Tiko Sheridan (m. 1970)
- Relatives: Ross Bass (first cousin)

Dewey Dallas Martin (December 8, 1923 – April 9, 2018) was an American film and television actor.

== Early life ==
Martin was born in Katemcy, Texas. As a teenager, he lived in Florence, Alabama.

Martin joined the United States Navy in 1940. In November 1942, he was one of a few enlisted sailors from Naval Air Technical Training Center Norman, Oklahoma, selected for pre-flight training with the opportunity to earn a commission as an officer and become a naval aviator. In April 1943, he was transferred to pre-flight training at the CAA War Training Service School in Natchitoches, Louisiana. At the time of his transfer, he was an Aviation Metalsmith 2nd Class and served as the Aviation Metalsmith School storekeeper. In November 1943, he was transferred to Navy-Preflight School in Athens, Georgia. In June 1944, he was assigned to Naval Air Station Pensacola, Florida, after completing primary flight training in Dallas, Texas. He served as a fighter pilot in the Pacific Theater of the war.

He served in The Battle of Midway as an F4F Wildcat pilot. After the Battle of Midway, he was shot down and picked up by American forces. He then was likely assigned to the USS Ticonderoga as an F6F Hellcat pilot. In early 1945, he was forced to ditch because the Ticonderoga was damaged but this time he was captured by Japanese Forces and became a Prisoner of War. He was not released until Japan surrendered; he was only 78 pounds when he was released.

== Acting career ==
His film debut was an uncredited part in Knock on Any Door (1949), starring Humphrey Bogart. He also appeared in The Thing from Another World (1951), co-starred with Kirk Douglas in The Big Sky (1952), and reuniting again with Humphrey Bogart as his younger, escaped convict brother in The Desperate Hours. Martin also played a lead role in Land of the Pharaohs (1955), and was featured opposite Dean Martin in Dean’s first post-Martin and Lewis film—Ten Thousand Bedrooms (1957)—but did not become a full-fledged star.

Martin worked extensively in television as well, including The Twilight Zone episode "I Shot an Arrow Into the Air" (1960) and The Outer Limits episode "The Premonition" (1965), co-written by Ib Melchior. Starting in 1960 he starred as Daniel Boone in four episodes of Walt Disney Presents.

== Personal life ==
Martin married Mardie Havelhurst from Portland, Oregon, on February 15, 1952. They were divorced in 1955. He was later married to singer Peggy Lee for two years; the marriage ended in divorce.

His first cousin was Ross Bass, a senator from Tennessee.

In the 1970s, he met and married Tiko Sheridan. Through his stepsons, John and Kevin Sheridan, he had one grandson and two granddaughters.

== Death ==
Martin step-son John Sheridan confirmed that Dewey Martin died on April 9, 2018; no cause of death was officially released. His ashes were scattered at sea.

== Complete filmography ==
- Knock on Any Door (1949) - Butch (uncredited)
- Battleground (1949) - G.I. Straggler (uncredited)
- The Golden Gloves Story (1950) - Nick Martel
- Kansas Raiders (1950) - James Younger
- The Thing from Another World (1951) - Crew Chief Bob
- Flame of Araby (1951) - Yak
- The Big Sky (1952) - Boone Caudill
- Tennessee Champ (1954) - Daniel Norson
- Prisoner of War (1954) - Jesse Treadman
- Men of the Fighting Lady (1954) - Ensign Kenneth Schechter
- Land of the Pharaohs (1955) - Senta, Vashtar's Son
- The Desperate Hours (1955) - Hal Griffin
- Meet Me in Las Vegas (1956) - Dewey Martin (uncredited)
- The Proud and Profane (1956) - Eddie Wodcik
- Ten Thousand Bedrooms (1957) - Mike Clark Jr.
- The Longest Day (1962) - Private Wilder (scenes deleted)
- Savage Sam (1963) - Lester White
- Flight to Fury (1964) - Joe Gaines
- Cordillera (1964) (Tagalog version of Flight to Fury)
- Assault on the Wayne (1971 TV movie) - Skip Langley
- Seven Alone (1974) - Henry Sager

== Partial television roles ==
- Cavalry Patrol pilot episode (1956) - Lt. Johnny Reardon
- Zane Gray Theatre episode Man of Fear (1958) – Doc Holliday
- The Twilight Zone episode "I Shot an Arrow Into the Air" (1960) - Corey
- Walt Disney Presents - "Daniel Boone" mini-series (1960-1961) - Daniel Boone
- Man on the Beach pilot (1961) - Detective
- The Outer Limits episode "The Premonition" (1965) - Jim Darcy
- Laramie episode "The Stranger" (1963) – Vanton Maddox
- Wheeler and Murdoch pilot (1972) - Travanty
- Mission Impossible episode: "Leona" (1972) - Mike Clark Jr.
