= Jubilee Class =

Jubilee Class may refer to:

- LNWR Jubilee Class, 4-4-0 steam locomotives built between 1897 and 1900
- LMS Jubilee Class, 4-6-0 steam locomotives built between 1934 and 1936
- Jubilee-class ocean liner, class of five ocean liners built for the White Star Line for their Australian service between 1899 and 1901
