= Jubilee (Maverick City Music song) =

2021 song by Maverick City Music

Song by Maverick City Music featuring Naomi Raine and Bryan & Katie Torwalt

from the EP Jubilee
- Released: February 26, 2021
- Recorded: 2020
- Venue: 1971 Sounds, Atlanta, Georgia, U.S.
- Genre: Contemporary worship music; contemporary gospel
- Length: 8:51
- Label: Tribl
- Songwriters: Naomi Raine; Bryan Torwalt; Katie Torwalt
- Producers: Jonathan Jay; Tony Brown

Music video
- "Jubilee" on YouTube

"Jubilee" is a song performed by American contemporary worship collective Maverick City Music featuring Naomi Raine and Bryan & Katie Torwalt. It was released by Tribl Records as a track on their similarly titled fourth solo extended play, Jubilee, on February 26, 2021. The song was written by Bryan Torwalt, Katie Torwalt, and Naomi Raine. Jonathan Jay and Tony Brown produced the song.

"Jubilee" debuted at No. 34 on the US Hot Christian Songs chart, and No. 12 on the Hot Gospel Songs chart.

== Background ==
On February 22, 2021, Maverick City Music released the music video for "Jubilee" featuring Naomi Raine and Bryan & Katie Torwalt on YouTube. Maverick City Music also announced that Jubilee will be released on Tribl App exclusively on February 24, 2021, with the release to other streaming platforms being slated for February 26, 2021.

Naomi Raine shared the story behind the song in an interview with Worship Musician Magazine. Raine acknowledged that the song was born from the imagery of mercy as the forgiveness of all debts, the release of prisoners and slaves and the favor of God flowing at the end of a 49-year-long cycle. Raine further added that she had a conversation with the Torwalts about the racial situation in the United States and they thought they should write a song that captures the Father's heart, describing "Jubilee" as "a song of hope."

== Composition ==
"Jubilee" is composed in the key of F♯ with a tempo of 65 beats per minute and a musical time signature of 4/4.

== Commercial performance ==
"Jubilee" debuted at No. 34 on the US Hot Christian Songs, and No. 12 on the Hot Gospel Songs charts dated March 13, 2021.

== Music video ==
Tribl released the official music video of "Jubilee" with Naomi Raine and Bryan & Katie Torwalt leading the song at 1971 Sounds studio in Atlanta, Georgia, through their YouTube channel on February 22, 2021.

== Charts ==
Weekly chart performance for "Jubilee"
Chart (2021)	Peak position
US Hot Christian Songs (Billboard)	34
US Gospel Songs (Billboard)	12
