= Jubilee (Walker novel) =

1966 novel by Margaret Walker

- First edition
- Author: Margaret Walker
- Cover artist: William Hoffman
- Language: English
- Genre: Historical novel
- Publisher: Houghton Mifflin
- Publication date: 1966
- Publication place: United States
- Media type: Print (hardcover)
- Pages: 536 pages

Jubilee (1966) is a historical novel written by Margaret Walker, which focuses on the story of a biracial slave during the American Civil War. It is set in Georgia and later in various parts of Alabama in the mid-19th century before, during, and after the Civil War.

== Plot summary ==
Jubilee is the semi-fictional story of Vyry Brown, based on the life of author Margaret Walker's great-grandmother, Margaret Duggans Ware Brown. Vyry Brown is a mixed-race slave—the unacknowledged daughter of her master—who is born on the Dutton plantation in Georgia. The novel follows her experiences from early childhood to adult life.

The story of Vyry's life in the novel spans three major periods of American history: Slavery, the Civil War, and Reconstruction.

== Characters ==
- Sis Hetta—Vyry's mother. A slave who is regularly raped by slave owner John Dutton, she dies in the novel's opening chapter at the age of 29, when Vyry is a very small child; she has 15 children.
- Caline, May Liza, and Lucy—servants in the big house who work with Aunt Sally and Vyry. Lucy is Vyry's older half sister, by Hetta's slave husband. After being beaten and branded for running away, Lucy succeeds in escaping to freedom.
- John Morris Dutton—"Marse" or "Marster John," owner of the Dutton Plantation. His slave mistress, Sis Hetta, is Vyry's mother. He never recognizes Vyry as his offspring and refuses to set her free by letting her marry a freedman, instead promising to set her free in his will – a promise that never materializes. Later embarks on a political career, and dies from injuries in carriage accident.
- Miss Salina—"Big Missy", the wife of Marse John and mother of his two legitimate children. She is cruel to the slaves, particularly to Vyry, whose obvious descendance from her husband is an affront to herself and her daughter Lillian, born at the same time as Vyry.
- Vyry—Elvira Dutton, the protagonist of the novel. She is a dynamic main character. Vyry is the daughter of Sis Hetta, who dies as the novel opens, and her master, John Dutton. She is a slave, but her skin is so fair she can "pass" as white. She is a solemn, generous woman who in the course of her life acquires many skills that will be essential to her survival, while rendering service to others: she is an herborist, a cook, a seamstress and a midwife.
- Aunt Sally—a house slave on the Dutton Plantation. She is the cook and teaches Vyry her recipes. She acts as a mother to Vyry.
- Grandpa Tom—a black slave who works on the Dutton Plantation. One day he refuses to let Grimes use one of Dutton's finest horses for field work, and is whipped to death by the irate overseer.
- Randall Ware—a literate black freedman and a blacksmith. Despite being born free, his liberty is legally conditional on the support of a white "guardian". He promises to marry Vyry and buy her freedom, but Marse John won't permit it. At the onset of the Civil War he joins the Union troops, and the couple are separated.
- Jim, Minna, and Harry—Vyry's children.
- Miss Lillian—"the little Missy", the daughter of Marse John and Salina. She is about the same age as Vyry, her unacknowledged half sister, whom she strongly resembles. She and Vyry play together when they are little, but Missy Salina eventually separates them when neighbors remark on their resemblance. Unlike her mother, she is not cruel but gullible and easily manipulated. She has two children with Kevin, named Robert and Susan.
- Ed Grimes—the overseer on the Dutton Plantation. A white man of poor origin, he is little higher than the slaves on the social ladder, but works them and punishes them mercilessly, killing Grandpa Tom. When the plantation falls into ruin during the war, he joins the Confederate Army and later seems to be among the Klansmen who drive Randall Ware from his smithy.
- Innis Brown—a slave freed by the war. He meets Vyry at the war's end, protects her from an attacker, and marries her legally as Randall Ware is not present. He is a caring husband, but ultimately alienates his stepson Jim by overworking him.
- John Dutton Jr.—son of John Dutton and Miss Salina. He serves in the Confederate Army, gets shot during the war and dies at home.
- Brother Ezekiel—"Brother Zeke", a black preacher who helps slaves escape in the underground railroad. A literate man, he helps Vyry and Randall Ware send letters to each other and marries the two.
- Kevin McDougall—Miss Lillian's husband and a teacher. Unlike his brother-in-law John, he hates soldiers, war, and the idea of violence, and is sympathetic towards slaves and abolition. He is socially pressured into joining the Confederate military and is killed.
- Fanny Crenshaw—John Dutton Jr.'s childhood sweetheart. She takes care of him during his final convalescence, regretting that they were never able to marry.

== Setting (location) ==
The historic novel is set in parts of Georgia and Alabama, such as:

- Terrell County, Georgia—where Vyry is born
- Lee County, Georgia—where the Dutton Plantation is
- Troy, Alabama—where the wagon breaks down and Vyry and Innis settle down and befriend the Jacobsons; Vyry and Innis' house is burned down by the Ku Klux Klan
- Luverne, Alabama—a very poor town that Vyry and Innis passed through
- Greenville, Alabama—where Vyry and Innis live permanently, and Vyry sells goods in the marketplace
- Selma, Alabama—where Randall Ware says he will take Jim to school

== Setting (time) ==
1835–1870

== Historical events (chronological order) ==
Before the Civil War, the Bible was quoted to justify slavery as a natural and righteous state. Slaves meanwhile identified with the Old Testament Hebrew slaves who were liberated by Moses. Jubilee follows the course of the Civil War and Reconstruction, where violence by the Ku Klux Klan was unfortunately common. Specific events from this historical novel (in chronological order) include:

1. 1857: The South was victorious in the Dred Scott case.
2. March 4, 1861: Abraham Lincoln was inaugurated the sixteenth president of the United States. (184)
3. April 1861: Guns of Charleston, South Carolina, fired on the Federal flag at Fort Sumter. President Lincoln declared the seceded states of the Confederacy to be in a state of rebellion which must be put down if the Union was to be preserved. (195)
4. July 1861: The capital of the Confederacy was moved from Montgomery to Richmond. (201)
5. 1862: The South was winning the war. (208) (Despite Union victories at the battles of Pea Ridge and Shiloh)
6. July 18, 1862: 'Fighting Joe' Wheeler was named commander of the cavalry of the Army of Tennessee by General Braxton Bragg. (213)
7. Summer of 1863: Battle of Gettysburg with General Robert E. Lee and his Army of Northern Virginia, which "failed in their second attempt to invade northern territory" (214) (Union Victory)
8. July 1863: Battle of Vicksburg with General Ulysses S. Grant. (Union victory)
9. 1863: Marked a turning of the tide in favor of the Union forces (245); word spread that Abraham Lincoln would issue an proclamation to free slaves in Union-held territories. Thousands of slaves fled plantations. The South saw a wholesale disappearance of blacks seeking the "protection of the Union armies" (246). Abraham Lincoln was seen by blacks as a new Moses. The war also evinced technological progress: Union soldiers now fought with repeating rifles and longer projectiles, while the navy began to use iron-clad gunboats instead of wooden sail ships.
10. February 17, 1864: To fight currency depreciation, the Confederate Congress passed Treasury Secretary Christopher Memminger's plan requiring citizens to turn in their paper currency and buy long-term war bonds. The measure failed to prevent the collapse of Confederate credit.
11. August 7, 1864: End of the naval Battle of Mobile Bay, a Union victory.
12. January 1, 1865: Emancipation Proclamation repeated in Georgia (Vyry and family are free).
13. 1868: The Ku Klux Klan rode for three days and nights during the national elections, resulting in terrible violence.

== Events in Vyry's life (chronological order) ==
1. Sis Hetta dies from childbirth
2. Vyry becomes a slave at a toddler age
3. Granny Ticey and Mammy Sukey die
4. Miss Salina hangs Vyry by her thumbs in the closet for breaking one of her china dishes
5. Brother Zeke baptizes Vyry as she now enters womanhood
6. Grandpa Tom is killed by Grimes for not giving Grimes a fine horse (Grandpa Tom is following Marse John's Orders)
7. Aunt Sally is sold as Miss Salina does not like her; Salina and John Dutton go through cooks trying to find a cook who can cook as well as Aunt Sally. John Dutton considers selling Aunt Sally a mistake until Vyry is discovered as a cook whose food is identical to that of Aunt Sally's. Vyry is put into the Big House and works as a cook.
8. Vyry meets Randall Ware as she is supposed to give him food. He immediately takes interest in Vyry; whereas Vyry only develops love for him after he promises her freedom
9. Lucy badtalks Miss Salina during a party, gets beaten, runs away, is caught, and gets branded
10. Fourth of July celebration- priests rant about slaves listening to their masters
11. Lucy runs away a second time and manages to escape from the Dutton Plantation
12. Vyry asks John Dutton if she can marry Randall Ware. Knowing how precious of a cook Vyry is, John Dutton decides that the two may get married only after his death (however it doesn't happen)
13. John Dutton dies
14. John Dutton Jr. dies
15. Kevin dies
16. Salina dies
17. Vyry and kids are free after a man comes to emancipate the slaves
18. Vyry meets Innis Brown as he tries to protect her and Miss Lillian from a robber
19. Vyry and Innis move to Alabama as they get married
20. Vyry and Innis get flooded out of their house by the Chattahoochee River and lose most of their belongings
21. Vyry and Innis sign the contract for another house, stating that they must pay off the house with crops made on the land, however the land has bad soil. Vyry and Innis cannot pay off the house or make a living
22. Vyry and Innis leave to Troy, Pike County
23. Vyry and Innis' house is burned down by KKK
24. Vyry and Innis travel to Luvenere
25. Vyry and Innis get land in Butler County near Greenville
26. Vyry visits Ms. Lucy and Ms. Lillian in Georgia
27. Vyry and Innis move into their permanent house
28. Vyry earns a living by selling goods in a nearby town
29. Vyry helps a woman give birth as Vyry hears the woman's screams while selling her goods in the town. The woman does not take Vyry as a black woman, for Vyry's skin is fair. Vyry helps to settle racial confusion or stereotypes the woman and her husband have. The woman and her husband take note that Vyry is kind and gentle and feel comfortable around Vyry.
30. Woman and family help Vyry build her house
31. Innis Brown beats Jim
32. Randall Ware visits and takes Jim to school in the city
33. Vyry expects a baby with Innis Brown

== Court case ==
In 1978, Margaret Walker sued Alex Haley, claiming that his 1976 novel Roots: The Saga of an American Family had violated Jubilee's copyright by borrowing from her novel. The case was dismissed.

== Adaptation ==
Jubilee was adapted into a three-act opera by Ulysses Kay, to a libretto by Donald Dorr; it was commissioned by Opera/South and premiered in 1976.
