= The Big Sky (novel) =

1947 Western novel by A. B. Guthrie Jr.

- First edition cover
- Author: A. B. Guthrie Jr.
- Cover artist: Alan Haemer
- Language: English
- Genre: Western
- Publisher: William Sloane Associates
- Publication date: 1947
- Publication place: United States
- Media type: Print (hardback & paperback)
- Followed by: The Way West

The Big Sky is a 1947 Western novel by A. B. Guthrie Jr. It is the first of six novels in Guthrie's sequence dealing with the Oregon Trail and the development of Montana from 1830, the time of the mountain men, to "the cattle empire of the 1880s to the near present."

The first three books of the six in chronological story sequence (but not in the sequence of publishing) – The Big Sky, Fair Land, Fair Land, and The Way West – are in themselves a complete trilogy, starting in the 1830s and ending in the 1870s.

The Big Sky was one of the first to depict the Old West with reality instead of romanticism. Guthrie described the hardships and the dangers and wrote in the vernacular of the time. He said the theme of the novel is "that each man kills the thing he loves".

In 1961 the Montana tourism campaign used the title as their slogan "Big Sky Country". It was used on license plates until 2009 and in official highway maps and as a name for various things in Montana. It has become Montana's main, but unofficial, nickname.

== Plot ==
Boone Caudill is a young man who lives in Kentucky with his family as people are pushing further and further west in the Americas. (Boone is supposedly named after Daniel Boone, who is credited with finding Kentucky.) Boone's father is physically abusive to not only his mother, but also his brother and him. One night, his father begins to beat him after Boone had caused trouble in town, and Boone hits his father over the head with a stick from the wood pile. Knowing that his father is seriously injured, possibly even dead, he goes back to the house and steals his father's prize rifle. As a parting gift, his mother offers him a roast chicken they were going to have for supper. With that, Boone runs away.

After thinking back to his childhood, he remembers his maternal uncle Zeb Calloway. The uncle was a mountain man, frequently thought of as uncivilized by his mother and father. Boone decides this is the life for him and sets off for the West and the mountains. As he walks, he meets a man with a cart and mule named Jim Deakins, who admits to Boone that he has always wanted something more from life and decides that Boone has the right idea. As they arrive into the next city, Jim decides to sell his mule and wagon for some money to travel and join Boone. However, as they get into town, Boone's father has just arrived and is intent on getting his rifle back. Boone jumps in the nearby river to get away, as Jim shouts from the banks of the river for Boone to wait for him.

As Boone sets out again, he meets another traveler, Jonathan Bedwell. Bedwell gets Boone drunk and then steals his rifle, to Boone's horror. He continues to travel, now without the rifle, though intent on getting it back. However, he sees Bedwell outside of another town, and attacks him. The sheriff had been nearby and breaks them up. The sheriff takes them to court, and after a quick trial the more sophisticated Bedwell is given the rights to the rifle, as everyone believes it is his anyway. Boone is sentenced to spend time in the jail, but he refuses to admit that he did anything wrong so the sheriff flogs him in hopes of getting a confession.

Meanwhile, Jim Deakins is traveling up the same path that Boone had taken. After getting the story out of the locals, he pretends to merely be curious about the goings-on. As he gets the sheriff progressively drunker, he steals the keys to the jail and sets Boone free. They go back to the inn where everyone had been drinking. Boone steals a horse and they flee the area for St. Louis.

Boone and Deakins travel for a while before they get recruited onto a French keelboat traveling up the Missouri River. There the boys meet Dick Summers, the boat's hunter and guide, who becomes a role model for Boone in particular, whose explosive temper has gotten into more trouble than he's been able to completely avoid. On the boat, the captain has a Native American princess named Teal Eye. The captain and mate have strictly forbidden any of the crew to talk to her, as they believe it will help relations with the Blackfoot chief for them to bring him back his daughter and they don't want to bring back damaged goods. Boone sneaks looks at the girl, almost instantly falling in love with her. When they reach Blackfoot country, Teal Eye disappears one night. Soon after, the Blackfeet attack and destroy the keelboat and kill everyone on her except the three friends Caudill, Deakins, and Summers, who manage to escape.

A good portion of the novel involves Boone Caudill becoming a fur trapper and dealing with the hardships as he moves further from civilization. Dick Summers realizes that he is too old to continue the life of a mountain man and leaves Jim Deakins and Boone Caudill to return to his land in Missouri to farm.

Boone continues to be obsessed with Teal Eye, and eventually he is able to find her again. By that time large numbers of the Blackfeet have been killed by smallpox. With gifts Boone manages to convince Teal Eye's brother, now the chief since the death of their father, to let him have Teal Eye, who uses sign language to tell Boone that she loves him. Jim Deakins, Teal Eye and Boone live peacefully within the tribe, Boone finally feeling as if he's found a place to fit in. Teal Eye eventually gets pregnant, to Boone's joy. However, when the child is born, he is blind. He also has red hair, like Boone's closest friend Jim Deakins. Believing Teal Eye cheated on him, Boone is crushed. He proceeds to kill Jim Deakins and leave Teal Eye, fleeing back east.

When Boone arrives back in Kentucky, his mother notes that there have been red heads in their family. Boone cannot tolerate his confusion and the settled life and mores in Kentucky and, depending on one's point of view, either seduces or rapes a young neighbor girl, who despite her sobbing asks when they'll get married. That same night he flees west: "He didn't realize he was running until he saw [his dog] trotting to keep up."

Boone stops at Dick Summers's farm in Missouri. In a theme repeated throughout Guthrie's trilogy, Boone refers to the destruction of the pristine West the first whites had known: "It's all sp'iled, I reckon, Dick. The whole caboodle." Boone blurts out that he killed Jim Deakins: "This here hand done it. ... I kilt Jim." Rather than spend even that one night with Dick Summers, Boone Caudill flees out the door.

== Historical Background ==
Guthrie said that he used Osborne Russell's Journal of a trapper, or, Nine years in the Rocky Mountains, 1834-1843, and books by Francis Parkman as source material when he wrote this book.
