= John Hohenberg =

American journalist and academic

John Hohenberg (February 17, 1906 – August 6, 2000) was an American journalist and academic. During his journalism career from the 1920s to 1950s, Hohenberg primarily worked at the New York Evening Post and New York Journal-American. After gaining prominence as a foreign correspondent and early United Nations reporter, he began teaching at Columbia University in 1948, ultimately serving as a tenured full professor at the institution's Graduate School of Journalism from 1950 to 1974. From 1954 onward, he served concurrently as the first administrator of the Pulitzer Prizes, retaining this position for two additional years at the request of the Pulitzer Board after taking emeritus status. In 1976, he received a Pulitzer Prize Special Citation upon retiring from his administrative role.

== Early life and education ==
Hohenberg was born Jacob S. Hohenberg in a tenement on the Lower East Side of Manhattan. When he was one and a half, he and his family relocated to Seattle, where they remained throughout his childhood and adolescence. He attended the University of Washington as an engineering major from 1922 to 1924 before pursuing a journalistic career and returning to New York, where he received a B.Litt. from Columbia University's Journalism School (which then only conferred undergraduate degrees) in 1927. The following year, Hohenberg completed non-degree graduate studies at the University of Vienna on a Pulitzer Traveling Fellowship, presaging his later involvement with the awards program.

== Career ==
In 1923, Hohenberg worked at The Seattle Star after dropping out from the University of Washington. Following multiple brief positions at New York news publications after receiving his degree, Hohenberg was named assistant editor of the city department for the New York Evening Post in 1928. He remained in this position until he joined the New York Journal-American as a national political writer and second-string theater critic in 1933, a position he retained for nine years. Deferring an offer to return to the Post, Hohenberg enlisted in the United States Army during World War II, serving from 1943 to 1945. With limited need for officers late in the war, he was assigned to the Army Transportation Corps as a public relations specialist, attaining the rank of technician third grade. Following the war, Hohenberg returned to the Post (by now an influential liberal tabloid under the ownership of Dorothy Schiff) as a United Nations, Washington, D.C. and foreign correspondent from 1946 to 1950, greatly enhancing his public profile.

After inquiring about a position with the Journalism School, Hohenberg returned to Columbia as a part-time undergraduate journalism lecturer at the School of General Studies in 1948. In 1950, he left the Post and joined the faculty of the Journalism School as a tenured full professor. Beginning in 1954, he also served as the inaugural Pulitzer Prize administrator. Prior to the creation of this position, the program was jointly managed by the dean of the Journalism School and other officials at Columbia, including longtime provost Frank D. Fackenthal and his staff. Hohenberg held this joint appointment until 1974, when he stepped down from his professorship. In 1976, Hohenberg retired as administrator after overseeing the transition of the program's Advisory Board into an autonomous award-granting body (thereafter known as the Pulitzer Prize Board) in conjunction with chairman Joseph Pulitzer Jr. and Columbia president William J. McGill. That year, Hohenberg received a Pulitzer Prize Special Citation for his service.

While at Columbia, he also served as a consultant to the Secretary of the Air Force (1953–1963), a State Department American specialist lecturer in 10 Asian countries (1963–1964) and a discussion leader for the International Press Institute in New Delhi (1966). He was also affiliated with the East-West Center as a senior specialist (1967) and held a visiting professorship at the Chinese University of Hong Kong (1970–1971). He was a member of the Council on Foreign Relations.

Following his mandatory retirement from Columbia, Hohenberg maintained a peripatetic academic career as a visiting professor, lecturer and professional-in-residence, teaching at the University of Tennessee (1975; 1976–1977; 1978–1981; 1987), the University of Kansas (1977–1978), the University of Florida (1981–1982), Harvard University (1981), the University of Miami (1982–1983) and Syracuse University (1983–1985). During this period, he also returned to the Pulitzers as a journalism juror on several occasions and conducted an Asian lecture tour for the United States Information Agency in 1982. Throughout his journalistic and academic careers, he published 22 books, including a popular college journalism textbook (The Professional Journalist), a novel and several institutional histories of the Pulitzers.

== Personal life ==
Hohenberg married Dorothy Lannuier, a classmate at the Columbia Journalism School, in 1928. She died from complications of Alzheimer's disease in 1977; they had no children.

After residing in Park Slope, Brooklyn throughout his journalistic career, Hohenberg moved to a Columbia-owned faculty apartment at 90 Morningside Drive for the duration of his affiliation with the school. Throughout his adult life, he summered in Aquebogue, New York.

On August 6, 2000, he died in Knoxville, Tennessee, where he had lived since retiring from Columbia. He was survived by his second wife, JoAnn Fogarty Johnson, and her two children, whom he adopted.
