= Margaret Walker =

American poet and writer

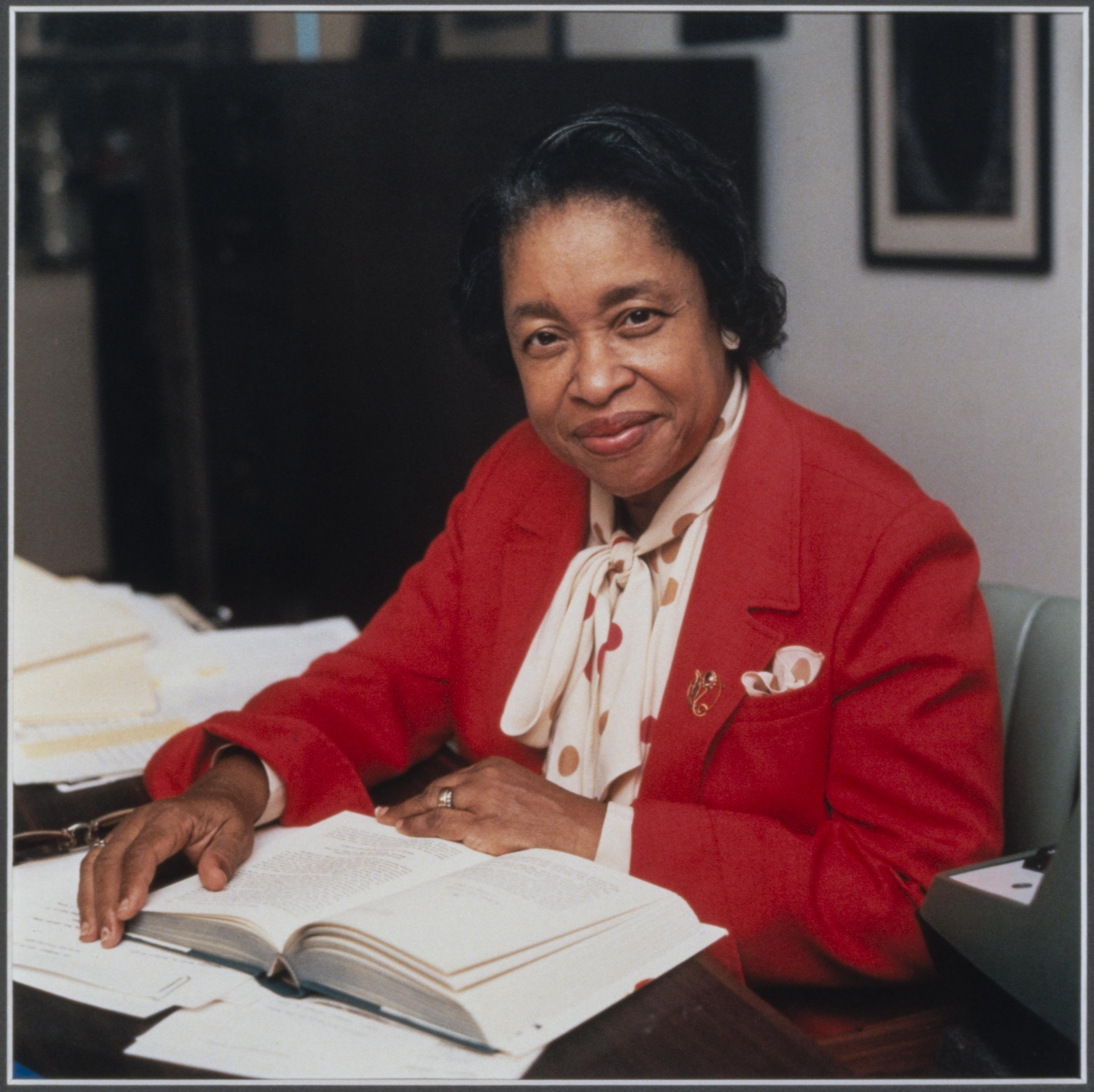
- Born: July 7, 1915; Birmingham, Alabama, U.S.
- Died: November 30, 1998 (aged 83); Chicago, Illinois, U.S.
- Occupations: Poet, novelist
- Spouse: Firnist Alexander
- Children: 4
- Writing career
- Notable works: For My People (1942); Jubilee (1966)

Margaret Walker (Margaret Abigail Walker Alexander by marriage; July 7, 1915 – November 30, 1998) was an American poet and writer. She was part of the African-American literary movement in Chicago, known as the Chicago Black Renaissance. Her notable works include For My People (1942) which won the Yale Series of Younger Poets Competition, and the novel Jubilee (1966), set in the South during the American Civil War.

== Biography ==
Walker was born in Birmingham, Alabama, to Sigismund C. Walker, a teacher, and Marion (née Dozier) Walker, who helped their daughter by teaching her philosophy and poetry as a child. She was captivated by the bedtime stories her grandmother told her, which were often tales of slavery. She knew at a young age that she wanted to become a writer so that she could write books about people of colour that would not make her feel ashamed. Her family moved to New Orleans when Walker was a young girl. At the age of 15, she showed a few of her poems to Langston Hughes, on a speaking tour at the moment, who recognised her talent. She attended school there, including several years of college at what is now Dillard University, before she moved north to Chicago. With the help of her English professor, E. B. Hungerford, who was also her mentor, Walker learned all the different forms of English poetry, the English metrical system, scansion of a poem, and memorised versification patterns.

In 1935, Walker received her Bachelor of Arts degree from Northwestern University. In 1936 she began work with the Federal Writers' Project under the Works Progress Administration of the President Franklin D. Roosevelt administration during the Great Depression. She worked alongside other young writers like Gwendolyn Brooks and Frank Yerby. Her supervisor, Jacob Scher, was so impressed with her talent that he allowed her to work from home on her own material, a privilege accorded no other member of the Illinois staff. She was a member of the South Side Writers Group, which included authors such as Richard Wright, Arna Bontemps, Fenton Johnson, Theodore Ward, and Frank Marshall Davis.

In 1942, she received her master's degree in creative writing from the University of Iowa. In 1965, she returned to that school to earn her Ph.D.

Walker married Firnist Alexander in 1943 and moved to Mississippi to be with him. They had four children together and lived in the Medgar Evers Historic District (formerly Elraine Subdivision) in the capital of Jackson.

== Academic career ==
Walker became a literature professor at what is today Jackson State University, an historically black college, where she taught from 1949 to 1979. In 1968, Walker founded the Institute for the Study of History, Life, and Culture of Black People (now the Margaret Walker Center) and her personal papers are now stored there. In 1976, she went on to serve as the institute's director.

== Literary writing ==
In 1942, Walker's poetry collection For My People won the Yale Series of Younger Poets Competition under the judgeship of editor Stephen Vincent Benét, making her the first black woman to receive a national writing prize. Her For My People was considered the "most important collection of poetry written by a participant in the Chicago Black Renaissance before Gwendolyn Brooks's A Street in Bronzeville." Richard Barksdale says: "The [title] poem was written when "world-wide pain, sorrow, and affliction were tangibly evident, and few could isolate the black man's dilemma from humanity's dilemma during the depression years or during the war years." He said that the power of resilience presented in the poem is a hope Walker holds out not only to black people but to all people, to "all the Adams and Eves."

Walker's second published book (and only novel), Jubilee (1966), is the story of a slave family during and after the Civil War, and is based on her great-grandmother's life. It took her thirty years to write. Roger Whitlow says: "It serves especially well as a response to white 'nostalgia' fiction about the antebellum and Reconstruction South."

This book is considered important in African-American literature. Walker was the first of a generation of women who started publishing more novels in the 1970s.

In 1975, Walker released three albums of poetry on Folkways Records – Margaret Walker Alexander Reads Poems of Paul Laurence Dunbar and James Weldon Johnson and Langston Hughes; Margaret Walker Reads Margaret Walker and Langston Hughes; and The Poetry of Margaret Walker.

Walker received a Candace Award from the National Coalition of 100 Black Women in 1989.

== Court cases ==
In 1978, Margaret Walker sued Alex Haley, claiming that his 1976 novel Roots: The Saga of an American Family had violated Jubilee's copyright by borrowing from her novel. The case was dismissed.

In 1991, Walker was sued by Ellen Wright, the widow of Richard Wright, on the grounds that Walker's use of unpublished letters and an unpublished journal in a just-published biography of Wright violated the widow's copyright. Wright v. Warner Books was dismissed by the district court, and this judgment was supported by the appeals court.

== Death and legacy ==
Walker died of breast cancer in Chicago, Illinois, in 1998, aged 83.

Walker was inducted into The Chicago Literary Hall of Fame in 2014.

Walker was honoured with a historical marker through the Mississippi Writers Trail.

== Works ==
- For My People. Ayer. 1968 [1942]. ISBN 978-0-405-01902-9.
- Prophets for a New Day. Broadside Press. 1970. ISBN 9780910296212.
- October Journey. Broadside Press. 1973. ISBN 978-0-910296-96-0.
- A Poetic Equation: Conversations Between Nikki Giovanni and Margaret Walker. Howard University Press. 1974. ISBN 9780882580036.
- Richard Wright, Daemonic Genius: A Portrait of the Man, a Critical Look at His Work. Warner Books. 1988. ISBN 9781567430042.
- This Is My Century: New and Collected Poems. University of Georgia Press. 1989. ISBN 978-0-8203-1135-7.
- Graham, Maryemma, ed. (1990). How I Wrote Jubilee and Other Essays on Life and Literature. Feminist Press. ISBN 978-1-55861-004-0.
- Graham, Maryemma, ed. (1997). On Being Female, Black, and Free: Essays by Margaret Walker, 1932-1992. University of Tennessee Press. ISBN 9780870499807.
- Jubilee. Houghton Mifflin Harcourt. 1999. ISBN 978-0-395-92495-2.
- Graham, Maryemma, ed. (2002). Conversations with Margaret Walker. University Press of Mississippi. ISBN 978-1-57806-512-7.

== Papers ==
- Galley sheets for Jubilee and original pre-corrected copy of A Poetic Equation at Millsaps-Wilson Library, Millsaps College, Jackson, Mississippi
- Margaret Walker Alexander Room and Collection, Jackson State University

== Film biography ==
- For My People, The Life and Writing of Margaret Walker, distributed by California Newsreel.

== Poetry and music ==
Margaret Walker's evocative poetry has inspired new musical compositions by 20th and 21st-century composers. Inspired works include Randy Klein's 2011 For My People — The Margaret Walker Song Cycle, a song cycle for choir (formerly entitled Lineage), and Edward W. Hardy's 2022 BORN FREE, a song cycle for soprano, violin and piano.
