= A. B. Guthrie Jr. =

American writer and historian (1901–1991)

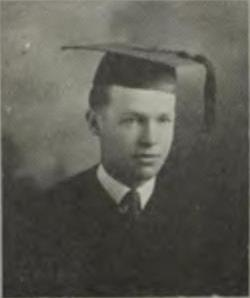
- Born: January 13, 1901; Bedford, Indiana, U.S.
- Died: April 26, 1991 (aged 90); Choteau, Montana, U.S.
- Education: University of Washington; University of Montana (BA)
- Occupation: Author

Alfred Bertram "Bud" Guthrie Jr. (January 13, 1901 – April 26, 1991) was an American novelist, screenwriter, historian, and literary historian known for writing western stories. His novel The Way West won the 1950 Pulitzer Prize for Fiction, and his screenplay for Shane (1953) was nominated for an Academy Award.

== Biography ==
Guthrie was born in 1901 in Bedford, Indiana. When he was six months old he relocated with his parents to Montana, where his father became the first principal of the Teton County Free High School in Choteau. His father was a graduate of Indiana University, his mother from Earlham College at Richmond, Indiana.

A constant reader, Guthrie tried to write while in high school, "fiction pretty much, some essays, but I majored in journalism. My father had been a newspaper man for four years in this little town in Kentucky, and I guess he thought it was the way to become a writer".^{:3}

In 1919, Guthrie studied at the University of Washington for a semester, then transferred to the University of Montana, where he was a member of Phi Sigma Kappa fraternity and graduated with a degree in journalism with honors in 1923. He worked odd jobs for the next few years.

In 1926, Guthrie took out a $300 bank loan and moved to Lexington, Kentucky, where he took a job at the Lexington Leader newspaper. For the next 21 years he worked as a reporter, the city editor, and an editorial writer for the Leader. Guthrie published his first novel Murders at Moon Dance in 1943.

In 1944, while still at the Leader, Guthrie won the Nieman Fellowship from Harvard, and spent the year at the university studying writing. While at Harvard he made friends with English professor Theodore Morrison, "who knew so much about writing, probably more than I ever will."^{:3} Morrison mentored Guthrie and helped him transition from journalism to fiction.

During his year at Harvard Guthrie began his novel The Big Sky, which was published in 1947. Guthrie later wrote, "It wasn't until I went to Harvard that I got in gear. Then I went back and worked for the newspaper for another year or so."^{:4}

At the Lexington Leader Guthrie's boss was very understanding and as long as Guthrie performed his news duties satisfactorily he was allowed to take his afternoons off to write fiction.^{:18} After publication of The Big Sky Guthrie left the paper and supported himself by teaching creative writing at University of Kentucky. During this time he published The Way West which won the 1950 Pulitzer Prize for Fiction. He quit teaching in 1952 to devote himself to writing full time, and moved back to Choteau, Montana, because he said it was his "point of outlook on the universe". He split his residence between Choteau and Great Falls, Montana, an hour away from Choteau.

Guthrie continued to write predominantly western subjects. He worked for a time in Hollywood, writing the screenplays for Shane (1953, for which he was nominated for an Academy Award) and The Kentuckian (1955).

His other books included These Thousand Hills (1956), The Blue Hen's Chick (1965), Arfive (1970), The Last Valley (1975), Fair Land, Fair Land (1982), Murder in the Cotswolds (1989), and A Field Guide to Writing Fiction (1991). His first collection of short stories, The Big It and Other Stories, was published in 1960.

== Personal life ==
Guthrie married Harriet Larson in 1931 and they had two children, Alfred B. 3rd, of Choteau, and Helen Miller of Butte, Montana. Harriet Guthrie died in the early 1960s, and he married Carol B. Luthin in 1969. He had two stepchildren, Herbert Luthin, of Clarion, Pennsylvania and Amy Sakariassen, of Bismarck, North Dakota.

== Bibliography ==
=== Western novels ===
- The Big Sky (1947)
- The Way West (1949)
- These Thousand Hills (1956)
- Arfive (1971)
- The Last Valley (1975)
- Fair Land, Fair Land (1982)

=== Western mystery novellas ===
- Murders at Moon Dance (1943)
- Wild Pitch (1974), featuring Sheriff Chick Charleston
- The Genuine Article (1977), featuring Sheriff Chick Charleston
- No Second Wind (1980), featuring Sheriff Chick Charleston
- Playing Catch-up (1985), featuring Sheriff Chick Charleston
- Murder in the Cotswolds (1989), featuring Sheriff Chick Charleston

=== Short-story collections ===
- The Big It, and Other Stories (1960), "Bargain" (originally titled "Bargain at Moon Dance")

=== Non-fiction ===
- The Blue Hen's Chick (1965), an autobiography
- Big Sky, Fair Land: The Environmental Essays of A. B. Guthrie Jr., edited by David Peterson (1988)
- A Field Guide to Writing Fiction (1991)

=== Children's books ===
- The Big Sky: An Edition For Young Readers (1950)
- Once Upon a Pond (1973)

=== Poetry ===
- Four Miles from Ear Mountain (1987)

=== Screenplays ===
- Shane (1953)
- The Kentuckian (1955)

=== Spoken word ===
- A. B. Guthrie Jr., reads from THE BIG SKY (Caedmon, 1974)
