= Lists of films based on books =

This is a list of articles that are lists of films based on books. Each list is based on a different genre of books.

- List of films based on arts books
- List of films based on children's books
- List of films based on civics books
- List of films based on crime books
- List of films based on film books
- List of films based on sports books
- List of films based on spy books
- List of films based on non-fiction books
