= List of films based on sports books =

On occasion, sports books have been used as source material for film adaptations. Popular sports in the United States such as baseball and American football have been adapted to film. Books about sports such as boxing, bullfighting, cockfighting, football, hockey, hunting have also been adapted.

== Baseball ==
Film	Date	Director	Country	Source work	Author	Date	Type
Death on the Diamond	1934	Edward Sedgwick	USA	Death on the Diamond: A Baseball Mystery Story	Cortland Fitzsimmons	1934	Novel
The Babe Ruth Story	1948	Roy Del Ruth	USA	The Babe Ruth Story	Bob Considine & Babe Ruth	1948	Autobiography
Bang the Drum Slowly *	1956	Daniel Petrie	USA	Bang the Drum Slowly	Mark Harris	1956	Novel
Fear Strikes Out	1957	Robert Mulligan	USA	Fear Strikes Out: The Jim Piersall Story	Jimmy Piersall & Albert S. Hirshberg	1955	Autobiography
Bang the Drum Slowly	1973	John D. Hancock	USA	Bang the Drum Slowly	Mark Harris	1956	Novel
It's Good to Be Alive	1974	Michael Landon	USA	It's Good to Be Alive	Roy Campanella	1960	Autobiography
The Natural	1984	Barry Levinson	USA	The Natural	Bernard Malamud	1952	Novel
Long Gone	1987	Martin Davidson	USA	Long Gone (novel)	Paul Hemphill	1979	Novel
Eight Men Out	1988	John Sayles	USA	8 Men Out	Eliot Asinof	1963	Non-fiction
Field of Dreams	1989	Phil Alden Robinson	USA	Shoeless Joe	W.P. Kinsella	1982	Novel
Cobb	1994	Ron Shelton	USA	Cobb: A Biography	Al Stump	1994	Non-fiction
The Fan	1996	Tony Scott	USA	The Fan	Peter Abrahams	1995	Novel
For Love of the Game	1999	Sam Raimi	USA	For Love of the Game	Michael Shaara	1991	Novel
American Pastime	2007	Desmond Nakano	USA	Through a Diamond: 100 Years of Japanese American Baseball (uncredited)	Kerry Yo Nakagawa (uncredited)	2002	Non-fiction
Moneyball	2011	Bennett Miller	USA	Moneyball: The Art of Winning an Unfair Game	Michael Lewis	2003	Non-fiction

- * television film.

=== Comedies ===
Film	Date	Director	Country	Source work	Author	Date	Type
Rhubarb	1951	Arthur Lubin	USA	Rhubarb	H. Allen Smith	1946	Novel
Fever Pitch	2005	Farrelly Brothers	USA	Fever Pitch ♠	Nick Hornby	1992	Memoir

- ♠ The book Fever Pitch is about a fan of football and Arsenal Football Club in particular, not the baseball team, the Boston Red Sox.

== Basketball ==
Film	Date	Director	Country	Source work	Author	Date	Type
Glory Road	2006	James Gartner	USA	Glory Road	Don Haskins	2005	Autobiography

- * television film.

== Bodybuilding ==
Film	Date	Director	Country	Source work	Author	Date	Type
Stay Hungry	1976	Bob Rafelson	USA	Stay Hungry	Charles Gaines	1972	Novel

== Boxing ==
Film	Date	Director	Country	Source work	Author	Date	Type
City for Conquest	1940	Anatole Litvak & Jean Negulesco (uncredited)	USA	City for Conquest	Aben Kandel	1936	Novel
Gentleman Jim	1942	Raoul Walsh	USA	The Roar of the Crowd	James J. Corbett	1894	Autobiography
Fat City	1972	John Huston	USA	Fat City	Leonard Gardner	1969	Novel
Mandingo	1975	Richard Fleischer	USA	Mandingo	Kyle Onstott	1957	Novel
Raging Bull	1980	Martin Scorsese	USA	Raging Bull: My Story	Jake LaMotta & Joseph Carter	1970	Autobiography
The Hurricane	1999	Norman Jewison	USA	The 16th Round	Rubin "Hurricane" Carter	199?	Non-fiction

== Bullfighting ==
Film	Date	Director	Country	Source work	Author	Date	Type
Ferdinand the Bull	1938	Dick Rickard	USA	The Story of Ferdinand	Munro Leaf	1936	Children's Book
Sangre y arena	1917	Ricardo de Baños & Vicente Blasco Ibáñez	Spain	Blood and Sand	Vicente Blasco Ibáñez	1909	Novel
Blood and Sand	1922	Fred Niblo	USA	Blood and Sand	Vicente Blasco Ibáñez	1909	Novel

=== Running of the Bulls ===
Film	Date	Director	Country	Source work	Author	Date	Type
The Sun Also Rises	1957	Henry King	USA	The Sun Also Rises	Ernest Hemingway	1926	Novel

== Buzkashi ==
Film	Date	Director	Country	Source work	Author	Date	Type
The Devil's Pass La Passe du diable	1958	Jacques Dupont & Pierre Schoendoerffer	Italy, France, Spain	Témoin parmi les hommes: Le Jeu du Roi	Joseph Kessel	1956	?
The Horsemen	1971	John Frankenheimer	USA	Les Cavaliers	Joseph Kessel	1967	Novel
Caravans	1978	James Fargo	USA & Iran	Caravans	James Michener	1962	Novel

== Car racing ==
Film	Date	Director	Country	Source work	Author	Date	Type
The Last American Hero	1973	Lamont Johnson	USA	"The Last American Hero" from The Kandy-Kolored Tangerine-Flake Streamline Baby	Tom Wolfe	1965	Article
Bobby Deerfield	1977	Sydney Pollack	USA	Heaven Has No Favorites	Erich Maria Remarque	1959	Novel
Blink of an Eye	2019	Paul Taublieb	USA	In the Blink of an Eye	Michael Waltrip with Ellis Henican	2011	Autobiography

=== Comedies ===
Film	Date	Director	Country	Source work	Author	Date	Type
The Love Bug	1968	Robert Stevenson	USA	Car, Boy, Girl	Gordon Buford	1961	Novel
Stroker Ace	1983	Hal Needham	USA	Stand On It	William Neely & Robert K. Ottum	1971	Novel

== Cockfighting ==
(Popular and legal in Mexico)

Film	Date	Director	Country	Source work	Author	Date	Type
Cockfighter	1974	Monte Hellman	USA	Cockfighter	Charles Willeford	1962/1972	Novel

== Cycling ==
Film	Date	Director	Country	Source work	Author	Date	Type
The Program	2015	Stephen Frears	UK, France	Seven Deadly Sins	David Walsh	2012	Non-fiction

== Diving ==
Film	Date	Director	Country	Source work	Author	Date	Type
Breaking the Surface: The Greg Louganis Story *	1997	Steven Hilliard Stern	USA	Breaking the Surface	Greg Louganis & Eric Marcus	1996	Autobiography

- * television film.

== Falconry ==
Film	Date	Director	Country	Source work	Author	Date	Type
Kes	1969	Ken Loach	UK	A Kestrel for a Knave	Barry Hines	1968	Novel
The Falcons Magasiskola	1970	István Gaál	Hungary	Magasiskola	Miklós Mészöly	1967	Novel
The Hawk Is Dying	2006	Julian Goldberger	USA	The Hawk Is Dying	Harry Crews	1973	Novel

== Fencing ==
Film	Date	Director	Country	Source work	Author	Date	Type
The Last Days of Patton ♠ *	1986	Delbert Mann	USA	The Last Days of Patton	Ladislas Farago	1981	Non-fiction
The Fencing Master El maestro de esgrima	1992	Pedro Olea	Spain	The Fencing Master	Arturo Pérez-Reverte	1988	Novel

- ♠ Gen. George Patton relaxes in occupied Bavaria with fencing and horseback riding.
- * television film.

== Fishing ==
Film	Date	Director	Country	Source work	Author	Date	Type
A River Runs Through It	1992	Robert Redford	USA	A River Runs Through It and Other Stories	Norman Maclean	1976	Novella
The Old Man and the Sea	1958	John Sturges	USA	The Old Man and the Sea	Ernest Hemingway	1952	Novella
The Old Man and the Sea *	1990	Jud Taylor	UK	The Old Man and the Sea	Ernest Hemingway	1952	Novella
The Old Man and the Sea Старик и море	1999	Aleksandr Petrov	Canada, Russia, Japan	The Old Man and the Sea	Ernest Hemingway	1952	Novella

- * television film.

== Football/soccer ==
Film	Date	Director	Country	Source work	Author	Date	Type
The Arsenal Stadium Mystery	1939	Thorold Dickinson	UK	The Arsenal Stadium Mystery	Leonard R. Gribble	1939	Novel
Yesterday's Hero	1979	Neil Leifer	UK	?	Jackie Collins	197?	Novel
Fever Pitch	1997	David Evans	UK	Fever Pitch	Nick Hornby	1992	Memoir
The Game of Their Lives	2005	David Anspaugh	USA	The Game of Their Lives	Geoffrey Douglas	1996	Non-fiction
The Damned United	2009	Tom Hooper	UK	The Damned Utd	David Peace	2006	Novel
One Night in Turin	2010	James Erskine	UK	All Played Out: The Full Story of Italia '90	Pete Davies	2006	Non-fiction

== Football, American ==
Professional, college, high school

Film	Date	Director	Country	Source work	Author	Date	Type	TV	Date	Country
Navy Blue and Gold	1937	Sam Wood	USA	Navy Blue and Gold	George Bruce	1937?	Novel	-	-	-
Jim Thorpe – All-American	1951	Michael Curtiz	USA	?	Jim Thorpe	19??	Autobiography	-	-	-
Brian's Song	1971	Buzz Kulik	USA	I Am Third	Gale Sayers & Al Silverman	1970	Autobiography	Brian's Song	2001	USA
North Dallas Forty	1979	Ted Kotcheff	USA	North Dallas Forty	Peter Gent	1973	Novel	-	-	-
Fighting Back: The Rocky Bleier Story	1980	Robert Lieberman	USA	Fighting Back: The Rocky Bleier Story	Rocky Bleier	1975	Autobiography	-	-	-
Everybody's All-American	1988	Taylor Hackford	USA	Everybody's All-American	Frank Deford	1981	Novel	-	-	-
Any Given Sunday	1999	Oliver Stone	USA	On Any Given Sunday (uncredited)	Pat Toomay (uncredited)	1984	Novel	-	-	-
Monday Night Mayhem	2002	Ernest R. Dickerson	USA	Monday Night Mayhem: The Inside Story of ABC's Monday Night Football	Bill Carter & Marc Gunther	1988	Non-fiction	-	-	-
The Junction Boys *	2002	Mike Robe	USA	The Junction Boys	Jim Dent	2001	Non-fiction	-	-	-
Friday Night Lights	2004	Peter Berg	USA	Friday Night Lights: A Town, a Team, and a Dream	H. G. Bissinger	1990	Non-fiction	Friday Night Lights	2006	USA
Code Breakers *	2005	Rod Holcomb	USA	A Return to Glory: the Untold Story of Honor, Dishonor, and Triumph at the United States Military Academy, 1950-53	Bill McWilliams	2000	Non-fiction	-	-	-
The Express: The Ernie Davis Story	2008	Gary Fleder	USA	Ernie Davis, the Elmira Express: the Story of a Heisman Trophy Winner	Robert C. Gallagher	1983	Biography	-	-	-
The Blind Side	2009	John Lee Hancock	USA	The Blind Side: Evolution of a Game	Michael Lewis	2006	Non-fiction	-	-	-
Radio	2003	Mike Tollin	USA	"Someone to Lean On"	Gary Smith	1996	Article	-	-	-

- * television film.

=== Comedies ===
Film	Date	Director	Country	Source work	Author	Date	Type
Horse Feathers	1932	Norman Z. McLeod	USA	Fun in Hi Skule	Marx Brothers	1920s	Vaudeville
The Gladiator	1938	Edward Sedgwick	USA	Gladiator	Philip Wylie	1930	Novel
Paper Lion	1968	Alex March	USA	Paper Lion	George Plimpton	1966	Memoir
Semi-Tough	1977	Michael Ritchie	USA	Semi-Tough	Dan Jenkins	1972	Novel

=== Off the field ===
(Terrorism became a regular part of news reports in the early 1970s, and this theme was extended to popular fiction.)

Film	Date	Director	Country	Source work	Author	Date	Type
Two-Minute Warning	1976	Larry Peerce	USA	Two-Minute Warning	George La Fountaine, Sr.	197?	Novel
Black Sunday	1977	John Frankenheimer	USA	Black Sunday	Thomas Harris	1975	Novel

== Football, Australian ==
Film	Date	Director	Country	Source work	Author	Date	Type
The Great Macarthy	1975	David Baker	Australia	A Salute to the Great Macarthy	Barry Oakley	1970	Novel
Australian Rules	2002	Paul Goldman	Australia	Deadly, Unna?	Phillip Gwynne	1998	Novel

== Football, Canadian ==
Professional and university

Film	Date	Director	Country	Source work	Author	Date	Type
The Man Who Lost Himself * aka The Stranger I Married	2005	Helen Shaver	Canada	The Man Who Lost Himself: The Terry Evanshen Story	June Callwood	2000	Non-fiction

- * television film.

== Golf ==
Film	Date	Director	Country	Source work	Author	Date	Type
Dead Solid Perfect *	1988	Bobby Roth	USA	Dead Solid Perfect	Dan Jenkins	1974	Novel
The Legend of Bagger Vance	2000	Robert Redford	USA	The Legend of Bagger Vance	Steven Pressfield	1995	Novel
A Gentleman's Game	2002	J. Mills Goodloe	USA	A Gentleman's Game	Tom Coyne	2001	Novel
The Greatest Game Ever Played	2005	Bill Paxton	USA	The Greatest Game Ever Played: Harry Vardon, Francis Ouimet, and the Birth of Modern Golf	Mark Frost	2002	Non-fiction
Tommy's Honour	2016	Jason Connery	UK/USA	Tommy's Honor: The Story of Old Tom Morris and Young Tom Morris, Golf's Founding Father and Son	Kevin Cook	2007	Non-fiction

- * television film.

== Gymnastics ==
Film	Date	Director	Country	Source work	Author	Date	Type
Peaceful Warrior	2006	Victor Salva	USA	Way of the Peaceful Warrior	Dan Millman	1980	Novel/ Memoir

== Ice hockey ==
Film	Date	Director	Country	Source work	Author	Date	Type
Face-Off	1971	George McCowan	Canada	Face-Off	Scott Young & George Robertson	1971^{¤}	Novel
Net Worth *	1995	Jerry Ciccoritti	Canada	Net Worth: Exploding the Myth of Pro Hockey	David Cruise & Alison Griffiths	1991	Non-fiction
Breakfast with Scot	2007	Laurie Lynd	Canada	Breakfast with Scot	Michael Downing	1999	Novel
Indian Horse	2017	Stephen Campanelli	Canada	Indian Horse	Richard Wagamese	2012	Novel

- * television film.

== Horse racing ==
Film	Date	Director	Country	Source work	Author	Date	Type
National Velvet	1944	Clarence Brown	USA	National Velvet	Enid Bagnold	1935	Novel
Dead Cert	1974	Tony Richardson	UK	Dead Cert	Dick Francis	1962	Novel
International Velvet	1978	Bryan Forbes	USA	National Velvet	Enid Bagnold	1935	Novel
Champions	1983	John Irvin	UK	Champion's Story	Bob Champion & Jonathan Powell	197?	Autobiography
Let It Ride	1989	Joe Pytka	USA	Good Vibes	Jay Cronley	1979	Novel
Seabiscuit	2003	Gary Ross	USA	Seabiscuit: An American Legend	Laura Hillenbrand	2001	Non-fiction
Secretariat	2010	Randall Wallace	USA	Secretariat: The Making of a Champion (uncredited)	William Nack	1975	Non-fiction

=== Comedies ===
Film	Date	Director	Country	Source work	Author	Date	Type
Francis Goes to the Races	1951	Arthur Lubin	USA	Francis (characters)	David Stern	1946	Novel

=== Overland ===
Film	Date	Director	Country	Source work	Author	Date	Type
Hidalgo	2004	Joe Johnston	USA	?	Frank Hopkins	1891	Memoir (discredited)

== Hot air ballooning ==
Film	Date	Director	Country	Source work	Author	Date	Type
Five Weeks in a Balloon	1962	Irwin Allen	USA	Five Weeks in a Balloon, or, Journeys and Discoveries in Africa by Three Englishmen	Jules Verne	1863	Novel
Flight of the Eagle Ingenjör Andrées luftfärd	1982	Jan Troell	Sweden, West Germany, Norway	Ingenjör Andrées luftfärd	Per Olof Sundman	1967	Novel

== Hunting ==
=== Fox hunting ===
Film	Date	Director	Country	Source work	Author	Date	Type
The Voice of Bugle Ann	1936	Richard Thorpe	USA	The Voice of Bugle Ann	MacKinlay Kantor	193?	Novel
The Fox and the Hound	1981	Ted Berman & Richard Rich	USA	The Fox and the Hound	Daniel P. Mannix	1967	Novel

=== Game ===
Film	Date	Director	Country	Source work	Author	Date	Type
The Last Hunt	1956	Richard Brooks	USA	The Last Hunt	Milton Lott	1954	Novel
Shalako	1968	Edward Dmytryk	USA	Shalako	Louis L'Amour	1962	Novel
White Hunter Black Heart	1990	Clint Eastwood	USA	White Hunter Black Heart ♠	Peter Viertel	1953	Novel

- ♠ A roman à clef about director John Huston filming The African Queen.

=== Game birds ===
Film	Date	Director	Country	Source work	Author	Date	Type
The Shooting Party	1985	Alan Bridges	UK	The Shooting Party	Isabel Colegate	1980	Novel
My Father's Glory	1990	Yves Robert	France	La Gloire de mon père & Le Temps des secrets	Marcel Pagnol	1957 & 1959	Novels/Memoirs
La Horse ♠ La Horse	1970	Pierre Granier-Deferre	France	La Horse	Michel Lambesc	196?	Novel

- ♠ A duck-hunting grandfather (Jean Gabin) takes on a gang of drug traffickers.

== Hiking ==
Film	Date	Director	Country	Source work	Author	Date	Type
Wild	2014	Jean-Marc Vallée	USA	Wild: From Lost to Found on the Pacific Crest Trail	Cheryl Strayed	2012	Memoir

== Hurling ==
Film	Date	Director	Country	Source work	Author	Date	Type
Rooney	1956	George Pollock	UK	Rooney	Catherine Cookson	1957	Novel

== Jai alai ==
Film	Date	Director	Country	Source work	Author	Date	Type
The Spanish Gardener	1956	Philip Leacock	UK	The Spanish Gardener	A. J. Cronin	1950	Novel

== Kite flying ==
Film	Date	Director	Country	Source work	Author	Date	Type
The Kite Runner	2007	Marc Forster	USA	The Kite Runner	Khaled Hosseini	2003	Novel

== Lacrosse ==
(Lacrosse is the official national (summer) sport of Canada)

Film	Date	Director	Country	Source work	Author	Date	Type
The Express: The Ernie Davis Story ♠	2008	Gary Fleder	USA	Ernie Davis, the Elmira Express: the Story of a Heisman Trophy Winner	Robert C. Gallagher	1983	Non-fiction

- ♠ Ernie Davis plays briefly with fellow football star Jim Brown, who was also a lacrosse superstar at Syracuse University.

== Marathon ==
Film	Date	Director	Country	Source work	Author	Date	Type
The Marathon Runner Der Läufer von Marathon	1933	Ewald André Dupont	Nazi Germany	Der Läufer von Marathon : Ein Sportroman	Werner Scheff	1928	Novel
Stockholm Marathon	1994	Peter Keglevic	Sweden & Germany	The Terrorists	Sjöwall and Wahlöö	1975	Novel

== Marathon dancing ==
Film	Date	Director	Country	Source work	Author	Date	Type
They Shoot Horses, Don't They?	1969	Sydney Pollack	USA	They Shoot Horses, Don't They?	Horace McCoy	1935	Novel

== Motorcycle racing ==
Film	Date	Director	Country	Source work	Author	Date	Type
The Last Hero	1982	Haruki Kadokawa	Japan	The Last Hero	Haruhiko Ôyabu	1968	Novel

== Mountaineering ==
Film	Date	Director	Country	Source work	Author	Date	Type
Struggle for the Matterhorn	1928	Mario Bonnard & Nunzio Malasomma	Germany & Switzerland	Kampf ums Matterhorn	Carl Haensel	1928	Novel
The Mountain Calls	1938	Luis Trenker	Nazi Germany	Kampf ums Matterhorn	Carl Haensel	1928	Novel
High Conquest	1947	Irving Allen	USA	High Conquest	James Ramsey Ullman	194?	Novel
The White Tower	1950	Ted Tetzlaff	USA	The White Tower	James Ramsey Ullman	1945	Novel
The Mountain	1956	Edward Dmytryk	USA	La Neige en deuil	Henri Troyat	1952	Novel
Third Man on the Mountain	1959	Ken Annakin	USA	Banner in the Sky	James Ramsey Ullman	1955	Novel
K2	1992	Franc Roddam	USA	K2	Patrick Meyers, Scott Roberts	1990	Novel/ Memoir
The Ascent	1994	Donald Shebib	Canada & USA	No Picnic on Mount Kenya: The Story of Three P.O.W.s' Escape to Adventure	Felice Benuzzi	1948	Memoir
Into Thin Air: Death on Everest *	1997	Robert Markowitz	USA & Czech Republic	Into Thin Air: A Personal Account of the Mt. Everest Disaster	Jon Krakauer	1997	Memoir/ Non-fiction
Vertical Limit	2000	Martin Campbell	USA	Vertical Limit	Robert King, Terry Hayes	2000	Non-fiction
Everest '82 * aka Everest	2008	Graeme Campbell	Canada	Canadians on Everest: The Courageous Expedition of 1982	Bruce Patterson	1990	Non-fiction

- * television film.

== Polo ==
Film	Date	Director	Country	Source work	Author	Date	Type
Once Before I Die ♠	1966	John Derek	USA	Quit for the Next	Lt. Anthony March	1945	Novel

- ♠ Polo-playing US cavalrymen resist Japanese invasion.

== Roller derby ==
Film	Date	Director	Country	Source work	Author	Date	Type
Whip It	2009	Drew Barrymore	USA	Derby Girl	Shauna Cross	2007	Novel

== Rowing ==
Film	Date	Director	Country	Source work	Author	Date	Type
True Blue	1996	Ferdinand Fairfax	UK	True Blue: The Oxford Boat Race Mutiny	Daniel Topolski & Patrick Robinson	1989	Memoir/ Non-fiction
The Company ♠ *	2007	Mikael Salomon	USA	The Company: A Novel of the CIA	Robert Littell	2002	Novel
Three Men in a Boat	1956	Ken Annakin	UK	Three Men in a Boat (To Say Nothing of the Dog)	Jerome K. Jerome	1889	Novel
Three Men in a Boat *	1975	Stephen Frears	UK	Three Men in a Boat (To Say Nothing of the Dog)	Jerome K. Jerome	1889	Novel

- ♠ Two rowers are recruited by the CIA, and the sport follows the agents through their lives.
- * television film.

== Rugby league ==
Film	Date	Director	Country	Source work	Author	Date	Type
This Sporting Life	1963	Lindsay Anderson	UK	This Sporting Life	David Storey	1960	Novel

== Rugby union ==
Film	Date	Director	Country	Source work	Author	Date	Type
Invictus	2009	Clint Eastwood	USA	Playing the Enemy: Nelson Mandela and the Game That Changed a Nation	John Carlin	2008	Non-fiction

=== Off the field ===
Film	Date	Director	Country	Source work	Author	Date	Type
Supervivientes de los Andes	1976	René Cardona jr.	Mexico	Survive	Clay Blair	1973	Non-fiction
Alive	1993	Frank Marshall	USA	Alive: The Story of the Andes Survivors	Piers Paul Read	1974	Non-fiction

== Sailing ==
(Yachting)

Film	Date	Director	Country	Source work	Author	Date	Type
The Deep (unfinished)	1970	Orson Welles	USA	Dead Calm	Charles F. Williams	1963	Novel
Dead Calm	1989	Phillip Noyce	Australia	Dead Calm	Charles F. Williams	1963	Novel
White Squall	1996	Ridley Scott	USA	The Last Voyage of the Albatross	Chuck Gieg & Felix Sutton	1962	Non-fiction
Two Came Back *	1997	Dick Lowry	USA	Albatross	Deborah Scaling-Kiley & Meg Noonan	199?	Novel?/ Memoir
Mutiny ♠	1925	F. Martin Thornton	UK	?	Ben Bolt	192?	Novel

- ♠ No plot is currently available for this yachting film.
- * television film.

== Scuba diving and snorkelling ==
Film	Date	Director	Country	Source work	Author	Date	Type
The Deep	1977	Peter Yates	USA	The Deep	Peter Benchley	1976	Novel

== Skating ==
Film	Date	Director	Country	Source work	Author	Date	Type
Thin Ice	1937	Sidney Lanfield	USA	Thin Ice (?)	Attila Orbók Orbók Attila	193?	Novel

== Skiing ==
Film	Date	Director	Country	Source work	Author	Date	Type
Downhill Racer	1969	Michael Ritchie	USA	The Downhill Racers	Oakley Hall	1963	Novel
The Other Side of the Mountain	1975	Larry Peerce	USA	A Long Way Up: the Story of Jill Kinmont	E.G. Valens	1966	Non-fiction
Crazy Canucks *	2004	Randy Bradshaw	Canada	White Circus (uncredited)	Ken Read & Matthew Fisher (uncredited)	1987	Novel

- * television film.

== Skydiving ==
Film	Date	Director	Country	Source work	Author	Date	Type
The Gypsy Moths	1969	John Frankenheimer	USA	The Gypsy Moths, A Fable	James Drought	1955	Novel

== Stunt driving ==
Film	Date	Director	Country	Source work	Author	Date	Type
My House in Umbria ♠ *	2003	Richard Loncraine	UK & Italy	My House in Umbria	William Trevor	1991	Novella

- ♠ The film includes flashbacks of the Wall of Death.
- * television film.

== Surfing ==
Film	Date	Director	Country	Source work	Author	Date	Type
Gidget	1959	Paul Wendkos	USA	Gidget, The Little Girl With Big Ideas	Frederick Kohner	1957	Novel
Blue Crush	2002	John Stockwell	USA & Germany	"Surf Girls of Maui"	Susan Orlean	200?	Article
Soul Surfer	2010	Sean McNamara	USA	Soul Surfer: A True Story of Faith, Family, and Fighting to Get Back on the Board	Bethany Hamilton	2004	Autobiography

== Swimming ==
Film	Date	Director	Country	Source work	Author	Date	Type
Swimming Upstream	2003	Russell Mulcahy	Australia	Swimming Upstream	Anthony Fingleton	?	Autobiography

== Tennis ==
=== Real tennis ===
Film	Date	Director	Country	Source work	Author	Date	Type
The Seven Percent Solution ♠	1976	Herbert Ross	UK & USA	The Seven-Per-Cent Solution: Being a Reprint from the Reminiscences of John H. Watson, M.D.	Nicholas Meyer	1974	Novel

- ♠ Sigmund Freud plays a match.

== Track and field ==
Film	Date	Director	Country	Source work	Author	Date	Type
Blackbeard's Ghost	1968	Robert Stevenson	USA	Blackbeard's Ghost	Ben Stahl	1965	Novel

== Wrestling ==
Film	Date	Director	Country	Source work	Author	Date	Type
The Gladiator	1938	Edward Sedgwick	USA	Gladiator	Philip Wylie	1930	Novel

== Historical sports ==
=== Chariot racing ===
Film	Date	Director	Country	Source work	Author	Date	Type
Quo Vadis ♠	1951	Mervyn LeRoy	USA	Quo Vadis	Henryk Sienkiewicz	1895	Novel
Ben-Hur	1907	Sidney Olcott	USA	Ben-Hur: A Tale of the Christ	Lew Wallace	1880	Novel
Ben-Hur	1925	Fred Niblo	USA	Ben-Hur: A Tale of the Christ	Lew Wallace	1880	Novel
Ben-Hur	1959	William Wyler	USA	Ben-Hur: A Tale of the Christ	Lew Wallace	1880	Novel

- ♠ A chase, rather than a race.

=== Gladiatorial combat ===
Film	Date	Director	Country	Source work	Author	Date	Type
Spartaco	1913	Giovanni Enrico Vidali	Italy	Spartaco	Raffaello Giovagnoli	1873	Novel
Spartacus	1960	Stanley Kubrick	USA	Spartacus	Howard Fast	1951	Novel
The Sword in the Stone	1963	Wolfgang Reitherman	USA	The Sword in the Stone	T. H. White	1938/1958	Novel
Spartacus (television miniseries)	2004		USA				

== See also ==
- List of movies about sports
- Sports film
- Baseball movie

Pages with the same format

- List of films based on arts books
- List of films based on civics books
- List of films based on crime books
- List of films based on film books
- List of films based on spy books
- List of films based on westerns

== Bibliography ==
- Lavington, Stephen. Virgin Film: Oliver Stone, Virgin Books, London, 2004.
- (fr) Julien Camy and Gérard Camy, Sport&Cinéma, ed. Du Bailli de Suffren, 2016, (1200 films, 60 sports, 80 interviews)
