= List of films based on western fiction =

A list of films that are based on western fiction.

Geographically, this page encompasses the frontiers of the United States, Canada, and Mexico, as well as Australia and South America.
At present, South Africa and Siberia are not included.

== 17th and 18th centuries ==
=== Missionaries ===
#	Film	Date	Director	Country	Source work	Author	Date	Type
1	Black Robe	1991	Bruce Beresford	Canada & Australia	Black Robe	Brian Moore	1985	Novel

=== Settlers ===
#	Film	Date	Director	Country	Source work	Author	Date	Type
1	Penn of Pennsylvania	1942	Lance Comfort	UK	William Penn	C. E. Vulliamy	1933	Biography

== 19th century ==
(and the Edwardian age)

=== Unclassified ===
#	Film	Date	Director	Country	Source work	Author	Date	Type
n	Monte Walsh	1970	William A. Fraker	USA	Monte Walsh	Jack Schaefer	1963	Novel
n	Monte Walsh *	2003	Simon Wincer	USA	Monte Walsh	Jack Schaefer	1963	Novel
n	Shane	1953	George Stevens	USA	Shane	Jack Schaefer	1949	Novel
n	The Searchers	1956	John Ford	USA	The Searchers	Alan Le May	1954	Novel
n					The Avenging Texans	Alan Le May	1954	Serial
n	Warlock	1959	Edward Dmytryk	USA	Warlock	Oakley Hall	1958	Novel
n	Valdez Is Coming	1971	Edwin Sherin	USA	Valdez Is Coming	Elmore Leonard	1970	Novel
n	The Shootist	1976	Don Siegel	USA	The Shootist	Glendon Swarthout	1975	Novel
n	Stagecoach	1939	John Ford	USA	"The Stage to Lordsburg"	Ernest Haycox	1937	Story
n	Red River	1948	Howard Hawks	USA	"Chisholm Trail"	Borden Chase	193?	Story
n	The Cowboys	1972	Mark Rydell	USA	The Cowboys	William Dale Jennings	1971	Novel
n	Shalako	1968	Edward Dmytryk	USA	Shalako	Louis L'Amour	1962	Novel
n	The Jack Bull *	1999	John Badham	USA	Michael Kohlhaas	Heinrich von Kleist	1811	Novella
n	Broken Lance	1954	Edward Dmytryk	USA	I'll Never Go There Any More	Jerome Weidman	1941	Novel
n	The Bravados	1958	Henry King	USA	The Bravados	Frank O'Rourke	1957	Novel
n	Breakheart Pass	1975	Tom Gries	USA	Breakheart Pass	Alistair MacLean	1974	Novel

- * television film.

==== Frequently filmed: Riders of the Purple Sage ====
#	Film	Date	Director	Country	Source work	Author	Date	Type
1	Riders of the Purple Sage	1931	Hamilton MacFadden	USA	Riders of the Purple Sage	Zane Grey	1912	Novel

=== Bushrangers ===
#	Film	Date	Director	Country	Source work	Author	Date	Type
1	Ned Kelly	2003	Gregor Jordan	Australia	Our Sunshine	Robert Drewe	1991	Novel

=== Cavalrymen ===
#	Film	Date	Director	Country	Source work	Author	Date	Type
1	The Hallelujah Trail	1965	John Sturges	USA	Hallelujah Train	William Gulick	1963	Novel

=== Cowboys ===
#	Film	Date	Director	Country	Source work	Author	Date	Type
1	Four Faces West	1948	Alfred E. Green	USA	Pasó por aquí (?)	Eugene Manlove Rhodes	193?	Novel

=== Entertainers and mythmakers ===
#	Film	Date	Director	Country	Source work	Author	Date	Type	TV	Date	Country
1	Annie Get Your Gun	1950	George Sidney	USA	Annie Get Your Gun	Herbert Fields & Dorothy Fields (book), Irving Berlin (lyrics)	1946	Musical	-	-	-
2	Buffalo Bill and the Indians, or Sitting Bull's History Lesson	1976	Robert Altman	USA	Indians	Arthur Kopit	1969	Play	-	-	-

=== Explorers ===
#	Film	Date	Director	Country	Source work	Author	Date	Type
1	The Far Horizons	1955	Rudolph Maté	USA	Sacajawea of the Shoshones	Della Gould Emmons	1943	Novel
2	Passage †	2008	John Walker	Canada	Fatal Passage	Ken McGoogan	2001	Non-fiction

- † Dramatized documentary.

=== Forty-niners and goldseekers ===
#	Film	Date	Director	Country	Source work	Author	Date	Type
1	The Hanging Tree	1959	Delmer Daves & Karl Malden (uncredited)	USA	The Hanging Tree	Dorothy M. Johnson	1957	Stories (?)

==== California Gold Rush ====
1848–1855

=== Gauchos, charros y vaqueros ===
==== Frequently filmed: Martín Fierro ====
#	Film	Date	Director	Country	Source work	Author	Date	Type
1	Nobleza gaucha	1915	Humberto Cairo, Ernesto Gunche, Eduardo Martinez de la Pera	Argentina	Martín Fierro	José Hernández	1872–1879	Poem
1					Santos Vega	Rafael Obligado	188?	Poem
2	Martín Fierro	1968	Leopoldo Torre Nilsson	Argentina	Martín Fierro	José Hernández	1872–1879	Poem

=== Gunfighters ===
Film	Date	Director	Country	Source work	Author	Date	Type
Open Range	2003	Kevin Costner	USA	The Open Range Men	Lauran Paine	1990	Novel

=== Hunters ===
#	Film	Date	Director	Country	Source work	Author	Date	Type
1	The Last Hunt	1956	Richard Brooks	USA	The Last Hunt	Milton Lott	1954	Novel

=== Indians ===
#	Film	Date	Director	Country	Source work	Author	Date	Type
1	Broken Arrow	1950	Delmer Daves	USA	Blood Brother	Elliott Arnold	1947	Novel
2	Ishi: The Last of His Tribe *	1978	Robert Ellis Miller	USA	Ishi in Two Worlds: a Biography of the Last Wild Indian in North America	Theodora Kroeber	1961	Biography
3	The Last of His Tribe *	1992	Harry Hook	USA	Ishi in Two Worlds: a Biography of the Last Wild Indian in North America	Theodora Kroeber	1961	Biography

- * television film.

==== Frequently filmed: "A Man Called Horse" ====
#	Film	Date	Director	Country	Source work	Author	Date	Type
1	A Man Called Horse	1970	Elliot Silverstein	USA	"A Man Called Horse (short story)" from Indian Country	Dorothy M. Johnson	1950–1968	Story

=== Lawmen ===
#	Film	Date	Director	Country	Source work	Author	Date	Type
1	High Noon	1952	Fred Zinnemann	USA	"The Tin Star"	John W. Cunningham	1947	Story
2	Wild Bill	1995	Walter Hill	USA	Deadwood	Peter Dexter	1986	Novel
2					Fathers and Sons	Thomas Babe	1978	Play

==== Frequently filmed: Destry Rides Again ====
#	Film	Date	Director	Country	Source work	Author	Date	Type
1	Destry Rides Again	1939	George Marshall	USA	Destry Rides Again	"Max Brand"	1930	Novel

=== Lumberjacks ===
#	Film	Date	Director	Country	Source work	Author	Date	Type
1	Seven Brides for Seven Brothers	1954	Stanley Donen	USA	"The Sobbin' Women"	Stephen Vincent Benét	195?	Story

=== Missionaries ===
#	Film	Date	Director	Country	Source work	Author	Date	Type
1	Hawaii	1966	George Roy Hill	USA	Hawaii	James Michener	1959	Novel

=== Mountain men ===
#	Film	Date	Director	Country	Source work	Author	Date	Type
1	Jeremiah Johnson	1972	Sydney Pollack	USA	Crow Killer: The Saga of Liver-Eating Johnson (uncredited)	Raymond Thorp & Robert Bunker	1969^{¤}	Non-fiction
1					Mountain Man (uncredited)	Vardis Fisher	1965	Novel

=== Mounties ===
#	Film	Date	Director	Country	Source work	Author	Date	Type
1	Clancy of the Mounted	1933	Ray Taylor	USA	"Clancy of the Mounted Police" from Ballads of a Cheechako	Robert W. Service	1909	Poem
2	Fighting Trooper	1934	Ray Taylor	USA	?	James Oliver Curwood	19??	Novel
3	Susannah of the Mounties	1939	William A. Seiter	USA	Susannah of the Mounties	Muriel Denison	1936	Novel
n	Jesuit Joe	1991	Olivier Austen	France	Jesuit Joe; Jésuite Joe	Hugo Pratt	1980	Bande dessinée

==== Twice filmed: Tiger Rose ====
#	Film	Date	Director	Country	Source work	Author	Date	Type
1	Tiger Rose	1923	Sidney Franklin	USA	Tiger Rose	Willard Mack & David Belasco	191?	Play

=== Outlaws ===
#	Film	Date	Director	Country	Source work	Author	Date	Type
1	The Great Train Robbery	1903	Edwin S. Porter	USA	The Great Train Robbery	Scott Marble	1896	Play
2	3:10 to Yuma	1957	Delmer Daves	USA	"Three-Ten to Yuma"	Elmore Leonard	1953	Story
3	Catlow	1971	Sam Wanamaker	USA	Catlow	Louis L'Amour	1963	Novel

=== Railroaders and railwaymen ===
(The USA has railroads. Canada has railways, as did the rest of the British Empire.)

#	Film	Date	Director	Country	Source work	Author	Date	Type
1	Union Pacific	1939	Cecil B. DeMille	USA	Trouble Shooter	Ernest Haycox	1936	Novel
2	The National Dream *	1974	Eric Till & James Murray	Canada	The National Dream	Pierre Berton	1970	Non-fiction
2					The Last Spike	Pierre Berton	1971	Non-fiction

- * TV miniseries.

=== Schoolmarms ===
==== Frequently filmed: The Rainmaker ====
#	Film	Date	Director	Country	Source work	Author	Date	Type
1	The Rainmaker ♠	1956	Joseph Anthony	USA	The Rainmaker	N. Richard Nash	1954	Play

- ♠ A spinster smart enough to be a schoolmarm falls for a con man.

=== Settlers and sodbusters ===
#	Film	Date	Director	Country	Source work	Author	Date	Type
1	Cimarron	1931	Wesley Ruggles	USA	Cimarron	Edna Ferber	1929	Novel

==== Outback ====
("The Never-Never", "the back of beyond", "the back of Bourke")

#	Film	Date	Director	Country	Source work	Author	Date	Type
1	We of the Never Never	1982	Igor Auzins	Australia	We of the Never Never	Mrs Aeneas Gunn	1908	Novel/Memoir

=== Sourdoughs and cheechakos ===
#	Film	Date	Director	Country	Source work	Author	Date	Type
1	The Shooting of Dan McGrew	1924	Clarence G. Badger	USA	"The Shooting of Dan McGrew" from The Songs of a Sourdough	Robert W. Service	1907	Poem
2	The Trail of '98	1928	Clarence Brown	USA	The Trail of Ninety-Eight, A Northland Romance	Robert W. Service	1910	Novel
3	Klondike Annie	1936	Raoul Walsh	USA	Frisco Kate	Mae West	1930	Play (unproduced)
4	Jack London	1943	Alfred Santell	USA	The Book of Jack London	Charmian London	1921	Biography
5	North to Alaska	1960	Henry Hathaway	USA	Birthday Gift	Ladislas Fodor	195?	Play

=== Telegraphers ===
#	Film	Date	Director	Country	Source work	Author	Date	Type
1	Western Union	1941	Fritz Lang	USA	Western Union	Zane Grey	1939	Novel

=== Temperance crusaders and teetotallers ===
#	Film	Date	Director	Country	Source work	Author	Date	Type
1	The Hallelujah Trail	1965	John Sturges	USA	Hallelujah Train	William Gulick	1963	Novel

=== Vigilantes ===
#	Film	Date	Director	Country	Source work	Author	Date	Type
1	The Ox-Bow Incident	1943	William A. Wellman	USA	The Ox-Bow Incident	Walter Van Tilburg Clark	1940	Novel

=== Whalers ===
#	Film	Date	Director	Country	Source work	Author	Date	Type
1	The White Dawn	1974	Philip Kaufman	USA	The White Dawn: An Eskimo Saga	James Houston	1971	Novel

== 20th century ==
=== Explorers ===
#	Film	Date	Director	Country	Source work	Author	Date	Type
1	The Journals of Knud Rasmussen	2006	Zacharias Kunuk	Canada & Denmark	Across Arctic America: Narrative of the Fifth Thule Expedition	Knud Rasmussen	1927	Memoir

=== Indians ===
#	Film	Date	Director	Country	Source work	Author	Date	Type
1	Lost in the Barrens *	1990	Michael Scott	Canada	Lost in the Barrens	Farley Mowat	1956	Children's novel

- * television film.

=== Individualists ===
#	Film	Date	Director	Country	Source work	Author	Date	Type
1	The Mosquito Coast	1986	Peter Weir	USA	The Mosquito Coast	Paul Theroux	1982	Novel
2	At Play in the Fields of the Lord	1991	Hector Babenco	USA	At Play in the Fields of the Lord	Peter Matthiessen	1965	Novel

=== Missionaries ===
#	Film	Date	Director	Country	Source work	Author	Date	Type
1	At Play in the Fields of the Lord	1991	Hector Babenco	USA	At Play in the Fields of the Lord	Peter Matthiessen	1965	Novel
2	The Other Side of Heaven	2001	Mitch Davis	USA	In the Eye of the Storm	John H. Groberg	19??	Memoir

=== Prospectors ===
#	Film	Date	Director	Country	Source work	Author	Date	Type
1	The Treasure of the Sierra Madre	1948	John Huston	USA	Der Schatz der Sierra Madre	"B. Traven"	1927	Novel

== See also ==
Pages with the same format

- List of films based on arts books
- List of films based on civics books
- List of films based on crime books
- List of films based on film books
- List of films based on sports books
- List of films based on spy books
- List of films based on war books

Return to top of page.
