= List of films based on arts books =

This is a list of films based on arts books.

== Architecture ==
=== Architects ===
Film	Date	Director	Country	Source work	Author	Date	Type	Basis
The Fountainhead	1949	King Vidor	US	The Fountainhead	Ayn Rand	1943	Novel	-

== Circus ==
=== Performers ===
Film	Date	Director	Country	Source work	Author	Date	Type	Basis
Dumbo α	1941	Ben Sharpsteen	US	Dumbo, The Flying Elephant	Helen Aberson	1939	Children's book	-
Horton Hatches the Egg α	1942	Robert Clampett	US	Horton Hatches the Egg	Dr. Seuss	1940	Children's book	-
The Man Who Laughs	1928	Paul Leni	US	The Man Who Laughs	Victor Hugo	1869	Novel	-

- α Animated film.

=== Carnies ===
Film	Date	Director	Country	Source work	Author	Date	Type	Basis
7 Faces of Dr. Lao	1964	George Pal	US	The Circus of Dr. Lao	Charles G. Finney	1935	Novel	-

== Dance ==
=== Dancers ===
Film	Date	Director	Country	Source work	Author	Date	Type	Basis
Nijinsky	1980	Herbert Ross	US	Life of Nijinsky	Romola Nijinsky	1934	Memoir	Vaslav Nijinsky

== Fine art ==
=== Painters ===
Film	Date	Director	Country	Source work	Author	Date	Type	Basis
Moulin Rouge	1952	John Huston	UK	Moulin Rouge	Pierre La Mure	1950	Novel	Henri de Toulouse-Lautrec
Lust for Life	1956	Vincente Minnelli	US	Lust for Life	Irving Stone	1934	Novel	Vincent van Gogh, Paul Gauguin
The Agony and the Ecstasy	1965	Carol Reed	US	The Agony and the Ecstasy	Irving Stone	1961	Novel	Michelangelo
Pollock	2000	Ed Harris	US	Jackson Pollock: An American Saga	Steven Naifeh & Gregory White Smith	1989	Biography	Jackson Pollock
Frida	2002	Julie Taymor	US	Frida: A Biography of Frida Kahlo	Hayden Herrera	1983	Biography	Frida Kahlo
Girl with a Pearl Earring	2003	Peter Webber	UK & Luxembourg	Girl with a Pearl Earring	Tracy Chevalier	1999	Novel	Jan Vermeer
Carrington	1995	Christopher Hampton	UK & France	Lytton Strachey: The New Biography	Michael Holroyd	1994	Biography	Dora Carrington
Goya – oder der arge Weg der Erkenntnis	1971	Konrad Wolf	East Germany & USSR	Goya oder der arge Weg der Erkenntnis	Lion Feuchtwanger	1951	Novel	Francisco Goya
Charlotte	2021	Éric Warin and Tahir Rana	Canada, Belgium & France	Life? or Theatre?	Charlotte Salomon	1981	Autobiography	Charlotte Salomon

=== Sculptors ===
Film	Date	Director	Country	Source work	Author	Date	Type	Basis
Camille Claudel	1988	Bruno Nuytten	France	?	Reine-Marie Paris	198?	Biography	Camille Claudel, Auguste Rodin
Savage Messiah	1972	Ken Russell	UK	Savage Messiah	H.S. Ede	1931	Biography	Henri Gaudier-Brzeska

=== Life models ===
Film	Date	Director	Country	Source work	Author	Date	Type	Basis
The Naked Civil Servant *	1975	Jack Gold	UK	The Naked Civil Servant	Quentin Crisp	1968	Autobiography	Quentin Crisp
Girl with a Pearl Earring	2003	Peter Webber	UK & Luxembourg	Girl with a Pearl Earring	Tracy Chevalier	1999	Novel	"Girl with a Pearl Earring" (incognita)

- * TV movie.

== Literature ==
=== Authors (fiction) ===
Film	Date	Director	Country	Source work	Author	Date	Type	Basis
Hemingway's Adventures of a Young Man	1962	Martin Ritt	US	Nick Adams stories	Ernest Hemingway	1920s	Stories	Ernest Hemingway
The Shining	1980	Stanley Kubrick	US	The Shining	Stephen King	1977	Novel	-
The Moderns	1988	Alan Rudolph	US	A Moveable Feast	Ernest Hemingway	1964 (posthumous)	Memoir	Ernest Hemingway, Gertrude Stein
Old Gringo	1989	Luis Puenzo	US	The Old Gringo	Carlos Fuentes	1985	Novel	Ambrose Bierce
Naked Lunch	1991	David Cronenberg	Canada, UK, Japan	Naked Lunch	William S. Burroughs	1959	Novel	William S. Burroughs
Hammett	1993	Wim Wenders	US	Hammett	Joe Gores	1975	Novel	Dashiell Hammett
In Love and War	1996	Richard Attenborough	US	Hemingway in Love and War	Henry S. Villard & James Nagel (editors)	1989 ^{¤}	Diary	Ernest Hemingway
Hamsun	1996	Jan Troell	Germany, Norway, Sweden, Denmark	Processen mod Hamsun	Thorkild Hansen	1978	Non-fiction	Knut Hamsun
Hamsun	1996	Jan Troell	Germany, Norway, Sweden, Denmark	Regnbuen	Marie Hamsun	1953	Autobiography	Knut Hamsun
Misery	1990	Rob Reiner	US	Misery	Stephen King	1987	Novel	-
Children of the Century	1999	Diane Kurys	France	The Confession of a Child of the Century	Alfred de Musset	1836	Novel/ Memoir	George Sand, Alfred de Musset
Secret Window	2004	David Koepp	US	Secret Window, Secret Garden	Stephen King	1990	Novella	Stephen King (simulacrum)
Capote	2005	Bennett Miller	US	Capote	Gerald Clarke	1988	Biography	Truman Capote, Harper Lee
Infamous	2006	Douglas McGrath	US	Capote: In Which Various Friends, Enemies, Acquaintances and Detractors Recall His Turbulent Career	George Plimpton	1997	Biography	Truman Capote, Harper Lee
Miss Potter	2006	Chris Noonan	UK	The Tale of Peter Rabbit	Beatrix Potter	1901/ 1902	Children's book	Beatrix Potter
Daphne *	2007	Clare Beavan	UK	Daphne du Maurier: The Secret Life of the Renowned Storyteller	Margaret Forster	1993	Biography	Daphne du Maurier
The Hours	2002	Stephen Daldry	US & UK	The Hours	Michael Cunningham	1998	Novel	Virginia Woolf

- * TV movie.

=== Authors (non-fiction) ===
Film	Date	Director	Country	Source work	Author	Date	Type	Basis
Paper Lion	1968	Alex March	US	Paper Lion	George Plimpton	1967	Memoir	George Plimpton
Reds	1981	Warren Beatty	US	Ten Days that Shook the World (uncredited)	John Reed (uncredited)	1919	Memoir	John Reed
Stealing Heaven	1988	Clive Donner	UK ?	Stealing Heaven	Marion Meade	1979	Novel	Peter Abelard
Regeneration	1997	Gillies MacKinnon	UK & Canada	Regeneration	Pat Barker	1991	Novel	Siegfried Sassoon, Robert Graves ♠
Passage †	2008	John Walker	Canada	Fatal Passage	Ken McGoogan	2001	Non-fiction	Charles Dickens
Carrington	1995	Christopher Hampton	UK & France	Lytton Strachey: The New Biography	Michael Holroyd	1994	Biography	Lytton Strachey
Out of Africa	1985	Sydney Pollack	US	Out of Africa	Isak Dinesen	1937	Memoir	Isak Dinesen ♠

- ♠ Certain authors have written well-known fiction, in addition to their non-fiction.
- † Dramatized documentary.

=== Authors (ghostwriting) ===
Film	Date	Director	Country	Source work	Author	Date	Type	Basis
Winchell *	1998	Paul Mazursky	US	Winchell: His Life and Times	Herman Klurfeld	1976	Non-fiction	Herman Klurfeld
The Ghost Writer	2010	Roman Polanski	France, Germany, UK	The Ghost	Robert Harris	2007	Novel	-
The Front	1976	Martin Ritt	US	Inside Out: A Memoir of the Blacklist (uncredited)	Walter Bernstein	1996	Memoir	Hollywood blacklist

- * TV movie.

=== Authors (forgery) ===
Film	Date	Director	Country	Source work	Author	Date	Type	Basis
The Hoax	2006	Lasse Hallström	US	The Hoax	Clifford Irving	1981	Non-fiction	Clifford Irving

=== Playwrights ===
Film	Date	Director	Country	Source work	Author	Date	Type	Basis
Reds	1981	Warren Beatty	US	Ten Days that Shook the World (uncredited)	John Reed (uncredited)	1919	Non-fiction/ Memoir	Eugene O'Neill
Wilde	1997	Brian Gilbert	UK	Oscar Wilde	Richard Ellmann	1989	Biography	Oscar Wilde
En compagnie d'Antonin Artaud	1993	Gérard Mordillat	France	En compagnie d'Antonin Artaud	Jacques Prevel	1974	Journal/ Memoir	Antonin Artaud
The Trials of Oscar Wilde	1960	Ken Hughes	UK	The Stringed Lute	John Furnell	1955	Play	Oscar Wilde
The Trials of Oscar Wilde	1960	Ken Hughes	UK	Famous Trials: Oscar Wilde	Montgomery Hyde	1948	Non-fiction	Oscar Wilde

=== Poets ===
Film	Date	Director	Country	Source work	Author	Date	Type	Basis
Beautiful Dreamers	1990	John Kent Harrison	Canada	Walt Whitman	Maurice Bucke	1883	Biography	Walt Whitman
Regeneration	1997	Gillies MacKinnon	UK & Canada	Regeneration	Pat Barker	1991	Novel	Wilfred Owen
Bright Star	2009	Jane Campion	UK, Australia, France	Keats (uncredited)	Andrew Motion	1998	Biography	John Keats
In My Country	2004	John Boorman	UK ?	Country of My Skull	Antjie Krog	1998	Memoir	Antjie Krog
Hedd Wyn	1992	Paul Turner	Wales	Yr Arwr	Hedd Wyn	1917	Poem	Hedd Wyn

=== Scriptwriters ===
(radio drama)

Film	Date	Director	Country	Source work	Author	Date	Type	Basis
Tune In Tomorrow	1990	John Amiel	US	Aunt Julia and the Scriptwriter	Mario Vargas Llosa	1977	Novel/ Memoir	Mario Vargas Llosa (simulacrum)

=== Publishers ===
(books and magazines)

Film	Date	Director	Country	Source work	Author	Date	Type	Basis
Bright Lights, Big City	1988	James Bridges	US	Bright Lights, Big City	Jay McInerney	1984	Novel	-
The Devil Wears Prada	2006	David Frankel	US	The Devil Wears Prada	Lauren Weisberger	2003	Novel	Anna Wintour (simulacrum)

=== Readers ===
Film	Date	Director	Country	Source work	Author	Date	Type	Basis
The Jane Austen Book Club	2007	Robin Swicord	US	The Jane Austen Book Club	Karen Joy Fowler	2004	Novel	Jane Austen (œuvre)
Misery	1990	Rob Reiner	US	Misery	Stephen King	1987	Novel	-
The Hours	2002	Stephen Daldry	US & UK	The Hours	Michael Cunningham	1998	Novel	Virginia Woolf (œuvre)

=== Bibliophiles ===
Film	Date	Director	Country	Source work	Author	Date	Type	Basis
The Ninth Gate	1999	Roman Polanski	Portugal, Spain, France, US	The Club Dumas	Arturo Pérez-Reverte	1993	Novel	-

== Magic ==
=== Magicians ===
Film	Date	Director	Country	Source work	Author	Date	Type	Basis
Houdini	1953	George Marshall	US	Houdini: His Life Story	Harold Kellock	1928	Non-fiction	Harry Houdini

== Music ==
=== Composers ===
Film	Date	Director	Country	Source work	Author	Date	Type	Basis
Voices from a Locked Room	1995	Malcolm Clarke	UK & US	Double Jeopardy	Mark A. Stuart	198?	Novel ?	Peter Warlock
Amadeus	1984	Miloš Forman	US	Amadeus	Peter Shaffer	1979	Play	W. A. Mozart, Antonio Salieri

=== Conductors ===
Film	Date	Director	Country	Source work	Author	Date	Type	Basis
Taking Sides	2001	István Szabó	France, UK, Germany, Austria	Taking Sides	Ronald Harwood	1995	Play	Wilhelm Furtwängler
Taking Sides	2001	István Szabó	France, UK, Germany, Austria	? (uncredited)	Wilhelm Furtwängler (uncredited)	194?	Diary	Wilhelm Furtwängler
Voices from a Locked Room	1995	Malcolm Clarke	UK & US	Double Jeopardy	Mark A. Stuart	198?	Novel ?	Thomas Beecham

=== Songwriters ===
Film	Date	Director	Country	Source work	Author	Date	Type	Basis
Bound for Glory	1976	Hal Ashby	US	Bound for Glory	Woody Guthrie	1943	Autobiography	Woody Guthrie
The Buddy Holly Story	1978	Steve Rash	US	Buddy Holly: His Life and Music	John Goldrosen	1975	Non-fiction	Buddy Holly
Great Balls of Fire!	1989	Jim McBride	US	Great Balls of Fire: The Uncensored Story of Jerry Lee Lewis	Myra Lewis with Murray M. Silver, Jr.	1982	Autobiography	Jerry Lee Lewis
The Doors	1991	Oliver Stone	US	notes (unpublished) for No One Here Gets Out Alive (uncredited)	Jerry Hopkins & Danny Sugerman (both uncredited)	1980	Non-fiction	Jim Morrison, The Doors
The Doors	1991	Oliver Stone	US	Riders On The Storm: My Life With Jim Morrison and the Doors (uncredited)	John Densmore (uncredited)	1990	Memoir	John Densmore, Jim Morrison, The Doors
The Doors	1991	Oliver Stone	US	Illustrated History of the Doors (uncredited)	Danny Sugerman (uncredited)	1983	Non-fiction	Jim Morrison, The Doors
Whale Music	1994	Richard J. Lewis	Canada	Whale Music	Paul Quarrington	1989	Novel	Brian Wilson (simulacrum)
Stoned	2005	Stephen Woolley	UK	The Murder of Brian Jones	Anna Wohlin	198?	Non-fiction	Brian Jones
Walk the Line	2005	James Mangold	US	Cash: The Autobiography	Johnny Cash with Patrick Carr	1997	Autobiography	Johnny Cash, June Carter
Walk the Line	2005	James Mangold	US	Man in Black: His Own Story in His Own Words	Johnny Cash	1975	Autobiography	Johnny Cash, June Carter
Amazing Grace	2006	Michael Apted	UK & US	"Amazing Grace"	John Newton	1779	Hymn	John Newton
The Mambo Kings	1992	Arne Glimcher	US	The Mambo Kings Play Songs of Love	Oscar Hijuelos	1989	Novel	-
Crazy Heart	2009	Scott Cooper	US	Crazy Heart	Thomas Cobb	1987	Novel	Jennings, Kristofferson, Haggard, Thompson (composite simulacrum)

=== Singers ===
Film	Date	Director	Country	Source work	Author	Date	Type	Basis
Lady Sings the Blues	1972	Sidney J. Furie	US	Lady Sings the Blues	Billie Holiday with William Dufty	1956	Autobiography	Billie Holiday

=== Instrumentalists ===
Film	Date	Director	Country	Source work	Author	Date	Type	Basis
Hilary and Jackie	1998	Anand Tucker	UK	A Genius in the Family	Piers du Pré & Hilary du Pré	1997	Memoir	Jacqueline du Pré, Daniel Barenboim
Young Man with a Horn	1950	Michael Curtiz	US	Young Man with a Horn	Dorothy Baker	1938	Novel	Bix Beiderbecke (simulacrum)

== Radio ==
=== Performers ===
Film	Date	Director	Country	Source work	Author	Date	Type	Basis
Talk Radio	1988	Oliver Stone	US	Talked to Death: The Life and Murder of Alan Berg	Stephen Singular	1987	Non-fiction	

== Stage ==
=== Burlesque ===
Film	Date	Director	Country	Source work	Author	Date	Type	Basis
The Night They Raided Minsky's	1968	William Friedkin	US	The Night They Raided Minsky's	Rowland Barber	1960	Novel	Minsky's Burlesque
Applause	1929	Rouben Mamoulian	US	Applause	Beth Brown	1928	Novel	-

=== Cabaret ===
Film	Date	Director	Country	Source work	Author	Date	Type	Basis
Moulin Rouge	1952	John Huston	UK	Moulin Rouge	Pierre La Mure	1950	Novel	Moulin Rouge

=== Theatre ===
==== Actors and actresses ====
Film	Date	Director	Country	Source work	Author	Date	Type	Basis
Daphne *	2007	Clare Beavan	UK	Daphne du Maurier: The Secret Life of the Renowned Storyteller	Margaret Forster	1993	Biography	Gertrude Lawrence

==== Stage directors ====
Film	Date	Director	Country	Source work	Author	Date	Type	Basis
En compagnie d'Antonin Artaud	1993	Gérard Mordillat	France	En compagnie d'Antonin Artaud	Jacques Prevel	1974	Journal/ Memoir	Antonin Artaud

== Visual arts ==
=== Photographers ===
Film	Date	Director	Country	Source work	Author	Date	Type	Basis
The Bridges of Madison County	1995	Clint Eastwood	US	The Bridges of Madison County aka Love in Black and White	Robert James Waller	1992	Novel	-

== See also ==
- List of biographical films
- List of fiction works made into feature films
- List of non-fiction works made into feature films
- List of films based on civics books
- List of films based on crime books
- List of films based on sports books
- List of films based on spy books
- List of films based on westerns
