= List of films based on civics books =

A list of films that are based on books about common topics and issues in social science and political science.

== Addiction ==
=== Alcoholism ===
==== India ====
Film	Date	Director	Country	Source work	Author	Date	Type	Basis
Devdas देवदास	1936	P.C. Barua	India	Devdas	Sharat Chandra Chattopadhyay শরৎচন্দ্র চট্টোপাধ্যায়	1917	Novella	-

==== Mexico ====
Film	Date	Director	Country	Source work	Author	Date	Type	Basis
Under the Volcano ♠	1984	John Huston	USA	Under the Volcano	Malcolm Lowry	1947	Novel	-

- ♠ The subject is the British consul in a Mexican town (based on Cuernavaca).

==== United States ====
Film	Date	Director	Country	Source work	Author	Date	Type	Basis
The Lost Weekend	1945	Billy Wilder	USA	The Lost Weekend	Charles Jackson	1944	Novel	-
Leaving Las Vegas	1995	Mike Figgis	USA	Leaving Las Vegas	John O'Brien	1990	Novel/ Memoir	John O'Brien (simulacrum)
The Doors	1991	Oliver Stone	USA	notes (unpublished) for No One Here Gets Out Alive (uncredited)	Jerry Hopkins & Danny Sugerman (both uncredited)	1980	Non-fiction	Jim Morrison

=== Drug addiction ===
==== Germany ====
Film	Date	Director	Country	Source work	Author	Date	Type	Basis
Christiane F.	1981	Uli Edel	West Germany	Zoo Station: The Story of Christiane F. ♠	Christiane F. with Kai Herrmann & Horst Rieck (ghostwriters)	197?	Non-fiction	Christiane F.

- ♠ The German book title translates literally as Christiane F. – We Children from the Zoo Station.

==== United Kingdom ====
Film	Date	Director	Country	Source work	Author	Date	Type	Basis
Trainspotting	1996	Danny Boyle	UK	Trainspotting	Irvine Welsh	1993	Novel	-
The Seven Percent Solution	1976	Herbert Ross	UK & USA	The Seven-Per-Cent Solution: Being a Reprint from the Reminiscences of John H. Watson, M.D.	Nicholas Meyer	1974	Novel	Sherlock Holmes

==== United States ====
Film	Date	Director	Country	Source work	Author	Date	Type	Basis
The Boost	1988	Harold Becker	USA	Ludes	Ben Stein	1982	Novel	-
The Basketball Diaries	1995	Scott Kalvert	USA	The Basketball Diaries	Jim Carroll	1978	Diary	Jim Carroll
Permanent Midnight	1998	David Veloz	USA	Permanent Midnight	Jerry Stahl	1995	Memoir	Jerry Stahl

=== Sex addiction ===
==== United States ====
Film	Date	Director	Country	Source work	Author	Date	Type	Basis
Auto Focus	2002	Paul Schrader	USA	The Murder of Bob Crane: Who Killed the Star of Hogan's Heroes?	Robert Graysmith	199?	Biography	Bob Crane

== Civil rights ==
=== South Africa ===
Film	Date	Director	Country	Source work	Author	Date	Type	Basis
Cry Freedom	1987	Richard Attenborough	UK	Biko	Donald Woods	1978	Memoir	Steve Biko, Donald Woods
In My Country	2004	John Boorman	UK ?	Country of My Skull	Antjie Krog	1998	Memoir	-
Goodbye Bafana aka The Color of Freedom	2007	Bille August	UK, South Africa, Germany	Goodbye Bafana: Nelson Mandela, My Prisoner, My Friend	James Gregory & Bob Graham	199?	Memoir	Nelson Mandela

=== United States ===
For slave revolts, see List of films based on war books — 1775–1898.

Film	Date	Director	Country	Source work	Author	Date	Type	Basis
Boycott *	2001	Clark Johnson	USA	Daybreak of Freedom: the Montgomery Bus Boycott	Stewart Burns (editor)	1997 ^{¤}	Non-fiction	Martin Luther King Jr., Ralph Abernathy, Rosa Parks
Attack on Terror: The FBI vs. the Ku Klux Klan *	1975	Marvin J. Chomsky	USA	Attack on Terror: The F.B.I. Against the Ku Klux Klan in Mississippi	Don Whitehead	1970	Non-fiction	Michael Schwerner, James Chaney, Andrew Goodman

- * TV movie.
- ** TV miniseries.

== Journalism ==
(Print and television)

=== Reporters ===
Film	Date	Director	Country	Source work	Author	Date	Type	Basis
Culloden ♠ *	1964	Peter Watkins	UK	Culloden	John Prebble	1962	Non-fiction	-
All the President's Men	1976	Alan J. Pakula	USA	All the President's Men	Carl Bernstein & Bob Woodward	1974	Memoir	Bob Woodward, Carl Bernstein

- ♠ A television reporter broadcasts live from the 1746 Battle of Culloden.
- * TV movie.

=== Editors ===
Film	Date	Director	Country	Source work	Author	Date	Type	Basis
All the President's Men	1976	Alan J. Pakula	USA	All the President's Men	Carl Bernstein & Bob Woodward	1974	Memoir	Ben Bradlee

=== Publishers ===
Film	Date	Director	Country	Source work	Author	Date	Type	Basis
All the President's Men	1976	Alan J. Pakula	USA	All the President's Men	Carl Bernstein & Bob Woodward	1974	Memoir	Katharine Graham ♠

- ♠ Mrs. Graham is often mentioned but not dramatized.

== Labour ==
=== Belgium ===
Film	Date	Director	Country	Source work	Author	Date	Type	Basis
Daens	1992	Stijn Coninx	Belgium, France, Netherlands	Pieter Daens	Louis Paul Boon	1971	Novel	Adolf Daens

=== United States ===
==== Agriculture ====
Film	Date	Director	Country	Source work	Author	Date	Type	Basis
The Grapes of Wrath	1940	John Ford	USA	The Grapes of Wrath	John Steinbeck	1939	Novel	Okies
Mr. Majestyk	1974	Richard Fleischer	USA	Mr. Majestyk	Elmore Leonard	1974	Novel	-

==== Manufacturing ====
Film	Date	Director	Country	Source work	Author	Date	Type	Basis
The Triangle Factory Fire Scandal *	1979	Mel Stuart	USA	The Triangle Fire (unofficial)	Leon Stein (unofficial)	1962	Non-fiction	Triangle Shirtwaist

- * TV movie.

==== Mining ====
Film	Date	Director	Country	Source work	Author	Date	Type	Basis
North Country	2005	Niki Caro	USA	Class Action: The Story of Lois Jenson and the Landmark Case That Changed Sexual Harassment Law	Clara Bingham & Laura Leedy Gansler	196?	Non-fiction	Lois Jenson
One of the Hollywood Ten	2000	Karl Francis	Spain & UK	Salt of the Earth: The Story of a Film	Herbert Biberman	1965	Non-fiction	Salt of the Earth

==== Sports ====
Film	Date	Director	Country	Source work	Author	Date	Type	Basis
Eight Men Out	1988	John Sayles	USA	8 Men Out	Eliot Asinof	1963	Non-fiction	Black Sox
Net Worth ♠ *	1995	Jerry Ciccoritti	Canada	Net Worth: Exploding the Myth of Pro Hockey	David Cruise & Alison Griffiths	1991	Non-fiction	

- ♠ The hockey players in the wage dispute are Canadian; the club owners are American.
- * TV movie.

== Mental disorder ==
=== 19th century ===
==== Canada ====
Film	Date	Director	Country	Source work	Author	Date	Type	Basis
Beautiful Dreamers	1990	John Kent Harrison	Canada	Walt Whitman	Dr. Maurice Bucke	1883	Biography	insane asylum

20th century

=== United States ===
Film	Date	Director	Country	Source work	Author	Date	Type	Basis
Frances	1982	Graeme Clifford	USA	Shadowland	William Arnold	198?	Fictional biography	Frances Farmer, lobotomy
Mister Buddwing	1966	Delbert Mann	USA	Buddwing	Evan Hunter	1964	Novel	amnesia

== Native issues ==
=== Australia ===
Film	Date	Director	Country	Source work	Author	Date	Type	Basis
Rabbit-Proof Fence	2002	Phillip Noyce	Australia	Follow the Rabbit-Proof Fence	Doris Pilkington Garimara	1996	Non-fiction	Molly Craig

=== United States ===
Film	Date	Director	Country	Source work	Author	Date	Type	Basis
The Outsider ♠	1961	Delbert Mann	USA	"The Outsider" from Wolf Whistle and Other Stories	William Bradford Huie	1959	Non-fiction	Ira Hayes

- ♠ The story of Ira Hayes was also told in Flags of Our Fathers.

== Penology ==
=== Roman Empire ===
Film	Date	Director	Country	Source work	Author	Date	Type	Basis
Barabbas	1961	Richard Fleischer	Italy	Barabbas	Pär Lagerkvist	1950	Novel	Barabbas

=== Brazil ===
Film	Date	Director	Country	Source work	Author	Date	Type	Basis
Carandiru; Carandiru	2003	Hector Babenco	Brazil & Argentina	Carandiru Station; Estação Carandiru	Dr. Dráuzio Varella	1999	Non-fiction/ Memoir	Carandiru massacre

=== France ===
Film	Date	Director	Country	Source work	Author	Date	Type	Basis
Papillon	1973	Franklin J. Schaffner	USA	Papillon	Henri Charrière	1969	Memoir/ Novel	Henri Charrière

=== South Africa ===
Film	Date	Director	Country	Source work	Author	Date	Type	Basis
Goodbye Bafana aka The Color of Freedom	2007	Bille August	UK, South Africa, Germany	Goodbye Bafana: Nelson Mandela, My Prisoner, My Friend	James Gregory & Bob Graham	199?	Memoir	Nelson Mandela

=== United Kingdom ===
Film	Date	Director	Country	Source work	Author	Date	Type	Basis
Boy A	2007	John Crowley	UK	Boy A	Jonathan Trigell	2004	Novel	-
A Clockwork Orange	1971	Stanley Kubrick	UK	A Clockwork Orange ♠	Anthony Burgess	1962	Novel	-

- ♠ The earliest editions of the novel did not contain a glossary, or any indication that the slang was based on Russian.

==== Capital punishment ====
Film	Date	Director	Country	Source work	Author	Date	Type	Basis
Pierrepoint	1995	Adrian Shergold	UK	Executioner: Pierrepoint	Albert Pierrepoint	1974	Memoir	Albert Pierrepoint

=== United States ===
Film	Date	Director	Country	Source work	Author	Date	Type	Basis
Birdman of Alcatraz	1962	John Frankenheimer	USA	Birdman of Alcatraz	Thomas E. Gaddis	1955	Non-fiction	Robert Stroud
I Am a Fugitive from a Chain Gang	1932	Mervyn LeRoy	USA	I Am a Fugitive from a Georgia Chain Gang	Robert Elliott Burns	1932	Autobiography	Robert Elliott Burns

==== Capital punishment ====
Film	Date	Director	Country	Source work	Author	Date	Type	Basis
The Executioner's Song *	1982	Lawrence Schiller	USA	The Executioner's Song	Norman Mailer	1980	Novel	Gary Gilmore
Shot in the Heart *	2001	Agnieszka Holland	USA	Shot in the Heart	Mikal Gilmore	1995	Non-fiction	Gary Gilmore

- * TV movie.

=== USSR ===
Film	Date	Director	Country	Source work	Author	Date	Type	Basis
One Day in the Life of Ivan Denisovich	1970	Caspar Wrede	UK & Norway	One Day in the Life of Ivan Denisovich	Aleksandr Solzhenitsyn	1962	Novel	-

== Political prisoners ==
=== Greece ===
Film	Date	Director	Country	Source work	Author	Date	Type	Basis
Cell No. 5 ♠ To kelli miden ×	1975	Yannis Smaragdis	Greece	The Method: A Personal Account of the Tortures in Greece; Ανθρωποφύλακες (Anthropofylakes)	Periklis Korovesis; Περικλής Κοροβέσης	1969	Memoir	Periklis Korovesis

- ♠ The film concerns torture during the period of the colonels.

=== South Africa ===
Film	Date	Director	Country	Source work	Author	Date	Type	Basis
Goodbye Bafana aka The Color of Freedom	2007	Bille August	UK, South Africa, Germany	Goodbye Bafana: Nelson Mandela, My Prisoner, My Friend	James Gregory & Bob Graham	199?	Memoir	Nelson Mandela

== Poverty ==
=== Brazil ===
Film	Date	Director	Country	Source work	Author	Date	Type	Basis
Vidas Secas	1963	Nelson Pereira dos Santos	Brazil	Vidas Secas	Graciliano Ramos	1938	Novel	sertão

=== United Kingdom ===
Film	Date	Director	Country	Source work	Author	Date	Type	Basis
Broken Blossoms	1919	D. W. Griffith	USA	"The Chink and the Child" from Limehouse Nights	Thomas Burke	1916	Story	Limehouse
Love on the Dole	1941	John Baxter	UK	Love on the Dole: a Tale of Two Cities	Walter Greenwood	1933	Novel	Salford

=== United States ===
==== Urban ====
Film	Date	Director	Country	Source work	Author	Date	Type	Basis
A Tree Grows In Brooklyn	1945	Elia Kazan	USA	A Tree Grows In Brooklyn	Betty Smith	1943	Novel	Brooklyn
Last Exit to Brooklyn	1989	Uli Edel	USA, UK, West Germany	Last Exit to Brooklyn	Hubert Selby Jr.	1964	Novel	Brooklyn

==== Rural ====
Film	Date	Director	Country	Source work	Author	Date	Type	Basis
Beggars of Life	1928	William A. Wellman	USA	Beggars of Life	Jim Tully	1924	Novel	hobos
The Grapes of Wrath	1940	John Ford	USA	The Grapes of Wrath	John Steinbeck	1939	Novel	Okies
Sounder	1972	Martin Ritt	USA	Sounder	William H. Armstrong	1969	Novel	sharecroppers
Conrack	1974	Martin Ritt	USA	The Water Is Wide	Pat Conroy	1972	Memoir	Sea Islands

== See also ==
- List of fiction works made into feature films
- List of non-fiction works made into feature films
- List of biographical films

Pages with the same format

- List of films based on arts books
- List of films based on crime books
- List of films based on film books
- List of films based on sports books
- List of films based on spy books
- List of films based on war books
- List of films based on westerns
