= List of films based on film books =

This is a list of films that are based on books about films and television.

== Directors and producers ==
#	Film	Date	Director	Country	Source work	Author	Date	Type	Basis
1	The Stunt Man	1980	Richard Rush	USA	The Stunt Man	Paul Brodeur	1970 ^{¤}	Novel	-
2	White Hunter Black Heart	1990	Clint Eastwood	USA	White Hunter Black Heart	Peter Viertel	1953	Novel	John Huston (simulacrum)
3	My Father's Glory	1990	Yves Robert	France	La Gloire de mon père	Marcel Pagnol	1957	Novel/ Memoir	Marcel Pagnol
4	My Mother's Castle	1990	Yves Robert	France	Le Château de ma mère & Le Temps des secrets	Marcel Pagnol	1957 & 1959	Novels/ Memoirs	Marcel Pagnol
5	Gods and Monsters	1998	Bill Condon	USA	Father of Frankenstein	Christopher Bram	1995	Novel	James Whale
6	One of the Hollywood Ten	2000	Karl Francis	Spain & UK	Salt of the Earth: The Story of a Film	Herbert Biberman	1965	Non-fiction	Herbert Biberman
7	The Aviator	2004	Martin Scorsese	USA	Howard Hughes: The Secret Life	Charles Higham	1993	Biography	Howard Hughes
8	What Just Happened	2008	Barry Levinson	USA	What Just Happened? Bitter Hollywood Tales from the Front Line	Art Linson	200?	Memoir	-
n	Life with Judy Garland: Me and My Shadows **	2001	Robert Allan Ackerman	Canada & USA	Me and My Shadows: A Family Memoir	Lorna Luft	1998	Memoir	Vincente Minnelli

- ** TV miniseries.

=== Screenwriters ===
Film	Date	Director	Country	Source work	Author	Date	Type	Basis
Permanent Midnight	1998	David Veloz	USA	Permanent Midnight	Jerry Stahl	1995	Memoir	Jerry Stahl

=== Actresses ===
Film	Date	Director	Country	Source work	Author	Date	Type	Basis
Mommie Dearest	1981	Frank Perry	USA	Mommie Dearest	Christina Crawford	1978	Memoir	Joan Crawford
Frances	1982	Graeme Clifford	USA	Shadowland	William Arnold	198?	"Fictional biography"	Frances Farmer
Summer of Aviya	1988	Eli Cohen	Israel	Summer of Aviya	Gila Almagor	197?	Novel/ Memoir	Gila Almagor (simulacrum)
The Aviator	2004	Martin Scorsese	USA	Howard Hughes: The Secret Life	Charles Higham	1993	Biography	Katharine Hepburn, Ava Gardner
The Life and Death of Peter Sellers	2004	Stephen Hopkins	UK & USA	The Life and Death of Peter Sellers	Roger Lewis	1995	Biography	Britt Ekland
Life with Judy Garland: Me and My Shadows **	2001	Robert Allan Ackerman	Canada & USA	Me and My Shadows: A Family Memoir	Lorna Luft	1998	Memoir	Judy Garland

- ** TV miniseries.

=== Actors ===
#	Film	Date	Director	Country	Source work	Author	Date	Type	Basis
1	Swimming to Cambodia	1987	Jonathan Demme	USA	Swimming to Cambodia	Spalding Gray	1985	Monologue/ Memoir	Spalding Gray
2	Auto Focus	2002	Paul Schrader	USA	The Murder of Bob Crane: Who Killed the Star of Hogan's Heroes?	Robert Graysmith	1993	Biography	Bob Crane
3	The Life and Death of Peter Sellers	2004	Stephen Hopkins	UK & USA	The Life and Death of Peter Sellers	Roger Lewis	1995	Biography	Peter Sellers

=== Stuntmen ===
#	Film	Date	Director	Country	Source work	Author	Date	Type	Basis
1	The Stunt Man	1980	Richard Rush	USA	The Stunt Man	Paul Brodeur	1970	Novel	-

=== Interviewers, newsreaders, hosts ===
#	Film	Date	Director	Country	Source work	Author	Date	Type	Basis
1	Frost/Nixon	2008	Ron Howard	USA	Frost/Nixon	Peter Morgan	2006	Play	David Frost

=== Columnists and publicists ===
#	Film	Date	Director	Country	Source work	Author	Date	Type	Basis
1	Winchell *	1998	Paul Mazursky	USA	Winchell: His Life and Times	Herman Klurfeld	1976	Non-fiction	Walter Winchell

- * TV movie.

=== Exhibitors ===
#	Film	Date	Director	Country	Source work	Author	Date	Type	Basis
1	The Last Picture Show	1971	Peter Bogdanovich	USA	The Last Picture Show	Larry McMurtry	1966	Novel	-

== See also ==
Pages with the same format

- List of films based on arts books
- List of films based on civics books
- List of films based on crime books
- List of films based on sports books
- List of films based on spy books
- List of films based on war books
- List of films based on westerns

Return to top of page.
