= Prevel =

Prevel or Prével is a French surname. Notable people with the surname include:

- Jacques Prevel (1915–1951), French poet
- Louis Prével (1879–1964), French rower
