= My Life and Times with Antonin Artaud =

- Directed by: Gérard Mordillat
- Written by: Gérard Mordillat; Jérôme Prieur
- Based on: En compagnie d'Antonin Artaud (1974) by Jacques Prevel
- Produced by: Denis Freyd
- Starring: Sami Frey; Marc Barbé
- Cinematography: François Catonné
- Edited by: Sophie Rouffio
- Music by: Jean-Claude Petit
- Distributed by: Leisure Time Features
- Release date: February 23, 1993 (France)
- Running time: 90 minutes
- Country: France
- Language: French

My Life and Times with Antonin Artaud (French: En compagnie d'Antonin Artaud) is a 1993 French film, directed by Gérard Mordillat. It is based on Jacques Prevel's 1974 novel of the same name. It follows Prevel's journal of a two-year friendship with Antonin Artaud until his death in 1948

== Plot ==
After nine years of being locked up, Antonin Artaud (Sami Frey) is released from the asylum at Rodez, and returns to Paris with his friends. One of his friends, Jacques Prevel (Marc Barbé) is a young poet, and follows Artaud in his wanders between the nursing home at Ivry and Saint Germain-des-Prés, while pursuing the same quest for poetry, drugs, and the absolute. Prevel becomes a disciple, pusher, and companion toward Artaud, whose story he relates in a chronicle that leads up to his death two years later. In post-war Paris where he lives sometimes in misery and suffering, Prevel shares his life between two women, Rolande (Valérie Jeannet) and Jany (Julie Jézéquel), while at the same time continuing his attachment to Antonin Artaud, the man who is his only friend.

== Cast ==
- Sami Frey : Antonin Artaud
- Marc Barbé : Jacques Prevel
- Julie Jézéquel : Jany
- Valérie Jeannet : Rolande Prevel
- Clotilde de Bayser : Marthe Robert
- Charlotte Valandrey : Colette Thomas

== Awards ==
Award	Category	Nominee	Result
Biarritz International Festival of Audiovisual Programming	Fiction: Actor	Sami Frey	Won
Namur International Festival of French-Speaking Film	Best Actor	Sami Frey	Won
Namur International Festival of French-Speaking Film	Best Artistic Contribution	Gérard Mordillat	Won

== Reception ==
Rotten Tomatoes gave the film a rating of 83% from 6 reviews and an average rating of 6.9/10.

Emanuel Levy from Variety Film Reviews praised Sami Frey's performance in the film "Sami Frey gives such an astonishingly intense performance that his portrait of the genius and madness of the famed French poet/intellectual is far more insightful than that offered in the current documentary"

Washington Post also praises Frey's spectacular performance, comparing him to Marlon Brando
