= List of films based on crime books =

This is a list of films that are based on books about crime. Films are listed according to the decade in which the depicted crime occurred, rather than by the film's date of release.

This page includes "crimes" where the "criminal" was later exonerated. This page includes suicides or other deaths which have been deemed to be suspicious by some and have therefore become the subject of conspiracy theories.

== 12th century ==
=== England ===
==== Frequently filmed: A Morbid Taste for Bones and sequels ====
#	Film	Date	Director	Country	Source work	Author	Date	Type
1	One Corpse Too Many *	1994	?	UK	One Corpse Too Many	"Ellis Peters"	1979	Novel

- * TV movie

=== Japan ===
#	Film	Date	Director	Country	Source work	Author	Date	Type
1	Rashomon 羅生門	1950	Akira Kurosawa	Japan	"In a Grove"	Ryūnosuke Akutagawa	1922	Story

== 14th century ==
=== Italy ===
#	Film	Date	Director	Country	Source work	Author	Date	Type
1	The Name of the Rose	1986	Jean-Jacques Annaud	Germany, France, Italy	The Name of the Rose; Il nome della rosa	Umberto Eco	1980	Novel

== 16th century ==
=== England ===
==== Anne Boleyn adultery and treason ====
1536

==== Thomas More case ====
#	Film	Date	Director	Country	Source work	Author	Date	Type
1	A Man for All Seasons	1966	Fred Zinnemann	UK	A Man for All Seasons	Robert Bolt	1960	Play

== 17th century ==
=== United States ===
==== Frequently filmed: The Scarlet Letter ====
#	Film	Date	Director	Country	Source work	Author	Date	Type
n	The Scarlet Letter	1926	Victor Sjöström	USA	The Scarlet Letter	Nathaniel Hawthorne	1850	Novel

==== Salem witch trials ====
1692–1693

===== Frequently filmed: The Crucible =====
#	Film	Date	Director	Country	Source work	Author	Date	Type
1	Les Sorcières de Salem ♠	1957	Raymond Rouleau	France & East Germany	The Crucible	Arthur Miller	1953	Play
2	The Crucible	1996	Nicholas Hytner	USA	The Crucible	Arthur Miller	1953	Play

- ♠ The Witches of Salem has an adapted screenplay by Jean-Paul Sartre.

== 18th century ==
=== France ===
#	Film	Date	Director	Country	Source work	Author	Date	Type
1	Perfume: The Story of a Murderer; Das Parfum – Die Geschichte eines Mörders	2006	Tom Tykwer	Germany, Spain, France	Perfume; Das Parfum	Patrick Süskind	1985	Novel

==== Frequently filmed: Le Bossu ====
#	Film	Date	Director	Country	Source work	Author	Date	Type
1	Le Bossu aka On Guard	1997	Philippe de Broca	France, Italy, Germany	Le Bossu	Paul Féval	1858	Novel

==== Affair of the Diamond Necklace ====
1785

=== Great Britain ===
==== Frequently filmed: Doctor Syn and sequels ====
#	Film	Date	Director	Country	Source work	Author	Date	Type
1	Doctor Syn	1937	Roy William Neill	UK	Doctor Syn: A Tale of the Romney Marsh	Russell Thorndike	1915	Novel
2	Captain Clegg	1962	Peter Graham Scott	UK	Doctor Syn: A Tale of the Romney Marsh	Russell Thorndike	1915	Novel
3	The Scarecrow of Romney Marsh	1963	James Neilson	USA	Doctor Syn: A Tale of the Romney Marsh	Russell Thorndike	1915	Novel

==== Frequently filmed: Moll Flanders ====
#	Film	Date	Director	Country	Source work	Author	Date	Type

=== Württemberg ===
==== Joseph Süß Oppenheimer case ====
1737

===== Bulletin ... upcoming film: Jew Suss: Rise and Fall by Oskar Roehler =====
#	Film	Date	Director	Country	Source work	Author	Date	Type
1	Jew Suss	1934	Michael Balcon	UK	Jud Süß	Lion Feuchtwanger	1925	Novel
2	Jud Süß	1940	Veit Harlan	Nazi Germany	Jud Süß	Lion Feuchtwanger	1925	Novel
2					Jud Süß	Wilhelm Hauff	1827	Novella

== 19th century ==
=== Australia ===
For bushrangers, see List of films based on westerns.

=== Brazil ===
For cangaceiros, see List of films based on westerns.

=== Canada ===
For Mounties, see List of films based on westerns.

=== France ===
==== Corsica ====
#	Film	Date	Director	Country	Source work	Author	Date	Type
1	Vendetta	1950	Howard Hughes (producer)	USA	Colomba	Prosper Mérimée	1840	Novella

==== Dreyfus Affair ====
See List of films based on war books — peace.

==== Joseph Vacher case ====
1894–1897

#	Film	Date	Director	Country	Source work	Author	Date	Type	TV	Date	Country
1	The Judge and the Assassin; Le juge et l'assassin	1976	Bertrand Tavernier	France	Jean-Baptiste Troppmann	Bertrand Tavernier & René Tavernier	1976	Non-fiction	-	-	-

=== India ===
==== Suppression of the Thugs ====
#	Film	Date	Director	Country	Source work	Author	Date	Type
1	The Deceivers	1988	Nicholas Meyer	India & UK	The Deceivers	John Masters	1952	Novel

=== Russia ===
#	Film	Date	Director	Country	Source work	Author	Date	Type
1	Siberian Lady Macbeth; Сибирская леди Макбет	1961	Andrzej Wajda	Poland	Lady Macbeth of the Mtsensk District; Леди Макбет Мценского уезда	Nikolai Leskov	1865	Novel
2	Katerina Izmailova; Катерина Измайлова	1966	Mikhail Shapiro	USSR	Lady Macbeth of the Mtsensk District; Леди Макбет Мценского уезда	Alexander Preis & Dmitri Shostakovich	1932	Libretto
2					Lady Macbeth of the Mtsensk District; Леди Макбет Мценского уезда	Nikolai Leskov	1865	Novel

==== Frequently filmed: The Winter Queen and sequels ====
#	Film	Date	Director	Country	Source work	Author	Date	Type
1	Azazel * Азазель	2002	Aleksandr Adabashyan	Russia	The Winter Queen; Азазель	"Boris Akunin"	1998	Novel

- * TV miniseries

=== United Kingdom ===
#	Film	Date	Director	Country	Source work	Author	Date	Type
1	The Seven Percent Solution	1976	Herbert Ross	UK & USA	The Seven-Per-Cent Solution: Being a Reprint from the Reminiscences of John H. Watson, M.D.	Nicholas Meyer	1974	Novel

==== Twice filmed: Gaslight ====
#	Film	Date	Director	Country	Source work	Author	Date	Type

==== Wreckers ====
#	Film	Date	Director	Country	Source work	Author	Date	Type
1	Jamaica Inn	1939	Alfred Hitchcock	UK	Jamaica Inn	Daphne du Maurier	1936	Novel

==== Cato Street Conspiracy ====
February 1820

==== Burke and Hare case ====
1827–1828

===== Twice filmed: "The Body Snatcher" =====
#	Film	Date	Director	Country	Source work	Author	Date	Type

==== Great Gold Robbery of 1855 ====
15 May 1855

#	Film	Date	Director	Country	Source work	Author	Date	Type
1	The First Great Train Robbery aka The Great Train Robbery	1979	Michael Crichton	UK	The Great Train Robbery	Michael Crichton	1975	Novel

==== Whitechapel murders ====
1888–1891 (Jack the Ripper)

#	Film	Date	Director	Country	Source work	Author	Date	Type
1	Pandora's Box; Die Büchse der Pandora	1929	Georg Wilhelm Pabst	Germany	Pandora's Box	Frank Wedekind	1904	Play
1					Earth Spirit	Frank Wedekind	1895	Play
n	From Hell	2001	Hughes brothers	USA	From Hell	Alan Moore	1991–1996	Graphic novel
n	Murder by Decree	1979	Bob Clark	Canada & UK	Jack the Ripper: The Final Solution	Stephan Knight	1979	Non-fiction

===== Frequently filmed: The Lodger =====
#	Film	Date	Director	Country	Source work	Author	Date	Type

=== United States ===
For outlaws and lawmen, see List of films based on westerns.

#	Film	Date	Director	Country	Source work	Author	Date	Type

==== Frequently filmed: "The Tell-Tale Heart" ====
#	Film	Date	Director	Country	Source work	Author	Date	Type
1	The Tell-Tale Heart	1843	Charles Klein	USA	"The Tell-Tale Heart"	Edgar Allan Poe	1928	Silent Film
2			Ted Parmelee	USA	"The Tell-Tale Heart"	Edgar Allan Poe	1953	Animated Short
3			Ernest Morris	UK	The Tell-Tale Heart	Edgar Allan Poe	1960	British Horror Film

- α Animated film

==== Assassination of Abraham Lincoln ====
14 April 1865
See List of films based on war books — 1775–1898 See also Assassinations in fiction.

==== Impeachment of Andrew Johnson ====
24 February 1868

==== Lizzie Borden case ====
4 August 1892

== 1900s ==
=== United States ===
==== Chester Gillette case ====
11 July 1906

===== Twice filmed: An American Tragedy =====
The novel was the subject of an unproduced 1930 screenplay by Sergei Eisenstein.

#	Film	Date	Director	Country	Source work	Author	Date	Type

== 1910s ==
=== France ===
==== Henri Désiré Landru case ====
1914–1918

=== United Kingdom ===
==== Doctor Crippen case ====
after 31 January 1910

#	Film	Date	Director	Country	Source work	Author	Date	Type
1	The Skeleton of Mrs. Morales; El esqueleto de la señora Morales	1960	Rogelio A. González	Mexico	"The Islington Mystery"	Arthur Machen	1927	Story

== 1920s ==
=== France ===
==== Frequently filmed: L'Affaire Crainquebille ====
#	Film	Date	Director	Country	Source work	Author	Date	Type
1	Crainquebille; Crainquebille	1922	Jacques Feyder	France	Crainquebille	Anatole France	1903	Play
1					L'Affaire Crainquebille	Anatole France	1901	Story

=== Germany ===
#	Film	Date	Director	Country	Source work	Author	Date	Type
1	Pandora's Box; Die Büchse der Pandora	1929	Georg Wilhelm Pabst	Germany	Pandora's Box	Frank Wedekind	1904	Play
1					Earth Spirit	Frank Wedekind	1895	Play

==== Peter Kürten case ====
1929

=== United States ===
==== Bobby Franks murder ====
21 May 1924 (Leopold and Loeb)

#	Film	Date	Director	Country	Source work	Author	Date	Type
1	Rope	1948	Alfred Hitchcock	USA	Rope	Patrick Hamilton	1929	Play
2	Compulsion	1959	Richard Fleischer	USA	Compulsion	Meyer Levin	1957	Novel

==== Death of Thomas Ince ====
19 November 1924

#	Film	Date	Director	Country	Source work	Author	Date	Type
1	The Cat's Meow	2001	Peter Bogdanovich	UK & Germany	The Cat's Meow	Steven Peros	19??	Play

==== Scopes Monkey Trial ====
1925

===== Frequently filmed: Inherit the Wind =====
#	Film	Date	Director	Country	Source work	Author	Date	Type
1	Inherit the Wind	1960	Stanley Kramer	USA	Inherit the Wind	Jerome Lawrence & Robert Edwin Lee	1955	Play

==== Al Capone era ====
1925–1931

#	Film	Date	Director	Country	Source work	Author	Date	Type
n	Scarface	1932	Howard Hawks	USA	Scarface	Armitage Trail	1930 ^{¤}	Novel
n	Road to Perdition	2002	Sam Mendes	USA	Road to Perdition	Max Allan Collins	1998	Graphic novel
n	Legends of the Fall	1994	Edward Zwick	USA	Legends of the Fall	Jim Harrison	1979	Novella

===== St. Valentine's Day Massacre =====
14 February 1929

==== Ruth Snyder case ====
20 March 1927

#	Film	Date	Director	Country	Source work	Author	Date	Type
1	Double Indemnity	1944	Billy Wilder	USA	Double Indemnity	James M. Cain	1936/ 1943	Novel

== 1930s ==
=== Algeria ===
==== Frequently filmed: Pépé le Moko ====
#	Film	Date	Director	Country	Source work	Author	Date	Type
1	Pépé le Moko	1937	Julien Duvivier	France	Pépé le Moko	"Ashelbé"	193?	Novel

=== France ===
#	Film	Date	Director	Country	Source work	Author	Date	Type
1	Judas Was a Woman; La Bête humaine	1938	Jean Renoir	France	La Bête Humaine	Émile Zola	1890	Novel

==== Papin Sisters case ====
2 February 1933

#	Film	Date	Director	Country	Source work	Author	Date	Type
1	Les Abysses; Les Abysses	1963	Nikos Papatakis	France	The Maids; Les Bonnes	Jean Genet	1947	Play
2	The Maids	1974	Christopher Miles	UK	The Maids; Les Bonnes	Jean Genet	1947	Play
3	Sister My Sister	1994	Nancy Meckler	UK	My Sister in This House	Wendy Kesselman	1981	Play
4	Murderous Maids; Les Blessures assassines	2000	Jean-Pierre Denis	France	L'affaire Papin, Le diable dans la peau	Paulette Houdyer	1988	Non-fiction

===== Twice filmed: A Judgement in Stone =====
#	Film	Date	Director	Country	Source work	Author	Date	Type
1	A Judgement in Stone	1986	Ousama Rawi	Canada & UK	A Judgement in Stone	Ruth Rendell	1977	Novel
2	La Cérémonie; La Cérémonie	1995	Claude Chabrol	France & Germany	A Judgement in Stone	Ruth Rendell	1977	Novel

=== Japan ===
==== Sada Abe case ====
18 May 1936

=== United States ===
#	Film	Date	Director	Country	Source work	Author	Date	Type
1	The Petrified Forest	1936	Archie Mayo	USA	The Petrified Forest	Robert E. Sherwood	1935	Play
n	Paper Moon	1973	Peter Bogdanovich	USA	Addie Pray	Joe David Brown	1971	Novel
n	Brother Orchid	1940	Lloyd Bacon	USA	"Brother Orchid" (?)	Richard Connell	1938	Story

==== Scottsboro Boys case ====
23 April 1931

==== Lindbergh kidnapping ====
1 March 1932

===== Frequently filmed: Murder on the Orient Express =====
#	Film	Date	Director	Country	Source work	Author	Date	Type
1	Murder on the Orient Express	1974	Sidney Lumet	UK	Murder on the Orient Express	Agatha Christie	1934	Novel

==== William D. Lundy murder ====
[informative page deleted over copyright violations]
9 December 1932

== 1940s ==
=== Austria ===
#	Film	Date	Director	Country	Source work	Author	Date	Type
1	The Third Man	1949	Carol Reed	UK	The Third Man	Graham Greene	1950	Novella

=== Bahamas ===
==== Sir Harry Oakes murder ====
7 July 1943

=== Canada ===
==== Edwin Alonzo Boyd era ====
1949–1952 (Boyd Gang)

#	Film	Date	Director	Country	Source work	Author	Date	Type
1	The life and Times of Edwin Alonzo Boyd	1982	Les Rose	Canada	The Boyd Gang	Nate Hendley	1976	Non-fiction

- * TV movie

=== France ===
==== Doctor Petiot case ====
before 31 October 1944

=== Italy ===
==== Salvatore Giuliano era ====
===== Portella della Ginestra massacre =====
1 May 1947

#	Film	Date	Director	Country	Source work	Author	Date	Type
1	The Sicilian	1987	Michael Cimino	USA	The Sicilian	Mario Puzo	1984	Novel

==== Pleasure Island ====
===== Frequently filmed: The Adventures of Pinocchio =====
#	Film	Date	Director	Country	Source work	Author	Date	Type
1	Pinocchio ♠ α	1940	Walt Disney (producer)	USA	The Adventures of Pinocchio	Carlo Collodi	1883	Children's book

- ♠ A young innocent is deceived by swindlers and sold into slavery.
- α Animated film

=== Kenya ===
==== Happy Valley murder ====
1941

#	Film	Date	Director	Country	Source work	Author	Date	Type
1	White Mischief	1987	Michael Radford	UK	White Mischief: The Murder of Lord Erroll	James Fox	197?	Non-fiction

=== Newfoundland ===
#	Film	Date	Director	Country	Source work	Author	Date	Type
1	Young Triffie	2007	Mary Walsh	Canada	Young Triffie's Been Made Away With	Ray Guy	1985	Play

=== United States ===
#	Film	Date	Director	Country	Source work	Author	Date	Type
1	Dishonored Lady	1947	Robert Stevenson	USA	Dishonored Lady	Edward Sheldon & Margaret Ayer Barnes	1930	Play
n	Intruder in the Dust	1949	Clarence Brown	USA	Intruder in the Dust	William Faulkner	1948	Novel
n	Undercurrent	1946	Vincente Minnelli	USA	You Were There	Thelma Strabel	194?	Novel

==== Sleepy Lagoon murder ====
2 August 1942

#	Film	Date	Director	Country	Source work	Author	Date	Type
1	Zoot Suit	1981	Luis Valdez	USA	Zoot Suit	Luis Valdez	1979	Play

==== Black Dahlia murder ====
c. 15 January 1947

=== West Germany ===
#	Film	Date	Director	Country	Source work	Author	Date	Type
1	The Good German	2006	Steven Soderbergh	USA	The Good German	Joseph Kanon	2001	Novel

== 1950s ==
=== Canada ===
#	Film	Date	Director	Country	Source work	Author	Date	Type
1	I Confess	1953	Alfred Hitchcock	USA	Nos deux consciences	"Paul Anthelme"	1902	Play

=== France ===
#	Film	Date	Director	Country	Source work	Author	Date	Type
1	Irma la Douce	1963	Billy Wilder	USA	Irma la douce	Alexandre Breffort	1956	Musical

=== United Kingdom ===
==== Stone of Scone theft ====
25 December 1950 (Christmas Day robbery of a church)

#	Film	Date	Director	Country	Source work	Author	Date	Type
1	Stone of Destiny	2008	Charles Martin Smith	UK & Canada	No Stone Unturned: The Story of the Stone of Destiny aka Taking of the Stone of Destiny	Ian R. Hamilton	1952	Memoir

==== Ruth Ellis case ====
1955

#	Film	Date	Director	Country	Source work	Author	Date	Type
1	Pierrepoint	1995	Adrian Shergold	UK	Executioner: Pierrepoint	Albert Pierrepoint	1974	Memoir

=== United States ===
==== Great Brink's Robbery ====
17 January 1950

==== Coleman Peterson case ====
31 July 1952

#	Film	Date	Director	Country	Source work	Author	Date	Type
1	Anatomy of a Murder	1959	Otto Preminger	USA	Anatomy of a Murder	"Robert Traver"	1958	Novel

==== Ed Gein case ====
1957

#	Film	Date	Director	Country	Source work	Author	Date	Type
1	The Silence of the Lambs	1991	Jonathan Demme	USA	The Silence of the Lambs	Thomas Harris	1988	Novel

===== Frequently filmed: Psycho =====
#	Film	Date	Director	Country	Source work	Author	Date	Type
1	Psycho	1960	Alfred Hitchcock	USA	Psycho	Robert Bloch	1959	Novel

==== Suicide of George Reeves ====
16 June 1959

==== Clutter Family murders ====
15 November 1959

#	Film	Date	Director	Country	Source work	Author	Date	Type
1	In Cold Blood	1967	Richard Brooks	USA	In Cold Blood	Truman Capote	1966	Nonfiction
2	In Cold Blood	1996	Jonathan Kaplan	USA	In Cold Blood	Truman Capote	1966	Nonfiction
3	Capote	2005	Bennett Miller	USA	Capote	Gerald Clarke	199?	Biography
4	Infamous	2006	Douglas McGrath	USA	Capote: In Which Various Friends, Enemies, Acquaintances and Detractors Recall His Turbulent Career	George Plimpton	1997	Biography

== 1960s ==
=== Argentina ===
==== San Fernando bank robbery ====
1965

#	Film	Date	Director	Country	Source work	Author	Date	Type
1	Burnt Money ♣ Plata quemada	2000	Marcelo Piñeyro	Argentina, France, Spain, Uruguay	Money to Burn; Plata quemada	Ricardo Piglia	1997	Novel

- ♣ The robbery took place in Argentina; the pursuit ended in Uruguay.

=== France ===
#	Film	Date	Director	Country	Source work	Author	Date	Type
n	La Horse ♠ La Horse	1970	Pierre Granier-Deferre	France	La Horse	Michel Lambesc	196?	Novel

- ♠ The film was remade for television in 2005 as Joseph.

=== Sweden ===
==== Frequently filmed: Roseanna and sequels ====
#	Film	Date	Director	Country	Source work	Author	Date	Type
n	Stockholm Marathon; Stockholm Marathon	1994	Peter Keglevic	Sweden & Germany	The Terrorists	Sjöwall and Wahlöö	1975	Novel
n	The Laughing Policeman Δ	1973	Stuart Rosenberg	USA	The Laughing Policeman	Sjöwall and Wahlöö	1968	Novel

- Δ The film adaptation changes the setting from Stockholm to San Francisco.

=== Turkey ===
==== Topkapı Museum ====
#	Film	Date	Director	Country	Source work	Author	Date	Type
1	Topkapi	1964	Jules Dassin	USA	The Light of Day	Eric Ambler	1962	Novel

=== United Kingdom ===
#	Film	Date	Director	Country	Source work	Author	Date	Type
n	Loot	1970	Silvio Narizzano	UK	Loot	Joe Orton	1965	Play

==== Profumo affair ====
1963

#	Film	Date	Director	Country	Source work	Author	Date	Type
1	Scandal	1989	Michael Caton-Jones	UK	Scandal (uncredited)	Christine Keeler (uncredited)	1989	Memoir

=== Uruguay ===
==== San Fernando bank robbery getaway ====
1965

#	Film	Date	Director	Country	Source work	Author	Date	Type
1	Burnt Money ♣ Plata quemada	2000	Marcelo Piñeyro	Argentina, France, Spain, Uruguay	Money to Burn; Plata quemada	Ricardo Piglia	1997	Novel

- ♣ The robbery took place in Argentina; the pursuit ended in Uruguay.

=== United States ===
#	Film	Date	Director	Country	Source work	Author	Date	Type
1	Fitzwilly	1967	Delbert Mann	USA	A Garden of Cucumbers	Poyntz Tyler	1960	Novel

==== Clarence Earl Gideon case ====
3 June 1961

==== Ian James Campbell murder ====
9 March 1963

#	Film	Date	Director	Country	Source work	Author	Date	Type
1	The Onion Field	1979	Harold Becker	USA	The Onion Field	Joseph Wambaugh	1973	Non-fiction

==== Boston Strangler case ====
1962–1964

==== Assassination of John F. Kennedy ====
22 November 1963

===== Bulletin ... film currently in development: Reclaiming History =====
#	Film	Date	Director	Country	Source work	Author	Date	Type
1	Four Days in November δ †	1964	Mel Stuart	USA	Warren Report	Earl Warren for Warren Commission	1964	Report
2	Lee Oswald — Assassin *	1966	Rudolph Cartier	UK	Dallas, 22. November	Felix Lützkendorf	1965	Play
3	Rush to Judgment δ	1967	Emile de Antonio	USA	Rush to Judgment	Mark Lane	1966	Non-fiction
4	Executive Action	1973	David Miller	USA	Rush to Judgment (uncredited)	Mark Lane ♣	1966	Non-fiction
5	On Trial: Lee Harvey Oswald δ *	1986	LWT (producer)	UK	Reclaiming History: The Assassination of President John F. Kennedy ♦	Vincent Bugliosi	2007	Non-fiction
6	JFK	1991	Oliver Stone	USA	On the Trail of the Assassins	Jim Garrison ♠	1990	Non-fiction
6					Crossfire: The Plot That Killed Kennedy	Jim Marrs ♠	1989	Non-fiction
6					JFK: The CIA, Vietnam and the Plot to Assassinate John F. Kennedy ♥ (uncredited)	L. Fletcher Prouty ♠ (uncredited)	1992	Non-fiction
6					JFK and Vietnam: Deception, Intrigue, and the Struggle for Power (uncredited)	John M. Newman ♠ (uncredited)	1992	Non-fiction
7	Reclaiming History: The Assassination of President John F. Kennedy **	2013	In Development	USA	Reclaiming History: The Assassination of President John F. Kennedy	Vincent Bugliosi	2007	Non-fiction

- ♣ Lane is credited as screenwriter, rather than as author.
- ♦ Bugliosi's preparation for the televised "trial" of deceased defendant Oswald became the book Reclaiming History.
- ♠ The authors are credited as technical advisors on JFK.
- ♥ Prouty's book has an introduction by Oliver Stone.
- * TV special
- ** TV miniseries
- δ Documentary
- † Dramatized documentary

See also Assassinations in fiction.

==== Kitty Genovese murder ====
13 March 1964

==== Sylvia Likens murder ====
26 October 1965

#	Film	Date	Director	Country	Source work	Author	Date	Type
1	The Girl Next Door	2007	Gregory Wilson	USA	The Girl Next Door	Jack Ketchum	2005	Novel

==== Richard Speck case ====
13 July 1966

==== Tate–LaBianca murders ====
1969 (Manson Family)

==== Zodiac case ====
#	Film	Date	Director	Country	Source work	Author	Date	Type
1	Zodiac	2007	David Fincher	USA	Zodiac	Robert Graysmith	1986	Non-fiction

== 1970s ==
=== Canada ===
==== Helen Betty Osborne murder ====
13 November 1971

#	Film	Date	Director	Country	Source work	Author	Date	Type
1	Conspiracy of Silence *	1991	Francis Mankiewicz	Canada	Conspiracy of Silence	Lisa Priest	1989 ^{¤}	Non-fiction

- * TV movie

=== Guyana ===
==== Jonestown Massacre ====
18 November 1978

=== Italy ===
#	Film	Date	Director	Country	Source work	Author	Date	Type
1	Don't Look Now	1973	Nicolas Roeg	UK & Italy	"Don't Look Now" from Not After Midnight	Daphne du Maurier	1971	Story

=== Sweden ===
==== Norrmalmstorg bank robbery ====
23–28 August 1973 (Stockholm syndrome)

=== United Kingdom ===
==== Bulletin ... film now in production: Straw Dogs by Rod Lurie ====
#	Film	Date	Director	Country	Source work	Author	Date	Type
1	Straw Dogs	1971	Sam Peckinpah	USA	The Siege of Trencher's Farm	Gordon Williams	197?	Novel
n	The Wicker Man	1973	Robin Hardy	UK	The Ritual	David Pinner	1967	Novel

==== Baker Street bank robbery ====
11 September 1971

==== What if ... ====
#	Film	Date	Director	Country	Source work	Author	Date	Type
1	A Clockwork Orange	1971	Stanley Kubrick	UK	A Clockwork Orange ♠	Anthony Burgess	1962	Novel

- ♠ The earliest editions of the novel did not contain a glossary, or any indication that the slang was based on Russian.

=== United States ===
#	Film	Date	Director	Country	Source work	Author	Date	Type

==== New England ====
#	Film	Date	Director	Country	Source work	Author	Date	Type
1	The Catamount Killing ♠ Lohngelder für Pittsville; Morderstwo w Catamount	1974	Krzysztof Zanussi	USA & West Germany	I'd Rather Stay Poor	James Hadley Chase	1962	Novel

- ♠ The film, shot in Bennington, Vermont, involves a "bank in a remote town in New England".
  "Catamount" is an infrequently used term for a cougar, but here refers to the fictitious town.

==== Jeffrey MacDonald case ====
17 February 1970

#	Film	Date	Director	Country	Source work	Author	Date	Type
1	Fatal Vision **	1984	David Greene	USA	Fatal Vision	Joe McGinniss	1983	Non-fiction

- ** TV miniseries

==== Knapp Commission on NYPD corruption ====
1970–1972

#	Film	Date	Director	Country	Source work	Author	Date	Type
1	Serpico	1973	Sidney Lumet	USA	Serpico: The Cop Who Defied the System	Peter Maas	1973?	Non-fiction

==== Watergate burglary ====
17 June 1972

#	Film	Date	Director	Country	Source work	Author	Date	Type
1	All the President's Men	1976	Alan J. Pakula	USA	All the President's Men	Carl Bernstein & Bob Woodward	1974	Memoir
2	Blind Ambition *	1979	George Schaefer	USA	Blind Ambition: The White House Years	John Dean with Taylor Branch	1976	Memoir
3	Nixon	1995	Oliver Stone	USA	The Final Days	Bob Woodward & Carl Bernstein	1976	Non-fiction
3					Richard Nixon: The Shaping of His Character (uncredited)	Fawn Brodie (uncredited)	1981	Non-fiction
3					Nixon: the Education of a Politician 1913-62 (uncredited)	Stephen Ambrose (uncredited)	1991	Non-fiction
3					Nixon: the Triumph of a Politician 1962-72 (uncredited)	Stephen Ambrose (uncredited)	1991	Non-fiction
3					Nixon: Ruin and Recovery 1973-90 (uncredited)	Stephen Ambrose (uncredited)	1991	Non-fiction
3					Nixon: A Life (uncredited)	Jonathan Aitken (uncredited)	1996	Non-fiction
3					"The Second Coming" (uncredited)	W.B. Yeats (uncredited)	1920	Poem

- * TV movie

==== Gay Brooklyn bank robbery ====
22 August 1972

#	Film	Date	Director	Country	Source work	Author	Date	Type
1	Dog Day Afternoon	1975	Sidney Lumet	USA	"The Boys in the Bank"	P.F. Kluge	1972	Article

==== Ted Bundy case ====
1974–1978

#	Film	Date	Director	Country	Source work	Author	Date	Type
1	The Deliberate Stranger *	1986	Marvin J. Chomsky	USA	Bundy: The Deliberate Stranger	Richard W. Larsen	1980	Non-fiction

- * TV movie

==== Frank Lucas case ====
before 1975

#	Film	Date	Director	Country	Source work	Author	Date	Type
1	American Gangster	2007	Ridley Scott	USA	"The Return of Superfly"	Mark Jacobson	197?	Article

==== Martha Moxley murder ====
31 October 1975

#	Film	Date	Director	Country	Source work	Author	Date	Type
1	Murder in Greenwich *	2002	Tom McLoughlin	USA	Murder in Greenwich: Who Killed Martha Moxley?	Mark Fuhrman	1998	Non-fiction

- * TV movie

==== Hillside Strangler case ====
1977–1978

#	Film	Date	Director	Country	Source work	Author	Date	Type
1	The Case of the Hillside Stranglers *	1989	Steve Gethers	USA	Two of a Kind: The Story of the Hillside Stranglers	Darcy O'Brien	1985	Non-fiction

- * TV movie

==== Bob Crane murder ====
29 June 1978

#	Film	Date	Director	Country	Source work	Author	Date	Type
1	Auto Focus	2002	Paul Schrader	USA	The Murder of Bob Crane: Who Killed the Star of Hogan's Heroes?	Robert Graysmith	199?	Biography

==== What if ... ====
#	Film	Date	Director	Country	Source work	Author	Date	Type
1	The Night Stalker *	1972	John Llewellyn Moxey	USA	The Kolchak Papers aka The Night Stalker	Jeff Rice	197?	Novel

- * TV movie

== 1980s ==
=== Australia ===
==== Azaria Chamberlain disappearance ====
17 August 1980 (dingo baby abduction)

#	Film	Date	Director	Country	Source work	Author	Date	Type
1	Evil Angels (aka A Cry in the Dark)	1988	Fred Schepisi	Australia and USA	Evil Angels	John Bryson	1985	Non-fiction

=== Canada ===
#	Film	Date	Director	Country	Source work	Author	Date	Type
1	The Suicide Murders *	1985	Graham Parker	Canada	The Suicide Murders	Howard Engel	1980	Novel

- * TV movie

==== Colin Thatcher case ====
21 January 1983

==== Montreal Massacre ====
6 December 1989

=== France ===
#	Film	Date	Director	Country	Source work	Author	Date	Type
1	Le Choc; Le Choc	1982	Robin Davis	France	The Prone Gunman; La Position du tireur couché	Jean-Patrick Manchette	1982 ?	Novel

==== Roberto Succo case ====
1980s

#	Film	Date	Director	Country	Source work	Author	Date	Type
1	Roberto Succo; Roberto Succo	2001	Cédric Kahn	France	Je te tue : histoire vraie de Roberto Succo, assassin sans raison	Pascale Froment	1991	Non-fiction

=== India ===
==== Phoolan Devi case ====
#	Film	Date	Director	Country	Source work	Author	Date	Type
1	Bandit Queen	1994	Shekhar Kapur	India	India's Bandit Queen: The True Story of Phoolan Devi	Mala Sen	1993?	Non-fiction

=== Iran ===
==== Soraya M. case ====
1986

#	Film	Date	Director	Country	Source work	Author	Date	Type
1	The Stoning of Soraya M. سنگسار ثریا م.	2008	Cyrus Nowrasteh	USA	The Stoning of Soraya M. La Femme lapidée	Freidoune Sahebjam	1990	Novel

=== Mexico ===
==== Enrique Camarena murder ====
9 February 1985

#	Film	Date	Director	Country	Source work	Author	Date	Type
1	Drug Wars: The Camarena Story **	1990	Brian Gibson	USA	Desperados	Elaine Shannon	1988	Non-fiction

- ** TV miniseries

=== Soviet Union ===
#	Film	Date	Director	Country	Source work	Author	Date	Type
1	Gorky Park	1983	Michael Apted	USA	Gorky Park	Martin Cruz Smith	1981	Novel

==== Andrei Chikatilo case ====
1978–1990

#	Film	Date	Director	Country	Source work	Author	Date	Type
1	Citizen X *	1995	Chris Gerolmo	USA	The Killer Department	Robert Cullen	1993	Non-fiction

- * TV movie

===== What if ... =====
#	Film	Date	Director	Country	Source work	Author	Date	Type
1	Evilenko ♠	2004	David Grieco	Italy	The Communist Who Ate Children	David Grieco	199?	Novel

- ♠ In this version, the murderer, renamed Evilenko, has psychic powers.

=== United States ===
#	Film	Date	Director	Country	Source work	Author	Date	Type
n	Scarface	1983	Brian De Palma	USA	Scarface (uncredited)	Armitage Trail (uncredited)	1930	Novel
n	The Local Stigmatic	1990/ 2007	Al Pacino (uncredited) & David Wheeler	USA	The Local Stigmatic	Heathcote Williams	196?	Play
n	Die Hard	1988	John McTiernan	USA	Nothing Lasts Forever	Roderick Thorp	1979	Novel

==== Doctor Tarnower murder ====
10 March 1980 (Scarsdale Diet author death)

#	Film	Date	Director	Country	Source work	Author	Date	Type
1	Mrs. Harris *	2005	Phyllis Nagy	USA	Very Much a Lady: The Untold Story of Jean Harris and Dr. Herman Tarnower	Shana Alexander	1983	Non-fiction

- * TV movie

==== John Lennon murder ====
8 December 1980

#	Film	Date	Director	Country	Source work	Author	Date	Type
1	Chapter 27	2005	J. P. Schaefer	USA	Let Me Take You Down	Jack Jones	200?	Non-fiction
1					Nowhere Man: The Final Days of John Lennon (uncredited)	Robert Rosen (uncredited)	2000	Non-fiction

See also Assassinations in fiction.

==== Lawrencia "Bambi" Bembenek case ====
28 May 1981

#	Film	Date	Director	Country	Source work	Author	Date	Type
1	Woman on the Run: The Lawrencia Bembenek Story * aka Woman on Trial: The Lawrencia Bembenek Story	1993	Sandor Stern	Canada & USA	Woman on Trial	Lawrencia Bembenek	1992	Memoir

- * TV movie

==== Henry Lee Lucas case ====
before 11 June 1983

#	Film	Date	Director	Country	Source work	Author	Date	Type
1	Henry: Portrait of a Serial Killer	1986	John McNaughton	USA	Lucas Report (uncredited)	Jim Mattox, Texas Attorney General (office of) (uncredited)	1986	Report

==== Alan Berg murder ====
18 June 1984

#	Film	Date	Director	Country	Source work	Author	Date	Type
1	Talk Radio	1988	Oliver Stone	USA	Talk Radio	Eric Bogosian	1987	Play
1					Talked to Death: The Life and Murder of Alan Berg	Stephen Singular	198?	Non-fiction

See also Assassinations in fiction.

==== Exxon Valdez disaster ====
23 March 1989

=== West Germany ===
#	Film	Date	Director	Country	Source work	Author	Date	Type
1	Buffalo Soldiers	2001	Gregor Jordan	USA	Buffalo Soldiers	Robert O'Connor	1993	Novel

== 1990s ==
=== Belgium ===
#	Film	Date	Director	Country	Source work	Author	Date	Type
1	The Memory of a Killer; De zaak Alzheimer	2003	Erik Van Looy	Belgium	De zaak Alzheimer	Jef Geeraerts	1985	Novel

=== Canada ===
==== Paul Bernardo case ====
up to 1992

=== France ===
#	Film	Date	Director	Country	Source work	Author	Date	Type
1	The Crimson Rivers; Les Rivières pourpres	2000	Mathieu Kassovitz	France	Blood Red Rivers	Jean-Christophe Grangé	1998	Novel
n	Fuck Me aka Rape Me; Baise-moi	2000	Virginie Despentes & Coralie Trinh Thi	France	Baise-moi	Virginie Despentes	1993	Novel

=== India ===
==== Bombay bombings of 1993 ====
12 March 1993

#	Film	Date	Director	Country	Source work	Author	Date	Type
1	Black Friday	2004	Anurag Kashyap	India	Black Friday – The True Story of the Bombay Bomb Blasts	S. Hussain Zaidi	199?	Non-fiction

=== Singapore ===
==== Barings Bank collapse ====
1995

#	Film	Date	Director	Country	Source work	Author	Date	Type
1	Rogue Trader	1999	James Dearden	UK	Rogue Trader: How I Brought Down Barings Bank and Shook the Financial World	Nick Leeson	199?	Memoir

=== Spain ===
#	Film	Date	Director	Country	Source work	Author	Date	Type
1	Nadie conoce a nadie ♠	1999	Mateo Gil	Spain	El que apaga la luz	Juan Bonilla	1994	Novel (?)

- ♠ A crossword puzzle writer becomes involved in a bizarre mystery in Seville.

=== United Kingdom ===
==== James Bulger murder ====
12 February 1993

#	Film	Date	Director	Country	Source work	Author	Date	Type	Basis
1	Boy A ♠	2007	John Crowley	UK	Boy A	Jonathan Trigell	2004	Novel	–

- ♠ The principal connection to the Bulger case appears to be the youthfulness of the convicted boys.

=== United States ===
#	Film	Date	Director	Country	Source work	Author	Date	Type
n	Night Falls on Manhattan	1997	Sidney Lumet	USA	Tainted Evidence	Robert Daley	1997 ?	Novel

==== Suicide of Vince Foster ====
20 July 1993

#	Film	Date	Director	Country	Source work	Author	Date	Type
1	Primary Colors	1998	Mike Nichols	USA	Primary Colors: A Novel of Politics	"Anonymous" (Joe Klein)	1996	Novel

== 2000s ==
=== Aruba ===
==== Natalee Holloway disappearance ====
30 May 2005

#	Film	Date	Director	Country	Source work	Author	Date	Type
1	Natalee Holloway*	2009	Mikael Salomon	USA	Loving Natalee: A Mother's Testament of Hope and Faith	Beth Holloway	2007	Non-fiction

- * TV movie

=== Brazil ===
#	Film	Date	Director	Country	Source work	Author	Date	Type
1	City of God; Cidade de Deus	2002	Fernando Meirelles & Kátia Lund	Brazil	City of God; Cidade de Deus	Paulo Lins	1997	Novel

=== Italy ===
#	Film	Date	Director	Country	Source work	Author	Date	Type
1	Gomorrah; Gomorra	2008	Matteo Garrone	Italy	Gomorrah; Gomorra – Viaggio nell'impero economico e nel sogno di dominio della camorra	Roberto Saviano	2006	Non-fiction

=== Mexico ===
#	Film	Date	Director	Country	Source work	Author	Date	Type
1	Trade	2007	Marco Kreuzpaintner	Germany	"The Girls Next Door"	Peter Landesman	2004	Article

=== South Korea ===
==== Hwaseong serial murders ====
#	Film	Date	Director	Country	Source work	Author	Date	Type
1	Memories of Murder	2003	Bong Joon-ho	South Korea	Memories of Murder	Shim Sung-bo	1996	Play

=== United States ===
#	Film	Date	Director	Country	Source work	Author	Date	Type
1	Sin City д	2005	Frank Miller & Robert Rodriguez	USA	The Hard Goodbye	Frank Miller	1991–1992	Graphic novel
n	Reversible Errors **	2004	Mike Robe	USA	Reversible Errors	Scott Turow	2002	Novel

- д Decade when story occurs is presumed.
- ** TV miniseries

==== Valerie Plame exposure ====
14 July 2003

===== Bulletin ... upcoming film: Fair Game by Doug Liman =====
#	Film	Date	Director	Country	Source work	Author	Date	Type
1	Fair Game	2010	Doug Liman	USA	Fair Game: My Life as a Spy, My Betrayal by the White House	Valerie Plame Wilson	2007	Memoir

== Political crimes ==
For political prisoners, see List of films based on civics books.

== Drug trade ==
For traffickers, see above.
For addicts, see List of films based on civics books.

== Prisons ==
For punishment and prisons, see List of films based on civics books.

== See also ==
- Assassinations in fiction

Pages with the same format

- List of films based on arts books
- List of films based on civics books
- List of films based on film books
- List of films based on sports books
- List of films based on spy books
- List of films based on war books
- List of films based on westerns

Return to top of page.
