= A Gentleman's Game =

- Directed by: J. Mills Goodloe
- Screenplay by: J. Mills Goodloe; Tom Coyne
- Based on: A Gentleman's Game by Tom Coyne
- Produced by: Kimberly Braswell
- Starring: Mason Gamble; Dylan Baker; Philip Baker Hall; Gary Sinise
- Cinematography: Conrad W. Hall
- Edited by: Tia Nolan
- Music by: Jeff Beal
- Distributed by: First Look Studios
- Release date: 2002
- Running time: 112 minutes
- Country: United States
- Language: English

A Gentleman's Game is a 2002 American sports drama film directed by J. Mills Goodloe and starring Mason Gamble, Dylan Baker, Philip Baker Hall and Gary Sinise. It is based on the novel of the same name by Tom Coyne.

== Cast ==
- Mason Gamble as Timmy Price
- Dylan Baker as Mr. Price
- Philip Baker Hall as Charlie Logan
- Gary Sinise as Foster Pearse
- Brian Doyle-Murray as Tomato Face
- Henry Simmons
- Ellen Muth
