= Tom Coyne (writer) =

American writer and professor

Coyne at the 2026 Texas Book Festival

Tom Coyne is an American writer, professor, and editor. Coyne has published five books, A Gentleman's Game (2002), Paper Tiger (2007), A Course Called Ireland (2009), A Course Called Scotland (2019), and A Course Called America (2021). A Gentleman's Game was adapted into a feature film starring Gary Sinise and Dylan Baker. After graduating from Archmere Academy, Coyne attended the University of Notre Dame, and then moved to Philadelphia, Pennsylvania, where he became an English professor at Saint Joseph's University.

In January 2024, Coyne was appointed the editor of the golf quarterly The Golfer's Journal.

== Publications ==
=== A Gentleman's Game ===
A novel about a young Timmy Price, who inspires jealousy at an exclusive golf club in Delaware.

=== Paper Tiger ===
Paper Tiger is a true story about Tom Coyne's journey into the world of professional golf. Coyne's odyssey would include leaving Philadelphia, Pennsylvania to live in Florida. Coyne would enlist the help of swing doctor Dr. Jim Suttie and go through rigorous weight training in preparation. Coyne would also seek sports psychologist Dr. Robert Winters to help fulfill his dream. Coyne would go from a 15 handicap to a plus, but would not play well enough to gain entrance to stage one of the PGA Tour's qualifying school. Coyne would play numerous mini-tour events, including a Nationwide Tour event, and play against teenage golfing phenomenon Michelle Wie in a Public Links qualifier.

=== A Course Called Ireland ===
Coyne's next project took him to the links courses of Ireland; not just to play some rounds but to play the country itself. Coyne walked around the perimeter of the Republic and Northern Ireland, without the use of any transportation, playing the courses en route: 36 courses, 648 holes, over 2,000,000 yards.

The resulting book was published by Gotham Books, and released on February 19, 2009.

=== A Course Called Scotland ===
Coyne's fourth book was released in 2019 detailing his journey of more than 100 courses in the home of golf.

=== A Course Called America ===
Coyne's fifth book was released in 2021 detailing his journey of the United States to find the great American golf course.

== Television ==
=== A Course Called Ireland ===
In 2026, Coyne co-hosted a six-episode television series with Bill Murray called A Course Called Ireland in which Coyne and Murray play golf around Ireland. The show states it is not about golf and not about Bill Murray but about "us" (the people of Ireland).
