= The Far Horizons =

1955 film

- 1955 theatrical poster
- Directed by: Rudolph Maté
- Written by: Winston Miller; Edmund H. North; Della Gould Emmons (novel)
- Produced by: William H. Pine
- Starring: Fred MacMurray; Charlton Heston; Donna Reed; Barbara Hale
- Cinematography: Daniel L. Fapp
- Edited by: Frank Bracht
- Music by: Hans J. Salter
- Production company: Pine-Thomas Productions
- Distributed by: Paramount Pictures
- Release date: May 20, 1955
- Running time: 108 minutes
- Country: United States
- Language: English
- Box office: $1.6 million (US)

The Far Horizons is a 1955 American historical Western film directed by Rudolph Maté about the Lewis and Clark Expedition. It is based on 1943 novel Sacajawea of the Shoshones by Della Gould Emmons and stars Fred MacMurray, Charlton Heston, Donna Reed and Barbara Hale.

Although the film is the only major American motion picture about the Lewis and Clark Expedition, many details are fictional and historically inaccurate. It was rereleased in 1962 by Citation Films as Untamed West in a double feature with Jungle Attack.

== Plot ==
In 1803, the United States Congress approves the Louisiana Purchase from France. Meriwether Lewis is summoned to the White House by President Thomas Jefferson, who asks Lewis to lead an expedition to explore beyond the newly claimed land to the Pacific Ocean. Lewis reluctantly agrees and requests that his friend William Clark accompany him at equal rank. However, upon returning to Virginia to inform his love interest Julia Hancock, Lewis is surprised to learn that Clark has proposed to Julia, which causes tension between the men.

At Wood River, Lewis and Clark meet Sergeant Gass and the volunteers before departing in a keelboat. Clark learns that he has not been officially promoted to the rank of captain as promised, but Lewis insists that he is. After months of traveling north on the Missouri River, the expedition encounters the Minnataree tribe and negotiates a peace offering. Sacagawea, a Shoshone woman kidnapped by the Minnataree, requests to accompany Lewis and Clark as a guide and return to her people. Meanwhile, Charbonneau, a French man living in the tribe, joins the expedition, but he secretly plans with the Minnataree to betray the group in exchange for Sacagawea.

Sacagawea learns of the Minnatarees' plans to attack and escapes on horseback to warn Lewis and Clark. Her mission is a success and the impressed captains invite her to join the expedition. At a fork in the river, Lewis and Clark separate the men with plans to reunite upstream. Sacagawea accompanies Clark's team and later rescues his journal from falling in the river. After helping Clark overcome a fever, Sacagawea and Clark begin to fall in love, and Clark renames Sacagawea as Janey.

The expedition reunites and Sacagawea finds her brother, Cameahwait. Lewis believes that Clark's feelings toward Sacagawea are placing the expedition at risk and, against Clark's wishes, insists that Sacagawea leave the expedition and stay with her people. However, she chases the expedition along the river and is rejoined with Clark. Upset over Sacagawea's return, Lewis plans to have Clark court-martialed when they return home.

After the deaths of some crewmen, Gass informs the captains that the crew is aware of the tension between Lewis and Clark and that that they have ventured far past the Louisiana territory, with the men wishing to journey back. Lewis states that his mission is to reach the Pacific Ocean and the crew decides to continue forward. Upon reaching the ocean, Clark tells Lewis that he is taking Sacagawea with him to Washington. Lewis retaliates by disclosing that he has already logged Clark's insubordination in his journal for Jefferson.

In 1807, Lewis and Clark return to the White House and are congratulated by Jefferson. Clark introduces Sacagawea to the president, who thanks her for contributions for the expedition. Sacagawea is escorted away by Julia and the two women learn of each other's feelings for Clark. Lewis decides not to punish Clark and removes the final pages of his journal before submitting it to Jefferson. At a gala, Clark learns from Julia that Sacagawea has left a goodbye letter for him stating that she is returning to her people.

== Cast ==
- Fred MacMurray as Captain Meriwether Lewis
- Charlton Heston as Lt. William Clark
- Donna Reed as Sacagawea / "Janey"
- Barbara Hale as Julia Hancock
- William Demarest as Sgt. Gass
- Alan Reed as Charbonneau
- Eduardo Noriega as Cameahwait
- Larry Pennell as Wild Eagle
- Julia Montoya as Crow woman
- Ralph Moody as Le Borgne
- Herbert Heyes as President Thomas Jefferson
- Lester Matthews as Mr. Hancock
- Helen Wallace as Mrs. Marsha Hancock
- Walter Reed as Cruzatte (helmsman)

== Production ==
The film was known during production as The Blue Horizon. It was shot at Jackson Hole and Grand Teton National Park in Wyoming.

== Reception ==
In a contemporary review for The New York Times, critic Howard Thompson called The Far Horizons "a surprisingly dull account" and wrote: "[T]his slow and unimaginative safari seldom suggests either history or life. In some respects it is absurd. .. Rudolph Mate's direction could hardly be more fumbling and erratic. As for Paramount's idea of what Lewis and Clark did, was this trip necessary? Shucks, no."

== Historical inaccuracies ==
In 2011, Time Magazine ranked The Far Horizons among the top ten most historically misleading films because of its casting of Donna Reed as Shoshone Sacagawea and the romantic subplot between her character and Capt. William Clark. In actuality, Sacagawea was 16-years-old when she joined the expedition and was married to French-Canadian trader Toussaint Charbonneau. She also did not speak English and never visited Washington, D.C. Hers and Charbonneau's newborn son, Jean Baptiste, is entirely omitted from the film.

Famous members of the expedition like Sgt. John Ordway, Clark's slave York, and Lewis's Newfoundland dog named Seaman all make no appearance. While the film depicts the death of several expedition members, however, the only casualty was Sgt. Charles Floyd, who died from an internal disease during the very early months of the expedition. The events with the Minataree are based on incidents with several plains tribes, notably a hostile occurrence with the Teton Sioux and the peaceful relationship with Mandan. The crew did not travel on the keelboat throughout the entire journey, instead having a small return party sail it back to St. Louis from present-day North Dakota in April 1805. Scenes with the expedition dividing up to explore alternate rivers only occurred during the return journey in 1806.

The dramatic rivalry between Lewis and Clark is fictional. Historically, Clark was also older than Lewis by four years. While Heston was cast close to Clark's age, MacMurray was 46-years-old during production (Lewis was 29 at the beginning of the journey and only lived till age 35).

== See also ==
- List of American films of 1955
