= Fighting Back: The Rocky Bleier Story =

1980 television film

- Genre: Biography; Drama; Sport
- Written by: Jerry McNeely
- Directed by: Robert Lieberman
- Starring: Robert Urich; Bonnie Bedelia
- Composer: Fred Karlin
- Country of origin: United States
- Original language: English

Production
- Executive producer: Jerry McNeely
- Producer: Donald A. Baer
- Production location: Pittsburgh
- Cinematography: Stevan Larner
- Editor: A. David Marshall
- Running time: 95 minutes
- Production companies: MTM Enterprises; Company Four

Original release
- Network: ABC
- Release: December 7, 1980

Fighting Back: The Rocky Bleier Story is a 1980 made-for-television movie about the life of Pittsburgh Steelers running back Rocky Bleier, portrayed by Robert Urich.

Based on Bleier's 1975 autobiography of the same name, it tells the story of how after becoming a running back for the Steelers in 1968, Bleier was drafted by the U.S. Army during the Vietnam War. Injured by a bullet to the thigh and a hand grenade to the lower right leg, Bleier is told that he will never walk again. Not only does he walk again after a long rehabilitation, but Bleier also returns to train with the Steelers. With the sympathy and support of his wife Aleta (Bonnie Bedelia), Steelers owner Art Rooney (Art Carney), and coach Chuck Noll (Richard Herd), Bleier makes the team again and helps them become Super Bowl champions.

This movie is a rarity among MTM Productions in that its rights remain co-owned with the network which originally aired the movie, although ABC's parent company The Walt Disney Company now holds the rights to the MTM library through Disney Media and Entertainment Distribution on behalf of Twentieth Television.

== See also ==
- List of American football films
