= Della Gould Emmons =

Della Gould Emmons (August 12, 1890 – November 6, 1983) was an American author.

== Books ==
Written in 1943, Emmons' first book, which she wrote following her move west along the Lewis and Clark Trail, Sacajawea of the Shoshones, was adapted into the film The Far Horizons in 1955. The work was unique in its time for using Sacajawea's personal point of view. In her second book, Nothing in Life is Free, an Indiana couple is lured westward by the offer of free land in Washington Territory and joins the famous Naches Pass wagon train, where hardship and struggles demonstrate to the young pioneer family that nothing in life is really free at all. Her third book, Leschi of the Nisquallies, served as the source for the Indian fishing rights court trials. Emmons was adopted by the Lummi tribe and given the name "Selequal" (Maiden of the Great Calm). Emmons' final book, Jay Gould's Million Dollar Gems, details the life of her older brother, who was a master showman in Minnesota.

== Personal life ==
Della was born to William George Gould and Anna Wadel Gould in Glencoe, Minnesota. At the University of Minnesota Della prepared to teach languages but instead taught music and coached dramatics at Sisseton, South Dakota, adjacent to the Sioux Reservation before moving further west before finally settling in Seattle for nineteen years. Della Emmons served as curator for the Washington State Historical Society. She died in Tacoma on November 6, 1983, aged 93, and is buried at Mount Auburn Cemetery in Glencoe. Emmons was survived by her daughter, Kathryn Nettleblad of Seattle (1914–2010), and son, Allen Gould Emmons (born 1920) of Tacoma.
