= Jacques Prevel =

French poet

Jacques Marie Prevel (July 27, 1915, in Bolbec – May 27, 1951, in Sainte-Feyre) was a French poet. His real first name was Jacques, but he added 'Marie' not to be mistaken with Jacques Prévert, whose surname is pronounced in a very similar way. During the German occupation he lived in the famous Parisiene district Saint-Germain-des-Près.

Among his friends were the members of the Le Grand Jeu movement, René Daumal and Roger Gilbert-Lecomte, and also Antonin Artaud. Prevel considered Artaud his master, but Artaud admired Prevel's writings as well - he wrote about him (often "more portraying himself") and dictated his visions to him. Prevel also supplied Artaud with laudanum and opium. Prevel died of tuberculosis in the Sainte-Peyre hospital in the arms of his second love Jany.

== Bibliography ==
=== Poetry ===
"It will be essential to work until the end of times, to find again the Gesture and the Word.".

- Poèmes mortels (1945); Mortal poems
- Poèmes pour toute mémoire (1947); Poems for all the memory
- De colère et de haine (1950); From rage and hatred
- En dérive vers l’absolu (1952); On the crossroad to the absolute, posthumously

=== Diary ===
- En compagnie d'Antonin Artaud (1974); In the company of Antonin Artaud, posthumously
