= Lists of works of fiction made into feature films =

These are lists of works of fiction that have been made into feature films. The title of the work and the year it was published are both followed by the work’s author and the title of the film, and the year of the film. If a film has an alternate title based on geographical distribution, the title listed will be that of the widest distribution area.

== See also ==
- Lists of film source material
- List of non-fiction works made into feature films
