= List of films based on spy books =

A list of spy films that are based on books. If a book has been turned into both a film and a TV series (or TV film), then the TV series is included.

== Early USA ==
#	Film	Date	Director	Country	Source work	Author	Date	Type	TV	Date	Country
1	The Spy	1914	Otis Turner	United States	The Spy: A Tale of the Neutral Ground	James Fenimore Cooper	1821	Novel	-	-	-

== World War I ==
#	Film	Date	Director	Country	Source work	Author	Date	Type	TV	Date	Country
1	The Great Impersonation	1921	George Melford	United States	The Great Impersonation	E. Phillips Oppenheim	1920	Novel	-	-	-
2	The 39 Steps	1935	Alfred Hitchcock	UK	The Thirty-Nine Steps	John Buchan	1915	Novel	-	-	-
3	The Great Impersonation	1935	Alan Crosland	United States	The Great Impersonation	E. Phillips Oppenheim	1920	Novel	-	-	-
4	Secret Agent	1936	Alfred Hitchcock	UK	Ashenden: Or the British Agent	W. Somerset Maugham	1928	Novel	Ashenden	1991	UK
5	The Great Impersonation	1942	John Rawlins	United States	The Great Impersonation	E. Phillips Oppenheim	1920	Novel	-	-	-
6	The 39 Steps	1959	Ralph Thomas	UK	The Thirty-Nine Steps	John Buchan	1915	Novel	-	-	-
7	The 39 Steps	1978	Don Sharp	UK	The Thirty-Nine Steps	John Buchan	1915	Novel	-	-	-

== World War II ==
#	Film	Date	Director	Country	Source work	Author	Date	Type	TV	Date	Country
1	The Lady Vanishes &	1938	Alfred Hitchcock	UK	The Wheel Spins	Ethel Lina White	1936	Novel	-	-	-
2	They Met in the Dark	1943	Carl Lamac	UK	The Vanished Corpse	Anthony Gilbert		Novel	-	-	-
3	Above Suspicion	1943	Richard Thorpe	United States	Above Suspicion	Helen Clark MacInnes	1939	Novel	-	-	-
4	Decision Before Dawn	1951	Anatole Litvak	United States	Call It Treason	George Howe	1949	Novel	-	-	-
5	Carve Her Name with Pride	1958	Lewis Gilbert	UK	Carve Her Name with Pride	R.J. Minney		Novel	-	-	-
6	The Counterfeit Traitor	1962	George Seaton	United States	The Counterfeit Traitor	Alexander Klein		Novel	-	-	-
7	Eye of the Needle	1981	Richard Marquand	UK	Eye of the Needle	Ken Follett	1978	Novel	-	-	-
8	Fortunes of War *	1987	James Cellan Jones	UK	Fortunes of War	Olivia Manning	1960 & 1962	Novels	-	-	-
9	Shining Through	1992	David Seltzer	United States	Shining Through	Susan Isaacs	1978	Novel	-	-	-
10	Fall from Grace *	1994	Waris Hussein	UK	Fall from Grace	Larry Collins	1985	Novel	-	-	-
11	Enigma	2001	Michael Apted	United States, UK, Germany, & Netherlands	Enigma	Robert Harris	1995	Novel	-	-	-
12	Charlotte Gray	2001	Gillian Armstrong	UK	Charlotte Gray	Sebastian Faulks		Novel	-	-	-

- * BBC mini-series
- & pre-WWII

== Cold War ==
#	Film	Date	Director	Country	Source work	Author	Date	Type	TV	Date	Country
1	The Big Clock	1948	John Farrow	UK	The Big Clock	Kenneth Fearing	1946	Novel	-	-	-
2	Our Man in Havana	1959	Carol Reed	UK	Our Man in Havana	Graham Greene	1958	Novel	-	-	-
3	The Spy Who Came in from the Cold	1965	Martin Ritt	UK	The Spy Who Came in from the Cold	John le Carré	1963	Novel	-	-	-
4	The IPCRESS File	1965	Sidney J. Furie	UK	The IPCRESS File	Len Deighton	1962	Novel	-	-	-
5	The Quiller Memorandum	1966	Sidney J. Furie	UK	The Berlin Memorandum	Trevor Dudley Smith	1965	Novel	-	-	-
6	The Deadly Affair	1966	Sidney Lumet	UK	Call for the Dead	John le Carré	1961	Novel	-	-	-
7	The Odessa File	1974	Ronald Neame	UK	The Odessa File	Frederick Forsyth	1972	Novel	-	-	-
8	The Black Windmill	1974	Don Siegel	UK	Seven Days to a Killing	Clive Egleton	1973	Novel	-	-	-
9	Three Days of the Condor	1975	Sydney Pollack	United States	Six Days of the Condor	James Grady		Novel	-	-	-
10	Hopscotch	1980	Ronald Neame	United States	Hopscotch	Brian Garfield	1975	Novel	-	-	-
11	Firefox	1982	Clint Eastwood	United States	Firefox	Craig Thomas	1978	Novel	-	-	-
12	Tinker, Tailor, Soldier, Spy *	1979	Frances Alcock & John Irvin	UK	Tinker, Tailor, Soldier, Spy	John le Carré	1974	Novel	-	-	-
13	Smiley's People *	1982	Simon Langton	UK	Smiley's People	John le Carré	1979	Novel	-	-	-
14	The Osterman Weekend	1983	Sam Peckinpah	United States	The Osterman Weekend	Robert Ludlum	1972	Novel	-	-	-
15	The Little Drummer Girl	1984	George Roy Hill	United States	The Little Drummer Girl	John le Carré	1983	Novel	-	-	-
16	The Fourth Protocol	1987	John Mackenzie	United States	The Fourth Protocol	Frederick Forsyth	1984	Novel	-	-	-
17	No Way Out	1987	Roger Donaldson	United States	The Big Clock	Kenneth Fearing	1946	Novel	-	-	-
18	The Russia House	1990	Fred Schepisi	United States	The Russia House	John le Carré	1989	Novel	-	-	-
19	Patriot Games	1992	Phillip Noyce	United States	Patriot Games	Tom Clancy	1987	Novel	-	-	-
20	Clear and Present Danger	1994	Phillip Noyce	United States	Clear and Present Danger	Tom Clancy	1989	Novel	-	-	-
21	The Tailor of Panama	2001	John Boorman	United States	The Tailor of Panama	John le Carré	1996	Novel	-	-	-
22	The Sum of All Fears	2002	Phil Alden Robinson	United States	The Sum of All Fears	Tom Clancy	1991	Novel	-	-	-
23	The Bourne Identity	2002	Doug Liman	United States	The Bourne Identity	Robert Ludlum	1980	Novel	The Bourne Identity	1988	United States
24	The Bourne Supremacy	2004	Paul Greengrass	United States	The Bourne Supremacy	Robert Ludlum	1987	Novel	-	-	-
25	The Bourne Ultimatum	2007	Paul Greengrass	United States	The Bourne Ultimatum	Robert Ludlum	1990	Novel	-	-	-

* BBC mini-series

In March 2015, shooting wrapped on the film adaptation, Damascus Cover of Howard Kaplan's novel The Damascus Cover set in 1989 at the fall of the Berlin Wall, starring Jonathan Rhys Meyers, John Hurt, Jurgen Prochnow and Olivia Thirlby.

== Post-Cold War ==
#	Film	Date	Director	Country	Source work	Author	Date	Type	TV	Date	Country
1	Icon	2005	Charles Martin Smith	United States	Icon	Frederick Forsyth	1996	Novel	-	-	-
2	The Constant Gardener	2005	Fernando Meirelles	UK	The Constant Gardener	John le Carré	2001	Novel	-	-	-

== See also ==
- James Bond
- Matt Helm
- Jason Bourne
- Jack Ryan
- Harry Palmer
- Quiller
- George Smiley
- Spy film
- Spy fiction
- Espionage
- List of fiction works made into feature films
- List of films based on war books
