= Snow Leopard (disambiguation) =

The snow leopard is a type of large cat.

It may also refer to:

- Ang Rita Sherpa, a Nepali mountaineer nicknamed as "Snow Leopard"
- Kwame Nkrumah-Acheampong, a Ghanaian skier nicknamed as "Snow Leopard"
- Mac OS X Snow Leopard, the seventh major release of Apple's OS X operating system
- Obtusipalpis pardalis, an African moth, also known as snow leopard
- Snow Leopard (film), a 2023 Tibetan language film
- Snow Leopard award, a Soviet mountaineering award
- Snow Leopard awards, film awards awarded at the Asian World Film Festival in Los Angeles
- Snow Leopard Commando Unit, a special police unit of the People's Republic of China
- Snow Leopard Trust, an organisation working for the conservation of the snow leopard
- The Snow Leopard, a book by Peter Matthiessen
- The Snow Leopard (EP), an extended play by the rock band Shearwater

== See also ==
- Snow lion
