= Kevin Jarre =

American actor, screenwriter, film producer (1954–2011)

- Born: Kevin Noel Clark; August 6, 1954; Detroit, Michigan, U.S.
- Died: April 3, 2011 (aged 56); Santa Monica, California, U.S.
- Resting place: Westwood Village Memorial Park Cemetery
- Occupations: Screenwriter; producer; actor
- Parent(s): Laura Devon; Maurice Jarre (adoptive father)

Kevin Noel Jarre (August 6, 1954 – April 3, 2011) was an American screenwriter, actor, and film producer. He adopted the last name of his adoptive father, Maurice Jarre.

== Background and personal life ==
Jarre was born on August 6, 1954, in Detroit, Michigan, to actress Laura Devon and her second husband, Cleland B. Clark. After his parents divorced, he lived in Wyoming for a time with his father, whom he referred to as Hemingwayesque, and who had combined ranching and fashion photography. He then returned to Los Angeles with his mother, who was married at that time to actor Brian Kelly. In the mid-1960s, Devon subsequently married French composer Maurice Jarre, who adopted Kevin.

He was the step-brother of Jean-Michel Jarre and Stéfanie Jarre.

In the early 1990s, he had dated actress Lisa Zane; he had written the role of Josephine Marcus in Tombstone with her in mind.

On July 25, 2009, Jarre was arrested in Santa Monica for driving while intoxicated. His bail was set at $5,000.

== Career ==
In the 1960s, Jarre had small acting parts in the TV series Flipper. In England, while his father was scoring the film Ryan's Daughter, Kevin became a friend of writer-director David Lean, who encouraged him to take up screenwriting and directing, giving him the books James Boswell's Life of Johnson and Alan Moorehead's The Blue Nile and The White Nile.

In the 1980s, Jarre had written a story treatment that eventually became Rambo: First Blood Part II (1985), as Jarre later recalled in an interview in the documentary Tinsel - The Lost Movie About Hollywood:

I wrote the first draft of Rambo. And I just did it, I was living on dog food at the time and I, you know, I needed a gig and I wanted to finish a spec script I was writing. And you know, they called, Stallone called me in and they had this idea about what they should do in the sequel to First Blood and I said, "Well, how about if maybe he searches for POWs in Southeast Asia and back in Vietnam?" He said, "Great, let's do it."

He had a role in the short A Hero of Our Time (1985), directed by Michael Almereyda and based on Mikhail Lermontov's novel of the same title, and screened in the 1992 Sundance Film Festival. He also appeared in the film Gotham, the only movie directed by Lloyd Fonvielle.

Jarre had a profound interest in history since childhood. He was especially fascinated by the American Civil War, which led to his in-depth research of the 54th Massachusetts Regiment which inspired his screenplay for Glory (1989). He played a bit part as a quarrelsome soldier who picks a fight and later, as the 54th regiment heads for battle, yells, "Give 'em hell, 54th!" For his work on Glory, he was nominated for a Golden Globe Award for Best Screenplay and a WGA Award for Best Adapted Screenplay.

Jarre began directing Tombstone (1993) from his own screenplay, but he was fired a month into shooting and replaced by George P. Cosmatos. Jarre's scenes featuring Charlton Heston are still included in the finished film.

Jarre also wrote the screenplays for The Mummy (1999) and The Devil's Own (1997).

Jarre often worked as a script doctor, rewriting scripts, such as the 1997 movie The Jackal (for which Jarre served as a producer), among other films.

The screenplays of The Devil's Own, Tombstone, and The Mummy were published as novels in 1997, 1994, and 1999 respectively.

== Death ==
Jarre died on April 3, 2011, at his home in Santa Monica, California, of heart failure, at the age of 56.

== Filmography ==
Year	Film	Credit	Notes
1985	Rambo: First Blood Part II	Story	
1988	The Tracker	Writer	HBO television movie, also known as Dead or Alive in some countries
1989	Glory	Writer	
1993	Tombstone	Writer	Director of Charlton Heston scenes, Uncredited
1997	The Devil's Own	Writer	Co-wrote screenplay with David Aaron Cohen, Vincent Patrick, Terry George, Robert Mark Kamen
1997	The Jackal	Producer, Screenplay by	Uncredited Revision
1999	The Mummy	Story, executive producer	Co-wrote story with Lloyd Fonvielle and Stephen Sommers
2000	Rules of Engagement	Writer	Uncredited

=== Unrealized projects ===
Title and Description	Ref.
An adventure/redemption story "of Saint Paul set in modern L.A." that Jarre would have directed.	
Unproduced draft of The Alamo for Imagine Films.	
Blood Mark, screenplay co-written with Desmond Nakano that was going to be produced by James Jacks.	
A Civil War suspense story about Ward Hill Lamon, the friend and bodyguard of U.S. President Abraham Lincoln that would have been produced by Bill Pace and Ronnie Clemmer for Metro-Goldwyn-Mayer and United Artists.	
Dead of Summer	
Dracula, an adaptation of Bram Stoker's novel for Universal Pictures that was cancelled when Francis Ford Coppola made his own version.	.
Eternal War, an unproduced screenplay that was said to be based on a true story about high level government corruption.	
Father and Son (Valhalla's Wake)	
A film about the Hell's Angels that would have been directed by Steve De Jarnatt and starred Mickey Rourke.	
Golden Gate Iron, a screenplay that would have been directed by Derick Martini	
Hot Springs, a story assignment for Paramount Pictures.	
The original script for Judgment Night.	
A remake of The Magnificent Seven	
An unproduced draft of Navy Seals for Orion Pictures.	
Track Down, an unproduced screenplay written by Ron Mita and Jim McClain that Jarre was going to rewrite for Columbia Pictures.	
A film about the life and times of Wild Bill Hickok that he would have directed.	

=== Acting credits ===
Year	Film	Role	Notes
1985	A Hero of our Time	The Hero	Short
1988	Gotham	Tim	TV movie from Showtime
1989	Glory	10th Connecticut Soldier	(uncredited)
