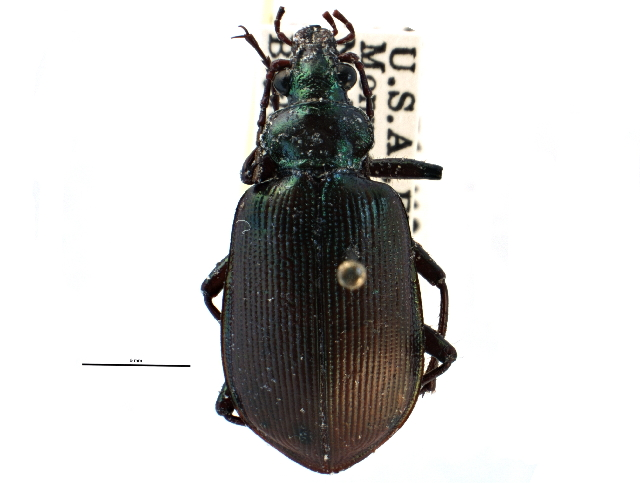

Scientific classification
- Kingdom: Animalia
- Phylum: Arthropoda
- Clade: Pancrustacea
- Class: Insecta
- Order: Coleoptera
- Suborder: Adephaga
- Family: Carabidae
- Genus: Calosoma
- Species: C. splendidum

Binomial name
- Calosoma splendidum Dejean, 1831

Synonyms
- Calosoma splendidum Breuning, 1927; Calosoma splendida Lapouge, 1932; Calodrepa splendidum Jeannel, 1940; Calosoma splendidum Gidaspow, 1959; Calosoma splendidum Erwin, 2007

= Calosoma splendidum =

Species of beetle

Calosoma splendidum, the splendid caterpillar hunter, is a species of ground beetle in the subfamily of Carabinae. It was described by the famous French entomologist Pierre François Marie Auguste Dejean in 1831, and is found in the Bahamas, the Dominican Republic and Haiti. It was also recorded from Guantánamo, Cuba, Floridian cities such as Chokoloskee, Deltona, and Key West. Besides the Caribbean and Florida, it was recorded from Clarke County, Georgia, Texas, and even the Yucatán Peninsula of Mexico. The species is 22–25 millimetres (0.87–0.98 in) long. The color of the upper body of C. splendidum is uniformly green, golden-green or light brown with green luster. It is easily distinguished from any other species of the subgenus Calodrepa because of the absence of red border on the lateral margin of the elytra.
