= Shadow Country =

2008 novel by Peter Matthiessen

- 1st Edition cover
- Author: Peter Matthiessen
- Original title: Shadow Country: A New Rendering of the Watson Legend
- Language: English
- Genre: Historical fiction, Southern Gothic
- Published: 2008 by Modern Library
- Publication place: United States
- Media type: Print (hardback & paperback), audiobook, ebook
- Pages: 912 p.
- Awards: 2008 National Book Award for Fiction
- ISBN: 978-0-6796-4019-6
- OCLC: 145431697
- Dewey Decimal: 813.54
- LC Class: PS3563.A8584

Shadow Country is a novel by Peter Matthiessen, published by Random House in 2008. Subtitled A New Rendering of the Watson Legend, it is a semi-fictional account of the life of Scottish-American Edgar "Bloody" Watson (1855–1910), a real Florida sugar cane planter and alleged outlaw who was killed by a posse of his neighbors in the remote Ten Thousand Islands region of southwest Florida.

Matthiessen revised, condensed, and combined his three previously published novels about Edgar Watson to create this single-volume novel, which is divided into three sections that conform to the three original books. Shadow Country won the National Book Award for Fiction in 2008 and the William Dean Howells Medal in 2010.

== Contents ==
Shadow Country is a reworked, re-edited, and retitled single-volume version of a trilogy published in the 1990s. The three parts of this book correspond to the three original novels: Killing Mr. Watson (1990), Lost Man's River (1997), and Bone By Bone (1999).

Matthiesen's original intention was to produce a single long novel, but his publisher balked at the length of the manuscript and published it as three separate books. Matthiessen was not entirely satisfied with the resulting works and continued to refine his original manuscript off and on for the next several years. The eventual publication of Shadow Country involved substantial editing and culling: while the three separately published books together numbered some 1,300 pages, Shadow Country would number around 900. Most of the cuts came from Lost Man's River.

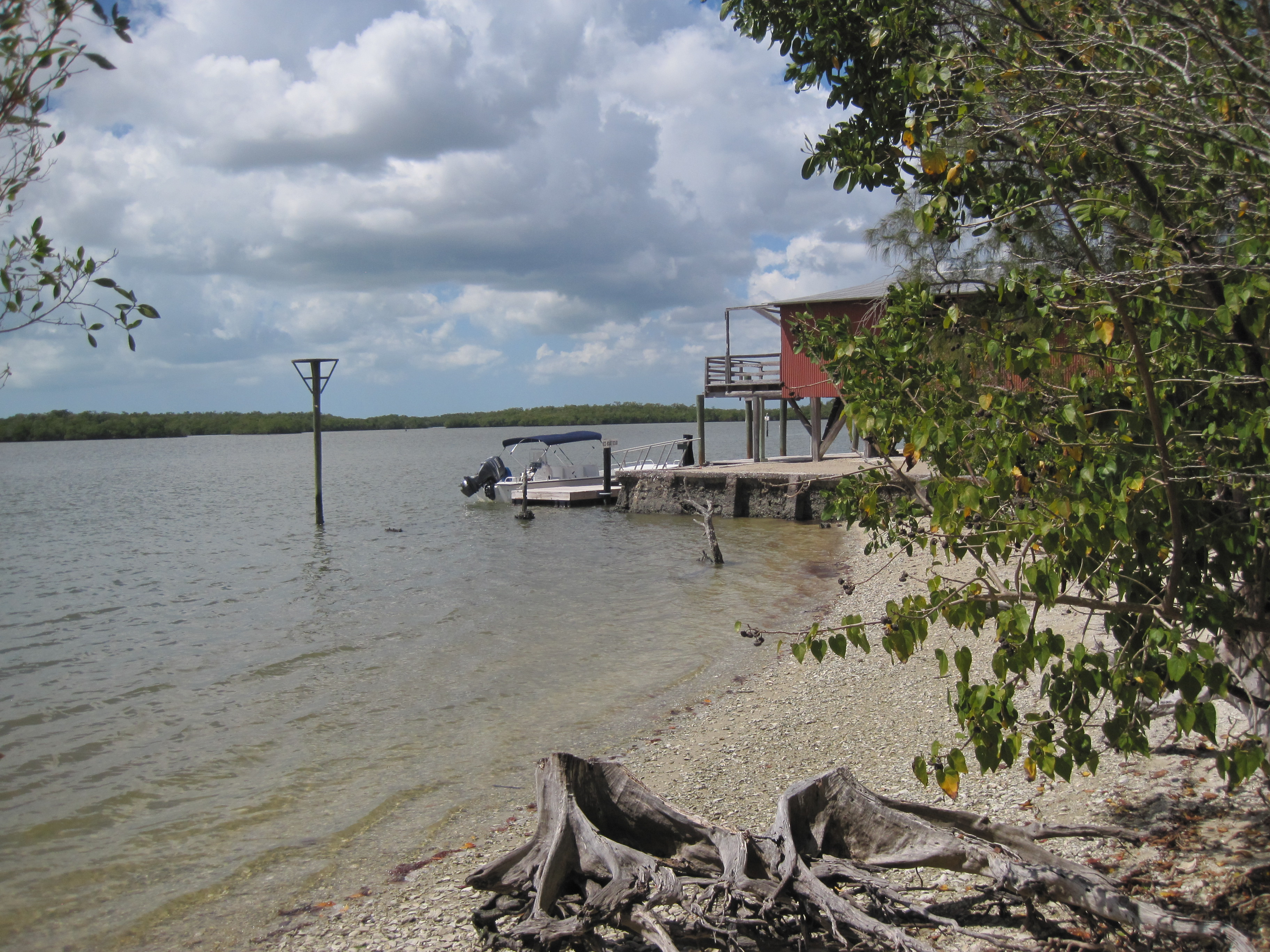
The landing behind the Ted Smallwood Store in Chokoloskee, Florida, site of Edgar Watson's death in Shadow Country and in real life

Book One is based on Killing Mr. Watson and is a collection of first-person narrative accounts of Edgar "Bloody" Watson's rise to power and eventual death at the hands of his neighbors. The book opens with Watson's death - his shooting by a local posse on the shores of Chokoloskee Island behind the Ted Smallwood Store. The rest of the book pieces together first-person accounts of 12 characters who recount the story from Watson's arrival in the Ten Thousand Islands in the early 1890s until his demise in 1910. Many of the "characters" who tell the story are based on real people who lived in the area at the time.

Book Two is based on Lost Man's River. It is set several years after Book One, and it tells the story of Lucius, one of Watson's sons and an alcoholic historian, who tries to reconstruct his father's life in an attempt to determine whether he was really a murderer and an outlaw. It is written as a third person narrative.

Book Three is based on Bone By Bone. In this first-person section, Edgar Watson tells his own life story, from his childhood in South Carolina to his fatal encounter with his neighbors on the edge of the Florida Everglades. By using this chronology, Matthiessen ends the book with the same scene in which it began told from opposite points of view.

== Reception ==
Michael Dirda was one of many critics who lavished praise on the work:

Shadow Country is altogether gripping, shocking, and brilliantly told, not just a tour de force in its stylistic range, but a "Great American Novel," as powerful a reading experience as nearly any in our literature. This magnificent, sad masterpiece about race, history, and defeated dreams can easily stand comparison with Ralph Ellison's Invisible Man and Robert Penn Warren's All the King's Men. Little wonder, too, that parts of the story of E.J. Watson call up comparisons with Dostoevsky, Conrad, and, inevitably, Faulkner. In every way, Shadow Country is a bravura performance, at once history, fiction, and myth—as well as the capstone to the career of one of the most admired and admirable writers of our time.

Tom LeClair, reviewing the work for the New York Times, considered that the work failed to live up to the sum total of its originally published parts, stating:

By reducing his Watson materials to one volume, Matthiessen has sacrificed qualities that gave those novels their powerful reinforcing illusions of authenticity and artlessness. Book I still has that Ten Thousand Islands quality, but "Shadow Country" as a whole is like the Tamiami Trail that crosses the Everglades. It offers a quicker and easier passage through the swamp, but fewer shades and shadows.

Tampa Bay Times book editor Colette Bancroft praised the book's wider theme and context:

Matthiessen is writing about one man's life in Shadow Country, but he is also writing about the life of the nation over the course of half a century. Watson's story is essentially the story of the American frontier, of the conquering of wild lands and people, and of what such empires cost. Most of the book is set in frontier Florida, a Florida virtually unimaginable in our air-conditioned, subdivided century. It is a brutally beautiful wilderness where, just 100 years ago, panthers and red wolves stalked the woods, plume hunters made fortunes wiping out whole species of birds and men like Watson made their own law. Shadow Country takes us there in unforgettable fashion. Even among a body of work as magnificent as Matthiessen's, this is his great book.

== Reviews ==
- "A History of Violence" at The New York Times
- "'Shadow Country' by Peter Matthiessen" at The Los Angeles Times
- "An Epic of the Everglades" at The New York Review of Books
- "Shadow Country: A New Rendering of the Watson Legend" at Orion Magazine
