= Far Tortuga =

1975 novel by Peter Matthiessen

- 1st ed. by Random House
- Author: Peter Matthiessen
- Language: English
- Genre: Literary fiction
- Publisher: Random House
- Publication date: 1975
- Publication place: United States
- Media type: Print (Hardcover & Paperback)
- Pages: 408 pp
- ISBN: 0-394-49461-X
- Dewey Decimal: 813/.5/4

Far Tortuga is a novel by American author Peter Matthiessen, first published in 1975 by Random House and republished in 1976 by Bantam. Known for its unique typography and poetic prose, the novel follows the story of a group of Caribbean turtle fishermen as they sail the waters of the Cayman Islands aboard the schooner Lillias Eden.

== Plot ==
The novel tells the story of a crew of nine turtle fishermen who venture out to sea in search of green turtles on the schooner Lillias Eden. Led by Captain Raib Avers, a veteran seaman, the journey is largely filled with arguments between crew members about the decline of traditional fishing ways, the weather and differences between the new and old generations. Three crew members eventually leave, and the remaining crew encounter severe weather, leading to the sinking of the Lillias Eden and the death of five of the six remaining crew.

== Development ==
Matthiessen began writing Far Tortuga in 1966 or 1967, taking eight years to complete. Matthiessen was initially meant to write an nonfiction article about Caribbean turtle fishing for The New Yorker titled "To The Miskito Bank" (1967), but later told his editor, William Shawn, that he wanted to write a book on it as well. To write the two pieces, he visited the Grand Cayman Island thrice and learned the local dialect to utilize it in the book. Unlike his previous books, he made minimal use of similes and metaphor. The experimental nature of the book's style brought Matthiessen into dispute with his editor at Random House, Joe Fox, who did not fully support the book. The book was published in 1975 by Random House, and republished in 1976 by Bantam Books. An excerpt was also published prior, in 1974, in The Paris Review.

== Style and themes ==
Far Tortuga is distinguished by its unconventional narrative style. Due to this, it has received the most discussion of Peter Matthiessen's books, and has been critically examined both as sea literature and as a form of pastoral. Matthiessen uses bare dialogue, and extensive use of white space to convey the expansiveness of the sea, and the "silence of the wind". The dialogue is interspersed by entries from the logbook, as well as illustrations and short snippets about the weather. Black splotches are used to mark the death of a character, and small circles at chapter breaks show the passage of time through the shape of the sun. The novel also incorporates local dialects to capture the voices of its Caymanian and Caribbean characters.

Thematically, the novel examines the consequences of technological development and conflict between the "back time" and "modern times". For example, Far Tortuga shows how the rise of "tourism, American economic imperialism [and] the race to get rich" lead to environmental exploitation and the erosion of traditional ways of life. The sails on the Eden are cut down and partially replaced by engines, and traditional ways of fishing are replaced by commercial fisheries, leading to a scarcity of turtles. Differences between the past and present frequently lead to disputes between crew members. Captain Avers laments the loss of the "de back times", and struggles to adapt to new technology, while another captain, Desmond Eden, adapts well and is representative of modern times, "profligate and wasteful", with disregard for the environment.

== Reception ==
Far Tortuga was well received by most critics, and is seen as Matthiessen's best work of fiction. Matthiessen also believed Far Tortuga to be his best book. Numerous critics highlighted the typographical choices made by Matthiessen and the design, done by Kenneth Miyamoto. Writing for The New York Review of Books, Thomas R. Edwards called the book "an adventure story of great purity and intensity", comparing it to the books of Joseph Conrad or Robert Louis Stevenson. Similarly, Kirkus Reviews wrote that it was "a sublime work of intense human drama – wonderful in a very literal sense of the word, lyrical, and it says good things about what humanity is." Marianne Wiggins, in the Los Angeles Times, favorably compared the book to Moby-Dick, praising Far Tortuga as "a novel so singular, so riffy in its many strains of individual human blues, so beautiful and original that it stood alone as something unlike anything I'd ever read." The comparison to Moby-Dick was also made by Bert Bender in an article for the journal American Literature, where he ranked Far Tortuga "second only to Moby-Dick among America's great sea novels." Robert Stone of The New York Times called the book "important, ... its pleasures are many and good for the soul", with "the author's joy in [the dialect] so infectious ... that its music comes to permeate the reader's consciousness as thoroughly as the wonderful descriptions."

In contrast to his colleague at The New York Times, Anatole Broyard gave a negative review, calling the book an "unrelieved bore" and criticized Matthiessen's characters and plot. Writing for The Nation, Charles R. Larson found the typography "fascinating", but noted that it eventually "made it difficult to become involved" in the story, and felt that it was worse than Matthiessen's previous novel, At Play in the Fields of the Lord. The Village Voice gave a two-page-long review heavily criticizing it, with the first reviewer assigned failing to even finish the "goddamn book", calling it "the most pretentious piece of crap I've ever seen". The second reviewer, Eliot Fremont-Smith, temporarily gave up on reading it normally, and instead read it backwards until he felt interest in the book. He felt that the positive reviewers were influenced by the book's design, which was "guaranteed to produce a couple of carps and a lot of windy and appreciative oration." Smith criticized the difficulty of the dialect, slowness of pace, aspects of the plot, but said that the major flaw was that the book was missing "intelligence". He concluded by calling the book "admirable, but a little dumb and not wrenching".
