= The Pope of Greenwich Village =

1984 US crime dark comedy film by Stuart Rosenberg

- Theatrical poster
- Directed by: Stuart Rosenberg
- Written by: Vincent Patrick
- Based on: The Pope of Greenwich Village by Vincent Patrick
- Produced by: Gene Kirkwood; Hawk Koch
- Starring: Eric Roberts; Mickey Rourke; Daryl Hannah; Geraldine Page; Kenneth McMillan; Burt Young
- Cinematography: John Bailey
- Edited by: Robert Brown
- Music by: Dave Grusin
- Production company: United Artists
- Distributed by: MGM/UA Entertainment Co.
- Release date: June 22, 1984
- Running time: 121 minutes
- Country: United States
- Language: English
- Budget: $8 million
- Box office: $6.8 million

The Pope of Greenwich Village is a 1984 American dramatic crime film directed by Stuart Rosenberg and starring Mickey Rourke, Eric Roberts, Daryl Hannah, Geraldine Page, Kenneth McMillan and Burt Young. Page was nominated for the Academy Award for Best Supporting Actress for her two-scene role. The film was adapted by screenwriter Vincent Patrick from his novel of the same name. The film focuses on two cousins who initially work as waiting staff in Greenwich Village. After getting fired, they orchestrate a safe-cracking plot which would allow them to finance their expensive tastes and manage their debts. Following the robbery, it is revealed that they just robbed a local mobster and pressure mounts on them from the criminal underworld.

== Plot ==
In an Italian neighborhood of Greenwich Village, cousins Charlie Moran, a maître d'hôtel with aspirations of someday owning his own restaurant, and Paulie Gibonni, a bungling schemer who works as a waiter, have expensive tastes but not much money. Paulie gets caught skimming checks, and he and Charlie are both fired. Now out of work and in debt, Charlie must find another way to pay his alimony, support his pregnant girlfriend Diane, and try to buy a restaurant.

Paulie comes to Charlie with a seemingly foolproof robbery idea involving a large amount of cash in the safe of a local business. Charlie reluctantly agrees to participate, and they manage to crack the safe with help from an accomplice, Barney, a clock repairman and locksmith. But things go sour, resulting in the accidental death of police officer Walter "Bunky" Ritter, who had been secretly taping "Bed Bug" Eddie Grant. Charlie soon learns that the money they stole belongs to Eddie.

The mob figures out that Paulie is involved, and not even his Uncle Pete, part of Eddie's crew, can help him. Eddie's henchmen cut off Paulie's left thumb as punishment.

Diane leaves Charlie and takes his money to support their unborn child, while Paulie is forced to work as a waiter for Eddie. He gives the mob Barney's name but initially refuses to identify Charlie as the third man involved. However, under pressure, he is forced to rat on his cousin. Barney leaves town and Charlie mails him his cut of the loot. When Charlie makes $20,000 on a horse, things begin to look up.

Charlie prepares for a showdown with Eddie, armed with a copy of the tape the police officer had made. But at the last moment, Paulie puts lye in Eddie's coffee, then he and Charlie casually walk away from Greenwich Village.

== Cast ==
- Eric Roberts as Paul "Paulie" Gibonni
- Mickey Rourke as Charles "Charlie" Moran
- Daryl Hannah as Diane
- Jack Kehoe as Walter "Bunky" Ritter
- Geraldine Page as Mrs. Ritter
- Kenneth McMillan as Barney
- M. Emmet Walsh as Burns
- Tony Musante as Pete
- John Finn as Ginty
- Burt Young as "Bed Bug" Edward "Eddie" Grant
- Tony Lip as Frankie

== Production ==
This film was originally planned as the first on-screen pairing of actors Robert De Niro and Al Pacino, with De Niro playing Charlie and Pacino playing Paulie. Michael Cimino was initially slated to direct the film. After Rourke and Roberts signed on as the leads, Cimino wanted to finesse the screenplay with some rewriting and restructuring. However, the rewriting would have taken Cimino beyond the mandated start date for shooting, so Cimino and MGM parted ways.

The film was released under the title Village Dreams in continental Europe.

== Reception ==
=== Box office ===
In the United States and Canada, The Pope of Greenwich Village grossed $6.8 million at the box office, against a budget of $8 million.

=== Critical response ===
On the review aggregator website Rotten Tomatoes, 77% of 30 critics' reviews are positive, with an average rating of 7.2/10. The website's consensus reads: "Undisciplined direction and a clichéd story prevent The Pope of Greenwich Village from achieving greatness, but it's an entertaining showcase for its stars." Metacritic, which uses a weighted average, assigned the film a score of 58 out of 100, based on 11 critics, indicating "mixed or average" reviews.

Roger Ebert of the Chicago Sun-Times gave the film three stars, saying, "It's worth seeing for the acting, and it's got some good laughs in it, and New York is colorfully observed, but don't tell me this movie is about human nature, because it's not; it's about acting."

Leonard Maltin gave the film three stars, describing it as a "Richly textured, sharply observant film... Page stands out in great supporting cast."

== See also ==
- List of American films of 1984

== Works cited ==
- Heard, Christopher (2006). "Chapter Six: Iconic Measures." Mickey Rourke: High and Low. London, England: Plexus Publishing Ltd. ISBN 9780859653862.
- Ebert, Roger (March 6, 1986). "Eric Roberts: Star 86". Chicago Sun-Times. Archived from the original on April 4, 2009.
