= At Play in the Fields of the Lord =

1991 film by Héctor Babenco

- Theatrical release poster
- Directed by: Héctor Babenco
- Screenplay by: Héctor Babenco; Jean-Claude Carrière; Vincent Patrick
- Based on: the novel At Play in the Fields of the Lord by Peter Matthiessen
- Produced by: Saul Zaentz
- Starring: Tom Berenger; John Lithgow; Daryl Hannah; Aidan Quinn; Tom Waits; Kathy Bates
- Cinematography: Lauro Escorel
- Edited by: William M. Anderson; Armen Minasian
- Music by: Zbigniew Preisner
- Distributed by: Universal Pictures
- Release date: December 6, 1991 (United States)
- Running time: 186 minutes
- Country: United States
- Language: English
- Budget: $36 million
- Box office: $1,342,903 (US)

At Play in the Fields of the Lord is a 1991 epic adventure drama film directed by Héctor Babenco, adapted from the 1965 novel of the same name by American author Peter Matthiessen. The screenplay was written by Babenco and Jean-Claude Carrière, and stars Tom Berenger, John Lithgow, Daryl Hannah, Aidan Quinn, Tom Waits, and Kathy Bates.

Director and producer James Cameron stated that At Play in the Fields of the Lord was used as a reference for the 2009 blockbuster film Avatar.

== Plot ==
A pair of explorers, Lewis Moon and Wolf, become stranded in Mãe de Deus (Portuguese: Mother of God), an outpost in the deep Brazilian Amazon River basin, after their plane runs out of fuel.

The local police commander wants the Niaruna tribe, living upriver, to move their village so they will not be killed by gold miners moving into the area and cause trouble for him with the provincial government. The commander cuts a deal with Moon: if he and his fellow mercenary bomb the Niaruna village from the air and drive the tribe away, they will be given enough fuel for their airplane and be allowed to leave.

Born-again Christian evangelist (and missionary) Martin Quarrier and his wife Hazel arrive with their son Billy, to spread the Christian gospel to the Niaruna. They arrive in Mãe de Deus to meet fellow missionaries Leslie and Andy Huben, who live with a Niaruna helper. In town, they meet a Catholic priest who wants to re-establish a mission to the Niaruna, as the previous missionary had been killed by them.

Moon and Wolf leave in their plane to attack the Niaruna. But upon seeing the community with his own eyes as well as a native American firing an arrow at the plane, Moon has second thoughts. The plane returns to Mãe de Deus.

That night, after a discussion with Wolf, Quarrier, and the priest, Moon takes a native drug and begins hallucinating. He takes off alone in his plane and parachutes into the Niaruna village. Moon, a half-Native American Cheyenne, aligns himself with the Niarunas. He is accepted as "Kisu-Mu", one of the Niaruna gods, and begins to adapt to Niaruna life and culture.

The four evangelists travel upriver to establish their mission. Native Americans originally converted by the Catholics turn up, awaiting the arrival of the Niaruna. Eventually they do come and accept the gifts that the Quarriers offer, not staying long.

Young Billy dies of blackwater fever (a serious complication of malaria), causing Hazel to lose her sanity. She is returned to Mãe de Deus. Martin becomes despondent, arguing with Leslie and gradually losing his faith.

Meanwhile, Moon encounters Andy swimming nude. After they kiss, Moon catches her cold. He returns to the Niaruna camp and inadvertently infects everyone. Much of the tribe becomes sick. Moon and the tribe's leaders go to the missionary Leslie to beg for drugs.

Leslie refuses, but Martin agrees to provide the drugs. He travels to the Niaruna village with the missionaries' young helper. In the village, after Martin speaks with Moon, helicopters arrive to begin bombing. Martin survives the bombing, but is killed by his helper soon after. Moon is exposed as a man and not a god. He runs, ending up alone.

== Cast ==
- Tom Berenger as Lewis Moon
- John Lithgow as Leslie Huben
- Daryl Hannah as Andy Huben
- Aidan Quinn as Martin Quarrier
- Kathy Bates as Hazel Quarrier
- Tom Waits as Wolf
- Stênio Garcia as Boronai
- Nelson Xavier as Father Xantes
- José Dumont as Commander Guzman
- Niilo Kivirinta as Billy Quarrier

== Background ==
Producer Saul Zaentz first tried to make this film in 1965. He discovered that MGM owned the rights to Peter Matthiessen's novel. Zaentz continued to try to buy the property every time there was a top executive change at MGM until 1989, when the new studio heads Jay Kanter and Alan Ladd, Jr. decided that MGM would not make the film. Zaentz then paid $1.4 million for the rights. In 1983, both Taylor Hackford and Keith Barish attempted to get the film, but the company would end up getting sued by MGM/UA Entertainment Co. for breaching an agreement to co-develop the film.

The picture was filmed in Belém, Pará, Brazil.

== Release ==
It was released to theaters in the U.S. on December 6, 1991.

== Home video ==
The film was released on VHS and Laserdisc in 1992.

It was available at one point in 2020, to buy or rent digitally (in standard definition only) via Google Play, Amazon Prime Video, and YouTube.

The film was released on DVD on September 26, 2023, by Mill Creek Entertainment. The disc contains a fullscreen 1.33:1 version of the film, along with another film, The Apostle.

== Critical reception ==
Review aggregator Rotten Tomatoes reported that 67% of critics gave the film a positive review, based on reviews from 9 critics.

Noted Chicago Sun Times critic Roger Ebert, who had read the novel and believed the film is true to its themes, awarded the film 3 and a half out of 4 stars. In his review, Ebert makes the case that producer Saul Zaentz has a history of producing "unfilmable" source material. He wrote, "Watching it, we are looking at a morality play about a world in which sincere people create unwitting mischief so that evil people can have their way. The movie essentially argues that all peoples have a right to worship their own gods without interference, but it goes further to observe that if your god lives in the land and the trees, then if we destroy your land, we kill your god. These messages are buried in the very fabric of the film, in the way it was shot, in its use of locations, and we are not told them, we absorb them."

Vincent Canby of The New York Times had mixed feelings about the film but did like the acting and the screenplay, and wrote, "At Play in the Fields of the Lord doesn't play smoothly, but it often plays well ... Mr. Lithgow and Miss Hannah, who grows more secure as an actress with every film, are fine in complex roles that are exceptionally well written ... Though the film features a spectacular penultimate sequence, it seems not to know how to end. It sort of drifts away, perhaps trying to soften its own well-earned pessimism."

Critic Jeffrey Westhoff writing for Northwest Herald expressed dislike for the film, stating, "Some books should remain books."

=== Awards ===
Wins

- Los Angeles Film Critics Association Awards: 1991 LAFCA Award; Best Music, Zbigniew Preisner

Nominations

- Golden Globe: Golden Globe; Best Original Score — Motion Picture, Zbigniew Preisner; 1991
