= African Silences =

1991 book by Peter Matthiessen

- Author: Peter Matthiessen
- Language: English
- Publisher: Knopf Doubleday Publishing Group
- Pages: 240pp
- ISBN: 9780307819673

African Silences is a 1991 book by Peter Matthiessen published by Random House. It recounts journeys through Equatorial Africa to study the situation of elephants and other wildlife and is a meditation upon the natural world and mankind's relationship to it and effect upon it.

== Content ==
The book recounts two sets of journeys: firstly, trips in the 1970s to Senegal, Gambia, and the Ivory Coast (with the primatologist Gilbert Boese) and secondly a 1986 trip to Gabon and Zaire. In different areas he explored different animals—for example, in Zaire, he was concerned primarily with the Congo peacock. Matthiessen observed that the situation in terms of animal populations and their sustainability was often far worse than anticipated—in certain cases "the animals are so scarce that they have no reality in daily life." The silence of the title refers to the silences caused by the absence of animals on the one hand and the growing absence of verdant forest away from the greater and greater proliferation of human urbanisation.

One element of slight optimism amongst the rather despairing reports of the 'silencing' of nature (which has an echo of Rachel Carson's Silent Spring) is the discussion of moves for an international ban on the ivory trade, which Matthiessen thought were influenced by the study conducted by him in collaboration with the ecologist David Western regarding the population of the forest elephant.

The book also has a political subtext, since Matthiessen also commented on the brutality of certain governments in the region, as well as discussing the environment and the natural world. Certain human groups are described in far more glowing terms, such as the Mbuti pygmies in the Ituri Forest.
