= Obtusipalpis rubricostalis =

Scientific classification
- Kingdom: Animalia
- Phylum: Arthropoda
- Class: Insecta
- Order: Lepidoptera
- Family: Crambidae
- Genus: Obtusipalpis
- Species: O. rubricostalis

Binomial name
- Obtusipalpis rubricostalis Marion, 1954

Species of moth

Obtusipalpis rubricostalis is a moth in the family Crambidae. It was described by Hubert Marion in 1954. It is found on Madagascar.
