= Family Business (1989 film) =

1989 film by Sidney Lumet

- Theatrical release poster
- Directed by: Sidney Lumet
- Written by: Vincent Patrick
- Produced by: Lawrence Gordon
- Starring: Sean Connery; Dustin Hoffman; Matthew Broderick; Rosanna DeSoto
- Cinematography: Andrzej Bartkowiak
- Edited by: Andrew Mondshein
- Music by: Cy Coleman
- Production companies: Gordon Company; Regency International Pictures
- Distributed by: Tri-Star Pictures
- Release date: December 15, 1989
- Running time: 110 minutes
- Country: United States
- Language: English
- Box office: $12.1 million

Family Business is a 1989 American neo-noir comedy drama crime film directed by Sidney Lumet based on the 1985 novel of the same name by Vincent Patrick, who also wrote the film's screenplay. It stars Sean Connery, Dustin Hoffman, and Matthew Broderick. Family Business was released by Tri-Star Pictures on December 15, 1989. The film received mixed to negative reviews from critics and grossed $12.1 million.

== Plot ==
Jessie McMullen, a Scottish-American widower who emigrated to New York with his Sicilian wife in 1946, is proud of his criminal lifestyle. He is disappointed that his son, Vito, left the life of crime when Vito's son, Adam, was born.

Ashamed of his family's past, Vito married and has tried to keep Adam away from his criminal grandfather. But the mystery surrounding Jessie, coupled with his strict upbringing, causes Adam to idolize his grandfather.

Adam is in college on an academic scholarship. However, six months before graduation, he drops out in rebellion against his father. Adam reveals his plan to steal valuable research (plasmids and a logbook) from a laboratory, which impresses Jessie but disappoints and frustrates Vito. Jessie is eager to enlist Vito to assist in the heist, and eventually convinces Vito to join in the robbery, which they nickname "The Caper."

During the heist, Adam accidentally sets off an alarm and is captured by the police, though Jessie and Vito escape.

Vito is heartbroken. He and Jessie hire an expensive lawyer for Adam's defense, but are told the only way for Adam to avoid a 15-year sentence is to name his accomplices and return the research he stole. Vito's wife, Elaine, demands that Vito and Jessie turn themselves in to protect Adam.

Discovering that the research they stole had been faked, Jessie demands payment for his silence from Adam's former professor Jimmy Chu, who had given Adam the idea for the robbery. Meanwhile, Vito returns the plasmids (actually water) and turns himself and Jessie into the police.

In court, a judge finds Jessie, Vito and Adam guilty. The judge places Vito and Adam on probation, but sentences Jessie to 15 years in prison. Adam regularly visits Jessie in prison while shunning Vito for turning Jessie in to the police.

Six months later Jessie dies in prison after admitting to Adam that it was his deal with Chu that saved him jail time, as well as spending all the money he got from Chu as well. Vito attempts to visit Jessie before his death, but arrives too late. Vito and Adam eventually reconcile. Together, they scatter Jessie's ashes from the roof of Vito's childhood home.

== Cast ==
- Sean Connery as Jessie
- Dustin Hoffman as Vito
- Matthew Broderick as Adam
- Rosanna DeSoto as Elaine (credited as Rosana DeSoto)
- Janet Carroll as Margie
- Victoria Jackson as Christine
- Bill McCutcheon as Doheny
- Deborah Rush as Michele Dempsey
- Rex Everhart as Ray Garvey
- James S. Tolkan as Judge
- Luis Guzmán as Torres
- BD Wong as Jimmy Chiu

== Reception ==
The movie was critically panned, with The New York Times stating that although "the three stars are good actors[,] they have nothing much to work with. Their biggest challenge is to make the audience believe they are blood relatives, a question that would be quickly dismissed if the script were more compelling. The screenplay also seems to have thrown Mr. Lumet off stride. Among other things, he is usually an efficient director. Family Business, however, is so full of waste space that it has not one but two Irish wakes, where stolen clothing is sold to the mourners who get drunk and sing Danny Boy, which is at least once too often."

The Los Angeles Times stated that it was "a frail little caper movie that's overawed by its cast. With Sean Connery, Dustin Hoffman, and Matthew Broderick playing three generations of a family, you've got a lot of talent at your disposal. Forget for the moment the fact that, in this movie about the persistence of family genes, none of the actors remotely resembles each other. Forget, too, that Dustin Hoffman is seven years younger than Connery, who plays his father here. Years of agent-inspired casting have inured audiences to weirder confabs than this. But there should be a pay-off to the oddness, some compelling dramatic reason for these three to get together. Like a good script, maybe. Instead, the movie lays out a slew of half-baked ideas and never turns on the burner."

Roger Ebert of the Chicago Sun-Times quipped in an otherwise positive 3-star review, "What does Sidney Lumet's 'Family Business' want to be? A caper movie, or a family drama? I ask because the movie seems to pursue both goals with equal success until about the three-quarter mark and then leaves leftover details of the caper hanging disconcertingly in midair."

On the review aggregator website Rotten Tomatoes, 35% of 17 critics' reviews are positive. Metacritic, which uses a weighted average, assigned the film a score of 54 out of 100, based on 17 critics, indicating "mixed or average" reviews. Audiences surveyed by CinemaScore gave the film a grade "B−" on scale of A+ to F.

=== Box office ===
The movie debuted at number 6. The film found greater success with video rentals.
