= End of the Earth: Voyage to Antarctica =

2004 book by Peter Matthiessen

Creating End of the Earth: Voyage to Antarctica
- Cover of the 2004 National Geographic edition
- Author: Peter Matthiessen
- Language: English
- Publisher: National Geographic Books
- Publication date: 2004

Creating End of the Earth: Voyage to Antarctica is a 2004 book by Peter Matthiessen published by National Geographic Books.

== Content ==
The book describes two journeys taken by Matthiessen to Antarctica: the first is embarked upon from Tierra del Fuego in South America to the Antarctic Peninsula west of the Weddell Sea and the second is from Tasmania to the Ross Sea. The second journey was, therefore, taken to a position that is almost on the other side of the continent of Antarctica. These two trips were made between 1998 and 2001.

Matthiessen discusses a wide range of topics relating to Antarctica, including the geological and hydrographic forces that historically led to the formation of the continent in the first place, the history (and environmental politics) of southern whaling, the details of many of its native species, and the vexed question of global warming and its effects on the continent as a whole (and, of course, its longevity). As an example, he discusses the problem of ice coming off the Larsen Ice Shelf as an example of the kind of problems that are currently occurring and may occur with more frequency in the future.
