= The Tracker (1988 film) =

1988 TV film

- Screenplay by: Kevin Jarre
- Directed by: John Guillermin
- Starring: Kris Kristofferson; Scott Wilson; Mark Moses; David Huddleston
- Theme music composer: Sylvester Levay
- Countries of origin: United States; United Kingdom
- Original language: English

Production
- Executive producer: Alan Trustman
- Producer: Lance Hool
- Production locations: Durango and Silverton Narrow Gauge Railroad, Colorado; Bonanza Creek Ranch - 15 Bonanza Creek Lane, Santa Fe, New Mexico; Diablo Canyon, Santa Fe, New Mexico; Eaves Movie Ranch - 105 Rancho Alegre Road, Santa Fe, New Mexico; Galisteo, New Mexico; San Ildefonso Pueblo, New Mexico
- Cinematography: George Tirl
- Running time: 98 minutes
- Production companies: HBO Pictures; ITC Entertainment

Original release
- Network: HBO
- Release: March 26, 1988

The Tracker, also known as Dead or Alive in some countries, is a 1988 Western television film directed by John Guillermin, written by Kevin Jarre, and starring Kris Kristofferson, Scott Wilson, Mark Moses, David Huddleston, John Quade and Don Swayze. It premiered on HBO on March 26, 1988.

It was the 36th and final film directed by Guillermin, before his death in 2015.

== Plot ==
Noble Adams served as a scout in the US Army during the Indian Wars. He resigns and takes his wife Lottie and two-year-old son Tom to a farm he has bought. On the way, Lottie dies in an accident. Tom receives a good education on the East Coast and studies law. After his exam, Tom returns to his father for a short time. One day, Noble is asked by his old friend Marshall Lane Crawford for help in the pursuit of the gang led by John Stillwell, who escaped from the Yuma penitentiary. The bandits murder some people and kidnap twelve year old Mary Bolton and Inez, an Indian. Tom wants to join the persecution. Noble is against it, because he is convinced Tom is not up to the strains of the persecution. However, Tom prevails. Noble, Tom and Crawford pursue the gang, on which a reward of $500 is exposed. They meet a group of bounty hunters who are deserted soldiers. During a sandstorm, the three seek cover behind rocks as best they can. Stillwell and his gang find shelter in a Pueblo (Indian village built into a rock). Because Noble knows that the bandits want to cross the river with the only ferry, they take a tiring shortcut. At the ferry, the bounty hunters get in their way. In the shooting, Stillwell kills Crawford.

There are frequent conflicts between Noble and Tom. Noble still lives in an atavistic world, in which he has a kill or be killed philosophy. Tom's behavior is shaped by the civilized East Coast. Noble and Tom set another trap for the gang. Noble kills all the gang members. Tom has been waiting for Stillwell. He has put his rifle on him and hesitates for a moment. Stillwell takes Mary to his horse. Tom can't shoot anymore. Noble and Tom meet as arranged with Indians, who bring them fresh horses and supplies. Mary's older sister Sarah and their father Hugh are also at this meeting point. Noble wants to free the girl alone and follows the trail. Tom suddenly knows where Stillwell will hide. It can only be the Pueblo. He rides straight there. Noble frees Mary and captures Stillwell. Stillwell distracts him with a trick and shoots him in the stomach with a hidden Derringer. Stillwell takes Mary on his horse and rides towards Utah. Tom arrives a short time later. Noble tells him that he is mortally wounded. Tom promises to free Mary. He catches up to Stillwell, who surrenders. When Stillwell tries to outsmart him with the same trick, Tom shoots him. When Tom returns to Noble, he dies shortly afterwards.

Tom loads Noble's coffin into a train. Mary and Sarah are also on the platform. He promises Sarah, with whom he grew up in his youth, to visit her in a few months.

== Cast ==
- Kris Kristofferson as Noble Adams
- Scott Wilson as John "Red Jack" Stillwell
- Mark Moses as Tom Adams
- David Huddleston as Lane Crawford
- John Quade as Lomax
- Don Swayze as Brewer
- Geoffrey Blake as Miller
- Leon Rippy as "Chub" Dumont
- Ernie Lively as Bob
- Karen Kopins as Sarah Bolton
- Celia Xavier as Inez
- Jeff Celentano as Lon
- Jennifer Snyder as Mary Bolton
- Brynn Thayer as Lottie Adams
- Jose Rey Toledo as Redondo
- Kip Allen as Cornishman
- John Barks as Drunk
- Michael D. Blum as The Bartender
- Forrest Broadley as Murdock
- Jake Dengel as Ethan
- Brook Gamble as Saloon Girl
- Jerry Gardner as Station Master
- Lois Geary as Station Master's Wife
- Ron Kathman as Conductor
- Phil Mead as Virginian
- Stephen Parks as Hugh Bolton
- Adan Sanchez as Mexican

== Production ==
The project began development under producer Lance Hool in 1983 with a script written by Kevin Jarre. The project then went into development for a couple of years until October 1987 when production began shooting on location in Colorado and New Mexico under the title Dead or Alive.

== Reception ==
The Wall Street Journal called it a " handsome, no-nonsense, no-spaghetti western."

The Chicago Tribune said "it's not bad at all."

The Globe and Mail said "The Kristofferson character is straight out of the Eastwood mold but even dirtier than Harry. But what makes him (and the movie) intriguing is his obvious tenderness for his grown son, wonderfully and endearingly played by Mark Moses. Their relationship gives the otherwise formula oater a much needed extra dimension."

An article on John Guillermin's career in Film Comment said the film "marks a surprising return to something resembling form." Another in FilmInk called it "a polite late '80s western... with some baddies kidnapping women and Kristofferson leading a posse, and his son learning the importance of killing people. The dust feels clean. Look, it's fine."
