= Gotham (film) =

1988 television film by Lloyd Fonvielle

- DVD cover
- Genre: Thriller
- Written by: Lloyd Fonvielle
- Directed by: Lloyd Fonvielle
- Starring: Tommy Lee Jones; Virginia Madsen; Frederic Forrest
- Music by: George Clinton
- Country of origin: United States
- Original language: English

Production
- Executive producers: Gerald I. Isenberg; Keith Addis
- Producer: David Latt
- Cinematography: Michael Chapman
- Editor: Evan Lottman
- Running time: 98 minutes
- Production companies: Phoenix Entertainment Group; Keith Addis & Associates

Original release
- Network: Showtime
- Release: August 21, 1988

Gotham, also known as The Dead Can't Lie, is a 1988 American thriller television film written and directed by Lloyd Fonvielle and starring Tommy Lee Jones and Virginia Madsen. The film aired on Showtime on August 21, 1988.

== Plot ==
Down-and-out New York detective Eddie Mallard finds himself involved in the weirdest case of his career when a wealthy man asks for his help in stopping his ex-wife from harassing him. Mallard finds that the case may be too much for him when he discovers that the woman died ten years ago – and that he is falling in love with her.

== Cast ==
- Tommy Lee Jones as Eddie Mallard
- Virginia Madsen as Rachel Carlyle
- Colin Bruce as Charlie Rand
- Denise Stephenson as Debbie
- Kevin Jarre as Tim
- Frederic Forrest as Father George
- J. B. White as Jimbo

== Production ==
Filming took place on location in New York City and Toronto.

== Release ==
Gotham premiered on Showtime on August 21, 1988.

== Reception ==
A reviewer for The Tampa Tribune criticized the film as "flat and dull".
