= Obtusipalpis citrina =

Scientific classification
- Kingdom: Animalia
- Phylum: Arthropoda
- Class: Insecta
- Order: Lepidoptera
- Family: Crambidae
- Genus: Obtusipalpis
- Species: O. citrina

Binomial name
- Obtusipalpis citrina H. Druce, 1902

Synonyms
- Eucallenia ragonoti E. Hering, 1903

Species of moth

Obtusipalpis citrina is a moth in the family Crambidae. It was described by Herbert Druce in 1902. It is found in Cameroon and the Gambia.
