= The Devil's Own =

1997 American action thriller film by Alan J. Pakula

- Theatrical release poster
- Directed by: Alan J. Pakula
- Screenplay by: David Aaron Cohen; Vincent Patrick; Kevin Jarre; Robert Mark Kamen (uncredited)
- Story by: Kevin Jarre
- Produced by: Lawrence Gordon; Robert F. Colesberry
- Starring: Harrison Ford; Brad Pitt; Margaret Colin; Rubén Blades; Treat Williams; George Hearn
- Cinematography: Gordon Willis
- Edited by: Tom Rolf; Dennis Virkler
- Music by: James Horner
- Production company: Columbia Pictures
- Distributed by: Sony Pictures Releasing
- Release dates: March 13, 1997 (New York City); March 26, 1997 (United States)
- Running time: 111 minutes
- Country: United States
- Language: English
- Budget: $86 million
- Box office: $140.8 million (worldwide)

The Devil's Own is a 1997 American action thriller film directed by Alan J. Pakula, starring Harrison Ford and Brad Pitt, with Margaret Colin, Rubén Blades, Treat Williams, and George Hearn in supporting roles. The plot revolves around Frankie McGuire, a soldier in the Provisional Irish Republican Army who comes to the United States to obtain black market anti-aircraft missiles, but his plan is complicated by Irish-American policeman Tom O'Meara, whom the IRA member has come to regard as family.

The film was released in the United States on March 26, 1997, by Columbia Pictures. It received mixed reviews from critics and was a box office disappointment in North America though it performed better overseas. This was the final film of director Pakula, who died the year after its release, and the final film photographed by Gordon Willis, who retired soon after.

== Plot ==
In 1972 Northern Ireland, eight-year-old Frankie McGuire witnesses his father gunned down for portraying republican sympathies.

Twenty years later in Belfast, Frankie and three fellow IRA members are ambushed by the British Army and Special Reconnaissance Unit agents. Two of the IRA gunmen are killed, but Frankie and his comrade Sean Phelan escape after managing to kill three soldiers, a civilian and four rival loyalists. Pursued by a British Army helicopter, Frankie's commander Martin MacDuff decides that the IRA needs Stinger missiles to fight back.

Under the alias "Rory Devaney", Frankie arrives in New York City to buy missiles. American Judge Peter Fitzsimmons, a longtime IRA supporter, arranges for him to stay with Irish-American NYPD Sergeant Tom O'Meara, his wife Sheila, and their three daughters on Staten Island. Believing that "Rory" is an immigrant construction worker, Tom and his family welcome Frankie into their home.

Sean reunites with Frankie, acquiring an old fishing boat to smuggle the missiles home. Frankie cuts a deal with black market arms dealer and Irish mobster Billy Burke to receive the missiles in several weeks time. Fitzsimmons has the money for the deal delivered to Frankie by Megan Doherty, another IRA operative posing as his family's nanny, and Frankie hides the duffel bag of cash in the O'Meara's basement. Megan later warns Frankie that MacDuff has been killed by British authorities and they must postpone the deal, much to Burke's displeasure.

After lying to protect his partner, Eddie Diaz, for fatally shooting an unarmed thief in the back, a guilt-stricken Tom decides to retire from the force. He comes clean to Sheila and they return home, only to be confronted by masked intruders. Frankie arrives and he and Tom fight off the intruders as Sheila calls the police, but they are held at gunpoint until sirens approach and the assailants flee. Frankie confronts Burke for sending his men to steal the money, shooting one of the attackers in the knee, but Burke reveals that he is holding Sean hostage and demands payment for the missiles.

Realizing that the intruders were searching Frankie's room in the basement, Tom discovers the duffel bag of cash. Confronted by Tom, Frankie reveals his true identity, but Tom has called Eddie and they arrest him. Stuck in traffic en route to the police station, Frankie overpowers Tom and takes his gun, mortally wounding Eddie when he draws his own gun, but is forced to flee without the money.

With Eddie dead, Tom is questioned by the FBI and their British counterparts and realizes that they intend to kill Frankie, who meets Burke at an abandoned warehouse. Demanding the money, Burke presents Frankie with the missiles as well as Sean's severed head, and Frankie hands over a duffel bag rigged with a bomb. The resulting explosion allows Frankie to kill Burke and his men, and he drives off with the missiles.

Frankie goes to Megan at the Fitzsimmons' residence, determined to complete his mission and deliver the missiles to Ireland. Downstairs, Tom interrupts a cocktail party and confronts the judge, before recognizing Megan from a photo in Frankie's bag, but Frankie escapes. Tom convinces Megan that only he can save Frankie from being killed by the authorities, and she directs him to the boat.

At the dock, Tom sneaks aboard as Frankie sets sail with the missiles, leading to a shootout. Tom is wounded and disarmed, and Frankie prepares to kill him but realizes he too has been shot. Tom embraces a dying Frankie, recognizing that they both were fighting for causes they believe in, before steering the boat back to shore.

== Cast ==
- Harrison Ford as Sergeant Tom O'Meara
- Brad Pitt as Francis "Frankie" McGuire / Rory Devaney
  - Shane Dunne as Young Frankie McGuire
- Margaret Colin as Sheila O'Meara
- Ruben Blades as Edwin Diaz
- Treat Williams as Billy Burke
- George Hearn as Judge Peter Fitzsimmons
- Mitchell Ryan as Deputy Chief Jim Kelly
- Natascha McElhone as Megan Doherty
- Paul Ronan as Sean Phelan
- Simon Jones as SAS Agent Harry Sloan
- Julia Stiles as Bridget O'Meara
- Ashley Carin as Morgan O'Meara
- Kelly Singer as Annie O'Meara
- David O'Hara as Martin MacDuff
- David Wilmot as Dessie
- Anthony Brophy as Gerard
- Martin Dunne as Mr. McGuire
- Gabrielle Reidy as Mrs. McGuire
- Malachy McCourt as Bishop Thomas
- Ciaran O'Reilly as Father Canlon
- Rob McElhenney as Kevin
- Victor Slezak as FBI Agent Evan Stanley
- Damien Leake as FBI Agent Art Fisher

== Production ==
=== Development ===
The film's origins date back to the early 1980s as a pitch by Lawrence Gordon and Robert F. Colesberry. The producers hired screenwriter Kevin Jarre to write the first draft; as Gordon recalled, "Jarre had disappeared for a couple of years and came back with a wonderful screenplay", which was an action-packed tale about a heroic operative of the Irish Republican Army. Gordon acquired the script in January 1990.

In 1991, Gordon took the script to Brad Pitt after seeing him in Thelma and Louise and A River Runs Through It. Pitt, who was not yet well known, read the script and enthusiastically signed on to the project, which Gordon recalled "was supposed to be a gritty, low-budget thriller with Brad as the only star". The project began moving forward towards pre-production at Universal Pictures, but was left at a standstill due to Pitt's lack of acting credits at the time, as well as the politically controversial subject matter on which the story was based.

In the ensuing years, interest in the project was renewed thanks to Pitt's performances in Se7en, Legends of the Fall, Interview with the Vampire and 12 Monkeys. The project was stuck in development at Universal before the studio put it into turnaround, eventually ending up at Columbia Pictures after Gordon and Pitt convinced studio chief Mark Canton to allocate an estimated $30 million for the production..

=== Casting ===
Despite having Pitt's name attached, the studio was of the opinion that he could not carry a major film alone. For the role of Tom O'Meara, both Gene Hackman and Sean Connery had been considered at various points, but at Pitt's suggestion, Harrison Ford was approached for the role, which at that time was more of a supporting character role. Ford read the script and agreed to play the part, though that meant the script had to be rewritten to create a fuller role for Ford and a more complicated relationship between the characters played by the two men.

Unsatisfied with Jarre's rewrite, producers brought in David Aaron Cohen and Vincent Patrick to rewrite the script and expand Ford's role. Patrick stated: "There was no way they were going to shoot the original script. It had to become a two-hero piece with equal action heroes. Supporting two stars is what this was about". Cohen added: "Take it from Columbia's perspective. Twenty million, and you want Harrison to be the supporting actor?"

James Gray was offered to direct the project but he turned it down, as did Bryan Singer and Milcho Manchevski. It was Pitt and Ford's suggestion to bring Alan J. Pakula in as director. Pakula initially turned it down, as he wanted to focus on other projects that he was developing at the time; he rejected the offer two more times, but eventually accepted the job after Columbia offered to pay him a fee of $5 million.

Pitt visited Belfast in preparation for the role and suffered bruises after he was attacked on the city's Falls Road after being identified as a Protestant..

Ford researched his role by meeting with members of the NYPD, joining them nearly a dozen times on routine patrol throughout various areas, including the Washington Heights section to get a feel for a patrolman's daily lifestyle, in addition to getting a better sense of the neighborhoods.

=== Filming ===
Principal photography began on February 5, 1996, with the script "still in flux"; according to The New York Times, "ego clashes, budget overruns and long delays plagued the project". Pitt "threatened to quit early in the shoot, complaining that the script was incomplete and incoherent" and later "denounced the movie as 'the most irresponsible bit of film making – if you can even call it that – that I've ever seen'".

To ease Pitt's frustrations, the producers hired screenwriter Terry George one week before principal photography was to start. George's primary purpose was to concentrate on helping further develop Pitt's character Frankie McGuire, and what the actor thought was a superficial outlook on the IRA situation.

In March 1996, Pakula hired screenwriter Robert Mark Kamen to provide rewrites during production. Kamen noted the difficulties on set: "They were running out of script to shoot. They had a script that wasn't acceptable to either actor. Alan [Pakula] didn't start with a script that everyone had signed off on, we were flying blind....It was scary".

Kamen met with both Ford and Pitt separately to discuss their ideas about improving the script, then he and Pakula would review the material, Pakula would add his own critical comments, and Kamen would go off to write the new scenes.

Contrary to the rumors that were reported at the time, Kamen insisted that both actors were agreeable to each other. "It wasn't the tension between them that made things tense. It was the tension each had with their own parts".

In June 2023, Ford admitted that he was partially at fault for the tension between him and Pitt, stating: "I understand why he wanted to stay with his point of view, and I wanted to stay with my point of view, or I was imposing my point of view, and it's fair to say that that's what Brad felt, it was complicated".

According to Pakula, one problem was that the film's plot did not fall along conventionally simple Hollywood lines, as Ford and Pitt were both playing "good guys" according to each of their own distinct moral codes. The New York Times characterized Ford's character as "the upright American cop who deplores violence" and Pitt's as "an I.R.A. gunman for whom violence is a reasonable solution to his people's 300 years of troubles". Pakula compared his intent with the two characters to that depicted in Red River, a 1948 western in which John Wayne's character Thomas Dunston is defied by his young protégé Matt Garth, played by Montgomery Clift.

The Devil's Own was filmed on location in New York City, and in Newark, Hoboken, Jersey City, Bayonne, Sandy Hook and Montclair, New Jersey and Greenport, New York on Long Island. Among the metropolitan location highlights were The Cloisters Museum at Fort Tryon Park, Brookdale campus of Hunter College, Isham Park, St. Barnabas Episcopal Church in Irvington, the Staten Island Ferry, Wollman Rink, The Old Town Bar, the shipyard in Red Hook, Piper's Kilt bar in The Bronx, the 1889 Bar & Grill, and the Waverly Coffee Shop, with sound stages utilized at Kaufman Astoria Studios in Queens, and in Hell's Kitchen, Park Slope, and Chelsea Piers, For security reasons, the Northern Ireland scenes were instead shot in the Republic of Ireland. The opening scenes were filmed at Port Oriel, Clogherhead, County Louth, Republic of Ireland. The Belfast shootout scenes were filmed in Inchicore, Dublin in July 1996. Other location shoots in Ireland were in the Wicklow Mountains.

Two months before it opened, the film was still unfinished: Pakula, unhappy with the final scene ("a showdown on a boat with a cargo of Stinger missiles"), called the actors and crew back for additional filming. The scene was "rewritten and reshot over two days at a studio in California".

== Reception ==
The Devil's Own received mixed reviews from critics. On review aggregator website Rotten Tomatoes, it has a 36% approval rating based on 42 reviews, with an average score of 5.2/10. On Metacritic, it has a score of 53 out of 100, based on reviews from 26 critics, indicating “mixed or average reviews.” Audiences polled by CinemaScore gave the film an average grade of "B−" on an A+ to F scale. On Amazon (Prime Video), audiences view the movie even more highly, with 1,172 reviewers giving it on average of 4.5 stars.

Roger Ebert gave the film 2½ stars out of 4, saying that it showed "ignorance of the history of Northern Ireland" and that "the issues involved between the two sides are never mentioned". The review criticized the contrived plot, stating: "The moral reasoning in the film is so confusing that only by completely sidestepping it can the plot work at all". Pitt and Ford were praised, with Ebert complimenting the pair, describing them as "enormously appealing and gifted actors, and to the degree that the movie works, it's because of them".

James Berardinelli gave the film 2½ stars out of 4, saying:

For much of its running length, The Devil's Own works as a passable thriller. Certain plot elements (including many of the details surrounding the missile deal) border on preposterous, but that often goes with the territory in films of this genre. The best parts of The Devil's Own are the quiet moments, such as when Frankie and Tom are talking, or when Tom is spending time with his family. There's also an effective subplot that forces Tom to examine his moral outlook on life when his partner (Rubén Blades) accidentally shoots a fleeing suspect in the back. Unfortunately, The Devil's Own goes downhill fast in the final half-hour. Suddenly, it's as if every significant character in the film has undergone a frontal lobotomy. Otherwise-intelligent men start doing extremely stupid things, and the entire "dumbing-down" process becomes frustrating to observe. The final scenes are solid, but the stuff that leads up to them is a problem.

Janet Maslin called it an "unexpectedly solid thriller" with a "first-rate, madly photogenic performance" by Pitt; she notes that it is "directed by Alan J. Pakula in a thoughtful urban style that recalls the vintage New York stories of Sidney Lumet" and "handsomely photographed by Gordon Willis". Richard Schickel called it "quite a good movie – a character-driven (as opposed to whammy-driven) suspense drama – dark, fatalistic and, within its melodramatically stretched terms, emotionally plausible"; he said Pakula "develops his story patiently, without letting its tensions unravel". Entertainment Weekly gave it a "B+," calling it a "quiet, absorbing, shades-of-gray drama, a kind of thriller meditation on the schism in Northern Ireland".

A reviewer for Salon called it "a disjointed, sluggish picture" with a problematic script that "bears the marks of tinkering": "swatches of the story appear to be missing, relationships aren't clearly defined, and characters aren't identified".

Variety said:

Whatever contortions the script went through on its way to the result, Pakula has managed to maintain an admirable concentration on the central moral equation, which posits the Irish terrorist's understandable political and emotional motivations for revenge versus the decent cop's sense of justice and the greater human good.

The film grossed $43 million in North America but it performed better overseas, earning $98 million which brings in the worldwide total of $140 million.

Brad Pitt's Belfast brogue was criticized by several reviewers. In 2024, the website Irish Central listed it as one of "The Worst Irish Accents in Hollywood Movies".

=== Cast and crew response ===
In retrospect, Brad Pitt said: "I really like Devil's Own. It was a good schooling for me. Still, I think the movie could have been better. Literally, the script got thrown out".

Harrison Ford is also very fond of the movie: "We had a real hard time making it, but Alan [Pakula] made, I think, a really good movie out of it".

=== British Royal family controversy ===
The film was involved in adverse publicity when, two months before her death, Diana, Princess of Wales took 15-year-old Prince William, and 12-year-old Prince Harry, to see the movie. The movie was restricted to movie-goers aged 15 or older, and the Princess persuaded the cinema to let Prince Harry stay despite him being three years underage. She was criticized for flouting the law, for using her influence to persuade the cinema's employees to flout the law, and because of the movie's subject matter (which was said to glamorize the IRA – highly sensitive given that her sons' great-uncle Earl Mountbatten was assassinated by the IRA). She later apologized, saying she had been unaware of the film's content.

== Novelization ==
A paperback novel of the film, written by Christopher Newman; it was published by Dell Publishing and released in 1998.
