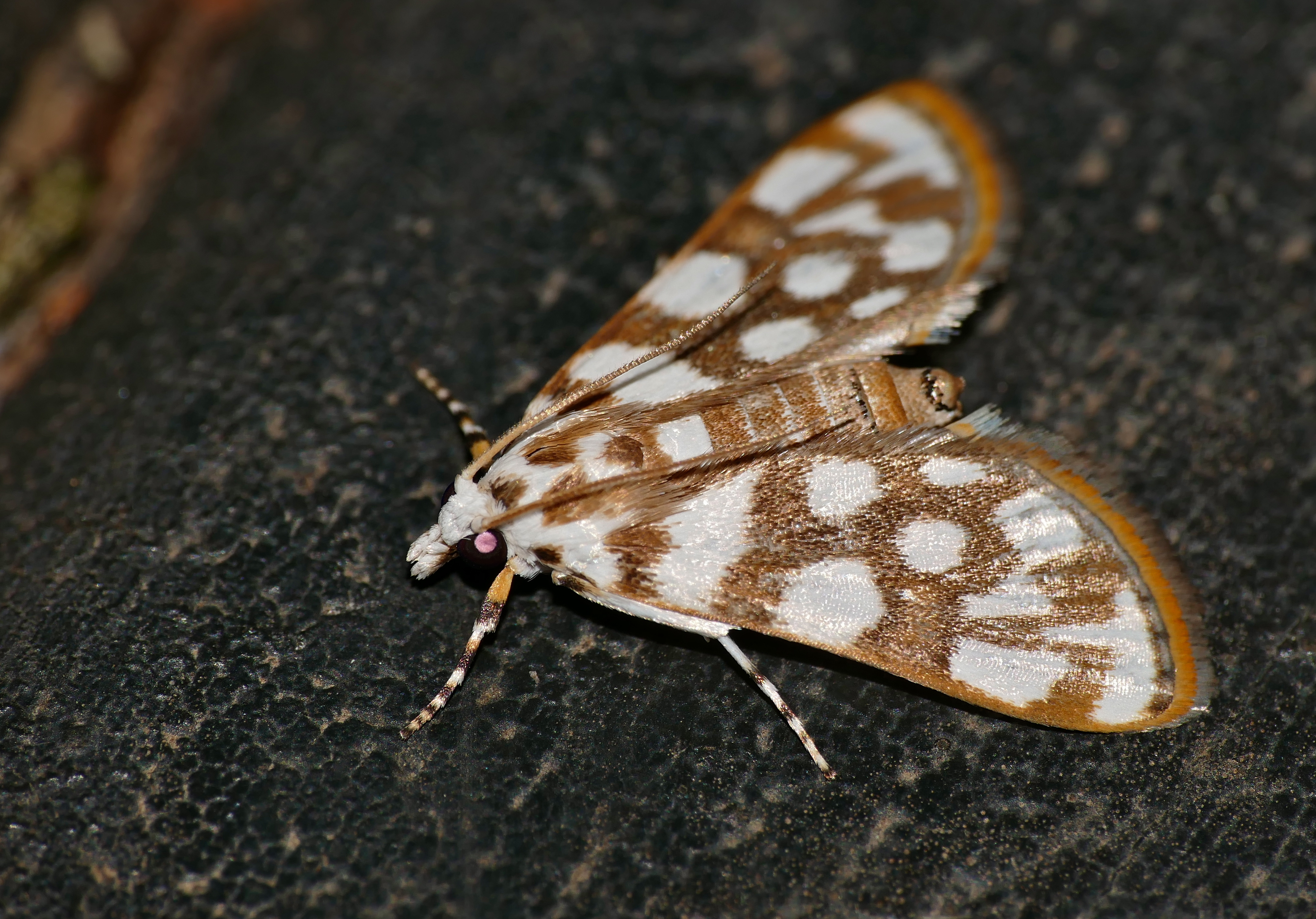
- Obtusipalpis pardalis

Scientific classification
- Kingdom: Animalia
- Phylum: Arthropoda
- Class: Insecta
- Order: Lepidoptera
- Family: Crambidae
- Tribe: Margaroniini
- Genus: Obtusipalpis; Hampson, 1896

= Obtusipalpis =

Genus of moths

Obtusipalpis is a genus of moths of the family Crambidae described by George Hampson in 1896.

== Species ==
- Obtusipalpis albidalis Hampson, 1919
- Obtusipalpis brunneata Hampson, 1919
- Obtusipalpis citrina Druce, 1902
- Obtusipalpis fusipartalis Hampson, 1919
- Obtusipalpis pardalis Hampson, 1896
- Obtusipalpis rubricostalis Marion, 1954
