= Obtusipalpis brunneata =

Scientific classification
- Kingdom: Animalia
- Phylum: Arthropoda
- Class: Insecta
- Order: Lepidoptera
- Family: Crambidae
- Genus: Obtusipalpis
- Species: O. brunneata

Binomial name
- Obtusipalpis brunneata Hampson, 1919

Species of moth

Obtusipalpis brunneata is a moth in the family Crambidae. It was described by George Hampson in 1919. It is found in Ethiopia, Madagascar and Nigeria.

The larvae feed on Ficus melleri.
