= Obtusipalpis albidalis =

Scientific classification
- Kingdom: Animalia
- Phylum: Arthropoda
- Class: Insecta
- Order: Lepidoptera
- Family: Crambidae
- Genus: Obtusipalpis
- Species: O. albidalis

Binomial name
- Obtusipalpis albidalis Hampson, 1919

Species of moth

Obtusipalpis albidalis is a moth in the family Crambidae. It was described by George Hampson in 1919. It is found in Ghana and Sierra Leone.
