= Blue Meridian =

1971 non-fiction book by Peter Matthiessen

Blue Meridian: The Search for the Great White Shark
- Author: Peter Matthiessen
- Language: English
- Subject: Great white sharks
- Genre: Nature
- Publisher: Random House
- Publication date: January 1, 1971
- Publication place: United States
- Pages: 204

Blue Meridian: The Search for the Great White Shark is a 1971 non-fiction nature book by the American author Peter Matthiessen. He writes of a 17-month expedition he undertook with Peter Gimbel to photograph great whites underwater. The book recounts, then, the production of the documentary Blue Water, White Death.
