= Vincent Patrick =

American novelist and screenwriter (1935–2023)

- Born: January 19, 1935; The Bronx, New York, U.S.
- Died: October 6, 2023 (aged 88); Manhattan, New York, U.S.
- Occupations: Author, screenwriter
- Notable work: The Pope of Greenwich Village; Family Business

Vincent Francis Patrick (January 19, 1935 – October 6, 2023) was an American author and screenwriter. He wrote the cult crime novels The Pope of Greenwich Village and Family Business, and adapted both novels for the screen. The Pope of Greenwich Village, directed by Stuart Rosenberg and starring Eric Roberts, Mickey Rourke and Daryl Hannah, was released in 1984. Family Business, directed by Sidney Lumet and starring Sean Connery, Dustin Hoffman and Matthew Broderick, was released in 1989. He also co-wrote The Devil's Own and wrote uncredited early treatments for films including Beverly Hills Cop and The Godfather Part III.

Patrick was born in the Bronx on January 19, 1935, the second of three children. He dropped out of Cardinal Hayes High School, married his wife in 1954, with whom he had two children, and began selling Bibles door-to-door. Patrick found the job dishonest, so he returned to his studies, earning a high school diploma and graduated from New York University with a degree in mechanical engineering. Patrick abandoned the profession in his mid-30s to take up writing.

Patrick died from complications of Lewy body dementia at his Manhattan home, on October 6, 2023, at the age of 88.

== Novels ==
- The Pope of Greenwich Village (1979)
- Family Business (1985)
- Smoke Screen (1999)

== Screenwriting credits ==
- Beverly Hills Cop (1984) (uncredited)
- The Pope of Greenwich Village (1984)
- Family Business (1989)
- The Godfather Part III (1990)
- At Play in the Fields of the Lord (1991)
- Money Train (1995)
- The Devil's Own (1997)
- To Serve and Protect (1999)
