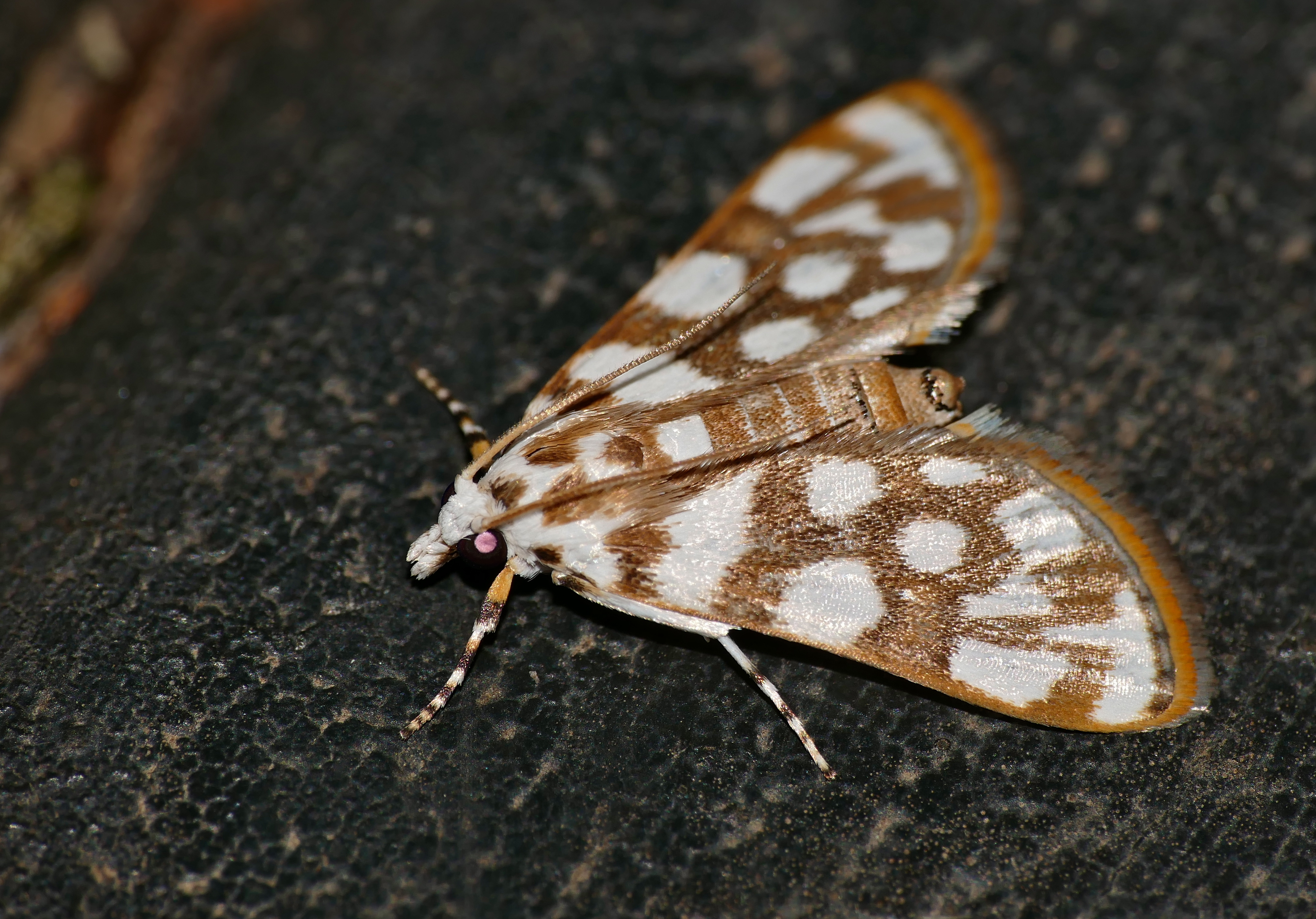

Scientific classification
- Kingdom: Animalia
- Phylum: Arthropoda
- Class: Insecta
- Order: Lepidoptera
- Family: Crambidae
- Genus: Obtusipalpis
- Species: O. pardalis

Binomial name
- Obtusipalpis pardalis Hampson, 1896

= Obtusipalpis pardalis =

Species of moth

Obtusipalpis pardalis, the snow leopard, is a moth in the family Crambidae. It was described by George Hampson in 1896. It is found in the Democratic Republic of the Congo (Katanga), Ethiopia, Mozambique and Zimbabwe.

The larvae feed on Ficus species and Euodia latifolia.
