= Peter Matthiessen =

American novelist (1927–2014)

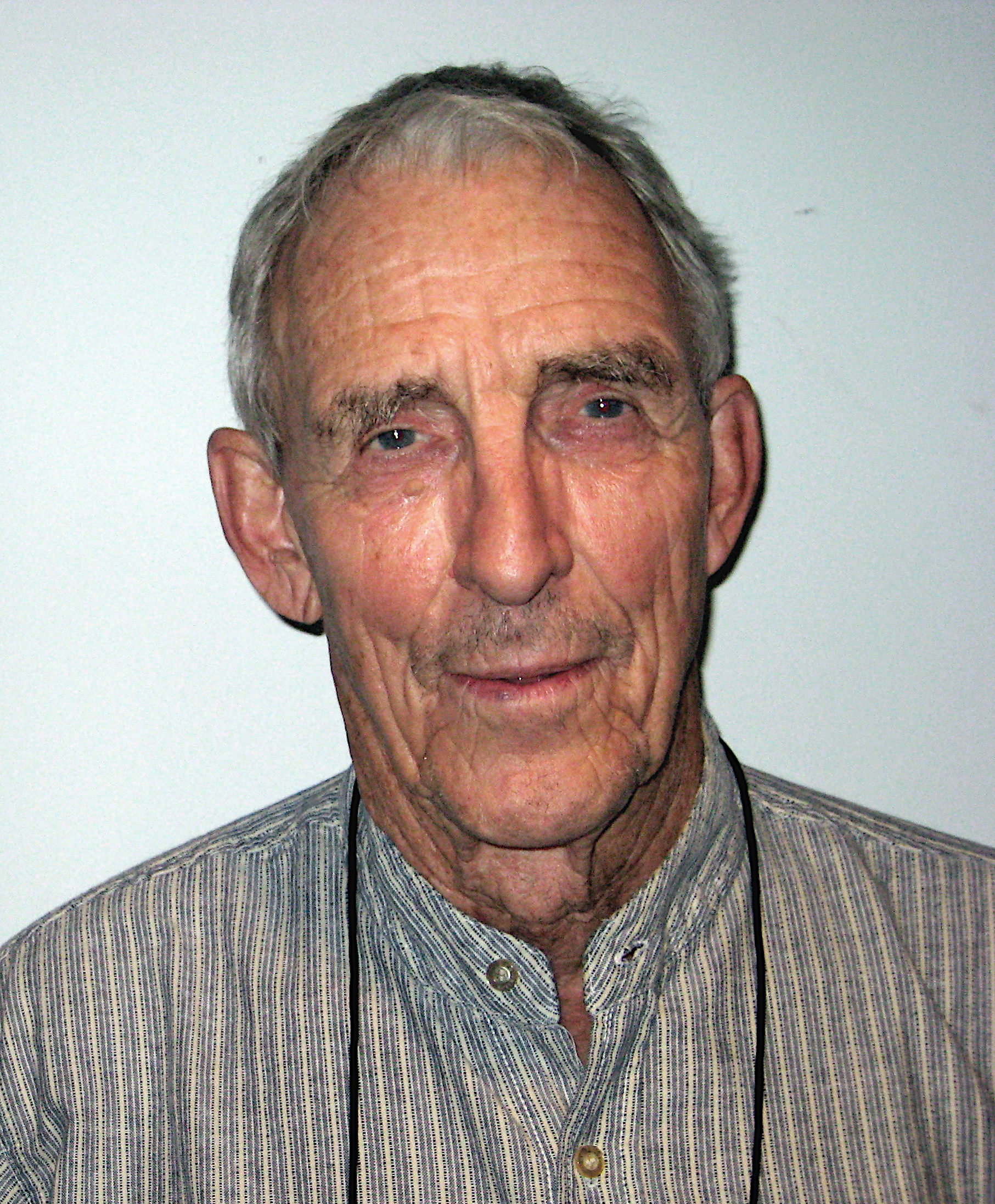
- Matthiessen in 2008
- Born: May 22, 1927; New York City, U.S.
- Died: April 5, 2014 (aged 86); Sagaponack, New York, U.S.
- Education: Yale University (BA)
- Occupation: Writer
- Spouses: Patsy Southgate (m. 1950; div. 1956) Deborah Love (m. 1963; died 1972) Maria Eckhart (m. 1980)
- Children: 4
- Writing career
- Language: English
- Period: 1950–2014
- Genres: Nature writing; travel writing; history; novels
- Notable works: The Snow Leopard; Shadow Country
- Notable awards: Heinz Award for Arts and Humanities (2000); National Book Award for Fiction (2008)

Peter Matthiessen (May 22, 1927 – April 5, 2014) was an American novelist, naturalist, wilderness writer, zen teacher, and onetime CIA agent. A co-founder of the literary magazine The Paris Review, he is the only writer to have won the National Book Award in both nonfiction (The Snow Leopard, 1979, category Contemporary Thought) and fiction (Shadow Country, 2008). He was also a prominent environmental activist.

Matthiessen's nonfiction featured nature and travel, notably The Snow Leopard (1978) and American Indian issues and history, such as a detailed and controversial study of the Leonard Peltier case, In the Spirit of Crazy Horse (1983). His fiction was adapted for film: the early story "Travelin' Man" was made into The Young One (1960) by Luis Buñuel and the novel At Play in the Fields of the Lord (1965) into the 1991 film of the same name.

In 2008, at age 81, Matthiessen received the National Book Award for Fiction for Shadow Country, a one-volume, 890-page revision of his three novels set in frontier Florida that had been published in the 1990s. According to critic Michael Dirda, "No one writes more lyrically [than Matthiessen] about animals or describes more movingly the spiritual experience of mountaintops, savannas, and the sea."

Matthiessen was treated for acute leukemia for more than a year. He died on April 5, 2014, three days before publication of his final book, the novel In Paradise on April 8.

== Early life ==
Matthiessen was born in New York City to Erard Adolph Matthiessen (1902–2000) and Elizabeth (née Carey). Erard, an architect, joined the Navy during World War II and helped design gunnery training devices. Later, he gave up architecture to become a spokesman and fund-raiser for the Audubon Society and the Nature Conservancy. The well-to-do family lived in both New York City and Connecticut where, along with his brother, Matthiessen developed a love of animals that influenced his future work as a wildlife writer and naturalist. He attended St. Bernard's School, the Hotchkiss School, and — after briefly serving in the U.S. Navy (1945–47) – Yale University (B.A., 1950), with his junior year spent at the Sorbonne. At Yale, he majored in English, published short stories (one of which won the prestigious Atlantic Prize), and studied zoology.

== Paris Review and CIA ==
Marrying and resolving to undertake a writer's career, he soon moved back to Paris, where he associated with other expatriate American writers such as William Styron, James Baldwin and Irwin Shaw. There, in 1953, he became one of the founders, along with Harold L. Humes, Thomas Guinzburg, Donald Hall, Ben Morreale, and George Plimpton, of the renowned literary magazine The Paris Review. As revealed in a 2006 film, he was working for the U.S. Central Intelligence Agency (CIA) at the time, using the Review as his cover. In a 2008 interview with Charlie Rose, Matthiessen stated that he "invented The Paris Review as cover" for his CIA activities. He completed his novel Partisans while employed by the CIA. He returned to the U.S. in 1954, leaving Plimpton (a childhood friend) in charge of the Review. Matthiessen divorced in 1956 and began traveling extensively.

== Writings ==
In 1959, Matthiessen published the first edition of Wildlife in America, a history of the extinction and endangerment of animal and bird species as a consequence of human settlement, throughout North American history, and of the human effort to protect endangered species.

In 1965, Matthiessen published At Play in the Fields of the Lord, a novel about a group of American missionaries and their encounter with a South American indigenous tribe. The book was adapted into the film of the same name in 1991. In 1968, he signed the "Writers and Editors War Tax Protest" pledge, vowing to refuse tax payments in protest against the Vietnam War. His work on oceanographic research, Blue Meridian, with photographer Peter A. Lake, documented the making of the film Blue Water, White Death (1971), directed by Peter Gimbel and Jim Lipscomb.

Late in 1973, Matthiessen joined field biologist George Schaller on an expedition in the Himalaya Mountains, which was the basis for The Snow Leopard (1978), his double award-winner. Interested in the Wounded Knee Incident and the 1976 trial and conviction of Leonard Peltier, an American Indian Movement activist, Matthiessen wrote a non-fiction account, In the Spirit of Crazy Horse (1983).

In 2008, Matthiessen revisited his trilogy of Florida novels published during the 1990s: Killing Mr. Watson (1990), Lost Man's River (1997) and Bone by Bone (1999), inspired by the frontier years of South Florida and the death of planter Edgar J. Watson shortly after the Southwest Florida Hurricane of 1910. He revised and edited the three books, which had originated as one 1,500-page manuscript, which eventually yielded the award-winning single-volume Shadow Country.

While Matthiessen is celebrated for his mastery of both fiction and non-fiction, he always considered himself first and foremost a writer of novels, saying, "Like anything that one makes well with one's own hands, writing good nonfiction prose can be profoundly satisfying. Yet after a day of arranging my research, my set of facts, I feel stale and drained, whereas I am energized by fiction. Deep in a novel, one scarcely knows what may surface next, let alone where it comes from. In abandoning oneself to the free creation of something never beheld on earth, one feels almost delirious with a strange joy."

== Crazy Horse lawsuits ==
Shortly after the 1983 publication of In the Spirit of Crazy Horse, Matthiessen and his publisher Viking Penguin were sued for libel by David Price, a Federal Bureau of Investigation agent, and William J. Janklow, the former South Dakota governor. The plaintiffs sought over $49 million in damages; Janklow also sued to have all copies of the book withdrawn from bookstores. After four years of litigation, Federal District Court Judge Diana E. Murphy dismissed Price's lawsuit, upholding Matthiessen's "freedom to develop a thesis, conduct research in an effort to support the thesis, and to publish an entirely one-sided view of people and events." In the Janklow case, a South Dakota court also ruled for Matthiessen. Both cases were appealed. In 1990, the Supreme Court refused to hear Price's arguments, effectively ending his appeal. The South Dakota Supreme Court dismissed Janklow's case the same year. With the lawsuits concluded, the paperback edition of the book was finally published in 1992.

== Personal life ==
After graduating from Yale in 1950, Matthiessen became engaged to Patsy Southgate, a Smith graduate whose father had been the chief of protocol in Roosevelt's White House. Matthiessen and Southgate had two children together. They divorced in 1956.

In 1963 he married the writer Deborah Love. They lived in Sagaponack, NY. He adopted her daughter, writer Rue Matthiessen. In 1964, Alex Matthiessen, an environmentalist, was born. In his book The Snow Leopard, Matthiessen reported having had a somewhat tempestuous on-again off-again relationship with his wife Deborah, culminating in a deep commitment to each other made shortly before she was diagnosed with cancer. Matthiessen and Deborah practiced Zen Buddhism. She died in New York City in January 1972.

In September of the following year came the field trip to Himalayan Nepal. Matthiessen later became a Buddhist priest of the White Plum Asanga, receiving dharma transmission from Bernard Glassman in 1984. He gave dharma transmission to three students: Sensei Madeline Ko-I Bastis, Sensei Michel Engu Dobbs, and Sensei Dorothy Dai-En Friedman. Before practicing Zen, Matthiessen was an early pioneer of LSD. He said his Buddhism evolved fairly naturally from his drug experiences. He argued that it was unfortunate that LSD had become outlawed over time, given its potentially beneficial effects as a spiritual and therapeutic tool (when administered with the right care and attention) and was critical of a figure such as Timothy Leary in terms of the long-term reputation of the drug.

In 1980, Matthiessen married Maria Eckhart, born in Tanzania, in a Zen ceremony on Long Island, New York. They lived in Sagaponack, New York. Eckhart is the mother of Serial host and Executive Producer Sarah Koenig, who was 10 or 11 years old at the time of the marriage. In 1989, Matthiessen published an autobiographical essay wherein he traced his ancestry to North Frisian shipmaster and whaling captain Matthias Petersen (1632–1706).

=== Illness and death ===
Matthiessen was diagnosed with leukemia in late 2012. He died at his home in Sagaponack on April 5, 2014, aged 86.

== Awards ==
- 1979 National Book Award, Contemporary Thought, for The Snow Leopard
- 1980 National Book Award, General Non-Fiction (paperback), for The Snow Leopard (Note: Dual awards for hardcover and paperback books were conferred from 1980 to 1983, when both Fiction and Nonfiction were also subdivided in other ways. Most of the roughly 30 award-winning paperbacks were reprints; The Snow Leopard alone won awards in both its first hardcover and its first paperback editions.)
- 1991 Golden Plate Award of the American Academy of Achievement
- 1993 Helmerich Award, the Peggy V. Helmerich Distinguished Author Award is presented annually by the Tulsa Library Trust.
- 1995–97, designated the State Author of New York
- 2000 6th annual Heinz Award in the Arts and Humanities
- 2008 National Book Award, Fiction, for Shadow Country
- 2010 Spiros Vergos Prize for Freedom of Expression
- 2010 William Dean Howells Medal, for Shadow Country

== Works ==
=== Fiction ===
- Race Rock (1954) ISBN 0394745388
- Partisans (1955) ISBN 0394753429
- Raditzer (1961)
- At Play in the Fields of the Lord (1965)
- Far Tortuga (1975) ISBN 0394756673
- Midnight Turning Gray: Short Stories (1984)
- On the River Styx and Other Stories (1989) ISBN 0394553993
- The Watson trilogy
  - Killing Mister Watson (1990) ISBN 0394554000
  - Lost Man's River (1997) ISBN 067973564X
  - Bone by Bone (1999) ISBN 0375501029
- Shadow Country: a new rendering of the Watson legend (2008) ISBN 081298062X
- In Paradise (2014) ISBN 1594633525

=== Nonfiction ===
- Wildlife in America (1959) ISBN 014004793X
- The Cloud Forest: A Chronicle of the South American Wilderness (1961) ISBN 0140255079
- Under the Mountain Wall: A Chronicle of Two Seasons in the Stone Age (1962) ISBN 9780140252705
- "The Atlantic Coast", a chapter in The American Heritage Book of Natural Wonders (1963)
- The Shorebirds of North America (1967) ISBN 1881527379
- Oomingmak: The Expedition to the Musk Ox Island in the Bering Sea (1967)
- Sal Si Puedes: Cesar Chavez and the New American Revolution (1969) ISBN 0520282507
- Blue Meridian: The Search for the Great White Shark (1971). ISBN 9780140265132
- The Tree Where Man Was Born (1972) ISBN 0525222650
- The Snow Leopard (1978) ISBN 0143105515
- Sand Rivers, with photographer Hugo van Lawick. Aurum Press, London 1981, ISBN 0-906053-22-6.
- In the Spirit of Crazy Horse (1983) ISBN 0-14-014456-0.
- Indian Country (1984). ISBN 0670397873
- Nine-headed Dragon River: Zen Journals 1969–1982 (1986). ISBN 1570623678
- Men's Lives: The Surfmen and Baymen of the South Fork (1986). ISBN 039475560X
- African Silences (1991). ISBN 9780679731023
- Baikal: Sacred Sea of Siberia (1992). ISBN 0871563584
- East of Lo Monthang: In the Land of Mustang (1995). ISBN 1570621314
- The Peter Matthiessen Reader: Nonfiction, 1959–1961 (2000).
- Tigers in the Snow (2000). ISBN 0865475768
- The Birds of Heaven: Travels With Cranes (2001). ISBN 0865476578
- End of the Earth: Voyage to Antarctica (2003). ISBN 0792250591

=== Short stories ===
| Title | Publication | Collected in |
|---|---|---|
| "Sadie" | The Atlantic (January 1951) | Midnight Turning Gray; On the River Styx |
| "The Fifth Day" | The Atlantic (September 1951) | Midnight Turning Gray; On the River Styx |
| "The Tower of the Four Winds" | The Cornhill Magazine (Summer 1952) | - |
| "Martin's Beach" | Botteghe Oscure (1952) | - |
| "A Replacement" | The Paris Review 1 (Spring 1953) | Midnight Turning Gray |
| "Late in the Season" | New World Writing 3 (May 1953) | Midnight Turning Gray; On the River Styx |
| "Lina" | The Cornhill Magazine (Autumn 1956) | - |
| "Travelin Man" | Harper's (February 1957) | Midnight Turning Gray; On the River Styx |
| "The Wolves of Aguila" | Harper's Bazaar (August 1958) | Midnight Turning Gray; On the River Styx |
| "Midnight Turning Gray" | The Saturday Evening Post (September 28, 1963) | Midnight Turning Gray; On the River Styx |
| "Horse Latitudes" aka "Horace and Hassid" | Venture: The Traveler's World (October 1964) | On the River Styx |
| "On the River Styx" | Esquire (August 1985) | On the River Styx |
| "Lumumba Lives" | Wigwag (Summer 1988) | On the River Styx |
| "The Centerpiece" | On the River Styx and Other Stories (1989) | On the River Styx |
| "Speck in the Glades" | Esquire (July 1993) | from Shadow Country |
