= Ted Smallwood Store =

- U.S. National Register of Historic Places
- The store in 2019

- Location within Florida Location within the United States
- Location: Chokoloskee, Florida
- Coordinates: 25°48′46″N 81°21′45″W
- Area: 9.9 acres (4.0 ha)
- NRHP reference No.: 74000612
- Added to NRHP: July 24, 1974

The Ted Smallwood Store (also known as the Smallwood's Trading Post or the Ole Indian Trading Post and Museum) is a historic store in Chokoloskee, Florida.

== History ==
C.S. "Ted" Smallwood came to Chokoloskee Island as a permanent settler in 1897 and became postmaster in 1906, operating the post office from his home. In 1917, Smallwood built the general store that also served as post office for the residents of Chokoloskee Island. It is located at SR 29 in Everglades National Park. On July 24, 1974, it was added to the U.S. National Register of Historic Places. Today, the store has been preserved as a museum with many original goods and fixtures. However, it is at risk from property developers.

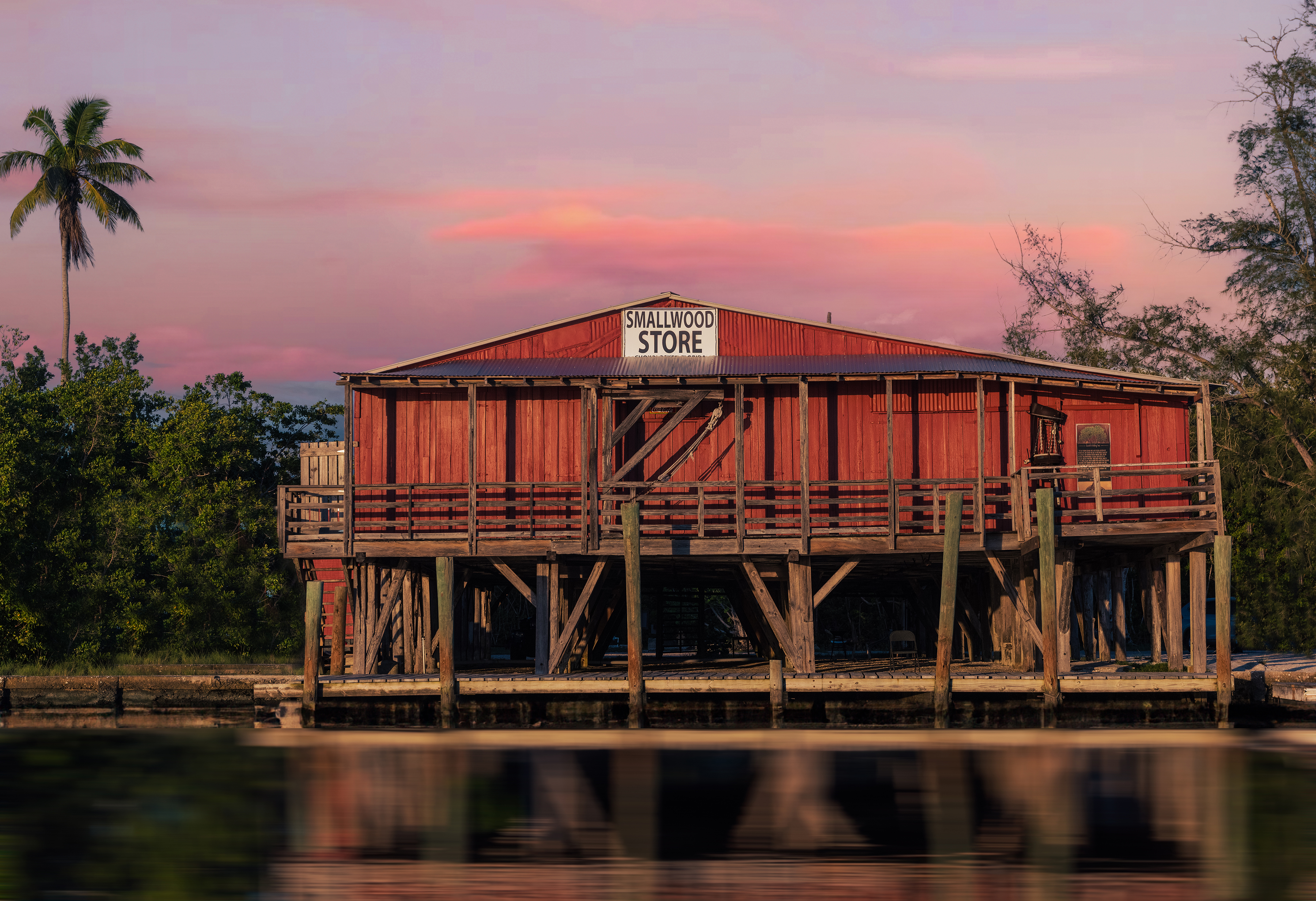
Ted Smallwood Store at Sunset

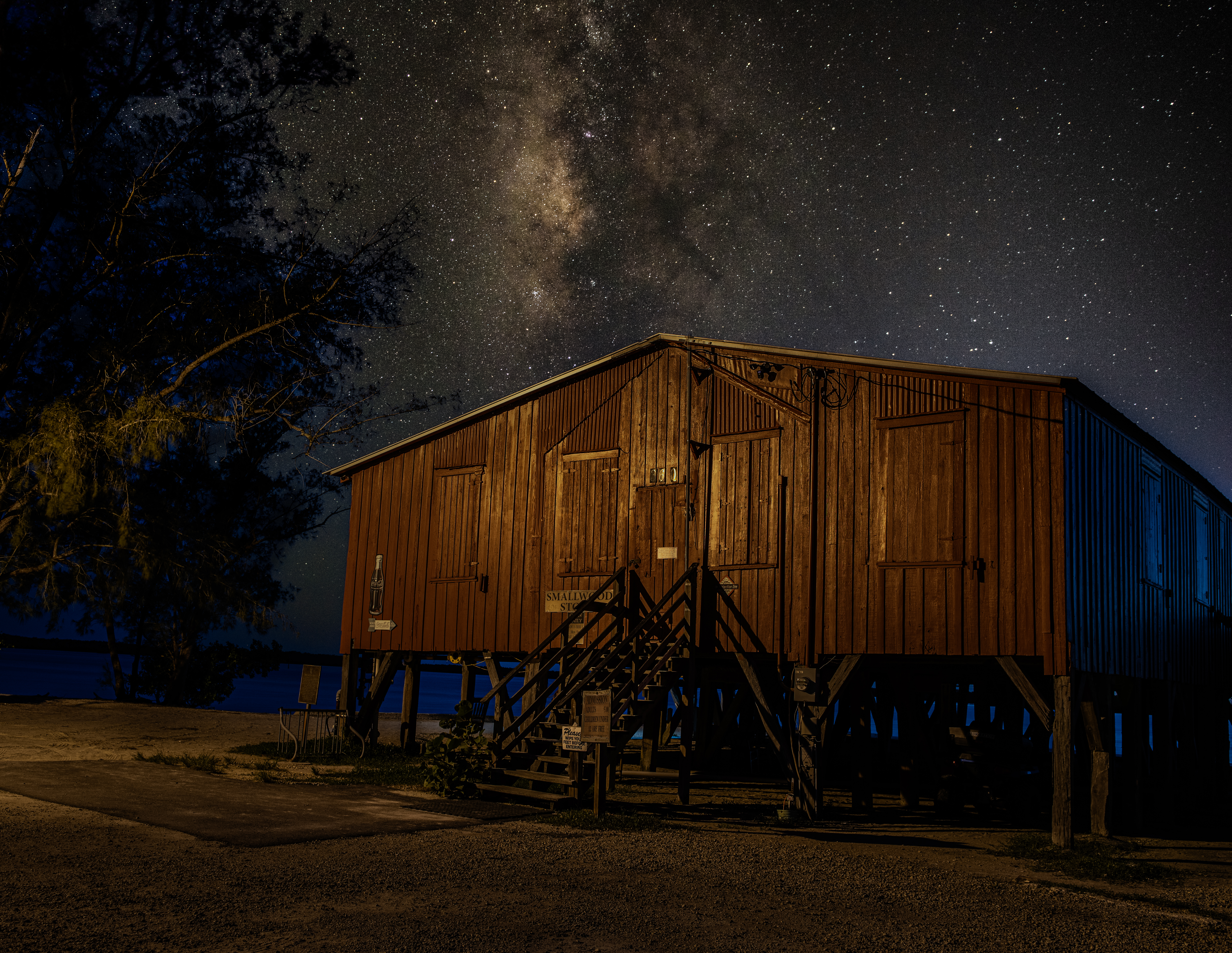
Ted Smallwood Store on Chokoloskee Island

== In the media ==
The Smallwood Store was featured as one of the haunted locations on the paranormal TV series Most Terrifying Places in America in an episode titled "Restless Dead", which aired on the Travel Channel in 2018.

The episode told the story of "Bloody" Ed Watson, an outlaw who allegedly fled Oklahoma after killing a member of Butch and Sundance's Hole-in-the-Wall Gang and wound up in the Everglades. When hired laborers to help with his sugarcane plantation in the area. But when they wanted to move on, Watson would take them to the Smallwood Store so they could catch a boat to Fort Myers or Key West.

However, they never made it. Watson killed them and buried the bodies in the swamp. He did this horrible deed for 15 years, until he was caught in 1910 when someone found the body of a woman named Hannah Smith. The townsfolk rounded up a posse of men and they came after Watson who they knew visited the store for supplies every Tuesday. After the men told Watson they were going to arrest him for their Hannah's death, he came out of the store and aimed his double-barrel shotgun at the men. Since the shotgun shells were wet, the gun misfired. The men then unloaded on Watson; the first shot was right between his eyes, while 30 rounds went into his body. When the town did an autopsy, they pulled a "coffee can" filled with lead out of his body.
