= At Play in the Fields of the Lord (novel) =

1965 novel by Peter Matthiessen

- First edition
- Author: Peter Matthiessen
- Language: English
- Genre: Didactic fiction
- Publisher: Random House
- Publication date: 1965
- Publication place: United States
- Media type: Print (Hardback & Paperback)
- Pages: 373 pp
- Dewey Decimal: 813/.54 20
- LC Class: PS3563.A8584 A8 1991

At Play in the Fields of the Lord is a 1965 novel by Peter Matthiessen. A film adapted from the book was released in 1991. A 2009 audiobook version was read by actor Anthony Heald. It was a finalist for the National Book Award for Fiction.

"In a malarial outpost in the South American rain forest, two misplaced gringos converge and clash. Martin Quarrier has come to convert the fearful and elusive Niaruna Indians to his brand of Christianity. Lewis Moon, a stateless mercenary who is himself part Indian, has come to kill them on behalf of the local comandante. Out of their struggle Peter Matthiessen has created an electrifying moral thriller, a novel of Conradian richness that explores both the varieties of spiritual experience and the politics of cultural genocide."—Synopsis from Goodreads

== Plot ==
Evangelical missionary Martin Quarrier and his wife Hazel arrive in the Amazonian town of Madre de Dios with their son Billy, in order to convert the Niaruna indigenous natives. They meet fellow missionaries Leslie and Andy Huben. In town, they meet a Catholic priest, Father Xantes, who wants to re-establish a mission to the Niaruna, as the previous missionary had been killed by them.

Mercenaries Lewis Moon and his friend Wolfie are enlisted by Comandante Guzman, the leader of the town, to attack the Niaruna. They leave in a plane to drop bombs on their village. But upon seeing the community with his own eyes as well as a native American firing an arrow at the plane, Moon has second thoughts. The plane returns to Madre de Dios.

The following night, Moon takes a large dose of ayahuasca and begins hallucinating. After he comes to, he takes off alone in his plane and parachutes into the Niaruna village. Moon, a half-Native American Cheyenne, aligns himself with the Niarunas. He is accepted as "Kisu-Mu", one of the Niaruna gods, and begins to adapt to Niaruna life and culture.

The four evangelists travel upriver to establish their mission. Eventually the Niaruna come and accept the gifts that the Quarriers offer, not staying long. Billy befriends some of the Niaruna.

Young Billy dies of blackwater fever (a serious complication of malaria), causing Hazel to lose her sanity. An angry dispute with the Niaruna over Billy’s funeral causes the Niaruna to leave, and Martin becomes despondent.

Meanwhile, Moon encounters Andy swimming nude. After he gropes her, Moon catches her influenza. He returns to the Niaruna camp and inadvertently infects everyone. Much of the tribe becomes sick. Moon and goes to the missionary Leslie to beg for drugs.

Leslie refuses, but Martin agrees to provide the drugs, which Moon brings back to the village.

Angry over recent events, the tribe decides to threaten the missionaries to leave. Meanwhile, Father Xantes arrives at the mission with the news that Guzman intends to send soldiers to destroy the Niaruna. Martin travels to the Niaruna village with Xantes’ young Indian helper to warn them of the impending attack. In the village, a fight over leadership occurs involving Moon, and the village is abandoned. Wolfie then arrives in a plane and destroys the abandoned village. Martin survives the aerial attack, but is killed by the Indian helper soon after. Guzman then invades the village with his troops, finding little left. Moon escapes to the east, where he ends up alone.

Back in Madre de Dios, Andy and Father Xantes separately reflect pessimistically on the events with Wolfie.
