= The Snow Leopard =

1978 book by Peter Matthiessen

- First edition
- Author: Peter Matthiessen
- Language: English
- Genre: Travel literature, Natural history
- Publisher: Viking Press
- Publication date: 1978
- Publication place: Nepal
- Media type: Print (hardcover & paperback & e-book)
- Pages: 338 pp (hardcover)
- ISBN: 0-670-65374-8
- OCLC: 3604372
- Dewey Decimal: 915.49/6
- LC Class: QH193.H5 M37 1978

The Snow Leopard is a 1978 book by Peter Matthiessen. It is an account of his two-month search for the snow leopard with naturalist George Schaller in the Dolpo region on the Tibetan Plateau in the Himalaya.

== Content ==
The book recounts the journey of Matthiessen and Schaller in 1973 to Shey Gompa in the inner Dolpo region of Nepal. Schaller's original objective was to compare the mating habits of the Himalayan blue sheep (the bharal) with those of the common sheep of the USA, while for Matthiessen the trip was more of a spiritual exploration. Another aim was to spot the snow leopard, a predator on the bharal and a creature that was seldom seen (it had been glimpsed only twice by Westerners in the previous twenty five years). A third part of the plan was to visit the Crystal Monastery and its Buddhist lama.

The travel aspect of the work is in the tradition of writing by Sir Richard Burton, Sir Henry Morton Stanley, and Sir Ernest Henry Shackleton. The nature writing aspect brings echoes of the work of Alexander von Humboldt or Charles Darwin. It also involves a meditation upon inner peace, however, as well as external exploration, in a way that is reminiscent of Basho, Wordsworth or Thoreau. For example, towards the end of the book Matthiessen sits on some rocks and observes "These hard rocks instruct my bones in what my brain could never grasp in the Heart Sutra, that 'form is emptiness and emptiness is form'—the Void, the emptiness of blue-black space, contained in everything."

Matthiessen frequently digresses to remember his wife Deborah Love who had died of cancer prior to the adventure. The book is, therefore, also a meditation upon death, suffering, loss, memory and healing. The memories of Deborah operate with a number of other recursive stylistic traits that play against the linear, outward progress of the journey logged through maps and dates.

Questions of absence and presence play in tandem with the wider question of gaining peace through an acceptance of how the world is rather than desiring phenomena to arise that do not exist.

== Awards and acclaim ==
The Snow Leopard won the 1979 National Book Award in the category Contemporary Thought and the 1980 National Book Award for Nonfiction (paperback). It has garnered more critical acclaim since then. It has been included in several lists of best travel books including World Hum's ten most celebrated books, Washington Post Book World's Travel Books That Will Take You Far, and National Geographic Traveler's Around the World in 80+ Books.
