= List of composers depicted on film =

This list provides details of cinematic portrayals of composers as characters in film.

A composer may be the main subject of a film, or a less important character. The events portrayed might be reasonably historically accurate or might be fictionalised to some degree. The list includes films released in cinemas as well as films made for television.

This list does not cover purely documentary films. Some films mix elements of drama and documentary, such as Ken Russell's Elgar, and these can be included.

This list does not give details of roles where an actor provides only their voice; nor does it include portrayals of fictional composers.

== List of films by composer ==
Details shown for each film are:

- title
- year of production
- country of production
- language if other than English
- name of actor portraying the composer (they are sometimes shown at different ages in the same film, requiring different actors).

Composer	Film details	Actor	Ref.
Isaac Albéniz	Albéniz (1947); Argentina; Spanish	Pedro López Lagar	
Isaac Albéniz	Holmes & Watson. Madrid Days (2012); Spain; Spanish	Alberto Ruiz-Gallardón	
Johann Georg Albrechtsberger	Whom the Gods Love (1942); Germany, Austria; German	Fritz Imhoff	
Johann Georg Albrechtsberger	Eroica (1949); Austria; German	Alfred Neugebauer	
Johann Christoph Altnickol	Friedemann Bach (1941); Germany; German	Gustav Knuth	
Anna Magdalena Bach	Friedemann Bach (1941); Germany; German	Lina Lossen	
Anna Magdalena Bach	The Chronicle of Anna Magdalena Bach (1968); West Germany; German	Christiane Lang	
Anna Magdalena Bach	Il était une fois Jean-Sébastien Bach (2003); France, French	Elena Lenskaya	
Carl Philipp Emanuel Bach	Friedemann Bach (1941); Germany; German	Wolfgang Liebeneiner	
Carl Philipp Emanuel Bach	Mein Name ist Bach (2003); France, Germany, Switzerland; German	Paul Herwig	
Johann Christoph Bach	Il était une fois Jean-Sébastien Bach (2003); France, French	Cédric Vallet	
Johann Sebastian Bach	Friedemann Bach (1941); Germany; German	Eugen Klöpfer	
Johann Sebastian Bach	The Chronicle of Anna Magdalena Bach (1968); West Germany; German	Gustav Leonhardt	
Johann Sebastian Bach	Mozart (1982) TV series; France, Belgium, Canada, Italy, Switzerland; French	Gerd Böckmann	
Johann Sebastian Bach	Bach's Fight for Freedom (1995); Canada, Czech Republic	Ted Dykstra	
Johann Sebastian Bach	Uzhin V Chetyre Ruki (2000); Russia	Evgeniy Steblov	
Johann Sebastian Bach	Il était une fois Jean-Sébastien Bach (2003); France, French	Gwenaël Foucher, Christian Vadim	
Johann Sebastian Bach	Mein Name ist Bach (2003); France, Germany, Switzerland; German	Vadim Glowna	
Johann Sebastian Bach	Bach – A Christmas Miracle (2024); Germany, Austria	Devid Striesow	
Wilhelm Friedemann Bach	Friedemann Bach (1941); Germany; German	Gustaf Gründgens	
Wilhelm Friedemann Bach	The Chronicle of Anna Magdalena Bach (1968); West Germany; German	Andreas Pangritz	
Wilhelm Friedemann Bach	Mein Name ist Bach (2003); France, Germany, Switzerland; German	Anatole Taubman	
Mily Balakirev	Mussorgsky (1950); USSR; Russian	Vladimir Balashov	
Béla Bartók	Bartok (1964); UK	Boris Ranevsky	
Ludwig van Beethoven see also: Beethoven in film see also: Category:Depictions of Ludwig van Beethoven on film	Franz Schuberts letzte Liebe (1926); Austria; German	Theodor Weiser	
Ludwig van Beethoven see also: Beethoven in film see also: Category:Depictions of Ludwig van Beethoven on film	Beethoven's Great Love (1937); France; French	Harry Baur	
Ludwig van Beethoven see also: Beethoven in film see also: Category:Depictions of Ludwig van Beethoven on film	Serenade (1940); France; French	Auguste Bovério	
Ludwig van Beethoven see also: Beethoven in film see also: Category:Depictions of Ludwig van Beethoven on film	The Great Awakening (1941); USA	Albert Bassermann	
Ludwig van Beethoven see also: Beethoven in film see also: Category:Depictions of Ludwig van Beethoven on film	Whom the Gods Love (1942); Germany, Austria; German	René Deltgen	
Ludwig van Beethoven see also: Beethoven in film see also: Category:Depictions of Ludwig van Beethoven on film	Heavenly Music (1943); USA	Steven Geray	
Ludwig van Beethoven see also: Beethoven in film see also: Category:Depictions of Ludwig van Beethoven on film	Eroica (1949); Austria; German	Ewald Balser	
Ludwig van Beethoven see also: Beethoven in film see also: Category:Depictions of Ludwig van Beethoven on film	Napoléon (1955); France; French	Erich von Stroheim	
Ludwig van Beethoven see also: Beethoven in film see also: Category:Depictions of Ludwig van Beethoven on film	The House of Three Girls (1958); West Germany, Austria; German	Ewald Balser	
Ludwig van Beethoven see also: Beethoven in film see also: Category:Depictions of Ludwig van Beethoven on film	The Magnificent Rebel (1962); USA, Austria; English, German (made as 2 episodes of the TV series Disneyland but then unified as a feature film and given a cinematic release)	Karlheinz Böhm	
Ludwig van Beethoven see also: Beethoven in film see also: Category:Depictions of Ludwig van Beethoven on film	Le Neveu de Beethoven (1985); France, West Germany	Wolfgang Reichmann	
Ludwig van Beethoven see also: Beethoven in film see also: Category:Depictions of Ludwig van Beethoven on film	Bill & Ted's Excellent Adventure (1989); USA; English	Clifford David	
Ludwig van Beethoven see also: Beethoven in film see also: Category:Depictions of Ludwig van Beethoven on film	Beethoven Lives Upstairs (1992); Canada	Neil Munro	
Ludwig van Beethoven see also: Beethoven in film see also: Category:Depictions of Ludwig van Beethoven on film	Immortal Beloved (1994); UK, USA; English, Hungarian	Gary Oldman	
Ludwig van Beethoven see also: Beethoven in film see also: Category:Depictions of Ludwig van Beethoven on film	Eroica (2003); UK	Ian Hart	
Ludwig van Beethoven see also: Beethoven in film see also: Category:Depictions of Ludwig van Beethoven on film	Beethoven (2005: TV mini-series)	Paul Rhys	
Ludwig van Beethoven see also: Beethoven in film see also: Category:Depictions of Ludwig van Beethoven on film	Copying Beethoven (2006); USA	Ed Harris	
Ludwig van Beethoven see also: Beethoven in film see also: Category:Depictions of Ludwig van Beethoven on film	Louis van Beethoven (2020) (2020); Germany	Tobias Moretti	
Vincenzo Bellini	Casta Diva (1935); Italy; Italian	Sandro Palmieri	
Vincenzo Bellini	Casta Diva (1954); Italy; Italian	Maurice Ronet	
Vincenzo Bellini	Casa Ricordi (1954); Italy; Italian	Maurice Ronet	
Hector Berlioz	Paganini (1923); Germany; silent	Jean Nadolovitch	
Hector Berlioz	La Symphonie fantastique (1942); France; French	Jean-Louis Barrault	
Hector Berlioz	Lisztomania (1975); UK	Murray Melvin	
Hector Berlioz	Liszt Ferenc (1982); Hungary; Hungarian	József Székhelyi	
Hector Berlioz	La vie de Berlioz (1983); France; French	Daniel Mesguich	
Leonard Bernstein	Maestro (2023); USA; English	Bradley Cooper	
Georges Bizet	Bizet's Dream (1994); Czech Republic, Canada	Maurice Godin	
Arrigo Boito	Puccini (1953); Italy; Italian	Carlo Duse	
Arrigo Boito	The Life of Verdi (1982); Italy, France, UK, West Germany, Sweden; Italian	Lino Capolicchio	
Alexander Borodin	Song of My Heart (1948); USA	Robert Barron	
Alexander Borodin	Mussorgsky (1950); USSR; Russian	Yuri Leonidov	
Johannes Brahms	Rosen aus dem Süden (1934); Germany; German	Hugo Werner-Kahle	
Johannes Brahms	Guten Abend, gute Nacht (1936); Germany; German	Albert Florath	
Johannes Brahms	Dreaming (1944); Germany; German	Ullrich Haupt	
Johannes Brahms	Song of Love (1947); USA (re-released in 1950 in a shorter version titled The Schumann Story)	Robert Walker	
Johannes Brahms	The Strauss Family (1972); UK	Laurence Carter	
Johannes Brahms	Der Fall des Robert Schumann (1990); West Germany; German	Martin Ehrbächer	
Johannes Brahms	Inner Voices (2003); Canada	Ken Roy	
Johannes Brahms	Robert Schumann - Clara Wieck - Johannes Brahms (2006); Germany; German	Sebastian Mirow	
Johannes Brahms	Geliebte Clara (2008); Germany, France, Hungary; German	Malik Zidi	
Anton Bruckner	The Strange Affliction of Anton Bruckner (1990); UK	Peter Mackriel	
Anton Bruckner	Bruckners Entscheidung (1995); Germany; German	Joachim Bauer	
Hans von Bülow	Magic Fire (1955); USA	Eric Schumann	
Hans von Bülow	Ludwig (1972); Italy, France; Italian, French	Mark Burns	
Hans von Bülow	Lisztomania (1975); UK	Andrew Reilly	
Hans von Bülow	Liszt Ferenc (1982); Hungary; Hungarian	István Iglódi	
Hans von Bülow	Wagner (1983); UK	Miguel Herz-Kestranek	
Hans von Bülow	Wahnfried (1986); Germany, France; German, French	Peter Matic	
Ferruccio Busoni	Sibelius (2003); Finland; Finnish	Hannu Kivioja	
Dieterich Buxtehude	Il était une fois Jean-Sébastien Bach (2003); France, French	Alain Floret	
Chevalier de Saint-Georges	Chevalier (2022); USA; English	Kelvin Harrison Jr.	
Frédéric Chopin	Chopin e George Sand (1910); Italy; silent	Alberto Degli Abbati	
Frédéric Chopin	Nocturne of Love (1919); Germany; silent	Conrad Veidt	
Frédéric Chopin	Fadette (1926); Germany; German	Alfred Abel	
Frédéric Chopin	La chanson de l'adieu (1934); Germany; French	Jean Servais	
Frédéric Chopin	Farewell Waltz (1934); Germany; German	Wolfgang Liebeneiner	
Frédéric Chopin	The Life of Chopin (1938); UK	Frank Henderson	
Frédéric Chopin	Pontcarral, colonel d'empire (1942); France; French	Jean Chaduc	
Frédéric Chopin	Szerelmes szívek (1944); Hungary; Hungarian	Gyula Benkö	
Frédéric Chopin	A Song to Remember (1945); USA	Cornel Wilde	
Frédéric Chopin	Housle a sen (1947); Czechoslovakia; Czech	Václav Voska	
Frédéric Chopin	Bohemian Rapture (1948); Czechoslovakia; Czech	Václav Voska	
Frédéric Chopin	La rebelión de los fantasmas (1949); Mexico; Spanish	Francisco Valera	
Frédéric Chopin	Nocturne in Scotland (1951); UK	Hugh Burden	
Frédéric Chopin	Youth of Chopin (1952); Poland; Polish	Czesław Wołłejko	
Frédéric Chopin	George Sand (1958); Brazil; Portuguese	Egídio Eccio	
Frédéric Chopin	George Sandin salongissa (1960); Finland; Finnish	Fred Richard	
Frédéric Chopin	Song Without End (1960); USA	Alexander Davion	
Frédéric Chopin	Prelúdio, A Vida de Chopin (1962); Brazil; Portuguese	Cláudio Marzo	
Frédéric Chopin	Chopin and George Sand - The Creative Years (1966); UK	Jeremy Brett	
Frédéric Chopin	Jutrzenka (aka A Winter in Mallorca) (1969); Spain; Spanish	Christopher Sandford	
Frédéric Chopin	George Who? (1973); France; French	Pierre Kalinovski	
Frédéric Chopin	Notorious Woman (1974); UK	George Chakiris	
Frédéric Chopin	Lisztomania (1975); UK	Kenneth Colley	
Frédéric Chopin	Le porte-clefs (1981); France; French	Jean-Claude Leguay	
Frédéric Chopin	Liszt Ferenc (1982); Hungary; Hungarian	László Gálffi	
Frédéric Chopin	Ein Winter auf Mallorca (1982); West Germany; German	Krystian Martinek	
Frédéric Chopin	Impromptu (1991); UK, France	Hugh Grant	
Frédéric Chopin	La note bleue (1991); France, Germany; French	Janusz Olejniczak	
Frédéric Chopin	Chopin - Bilder einer Trennung (1993); France, Germany	Stephan Wolf-Schönburg	
Frédéric Chopin	The Strange Case of Delphina Potocka: or, The Mystery of Chopin (1999)	Paul Rhys	
Frédéric Chopin	Pół serio (2000); Poland; Polish	Rafal Królikowski	
Frédéric Chopin	Toute la ville en parle (2000); France; French	Maurice Mons	
Frédéric Chopin	Chopin: Frédéric et George (2001); Canada; French	Darren Bonin	
Frédéric Chopin	Chopin: Desire for Love (2002); Poland; Polish	Piotr Adamczyk	
Frédéric Chopin	George et Fanchette (2010); France; French	Fabrice Pruvost	
Frédéric Chopin	Chopin, a Sonata in Paris (2025); Poland; Polish	Eryk Kulm	
George M. Cohan	Yankee Doodle Dandy (1942); USA	James Cagney	
George M. Cohan	The Seven Little Foys (1955); USA	James Cagney	
Aaron Copland	Salón México (1996); Mexico	Steven Brown	
Aaron Copland	Maestro	Brian Klugman	
César Cui	Song of My Heart (1948); USA	William Ruhl	
César Cui	Mussorgsky (1950); USSR; Russian	Bruno Freindlich	
Alexander Dargomyzhsky	Mussorgsky (1950); USSR; Russian	Fyodor Nikitin	
Alexander Dargomyzhsky	Kompozitor Glinka (1953); USSR; Russian	Yuri Lyubimov	
Claude Debussy	The Debussy Film (1958); UK	Oliver Reed	
Claude Debussy	Camille Claudel (1988); France; French	Maxime Leroux	
Claude Debussy	La musique de l’amour: Chouchou (1995); France; French	François Marthouret	
Élie-Miriam Delaborde	Bizet's Dream (1994); Czech Republic, Canada	R. H. Thomson	
Frederick Delius	Song of Summer (1968); UK	Max Adrian	
Anton Diabelli	It's Only Love (1947); Austria; German	Julius Brandt	
Anton Diabelli	Franz Schubert (1953); Austria; German	Franz Pfaudler	
Anton Diabelli	The House of Three Girls (1958); West Germany, Austria; German	Richard Romanowsky	
Gaetano Donizetti	Il cavaliere del sogno (1947); Italy; Italian	Amedeo Nazzari	
Gaetano Donizetti	Casa Ricordi (1954); Italy; Italian	Marcello Mastroianni	
Gaetano Donizetti	The Life of Verdi (1982); Italy, France, UK, West Germany, Sweden; Italian	Ugo Bologna	
Sophie Eckhardt-Gramatté	Appassionata: The Extraordinary Life & Music of Sonia Eckhardt-Gramatté (2006); Canada	Colombe Demers	
Edward Elgar	Elgar (1962); UK	George McGrath	
Józef Elsner	La chanson de l'adieu (1934); Germany; French	Marcel Vallée	
Józef Elsner	Farewell Waltz (1934); Germany; German	Richard Romanowsky	
Józef Elsner	A Song to Remember (1945); USA	Paul Muni	
Józef Elsner	Youth of Chopin (1952); Poland; Polish	Jan Kurnakowicz	
Józef Elsner	Prelúdio, A Vida de Chopin (1962); Brazil; Portuguese	Percy Aires	
Ferenc Erkel	Liszt Ferenc (1982); Hungary; Hungarian	László Vajda	
Eric Fenby	Song of Summer (1968); UK	Christopher Gable	
Stephen Foster	Harmony Lane (1935); USA, English	Douglass Montgomery	
Stephen Foster	Swanee River (1939); USA, English	Don Ameche	
Stephen Foster	I Dream of Jeanie (1952); USA, English	Bill Shirley	
Frederick II of Prussia	Mein Name ist Bach (2003); France, Germany, Switzerland; German	Jürgen Vogel	
Niels Gade	Song of Norway (1970); USA	Ronald Adam	
George Gershwin	Rhapsody in Blue (1945); USA	Robert Alda	
George Gershwin	So This Is Love (1953); USA	William Boyett	
George Gershwin	The Adventures of Young Indiana Jones: Hollywood Follies (); (1994); USA	Tom Beckett	
Alexander Glazunov	Rimsky-Korsakov (1952); USSR; Russian	Viktor Khokhryakov	
Alexander Glazunov	Testimony (1987); Denmark, Netherlands, Sweden, West Germany, UK	Peter Woodthorpe	
Mikhail Glinka	The Great Glinka (1946); USSR; Russian	Boris Chirkov	
Mikhail Glinka	Kompozitor Glinka (1953); USSR; Russian	Boris Smirnov	
Mikhail Glinka	Szerelmi álmok – Liszt (1970); Hungary, USSR; various	Petr Shelokhonov	
Percy Grainger	Song of Summer (1968); UK	David Collings	
Percy Grainger	Passion (1999); Australia	Richard Roxburgh	
Edvard Grieg	Song of Norway (1970); USA	Toralv Maurstad	
Johan Halvorsen	Sibelius (2003); Finland; Finnish	Johan Fagerudd	
George Frideric Handel	The Great Mr. Handel (1942); UK	Wilfrid Lawson	
George Frideric Handel	God Rot Tunbridge Wells! (1986); UK	Trevor Howard, Christopher Bramwell, Dave Griffiths	
George Frideric Handel	Farinelli (1994); Italy, Belgium, France; French, Italian	Jeroen Krabbé	
George Frideric Handel	Handel's Last Chance (1996); Canada, Slovakia	Leon Pownall	
George Frideric Handel	Uzhin V Chetyre Ruki (2000); Russia	Mikhail Kozakov	
Joseph Haydn	Eternal Melodies (1940), Italy, Italian	Cesare Polacco	
Joseph Haydn	The Magnificent Rebel (1962); USA, Austria; English, German (made as 2 episodes of the TV series Disneyland but then unified as a feature film and given a cinematic release)	Ernst Nadherny	
Joseph Haydn	Mozart (1982) TV series; France, Belgium, Canada, Italy, Switzerland; French	Peter Pasetti	
Joseph Haydn	Forget Mozart (1985); West Germany, Czechoslovakia; German	Ladislav Chudík	
Joseph Haydn	Eroica (2003); UK	Frank Finlay	
Joseph Haydn	The Genius of Mozart (2004); UK	Ron Donachie	
Michael Haydn	Mozart (1982) TV series; France, Belgium, Canada, Italy, Switzerland; French	Jean-Pierre Sentier	
Bernard Herrmann	RKO 281 (1999); USA	Kerry Shale	
Hildegard of Bingen	Vision – From the Life of Hildegard von Bingen (2009); Germany, France; German, English	Barbara Sukowa	
Anselm Hüttenbrenner	Blossom Time (1934); UK	Ivan Samson	
Anselm Hüttenbrenner	Unfinished Symphony (1937); UK, Austria	Esme Percy	
Leoš Janáček	In Search of Janáček (2004); Czech Republic; Czech	Hanuš Bor	
Armas Järnefelt	Sibelius (2003); Finland; Finnish	Tapani Kalliomäki	
Scott Joplin	Scott Joplin (1977); USA	Billy Dee Williams	
Robert Kajanus	Sibelius (2003); Finland; Finnish	Vesa Vierikko	
Friedrich Kalkbrenner	La chanson de l'adieu (1934); Germany; French	Marcel André	
Friedrich Kalkbrenner	Farewell Waltz (1934); Germany; German	Gustav Waldau	
Friedrich Kalkbrenner	A Song to Remember (1945); USA	Howard Freeman	
Aram Khachaturian	Testimony (1987); Denmark, Netherlands, Sweden, West Germany, UK	William Squire	
Aram Khachaturian	Khachaturian (2003); United States	Peter Rosen	
Ernst Krenek	Mahler (1974); UK	Kenneth Colley	
Joseph Lanner	The Strauss Family (1972); UK	Derek Jacobi	
Vatroslav Lisinski	Lisinski (1944); Yugoslavia, Germany; Croatian	Branko Špoljar	
Franz Liszt	Paganini (1923); Germany; silent	Gustav Fröhlich	
Franz Liszt	La chanson de l'adieu (1934); Germany; French	Daniel Lecourtois	
Franz Liszt	Farewell Waltz (1934); Germany; German	Hans Schlenck	
Franz Liszt	If It Were Not for Music (1935); Germany; German, Italian	Luis Rainer	
Franz Liszt	Suez (1938); USA	Brandon Hurst	
Franz Liszt	Pontcarral, colonel d'empire (1942); France; French	Marc Dantzer	
Franz Liszt	The Phantom of the Opera (1943); USA	Fritz Leiber	
Franz Liszt	Dreaming (1944); Germany; German	Emil Lohkamp	
Franz Liszt	A Song to Remember (1945); USA	Stephen Bekassy	
Franz Liszt	Song of Love (1947); USA (re-released in 1950 in a shorter version titled The Schumann Story, but the Liszt character was cut out)	Henry Daniell	
Franz Liszt	Kompozitor Glinka (1953); USSR; Russian	Sviatoslav Richter	
Franz Liszt	Magic Fire (1955); USA	Carlos Thompson	
Franz Liszt	Lola Montès (1955); France, West Germany	Will Quadflieg	
Franz Liszt	George Sandin salongissa (1960); Finland; Finnish	Jaakko Helkavaara	
Franz Liszt	Song Without End (1960); USA	Dirk Bogarde	
Franz Liszt	Song of Norway (1970); USA	Henry Gilbert	
Franz Liszt	Szerelmi álmok – Liszt (1970); Hungary, USSR; various	Imre Sinkovits	
Franz Liszt	George Who? (1973); France; French	Maxence Mailfort	
Franz Liszt	Notorious Woman (1974); UK	Jeremy Irons	
Franz Liszt	Lisztomania (1975); UK	Roger Daltrey	
Franz Liszt	Liszt Ferenc (1982); Hungary; Hungarian	Iván Darvas, Géza Hegedüs D.	
Franz Liszt	La vie de Berlioz (1983); France; French	Péter Trokán	
Franz Liszt	Wagner (1983); UK	Ekkehard Schall	
Franz Liszt	Wahnfried (1986); Germany, France; German, French	Anton Diffring	
Franz Liszt	Impromptu (1991); UK, France	Julian Sands	
Franz Liszt	Liszt's Rhapsody (1996): Canada	Geordie Johnson	
Franz Liszt	Chopin: Desire for Love (2002); Poland; Polish	Michal Konarski	
Jean-Baptiste Lully	Le Roi danse (2000); France; French	Boris Terral	
Anatoly Lyadov	Rimsky-Korsakov (1952); USSR; Russian	Anatoliy Kuznetsov	
Gustav Mahler	Mahler (1974); UK	Robert Powell	
Gustav Mahler	Nedovrsena simfonija (1998); Yugoslavia; Serbian	Slobodan Ljubicic	
Gustav Mahler	Bride of the Wind (2001); UK, Germany, Austria	Jonathan Pryce	
Gustav Mahler	Mahler on the Couch (2010); Germany, Austria; German	Johannes Silberschneider	
Marin Marais	Tous les Matins du Monde (1991); France; French	Gérard Depardieu	
Fanny Mendelssohn	Requiem for Fanny (2001); Canada	Estelle Clareton	
Felix Mendelssohn	Lisztomania (1975); UK	Otto Diamant	
Felix Mendelssohn	Besuch bei ihr (1982); East Germany; German	Klaus-Peter Thiele	
Felix Mendelssohn	Spring Symphony (1983); West Germany; German	André Heller	
Felix Mendelssohn	Requiem for Fanny (2001); Canada	Paul-Antoine Taillefer	
André Messager	La musique de l'amour: Chouchou (1995); France; French	Valeri Doronin	
Giacomo Meyerbeer	Magic Fire (1955); USA	Charles Régnier	
Giacomo Meyerbeer	Wagner (1983); UK	Vernon Dobtcheff	
Ignaz Moscheles	Nocturne in Scotland (1951); UK	Marcel Poncin	
Stanisław Moniuszko	Warsaw Premiere (1951); Poland; Polish	Jan Koecher	
Leopold Mozart	Mozarts Leben, Lieben und Leiden (1921), Austria; German	Paul Gerhardt	
Leopold Mozart	Whom the Gods Love (1936); UK	Hubert Harben	
Leopold Mozart	Eternal Melodies (1940), Italy, Italian	Luigi Pavese	
Leopold Mozart	Whom the Gods Love (1942); Germany, Austria; German	Walter Janssen	
Leopold Mozart	Mozart: A Childhood Chronicle (1974); West Germany; German	Maria Schley	
Leopold Mozart	Mozart (1982) TV series; France, Belgium, Canada, Italy, Switzerland; French	Michel Bouquet	
Leopold Mozart	Amadeus (1984); USA	Roy Dotrice	
Leopold Mozart	Noi tre (1984), Italy, Italian	Lino Capolicchio	
Leopold Mozart	The Genius of Mozart (2004); UK	Kenneth Cranham	
Leopold Mozart	Mozart - Ich hätte München Ehre gemacht (2006); Germany	Gerard Alexander Held	
Leopold Mozart	In Search of Mozart (2006) UK	Sean Barrett	
Leopold Mozart	Mozart's Sister (2010); France; French	Marc Barbé	
Wolfgang Amadeus Mozart	Mozarts Leben, Lieben und Leiden (1921), Austria; German	Josef Zetenius, Senta Stillmark	
Wolfgang Amadeus Mozart	Whom the Gods Love (1936); UK	Stephen Haggard, Pat Fitzpatrick	
Wolfgang Amadeus Mozart	Eternal Melodies (1940), Italy, Italian	Cesare Barbetti, Gino Cervi	
Wolfgang Amadeus Mozart	Whom the Gods Love (1942); Germany, Austria; German	Hans Holt	
Wolfgang Amadeus Mozart	Mozart (1955); Austria; German	Oskar Werner	
Wolfgang Amadeus Mozart	A Requiem for Mozart (1967); USSR; Russian	Innokenty Smoktunovsky	
Wolfgang Amadeus Mozart	Mozart: A Childhood Chronicle (1974); West Germany; German	Pavlos Bekiaris, Diego Crovetti, Santiago Ziesmer	
Wolfgang Amadeus Mozart	Mozart (1982) TV series; France, Belgium, Canada, Italy, Switzerland; French	Karol Zuber, Jean-François Dichamp, Christoph Bantzer	
Wolfgang Amadeus Mozart	Amadeus (1984); USA	Tom Hulce	
Wolfgang Amadeus Mozart	Noi tre (1984), Italy, Italian	Cristopher Davidson	
Wolfgang Amadeus Mozart	Forget Mozart (1985); West Germany, Czechoslovakia; German	Max Tidof	
Wolfgang Amadeus Mozart	The Genius of Mozart (2004); UK	Jack Tarlton	
Wolfgang Amadeus Mozart	Mozart - Ich hätte München Ehre gemacht (2006); Germany	Xaver Hutter	
Wolfgang Amadeus Mozart	In Search of Mozart (2006) UK	Sam West / Frank Adams-Brown	
Wolfgang Amadeus Mozart	I, Don Giovanni (2009); Italy, Spain; German, Italian	Lino Guanciale	
Wolfgang Amadeus Mozart	Mozart's Sister (2010); France; French	David Moreau	
Modest Mussorgsky	Song of My Heart (1948); USA	Lewis Howard	
Modest Mussorgsky	Mussorgsky (1950); USSR; Russian	Aleksandr Borisov	
Josef Mysliveček	Il Boemo (2022); Czech Republic; Czech	Vojtěch Dyk	
Rikard Nordraak	Song of Norway (1970); USA	Frank Porretta	
Jacques Offenbach	The Empress and I (1933); Germany; German	Julius Falkenstein	
Jacques Offenbach	Moi et l'impératrice (1933); Germany, France; French	Julius Falkenstein	
Jacques Offenbach	The Only Girl (1933); Germany, UK	Julius Falkenstein	
Jacques Offenbach	Idol of Paris (1948); UK	Miles Malleson	
Jacques Offenbach	The Paris Waltz (1950); France; French	Pierre Fresnay	
Jacques Offenbach	The Eternal Waltz (1954); West Germany; German	Arnulf Schröder	
Jacques Offenbach	The Great Waltz (1972); USA	Dominique Weber	
Jacques Offenbach	Les folies Offenbach (TV miniseries, 1977–78); France; French	Michel Serrault	
Jacques Offenbach	Johann Strauss: The King Without a Crown (1987), Austria	Philippe Nicaud	
Ignacy Jan Paderewski	Moonlight Sonata (1937); UK	Himself	
Niccolò Paganini	The House of Three Girls (1918); Germany; silent	Raoul Lange	
Niccolò Paganini	Paganini (1923); Germany; silent	Conrad Veidt	
Niccolò Paganini	Franz Schuberts letzte Liebe (1926); Austria; German	Otto Schmöle	
Niccolò Paganini	Fadette (1926); Germany; German	Hanns Waschatko	
Niccolò Paganini	La Symphonie fantastique (1942); France; French	Maurice Schutz	
Niccolò Paganini	Heavenly Music (1943); USA	Fritz Feld	
Niccolò Paganini	A Song to Remember (1945); USA	Roxy Roth	
Niccolò Paganini	The Magic Bow (1946); UK	Stewart Granger	
Niccolò Paganini	Housle a sen (1947); Czechoslovakia; Czech	Karel Dostal	
Niccolò Paganini	Bohemian Rapture (1948); Czechoslovakia; Czech	Karel Dostal	
Niccolò Paganini	Youth of Chopin (1952); Poland; Polish	Franciszek Jamry	
Niccolò Paganini	Spring Symphony (1983); West Germany; German	Gidon Kremer	
Niccolò Paganini	Paganini (1989; aka Kinski Paganini); Italy; Italian	Klaus Kinski	
Maria Theresia von Paradis	Mesmer (1994); Austria, Canada, UK, Germany (as Maria Theresa Paradies)	Amanda Ooms	
Giovanni Battista Pergolesi	Pergolesi (1932); Italy; Italian	Elio Steiner	
Ignaz Pleyel	Farewell Waltz (1934); Germany; German	Paul Henckels	
Nicola Porpora	Farinelli (1994); Italy, Belgium, France; French, Italian	Omero Antonutti	
Giacomo Puccini	Puccini (1953); Italy; Italian	Gabriele Ferzetti	
Giacomo Puccini	Casa Ricordi (1954); Italy; Italian	Gabriele Ferzetti	
Giacomo Puccini	Puccini (1984); UK	Robert Stephens	
Giacomo Puccini	Puccini e la fanciulla (2008); Italy; Italian	Riccardo Moretti	
Giacomo Puccini	Victoria & Abdul (2017); USA; English	Simon Callow	
Henry Purcell	England, My England (1995); UK	Michael Ball	
Sergei Rachmaninoff	Rhapsody in Blue (1945); USA	Will Wright	
Sergei Rachmaninoff	Ya – aktrisa (1980); USSR; Russian	Vladimir Korenev	
Sergei Rachmaninoff	Ellis Island (1984); USA	Vernon Dobtcheff	
Sergei Rachmaninoff	The Child Prodigy (2010); Canada; French	Itzhak Finzi	
Maurice Ravel	Rhapsody in Blue (1945); USA	Oscar Loraine	
Maurice Ravel	Nedovrsena simfonija (1998); Yugoslavia; Serbian	Fedja Stojanovic	
Maurice Ravel	Ravel's Brain (2001); Canada; French, English	Thierry Costa	
Maurice Ravel	Boléro (2024); France; French	Raphaël Personnaz	
Carl Reinecke	Song of Love (1947); USA (re-released in 1950 in a shorter version titled The Schumann Story, but the Reinecke character was cut out)	Konstantin Shayne	
Ferdinand Ries	Eroica (2003); UK	Leo Bill	
Ferdinand Ries	Beethoven (2005: TV mini-series)	Bertie Carvel	
Nikolai Rimsky-Korsakov	Song of Scheherazade (1947); USA	Jean-Pierre Aumont	
Nikolai Rimsky-Korsakov	Song of My Heart (1948); USA	David Leonard	
Nikolai Rimsky-Korsakov	Mussorgsky (1950); USSR; Russian	Andrei Popov	
Nikolai Rimsky-Korsakov	Rimsky-Korsakov (1952); USSR; Russian	Grigori Belov	
Juventino Rosas	Over the Waves (1950); Mexico, Spanish	Pedro Infante	
Gioachino Rossini	Fadette (1926); Germany; German	Rudolf Klein-Rogge	
Gioachino Rossini	Rossini (1942); Italy; Italian	Nino Besozzi	
Gioachino Rossini	Casa Ricordi (1954); Italy; Italian	Roland Alexandre	
Gioachino Rossini	Lisztomania (1975); UK	Ken Parry	
Gioachino Rossini	Rossini! Rossini! (1991); Italy; Italian	Sergio Castellitto, Philippe Noiret	
Gioachino Rossini	Rossini's Ghost (1996); Canada	Joseph Di Mambro	
Nikolai Rubinstein	Song of My Heart (1948); USA	Lester Sharpe	
Nikolai Rubinstein	Tchaikovsky (1969); USSR; Russian	Vladislav Strzhelchik	
Nikolai Rubinstein	The Music Lovers (1970); UK	Max Adrian	
Monsieur de Sainte-Colombe	Tous les Matins du Monde (1991); France; French	Jean-Pierre Marielle	
Antonio Salieri	Unfinished Symphony (1934); UK, Austria	Cecil Humphreys	
Antonio Salieri	Eternal Melodies (1940), Italy, Italian	Augusto Marcacci	
Antonio Salieri	Mozart (1955); Austria; German	Albin Skoda	
Antonio Salieri	A Requiem for Mozart (1967); USSR; Russian	Pyotr Glebov	
Antonio Salieri	Mozart (1982) TV series; France, Belgium, Canada, Italy, Switzerland; French	Carlo Rivolta	
Antonio Salieri	Amadeus (1984); USA	F. Murray Abraham	
Antonio Salieri	Forget Mozart (1985); West Germany, Czechoslovakia; German	Winfried Glatzeder	
Antonio Salieri	I, Don Giovanni (2009); Italy, Spain; German, Italian	Ennio Fantastichini	
Erik Satie	La musique de l'amour: Chouchou (1995); France; French	Sergei Zamorev	
Arnold Schoenberg	Bride of the Wind (2001); UK, Germany, Austria	Robert Herzl (theatre director)	
Franz Schubert	The House of Three Girls (1918); Germany; silent	Julius Spielmann	
Franz Schubert	A Waltz by Strauss (1925); Austria; silent	Philipp von Zeska	
Franz Schubert	Franz Schuberts letzte Liebe (1926); Austria; German	Philipp von Zeska	
Franz Schubert	Seven Faces (1929); USA	Paul Muni	
Franz Schubert	Schubert's Dream of Spring (1931); Germany; German	Carl Jöken	
Franz Schubert	Gently My Songs Entreat (1933); Austria; German	Hans Jaray	
Franz Schubert	Blossom Time (1934); UK	Richard Tauber	
Franz Schubert	Unfinished Symphony (1934); UK, Austria	Hans Jaray	
Franz Schubert	Love Time (1934); USA	Nils Asther	
Franz Schubert	Three Girls for Schubert (1936); Germany; German	Paul Hörbiger	
Franz Schubert	Horch, horch, die Lerch im Ätherblau (1936); Germany; German	Eduard Bornträger	
Franz Schubert	Beethoven's Great Love (1937); France; French	Dalméras	
Franz Schubert	Serenade (1940); France; French	Bernard Lancret	
Franz Schubert	The Great Awakening (1941); USA	Alan Curtis	
Franz Schubert	It's Only Love (1947); Austria; German	Franz Böheim	
Franz Schubert	La Belle Meunière (1948); France; French	Tino Rossi	
Franz Schubert	Franz Schubert (1953); Austria; German	Heinrich Schweiger	
Franz Schubert	Symphony of Love (1956); France, Italy; Italian	Claude Laydu	
Franz Schubert	The House of Three Girls (1958); West Germany, Austria; German	Karlheinz Böhm	
Franz Schubert	Jomfruburet (1959); Denmark; Danish	Hans Kurt	
Franz Schubert	Du holde Kunst - Szenen um Lieder von Franz Schubert (1961); West Germany; German	Kurt Heintel	
Franz Schubert	Angeli senza paradiso (1970); Italy; Italian	Albano	
Franz Schubert	Leise flehen meine Lieder (1978); East Germany; German	Christian Steyer, Jan Bitterlich	
Franz Schubert	Mit meinen heißen Tränen (1986); Austria; German	Udo Samel	
Franz Schubert	The Temptation of Franz Schubert (1997); UK (aka The Double Life of Franz Schubert)	Simon Russell Beale	
Franz Schubert	Schumann, Schubert und der Schnee (2006); Germany; German	Ludwig Blochberger	
Clara Schumann	Dreaming (1944); Germany; German	Hilde Krahl	
Clara Schumann	Song of Love (1947); USA (re-released in 1950 in a shorter version titled The Schumann Story)	Katharine Hepburn	
Clara Schumann	Spring Symphony (1983); West Germany; German	Nastassja Kinski	
Clara Schumann	Der Fall des Robert Schumann (1990); West Germany; German	Ricarda Weber, Lili Weber-Andreae	
Clara Schumann	Inner Voices (2003); Canada	Catherine Viau	
Clara Schumann	Robert Schumann - Clara Wieck - Johannes Brahms (2006); Germany; German	Elsa Hanewinkel	
Clara Schumann	Schumann, Schubert und der Schnee (2006); Germany; German	Elisabeth Trissenaar	
Clara Schumann	Geliebte Clara (2008); Germany, France, Hungary; German	Martina Gedeck	
Robert Schumann	Dreaming (1944); Germany; German	Mathias Wieman	
Robert Schumann	Song of Love (1947); USA (re-released in 1950 in a shorter version titled The Schumann Story)	Paul Henreid	
Robert Schumann	Spring Symphony (1983); West Germany; German	Herbert Grönemeyer	
Robert Schumann	Der Fall des Robert Schumann (1990); West Germany; German	Jürgen Noll	
Robert Schumann	Inner Voices (2003); Canada	Sylvain Poirier	
Robert Schumann	Robert Schumann - Clara Wieck - Johannes Brahms (2006); Germany; German	Volker J. Ringe	
Robert Schumann	Schumann, Schubert und der Schnee (2006); Germany; German	Olaf Bär	
Robert Schumann	Geliebte Clara (2008); Germany, France, Hungary; German	Pascal Greggory	
Richard M. Sherman	Saving Mr. Banks (2013); UK, Australia, USA	Jason Schwartzman	
Robert B. Sherman	Saving Mr. Banks (2013); UK, Australia, USA	B. J. Novak	
Dmitri Shostakovich	Testimony (1987); Denmark, Netherlands, Sweden, West Germany, UK	Ben Kingsley	
Jean Sibelius	Sibelius (2003); Finland; Finnish	Martti Suosalo	
John Philip Sousa	Stars and Stripes Forever (1952); USA	Clifton Webb	
Eduard Strauss I	The Eternal Waltz (1954); West Germany; German	Eduard Strauss Jr.	
Eduard Strauss I	The Strauss Family (1972); UK	Tony Anholt	
Eduard Strauss I	Johann Strauss: The King Without a Crown (1987), Austria	Mathieu Carrière	
Eduard Strauss I	The Strauss Dynasty (1991); UK	Adrian Lukis	
Eduard Strauss I	Strauss: The King of 3/4 Time (1995); Canada, Czech Republic	Glen Peloso	
Johann Strauss I	Waltzes from Vienna (1934); UK	Edmund Gwenn	
Johann Strauss I	The Waltz King (1963); US	Brian Aherne	
Johann Strauss I	The Great Waltz (1972); USA	Nigel Patrick	
Johann Strauss I	The Strauss Family (1972); UK	Eric Woofe	
Johann Strauss I	The Strauss Dynasty (1991); UK	Anthony Higgins	
Johann Strauss II	Rosen aus dem Süden (1934); Germany; German	Paul Hörbiger	
Johann Strauss II	Waltzes from Vienna (1934); UK	Esmond Knight	
Johann Strauss II	The Great Waltz (1938); USA	Fernand Gravey	
Johann Strauss II	The Eternal Waltz (1954); West Germany; German	Bernhard Wicki	
Johann Strauss II	The Waltz King (1963); US	Kerwin Mathews	
Johann Strauss II	The Great Waltz (1972); USA	Horst Buchholz	
Johann Strauss II	The Strauss Family (1972); UK	Stuart Wilson	
Johann Strauss II	Farewell to St. Petersburg (1972); Soviet Union	Girt Yakovlev	
Johann Strauss II	Johann Strauss: The King Without a Crown (1987), Austria	Oliver Tobias	
Johann Strauss II	The Strauss Dynasty (1991); UK	Stephen McGann	
Johann Strauss II	Strauss: The King of 3/4 Time (1995); Canada, Czech Republic	Michael Riley	
Josef Strauss	The Eternal Waltz (1954); West Germany; German	Josef Hendrichs	
Josef Strauss	The Waltz King (1963); US	Peter Kraus	
Josef Strauss	The Great Waltz (1972); USA	James Faulkner	
Josef Strauss	The Strauss Family (1972); UK	Louis Selwyn / Nikolas Simmonds	
Josef Strauss	Strauss: The King of 3/4 Time (1995); Canada, Czech Republic	Hamish McEwan	
Richard Strauss	"Omnibus": Dance of the Seven Veils (1970); UK	Christopher Gable	
Richard Strauss	Bride of the Wind (2001); UK, Germany, Austria	Hans Steunzer	
Igor Stravinsky	Nijinsky (1980); USA	Ronald Pickup	
Igor Stravinsky	Dalí (1991); Spain, Bulgaria; Spanish	Vasil Dimitrov	
Igor Stravinsky	Riot at the Rite (2005); UK	Aidan McArdle	
Igor Stravinsky	Coco Chanel & Igor Stravinsky (2009); France; French, Russian, English	Mads Mikkelsen	
Soulima Stravinsky	Coco Chanel & Igor Stravinsky (2009); France; French, Russian, English	Nikita Ponomarenko	
Franz Xaver Süssmayr	Whom the Gods Love (1942); Germany, Austria; German	Erich Nikowitz	
Franz Xaver Süssmayr	Mozart (1982) TV series; France, Belgium, Canada, Italy, Switzerland; French	Alexander Kerst	
Thomas Tallis	The Tudors (2007); UK	Joe Van Moyland	
Giuseppe Tartini	Vivaldi (2013); USA, Belgium	Alfred Molina	
Carl Tausig	Wagner (1983); UK	Otto Clemens	
Pyotr Ilyich Tchaikovsky	The Life and Loves of Tschaikovsky (1939); Germany; German	Hans Stüwe	
Pyotr Ilyich Tchaikovsky	Heavenly Music (1943); USA	Lionel Royce	
Pyotr Ilyich Tchaikovsky	Carnegie Hall (1947); USA	Alfonso D'Artega	
Pyotr Ilyich Tchaikovsky	Song of My Heart (1948); USA	Frank Sundström	
Pyotr Ilyich Tchaikovsky	Tchaikovsky (1969); USSR; Russian	Innokenty Smoktunovsky	
Pyotr Ilyich Tchaikovsky	The Music Lovers (1970); UK	Richard Chamberlain	
Pyotr Ilyich Tchaikovsky	Tchaikovsky: The Creation of Genius (2007); UK	Ed Stoppard	
Pyotr Ilyich Tchaikovsky	Tchaikovsky: Fortune and Tragedy (2007); UK	Ed Stoppard	
Pyotr Ilyich Tchaikovsky	The Concert (2009); France	Mélanie Laurent	
Pyotr Ilyich Tchaikovsky	A Morte de Tchaikovsky (2009); Portugal; Portuguese	José Eduardo	
Pyotr Ilyich Tchaikovsky	Tchaikovsky's Wife (2022); Russian	Odin Biron	
Sigismond Thalberg	Song Without End (1960); USA	Erland Erlandsen	
Giuseppe Verdi	Giuseppe Verdi (1938); Italy; Italian	Fosco Giachetti	
Giuseppe Verdi	Verdi, the King of Melody (1953); Italy; Italian	Pierre Cressoy	
Giuseppe Verdi	Casa Ricordi (1954); Italy; Italian	Fosco Giachetti	
Giuseppe Verdi	The Life of Verdi (1982); Italy, France, UK, West Germany, Sweden; Italian	Ronald Pickup	
Pauline Viardot	La note bleue (1991); France, Germany; French	Noemi Nadelmann	
Heitor Villa-Lobos	Villa-Lobos: A Life of Passion (2000); Brazil; Portuguese	Marcos Palmeira, Antônio Fagundes	
Antonio Vivaldi	Red Venice (1989); France, Italy	Wojciech Pszoniak	
Antonio Vivaldi	Antonio Vivaldi, a Prince in Venice (2006); France, Italy	Stefano Dionisi	
Antonio Vivaldi	Vivaldi, the Red Priest (2009); UK, Italy	Steven Cree	
Antonio Vivaldi	Primavera (2025); France, Italy	Michele Riondino	
Richard Wagner see also: List of films about Richard Wagner	Magic Fire (1955); USA	Alan Badel	
Richard Wagner see also: List of films about Richard Wagner	Song Without End (1960); USA	Lyndon Brook	
Richard Wagner see also: List of films about Richard Wagner	Ludwig (1972); Italy, France; Italian, French	Trevor Howard	
Richard Wagner see also: List of films about Richard Wagner	Lisztomania (1975); UK	Paul Nicholas	
Richard Wagner see also: List of films about Richard Wagner	Liszt Ferenc (1982); Hungary; Hungarian	Tilo Prückner	
Richard Wagner see also: List of films about Richard Wagner	Wagner (1983); UK	Richard Burton	
Richard Wagner see also: List of films about Richard Wagner	Wahnfried (1986); Germany, France; German, French	Otto Sander	
Richard Wagner see also: List of films about Richard Wagner	Bruckners Entscheidung (1995); Germany; German	Joachim Kaiser	
Peter Warlock	Voices (from a Locked Room) (1995); UK, USA	Jeremy Northam, Benoît Langlais	
Carl Maria von Weber	Whom the Gods Love: The Original Story of Mozart and His Wife (1936); UK	Richard Goolden	
Carl Maria von Weber	Through the Forests and Through the Trees (1956); West Germany; German	Peter Arens	
Friedrich Wieck	Dreaming (1944); Germany; German	Friedrich Kayßler	
Friedrich Wieck	Song of Love (1947); USA (re-released in 1950 in a shorter version titled The Schumann Story, but the Friedrich Wieck character was cut out)	Leo G. Carroll	
Friedrich Wieck	Spring Symphony (1983); West Germany; German	Rolf Hoppe	
Friedrich Wieck	Der Fall des Robert Schumann (1990); West Germany; German	Edgar M. Böhlke	
Hugo Wolf	Mahler (1974); UK	David Collings	
Paul Wranitzky	Eroica (2003); UK	Peter Hanson	
Alexander von Zemlinsky	Bride of the Wind (2001); UK, Germany, Austria	Johannes Silberschneider	
Alexander von Zemlinsky	Mahler on the Couch (2010); Germany, Austria; German	Mathias Franz Stein	

== See also ==
- Beethoven in film
- Denham Concerto
- List of films using the music of Richard Wagner
- List of films about pianists
- List of composers in literature
