= List of films about pianists =

The following is a list of films about pianists or in which pianists play a significant role.

== Documentaries ==
- Antonia: A Portrait of the Woman (1974): A documentary about Antonia Brico.
- Art Tatum: The Art of Jazz Piano (1988): A documentary about Art Tatum.
- Arthur Rubinstein – The Love of Life (1969): A documentary about Arthur Rubinstein.
- Bloody Daughter (2012): A documentary about Martha Argerich
- Glass: A Portrait of Philip in Twelve Parts (2007): A documentary about composer Philip Glass.
- Jazz Is My Native Language (1983): A documentary about Toshiko Akiyoshi.
- Keith Jarrett: The Art of Improvisation (2005): A documentary about Keith Jarrett.
- The Lady in Number 6 (2013): A documentary about Alice Herz-Sommer.
- The Last Romantic (1985): A documentary about Vladimir Horowitz.
- Set the Piano Stool on Fire (2011): A documentary about Kit Armstrong.
- Seymour: An Introduction (2014): A documentary about Seymour Bernstein.
- Thelonious Monk: Straight, No Chaser (1988): A documentary about Thelonious Monk.
- Two Hands: The Leon Fleisher Story (2006): A documentary about Leon Fleisher.
- Wherever She Goes (1951): About the early life of Eileen Joyce in Australia.

== Films based on historical pianists ==
- Amadeus (1984): An American period biographical drama film directed by Miloš Forman.
- Behind the Candelabra (2013): A drama about the last years of the flamboyant pianist and showman Liberace (Michael Douglas) and the secret affair he had with young Scott Thorson (Matt Damon).
- Copying Beethoven (2006): A fictional take on the final year of composer Beethoven's (Ed Harris) life as he composes his Ninth Symphony.
- Chopin: Desire for Love (2002): A Polish biopic of Frédéric Chopin starring Piotr Adamczyk.
- The Eddy Duchin Story (1956): A biopic of Eddy Duchin starring Tyrone Power
- Great Balls of Fire! (1989): Film that follows the life of pianist and teen idol Jerry Lee Lewis as played by Dennis Quaid. It features many of the artist's hits such as Great Balls of Fire, Whole Lotta Shakin' Goin On, and Wild One.
- Geliebte Clara (2008): A biopic about pianist Clara Schumann and her marriage to composer Robert Schumann.
- Green Book (2018): A biographical comedy-drama inspired by the true story of a 1962 tour of the Deep South by African American classical and jazz pianist Don Shirley as played by Mahershala Ali.
- Immortal Beloved (1994): A biopic on the life of composer Ludwig van Beethoven, starring Gary Oldman. Moonlight Sonata, Emperor Concerto, Pathétique Sonata, Piano Trio No. 4 in D major, Op. 70/1, and Für Elise are among the piano pieces played.
- Lisztomania (1975): Fictional depiction of Franz Liszt
- Maestro (2023): A biographical film of pianist and composer Leonard Bernstein, starring Bradley Cooper.
- Moonlight Sonata (1937): A drama film starring pianist Ignacy Jan Paderewski as himself.
- The Music Lovers (1970): Depicts Tchaikovsky as a piano teacher struggling to maintain a heterosexual marriage.
- Passion (1999): A biopic of the pianist and composer Percy Grainger, starring Richard Roxburgh
- The Pianist (2002): Depicts the true story of Polish pianist Władysław Szpilman, played by Adrien Brody, in the Jewish Ghetto of 1940s Warsaw. Beethoven's Moonlight Sonata and Chopin's Nocturne No. 20 in C♯ minor and Ballade No. 1 were some of the more popular pieces played.
- Ray (2004): A biopic of Ray Charles, starring Jamie Foxx
- Rhapsody in Blue (1945): A biopic of George Gershwin, starring Robert Alda
- Rocketman (2019): A biographical musical drama film based on the life and music of British musician Elton John, starring Taron Egerton.
- Scott Joplin (1977): A biopic of the pianist and composer Scott Joplin, starring Billy Dee Williams
- Shine (1996): About the life of David Helfgott, starring Geoffrey Rush and Sir John Gielgud; Sergei Rachmaninoff's Piano Concerto No. 3 (referred to as "the Rach 3") is prominently featured.
- Song of Love (1947): Portrays the relationship between Robert Schumann and his wife Clara Schumann (played by Katharine Hepburn), including their live-in tenant Johannes Brahms.
- A Song to Remember (1945): About the life of Frédéric Chopin, starring Cornel Wilde; George Sand is played by Merle Oberon. The pianist on the soundtrack was José Iturbi, but the pianist whose hands were shown on-screen was Ervin Nyiregyházi.
- Song Without End (1960): About the life of Franz Liszt, starring Dirk Bogarde. The pianist on the soundtrack was Jorge Bolet.
- They Shot the Piano Player (2023): Animated docudrama about the disappearance and murder of bossa nova pianist Tenório Jr..
- Thirty Two Short Films About Glenn Gould (1993): A collection of documentary type footage and reenactments of the life of pianist Glenn Gould. Several well known piano pieces are played including selections from Bach's Goldberg Variations, English Suites, and The Well-Tempered Clavier; Beethoven's Sonata No. 13 in E♭ major, Op. 27/1 and Sonata No. 17 in D minor, Op. 31/2; and Schoenberg's Sechs kleine Klavierstücke, Op. 19.

== Films about fictional pianists ==
- Andhadhun (2018): Indian Hindi-language crime thriller film.
- Anna Alt (1945): German drama film.
- Avenue Montaigne (2006): also known as Fauteuils d'orchestre is a French film.
- The Beast with Five Fingers (1946). The occupants of an isolated Italian villa are stalked by the severed, crawling hand of a recently deceased pianist. Steiner weaves Brahms' arrangement of Bach's Chaconne for the left hand into his score. The hands of pianist Ervin Nyíregyházi were shown on-screen.
- The Case of the Frightened Lady (1940): Lead actor Marius Goring, a talented pianist, actually performed the music, fictionally composed by his character Lord Lebanon (actual music by Jack Beaver).
- The Competition (1980): A drama portraying a story of professional drive and romance between two fictional pianists played by Richard Dreyfuss and Amy Irving. One of the pieces featured is Prokofiev's Piano Concerto No. 3 in C major.
- Dangerous Moonlight (1941): Stars Anton Walbrook as a pianist who plays the Warsaw Concerto. The soundtrack was performed by Louis Kentner.
- De battre mon coeur s'est arrêté (2005)
- The Fabulous Baker Boys (1989): Drama about two pianist brothers (played by Jeff and Beau Bridges) and a singer. Many jazz/pop pieces are featured in the film, including "Can't Take My Eyes Off You", "Ten Cents a Dance", "The Look of Love", "Makin' Whoopee", "You're Sixteen", and "My Funny Valentine".
- Fingers (1978): Drama about a pianist (Harvey Keitel) with an unpleasant day job.
- Five Easy Pieces (1970): Drama about a former piano prodigy, played by Jack Nicholson estranged from his family. The soundtrack includes movements from Mozart's Concerto in E♭ major, K.271, Fantasy in D minor, K.397, and Chopin's Preludes.
- Four Minutes (2006)
- The Getting of Wisdom (1977): Drama about a young girl's struggle for acceptance and love in a girls' school in colonial Australia. The setting is her piano studies for her performance at a competition.
- Getting Started (1979): An animated short film about the procrastination of a pianist.
- Grand Piano (2013): A thriller film about a pianist (Elijah Wood) who is threatened by a sniper who would kill him if he plays one wrong note.
- The Hands of Orlac (1924)
- The Hands of Orlac (1960)
- Hangover Square (1945): music by Bernard Hermann, performed off-screen by Ignace Hilsberg. George Harvey Bone is confronted with his crimes at the premiere of his concerto.
- Impromptu (1991): A romance film depicting the relationship between Frédéric Chopin (played by Hugh Grant) and George Sand (Judy Davis). Julian Sands also makes an appearance as Franz Liszt. The film features works by Chopin: Ballade No. 1, selections from Preludes, Op. 28, Minute Waltz, Fantaisie-Impromptu; and Liszt: Dante Sonata, Transcendental Etude No. 4 "Mazeppa".
- I've Always Loved You (1946)
- Je te mangerais. (2007)
- La La Land (2016): Ryan Gosling plays a jazz pianist Sebastian Wilder, trying to make it in Hollywood.
- The Last Song (2010): Based on a Nicholas Sparks novel and centered on a rebellious girl, Ronnie, who is sent to a Southern beach town for the summer to stay with her father. Through their mutual love of music, the estranged duo learn to reconnect. Ronnie plays the piece she helped finished on her father's funeral. This movie starred Miley Cyrus and Liam Hemsworth.
- The Legend of 1900 (1998)
- Love Story (1944): music by Hubert Bath, performed off-screen by Harriet Cohen, who worked with actress Margaret Lockwood to teach her the piece for the sake of realism. Lissa Campbell, a terminally ill pianist, races to finish a performance before she dies.
- Low Down (2014): Fictional story of a celebrated jazz pianist and his descent into heroin addiction.
- Madame Sousatzka (1988): Fictional story of a Bengali piano prodigy (Navin Chowdhry) who must choose between pleasing his mother and his talented but unsuccessful teacher (Shirley MacLaine). The lead character was based on real pianist Maria Levinskaya, and the prodigy pupil on Harold Rubens. Some of the better known featured pieces are Schubert's Impromptu No. 4, Scriabin's Etude in D♯ minor, Op. 8/12, Chopin's C minor Prelude and Polonaise in A♭ major, Schumann's Carnaval and Piano Concerto in A minor, Brahms's Concerto No. 1 in D minor, and Beethoven's Appassionata Sonata.
- Men of Two Worlds (1946): music by Arthur Bliss, performed off-screen by Eileen Joyce.Tanganyikan concert pianist Kisenga returns from his studies in England to Africa to perform his Piano Concerto.
- The Mephisto Waltz (1971): A horror film where a dying pianist arranges to change souls with an aspiring musician, played by Alan Alda, so he can continue to play piano. As the title suggests, the film makes much use of Franz Liszt's Mephisto Waltzes.
- Nodame Cantabile (2007): Based on the manga of the same name; Shinichi Chiaki is a top student at Momogaoka College of Music and has secret ambitions to become a conductor. There, he meets Megumi Noda or 'Nodame', a piano student at Momogaoka, notorious for messiness and eccentric behavior. Despite being very talented, Nodame prefers to play by ear rather than according to the musical score; thus, she is regarded as sloppy and playful. When they meet by accident, Nodame quickly falls in love, but it takes much longer for Chiaki to even begin to appreciate Nodame's unusual qualities. Their relationship causes them both to develop and grow.
- Nothing Lasts Forever: a 1984 American science-fiction comedy film directed by Tom Schiller, starring Zach Galligan, Lauren Tom, Bill Murray, Dan Aykroyd, Sam Jaffe and Mort Sahl. The film opens to Adam Beckett (Zach Galligan) reluctantly performing as a purported pianist to an audience in New York City. Shortly before the scheduled release date, Metro-Goldwyn-Mayer announced Nothing Lasts Forever was being postponed. MGM never released the film theatrically, nor has it ever been available on home video in any format in the United States.
- The Page Turner (2006)
- The Passionate Pianist (1957): An Australian TV movie that about a teenage boy who prefers football to practicing piano.
- The Pianist (1991): Two sisters are infatuated with a Japanese pianist played by Eiji Okuda.
- The Pianist (1998): A drama starring Serge Reggiani and Laurent Terzieff that follows the contrasting lives of two pianist friends set during the Spanish Civil War.
- The Piano (1993): A period drama about a psychologically mute Scottish woman who expresses herself with both sign language and her piano playing.
- A Piano for Mrs. Cimino (1982): A made-for-TV Film starring Bette Davis.
- The Piano Teacher (2001)
- Secret (2007): A Taiwanese drama about a music student majoring in piano.
- September Affair (1950): A fictional story about an architect and a pianist who is preparing to play Rachmaninoff's 2nd Piano Concerto. They have an affair when they are wrongly believed to have perished on board an airliner that crashed into the sea.
- The Seventh Veil (1945): A fictional story about a piano student and her controlling uncle, played by Ann Todd and James Mason. The uncredited pianist was Eileen Joyce, who played the Rachmaninoff 2nd Concerto, Grieg's Concerto in A minor and solo pieces by Mozart, Chopin and Beethoven (the slow movement of the Pathétique Sonata assumed a particular importance in the film).
- Shoot the Piano Player (1960): French New Wave film about a washed out pianist (Charles Aznavour).
- Strange Fascination (1952): Film noir about a pianist (Hugo Haas) and a femme fatale (Cleo Moore).
- The Talented Mr. Ripley (1999): Psycho-drama with Matt Damon (as the pianist), Gwyneth Paltrow, Jude Law and Cate Blanchett.
- Tokyo Sonata (2008): Film about a middle-class family in Tokyo, the Sasakis, which consists of Ryūhei Sasaki, his wife Megumi, and their two sons Takashi and Kenji. The final scene depicts Kenji performing "Clair de Lune" from the Suite bergamasque at his audition with Megumi, Ryūhei, and his piano teacher watching. His performance is flawless.
- Valerie and Her Week of Wonders (1970)
- Vitus (2006): A child prodigy pianist (Teo Gheorghiu) rebels against his overprotective parents in order to seek refuge with his grandfather (Bruno Ganz).
- The Walking Dead (1936)
- While I Live (1947): music by Charles Williams, performed off-screen by Arthur Dulay. Composer Olwen Trevelyan dies after finishing her piano masterpiece, which is then used to keep her memory alive.
- The Wonder Kid (1952): Sebastian Giro (Bobby Henrey), a ten year old musical prodigy, is exploited by Mr Gorik (Elwyn Brook-Jones).
- The World of Henry Orient (1964): Concert pianist Henry Orient (Peter Sellers) is followed around New York City by two teenage girls while pursuing an affair with a married woman.
- Your Lie in April (2016): Based on the manga of the same name; A child prodigy pianist (Kōsei Arima) loses his interest in piano after his abusive and demanding mother dies. During his teenhood, his classmate Kaori Miyazono would help him play the piano again.

== See also ==
- Beethoven in film
- Denham Concerto
- List of composers depicted on film: Many of the composers listed were pianists.
