= List of films about Richard Wagner =

This is a list of biographical films featuring the composer Richard Wagner (1813-1883), either as a central or significant character.

- The 1913 feature-length German silent film Richard Wagner was directed by Carl Froelich, with the Italian musician Giuseppe Becce in the lead role - he also created the musical score, as Wagner's music was going to be too expensive. In 2013, the German composer Bernd Schultheis adapted and prepared Becce’s piano score (all that exists) for orchestral performance - including music by Haydn, Mozart, Beethoven, Rossini and others. Armin Brunner (Switzerland) created an adaptation in 1983, rev.2012, using selections by Beethoven, Mozart, Wagner, Liszt and Mahler. For a 2014 screening at London’s Barbican Cinema, American composer/pianist Jean Hasse premiered a score with her original music, and incorporated Wagner’s music diegetically, when 'Wagner' performs or conducts on screen.
  - A documentary with the same title was made in 1925.
- The 1955 film Magic Fire was about some significant events in Wagner's life. It starred Alan Badel as Wagner.
- Helmut Käutner's 1955 film Ludwig II: Glanz und Ende eines Königs has Paul Bildt portraying Wagner.
- Wagner was portrayed by Lyndon Brook in the 1960 film Song Without End, which was principally about Wagner's father-in-law Franz Liszt.
- Luchino Visconti's 1972 film Ludwig has Trevor Howard portraying Wagner.
- Hans-Jürgen Syberberg's 1972 film Ludwig: Requiem for a Virgin King has Gerhard März portraying Wagner.
- The 1975 Ken Russell film Lisztomania portrayed Wagner (played by Paul Nicholas) as a vampiric Nazi. Wagner was the antagonist of the film, which starred Roger Daltrey as Franz Liszt.
- A film of the composer's life, Wagner, was made in 1983 by the director Tony Palmer. The cast included Richard Burton as the composer, John Gielgud, Laurence Olivier, Ralph Richardson and Vanessa Redgrave.
- The 1986 film Wahnfried was about Wagner and was screened out of competition at the 1987 Cannes Film Festival.
- Peter Sehr's & Marie Noelle's 2012 film Ludwig II has Edgar Selge portraying Wagner.

== See also ==
- List of composers depicted on film
