= Révész =

Révész is a Hungarian surname, meaning "ferryman". Notable people with the surname include:

- Andrés Révész (1890–1970), Hungarian-Spanish writer
- Bulcsú Révész (born 2007), Hungarian snooker player
- Géza Révész (1902–1977), Hungarian military officer and politician
- Géza Révész (1878–1955), Hungarian-Dutch psychologist
- György Révész (1927–2003), Hungarian screenwriter and film director
- Imre Révész, birth name of Emery Reves (1904–1981), Hungarian-born writer, publisher, art collector
- Judith Révész (1915–2018), Hungarian-Dutch potter and sculptor
- Julianna Révész (born 1983), Hungarian fencer
- Levente Révész (born 2005), Hungarian racing driver
- Máriusz Révész (born 1967), Hungarian politician
- Pál Révész (1934–2022), Hungarian mathematician
- Richard Revesz (born 1958), American lawyer
- Tamás Révész (born 1946), Hungarian-American photographer
