= Gustav Kafka =

Austrian academic (1883–1953)

Gustav Kafka (23 July 1883 – 12 February 1953) was an Austrian philosopher and psychologist. One of Kafka's most outstanding contributions to the realms of psychology have been his critique of fundamentals and methods, such as his criticism of behaviorism, and other articles in which he revealed new points of view based on concrete investigation.

His son Gustav Eduard Kafka (1907–1974) was a sociologist and jurist.

== Early life and education ==
Kafka was born on 23 July 1883 in Vienna. He attended school in Vienna and later joined the school that was organised by Schotten monks. He became conversant in both English and French from learning at home as a child, then entered the University of Vienna in 1902, where he studied law for one semester before shifting studies to philosophy and psychology. After a semester at G. E. Miller's laboratory in Göttingen, where he became acquainted with Geza Revesz and David Katz, Kafka enrolled at Leipzig where in 1904 he received the doctor's degree from Wundt for a thesis entitled Ueber das Ansteigen der Toner- regung. In 1905, he went to Munich to continue his studies under Theodor Lipps. Later he worked there under Erich Becher and was appointed professor at Munich in 1915.

Kafka participated in the First World War as an Austrian reserve soldier. Towards the end of that war, he and his friend Geza Revesz, then at the University of Budapest, were commissioned to set up a psychotechnical service for the Austro-Hungarian Army. In 1923, Kafka succeeded Karl Bühler as professor of psychology, philosophy, and pedagogy at the Technische Hochschule in Dresden, but in 1935 political difficulties and ill health combined to force him to resign prematurely. Just before its close, the Second World War added to his misfortunes by the destruction of his home and all his property in an air raid. The collapse of the war led not to his academic reinstatement but at first to hunger and dire distress. In 1947, however, he received an appointment as professor of philosophy and psychology at the University of Würzburg, where he continued to work until his second and final retirement in the summer of 1952. In his seventieth year, on 12 February 1953, he died in his newly acquired home in Veitshochheim near Würzburg.

== Literature works ==
- Einführung in die Tierpsychologie
- Aristoteles, 1922
- Geschichtsphilosophie der Philosophiegeschichte, 1933
- Naturgesetz, Freiheit und Wunder, 1940
- Was sind Rassen, 1949
- Freiheit und Anarchie, 1949
