= Emil Heß =

Swiss actor

- Born: 3 February 1889; Wald, Zurich, Switzerland
- Died: 2 March 1945 (aged 56)

Emil Heß (3 February 1889, in Wald, Zurich – 2 March 1945, in Zurich) was a Swiss actor on stage and screen.

== Personal life ==
Heß married Elizabeth Ellinghaus by whom he had three sons Wolfgang, Urs and Migg.

Urs Hess (1940) and Migg Hess (1943) followed in the footsteps of their father and played in Zurich venues such as the Playhouse and the Bernhardt Theatre. They also had roles in a few films during the 1950s.

== Career ==
=== Selected stage performances ===
- Woyzeck (1922, 1927)

=== Filmography ===
- Herbstzauber (1918) as Graf Victor von Ulmrode
- Seltsame Seelen (1918)
- L'ouragan sur la montagne (1922)
- Fredericus Rex (1922, part 3) as Minister August Friedrich Von Boden
- Jud Süß (1940) as Schmied Hans Bogner
- Das Herz der Königin (1940) as Lord Douglas
- Die keusche Geliebte (1940) as Exzellenz Baroux
- The Swedish Nightingale (1941) as Thorwaldsen
- Der Strom (1941)
- The Way to Freedom (1941) as Müetli
- Das tapfere Schneiderlein (1941) as König
- Tanz mit dem Kaiser (1941)
- Wenn du noch eine Heimat hast (1942) as Ullrichs
- Wedding in Barenhof (1942) as Königliche Hoheit
- Between Heaven and Earth (1942) as Valentin, Buchhalter
- Andreas Schlüter (1942) as Counsellor Dankelman
- Die Entlassung (1942) as Grand Duke Vladimir
- Love Me (1942)
- A Flea in Her Ear (1943) as Großvater Christian Lohhof
- Back Then (1943) as Alvarez, Veras Verteidiger
- Dreaming (1944) as Dr. Körber
- Herr Sanders lebt gefährlich (1944) as Gil Schnyder
- Aufruhr der Herzen (1944) as Martin Atzinger
- Der Engel mit dem Saitenspiel (1944) as Linus Lanzinger, bayr. Postillon
- Der Erbförster (1945)
- Kamerad Hedwig (1945) as Vater Schulz (unfinished film)
- Jan und die Schwindlerin (1947) as Hinnerk Remmers
- Jugendliebe (1947)
- Die Kreuzelschreiber (1950) as Großbauer
- Erzieherin gesucht (1950) as Revendonk (final film role)
