= Ludwig van Beethoven in film =

The composer Ludwig van Beethoven has been the subject of a number of biographical films.

== List of films ==
A now-lost French silent film called Beethoven was mentioned in the press in January 1913, and there were at least a further six silent films about Beethoven before 1927.

The Life of Beethoven (German: Das Leben des Beethoven) is a 1927 Austrian silent drama film directed by Hans Otto and starring Fritz Kortner as Beethoven.

Un grand amour de Beethoven was directed in 1936 by Abel Gance; it stars Harry Baur.

Albert Bassermann portrayed Beethoven in the 1941 film The Great Awakening.

Steven Geray portrayed Beethoven in the 1943 short film Heavenly Music (1943).

Eroica is a 1949 Austrian film depicting the life and works of Beethoven (Ewald Balser). It was entered into the 1949 Cannes Film Festival. The film is directed by Walter Kolm-Veltée, produced by Guido Bagier with Walter Kolm-Veltée and written by Walter Kolm-Veltée with Franz Tassié.

Erich von Stroheim portrayed Beethoven in the 1955 French film, Napoléon.

In 1962, Walt Disney produced a made-for-television, largely fictionalised, life of Beethoven titled The Magnificent Rebel, starring Karlheinz Böhm as Beethoven. The film was given a two-part premiere on the Walt Disney anthology television series, and was released to theatres in Europe.

Composer and film-maker Mauricio Kagel made Ludwig van in 1969 after the work was commissioned by German broadcaster Westdeutscher Rundfunk for the bicentenary of Beethoven's birth in 1970. The first part of the film is shot from the point of view of Beethoven, who walks around late 1960s Bonn, including paying a visit to his birthplace. The second part includes a number of scenes focusing on modern day perceptions of Beethoven. The film's published score was constructed by Kagel from random pages from Beethoven's compositions, which had been used to decorate the Beethoven-Haus in the film, and the score's performance instructions allowed performers a great deal of leeway in interpreting it, giving them license to follow the pages in any order, omit pages, and to incorporate Beethoven music not already included in the score. In fact, Kagel's own recording of the film score is based on extracts of Beethoven's works not present in the published version. The film was controversial at the time and received a generally hostile critical reception in both West and East Germany.

Beethoven – Days in a Life is a 1976 feature film directed by Horst Seemann and produced by the former East German DEFA Studio for Feature Film. Beethoven is portrayed by Donatas Banionis. The film covers Beethoven's life in Vienna between 1813 and 1819.

Beethoven's Nephew is a 1985 French-German feature film directed by Paul Morrissey and starring Wolfgang Reichmann as Beethoven.

Beethoven was portrayed by Clifford David in Bill & Ted's Excellent Adventure (1989) as one of the historical figures kidnapped to fulfil a school history class assignment by the time travelling protagonists. Their clueless phonetic mispronunciation of his name as Beeth-Oven is a recurring comic device.

Neil Munro portrayed Beethoven in the 1992 Canadian television movie Beethoven Lives Upstairs; it won a Primetime Emmy Award for Outstanding Children's Program.

Gary Oldman portrayed Beethoven in the 1994 film Immortal Beloved, written and directed by Bernard Rose. The story follows Beethoven's secretary and first biographer, Anton Schindler (played by Jeroen Krabbé), as he attempts to ascertain the true identity of the Unsterbliche Geliebte (Immortal Beloved) addressed in three letters found in the composer's private papers after his death.

In 2003 a made-for-television BBC/Opus Arte film Eroica dramatised the 1804 first performance of the Eroica Symphony at the palace of Prince Lobkowitz. Ian Hart was cast as Beethoven, while Jack Davenport played Prince Lobkowitz; the Orchestre Révolutionnaire et Romantique conducted by Sir John Eliot Gardiner perform the Symphony in its entirety during the film.

In a 2005 three-part BBC miniseries, Beethoven was played by Paul Rhys.

Copying Beethoven (2006), starring Ed Harris as Beethoven is a fictionalised account of Beethoven's production of his Ninth Symphony.

In the 2020 German biographical film Louis van Beethoven, three actors play Beethoven across his life, including Tobias Moretti as the adult Beethoven.

== See also ==
- List of composers depicted on film
