= Géza Révész (psychologist) =

Hungarian-Dutch psychologist

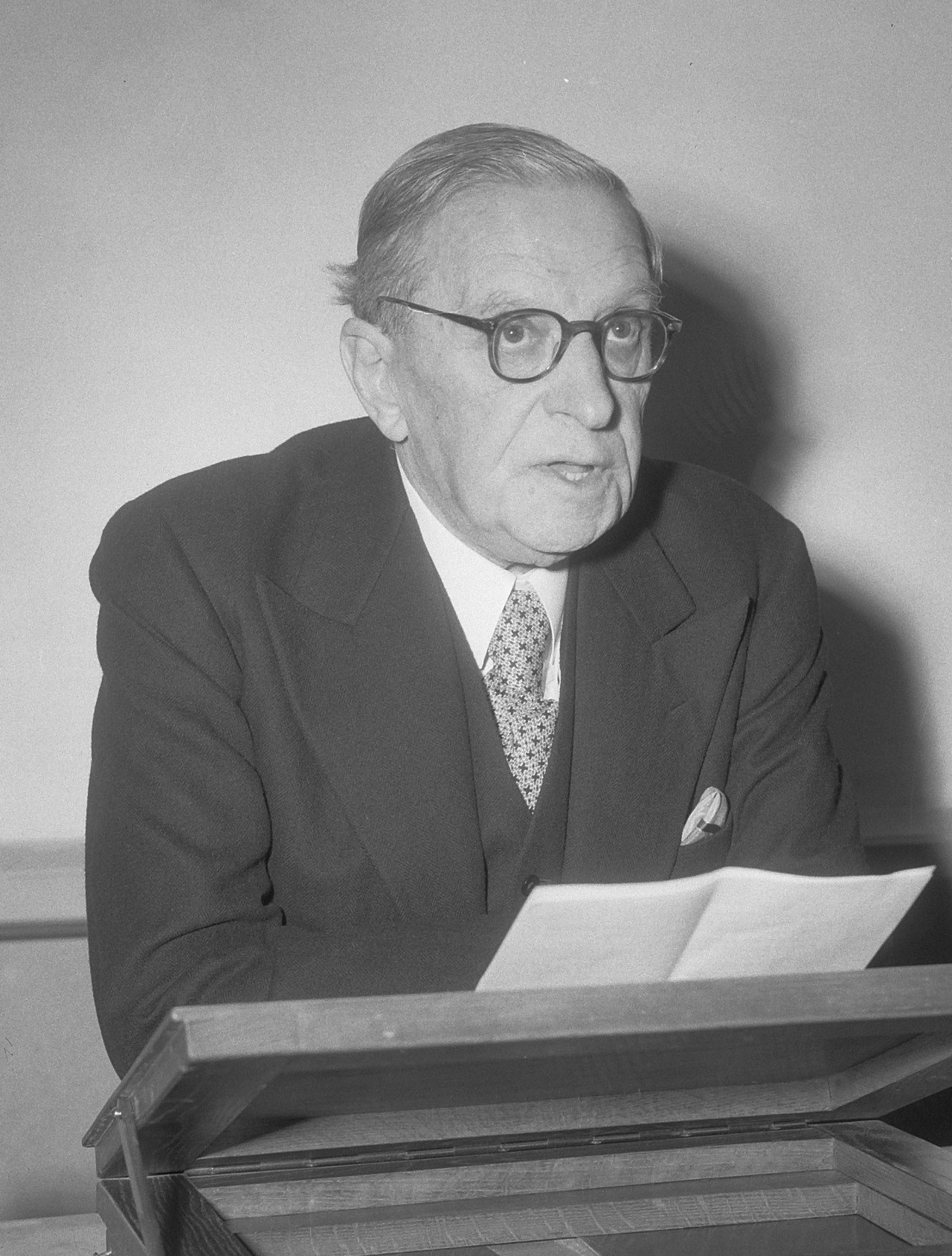
- Géza Révész in 1953
- Born: 9 December 1878; Siófok, Hungary
- Died: 19 August 1955 (aged 76); Amsterdam, Netherlands
- Occupation: Psychologist
- Children: Judith Révész

Géza Révész (9 December 1878 — 19 August 1955) was a Hungarian-Dutch psychologist of Jewish heritage, and is regarded as one of the pioneers of European psychology.

== Life ==
Révész was born in the Siófok, Hungary, a town located at Lake Balaton, where his father owned a famous vineyard. He studied law in Budapest and received his doctorate in 1902, when he finished his dissertation entitled Das Trauerjahr der Witwe.

Révész continued his studies at various German universities, including in Göttingen. While in Göttingen, he studied psychology with Georg Elias Müller, with whom he completed his doctorate and his thesis Über die vom Weiß ausgehende Schwächung der Wirksamkeit farbiger Lichtreize in 1905. During this time, Révész also became friends with phenomenological psychologists David Katz, Gustav Kafka and Edgar Rubin, who all played a role in the emergence of Gestalt psychology.

In 1906, Révész returned to Budapest, and went to work at the University of Budapest. He was assistant to the Austrian physiologist Franz Tangl. The late psychologist Imre Hermann was his assistant there. Révész worked at the university as an experimental psychologist. Initially, he studied hearing. In 1913, he proposed observing pitches for a two-component model. From 1909 to 1915, he studied musical prodigy Ervin Nyiregyházi. Révész was also a professor of psychology during his time at the University of Budapest.

In 1920, at the invitation of Gerard Heymans, Révész left Hungary for the Netherlands. At the University of Amsterdam, he was appointed as private teacher and began his research into the sense of touch. Along with Philip Kohnstamm, Révész ran the psychological-pedagogical laboratory, but this did not last long due to lack of funds.

In 1932, Révész was awarded a full professorship in the Faculty of Mathematics and Physics at the University of Amsterdam. In that capacity, he was a promoter of Adriaan de Groot and Nico Frijda. With David Katz, Révész founded in 1935 the journal Acta Psychologica . In 1933, he opened his own psychological laboratory, with 40 rooms and an auditorium, which was unprecedented at that time in Europe. He worked there with Philip Kohnstamm, with whom he fled the Netherlands in 1938 because the growing situation in Germany.

Révész died at the age of 76 in Amsterdam. His work on the psychology of music is still relevant today. The Pierson Révész Library of the University of Amsterdam was named after him. The filmmaker/photographer Emile Moerkerken was a staunch supporter of Révész.
