= God Rot Tunbridge Wells! =

1985 British musical television film

God Rot Tunbridge Wells! is a 1985 British musical television film directed by Tony Palmer, written by John Osborne and starring Trevor Howard, Christopher Bramwell and Dave Griffiths. It was aired on Channel 4 in 1985 and was made to mark the 300th anniversary of Handel's birth.

== Plot ==
In his old age in London, the German composer George Frideric Handel reflects over his life and musical career.

== Cast ==
- Trevor Howard – Elderly Handel
- Christopher Bramwell – Young Handel
- Dave Griffiths – Handel in middle age
- Isabella Connell – Princess of Wales
- Anne Downie – Vittoria Tarquini
- Beth Robens – Handel's Mother
- Simon Donald – Prince Ruspoli

== Music ==
Musical excerpts used are:

- Messiah (I know that my redeemer liveth) - Elizabeth Harwood, (But who may abide) - Emma Kirkby
- Xerxes (Ombra mai fu) - James Bowman
- Acis and Galatea (Oh happy we) Valerie Masterson, Anthony Rolfe-Johnson
- Judas Maccabæus (See the conquering hero) Judith Howarth, Lynn Anderson
- Ode for the birthday of Queen Anne (Let envy the conceal her head) - John Shirley-Quirk
- Concerto for organ opus 7 No.5 - Simon Preston
- Suite for keyboard no. 7, HWV 432 (Passacaglia) - Andrei Gavrilov
- Excerpts from the Music for the Royal Fireworks, Water Music, and The Arrival of the Queen of Sheba played by the English Chamber Orchestra, Charles Mackerras

== Locations ==
The film was shot for free at the Earl of Oxford and Asquith's house (for Brook Street, London), Chatsworth House for a banquet scene, Drumlanrig Castle for a grand house visited by the boy Handel, as well as other homes of English aristocracy. Palmer commented that "I had a million dollars worth of locations, and all for 3/6d".
