= Judith Révész =

Hungarian-Dutch potter and sculptor

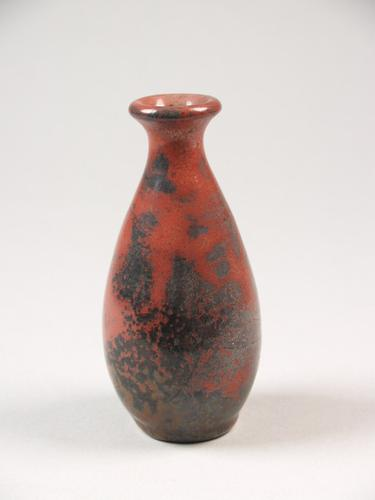
Vase with elongated wall and spreading neck covered with gray-red glaze by Judith Laqueur-Révész, 1952

Judith Magdolna Laqueur-Révész (15 July 1915 – 17 April 2018) was a Hungarian-Dutch potter and sculptor.

== Life and work ==
Judith Magdolna Révész was born in Budapest in July 1915, the daughter of psychologist Géza Révész and art historian Magdolna Révész-Alexander. In 1920, she moved with her parents from Hungary to the Netherlands. She rejected the Dutch art education, and received a private education (1934-1937) at the School of Applied Arts in Budapest by sculptor Mark Vedres.

In 1938, she became a freelance potter in Amsterdam. She was in close contact with Bert Nienhuis and Luigi de Lerma. She made especially earthenware utensils and ceramics small plastic, often inspired by Hungarian folk art. She made portraits, which were cast in bronze. She married a German lawyer, Henric Jochem Willem Ernst (Hein) Laqueur (1914-1990) in 1941. The couple had a son and a daughter. In 1957, the family moved to The Hague. She exhibited regularly since 1938, including in 1959/1960 in a duo exhibition with Maurits Cornelis Escher at the Utrecht Society Kunstliefde.

For the retreat l'Elefante Felice of Prince Bernhard in Porto Ercole, Italy, in 1960 Révész made a tile picture of an elephant. After the demolition of the villa in 2012, the work returned to the Netherlands and was donated to the Dutch Tile Museum.

Révész died in April 2018 in Malcesine at the age of 102.

== See also ==
- List of Dutch ceramists
