= Dreaming (1944 German film) =

1944 film

- Directed by: Harald Braun
- Written by: Harald Braun; Herbert Witt
- Produced by: Fritz Thiery
- Starring: Hilde Krahl; Mathias Wieman; Friedrich Kayssler
- Cinematography: Robert Baberske
- Edited by: Wolfgang Wehrum
- Music by: Werner Eisbrenner
- Production company: UFA
- Distributed by: Deutsche Filmvertriebs
- Release date: 3 May 1944
- Running time: 110 minutes
- Country: Germany
- Language: German
- Budget: 2 million ℛ︁ℳ︁ (equivalent to €8 million in 2021)

Dreaming (German: Träumerei) is a 1944 German historical musical drama film directed by Harald Braun and starring Hilde Krahl, Mathias Wieman and Friedrich Kayssler. It portrays the lives of the pianist Clara Schumann and her composer husband Robert Schumann.

It was shot at the Babelsberg and Tempelhof Studios in Berlin and on location around Xanten in the Rhineland. The film's sets were designed by the art directors Emil Hasler and Walter Kutz. Considered an important national film, the production received financial assistance from the government, and had a total budget of over two million reichsmarks. It premiered in Zwickau, the birthplace of Robert Schumann, two days before it was first screened at the Marmorhaus cinema in the capital. Originally, the film was going to star Zarah Leander as Clara Schumann, and movie posters featuring her were even distributed. However, Leander fled to Sweden, due to the ongoing war, and was recast.

The future star Hildegard Knef shot some scenes, which would have marked her film debut, but these were left out of the final cut.

== Cast ==
- Hilde Krahl as Clara Wieck Schumann
- Mathias Wieman as Robert Schumann
- Friedrich Kayssler as Friedrich Wieck
- Elly Burgmer as Fräulein Leser
- Ullrich Haupt as Johannes Brahms
- Emil Lohkamp as Franz Liszt
- Erika Helmke as Madame Hülsebusch
- Rudolf Drexler as Tausch, Konzertmeister
- Paul Henckels as Baron Fölkersam
- Ernst Karchow as Gerichtspräsident
- Emil Hess as Dr. Körber
- Carl Napp as Bürgermeister
- Karl Hellmer as Pistazy
- Helmuth Schneider as Student
- Walter Tarrach as Flügeladjutant
- Leni Sponholz as Hausmädchen
- Bruno Harprecht as König Karl IV. von Schweden
- Waldo Favre as Kapellmeister
- Clemens Hasse as Clemens Rollfuß
- Rudolf Klix as Würdenträger am Königshof
- Astrid Seiderer as Ballonverkäuferin beim Karneval
- Toni Tetzlaff as Konzertbesucherin
- Hella Thornegg as Solistin im Chor

== Bibliography ==
- Bock, Hans-Michael; Bergfelder, Tim, eds. (2009). The Concise Cinegraph: Encyclopaedia of German Cinema. New York: Berghahn Books. ISBN 978-1-57181-655-9.
