= Joachim Bauer =

German medical doctor

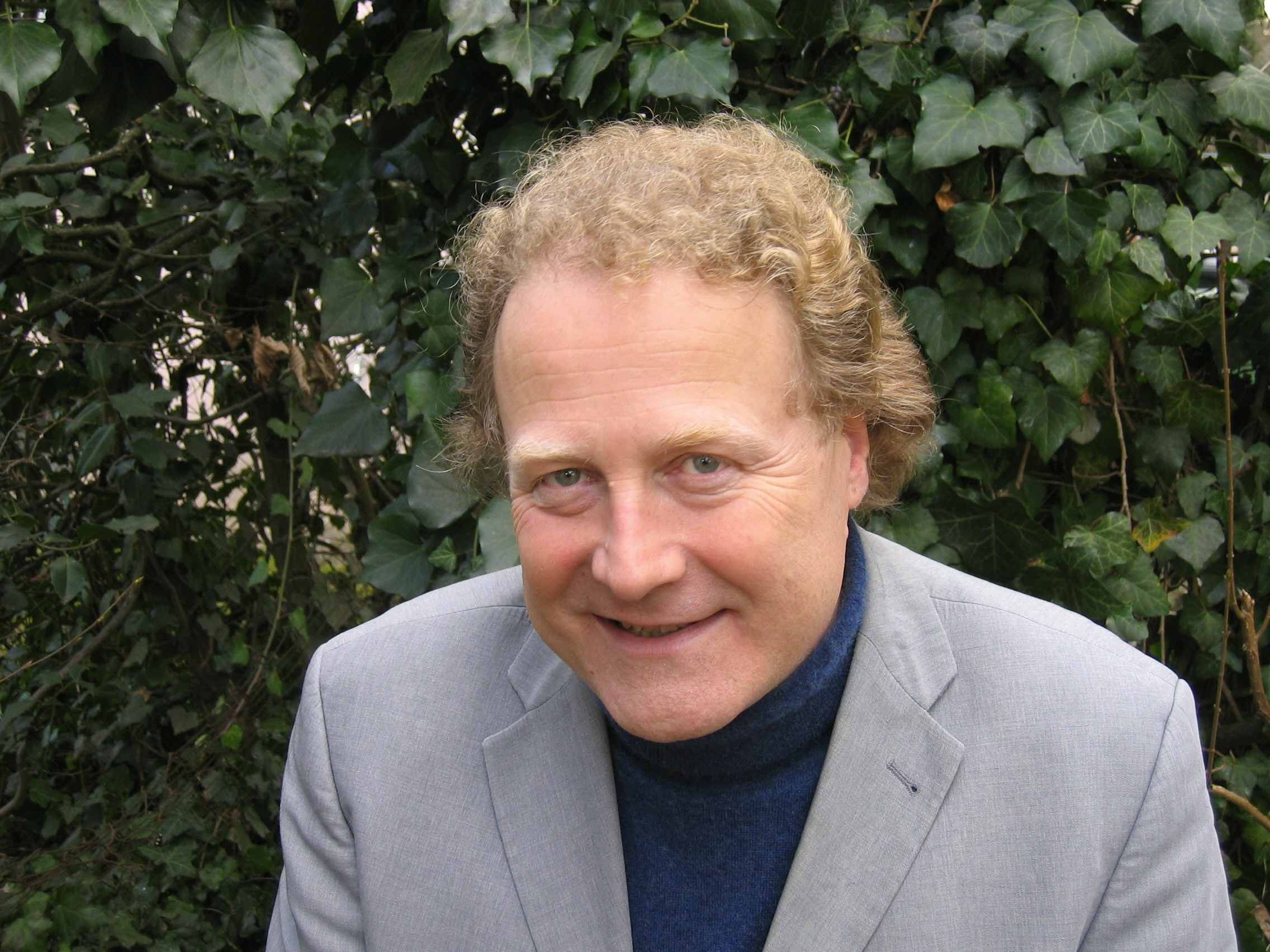
- Joachim Bauer (2015)
- Born: 21 October 1951 (age 74); Tübingen, Germany
- Known for: Neurobiology, book author
- Scientific career
- Workplaces: University of Freiburg

Joachim Bauer (born 21 October 1951 in Tübingen) is a German medical doctor with education in internal medicine, psychiatry and psychosomatic medicine. He teaches as a professor at the University of Freiburg. Bauer is the author of several scientific non-fiction books.

== Books ==
Bauer has published several non-fiction books in the areas of brain and genomic science. In Das Gedächtnis des Körpers – Wie Beziehungen und Lebensstile unsere Gene steuern, he discusses the interplay between the processes in the brain, determined by interpersonal relationships, and the biology of the body. He explains some mental health disorders and their genesis, especially post-traumatic stress disorder (PTSD) and depression.

In Warum ich fühle was du fühlst – Intuitive Kommunikation und das Geheimnis der Spiegelneurone , Bauer explains the mirror neurons system of the brain and its significance on the ability of human to engage in interpersonal relationships, to understand what others do and to experience phenomena such as emotional contagion. He addresses the contrast between aggression and cooperation and the obsolete evolutionary neo-Darwinian views on this topic, and highlights the social role of our biological ability to cooperate.

In Das kooperative Gen. Abschied vom Darwinismus, Bauer presents the recent findings of genetic research and shapes a new view on the possible remodeling of the genomic architecture and the importance of intrinsic, non-random modifications of the genome for the evolution of organisms. Unlike Charles Darwin and the Modern evolutionary synthesis, Bauer considers genetic mutations not only as random changes, but as "communicators and cooperators". In this way, genes help control the "self-transformation" of an organism by making use of transposition elements, also known as 'transposons' in genetics, "which can effect the remodeling of the own genome". Transposons operate according to their intrinsic rules.

In Schmerzgrenze – Vom Ursprung alltäglicher und globaler Gewalt, Bauer summarizes his findings of modern neurobiology on the development of human aggression and violence.
