= Christopher Bramwell =

British actor

Christopher Bramwell is a British actor who was active on television from 1977 until 1996.

He appeared in several TV dramas including Grange Hill, Enemy at the Door, Tales of the Unexpected, The Lion, the Witch and the Wardrobe (in a brief appearance as the adult Peter Pevensie) and Van der Valk. He was also a presenter on Playschool in the early 1980s.

In a non-speaking role, he portrayed the young George Frideric Handel in Tony Palmer's television film God Rot Tunbridge Wells! (1985).

His most recent television appearance was in This Life.
