= Peter Matić =

Austrian actor (1937–2019)

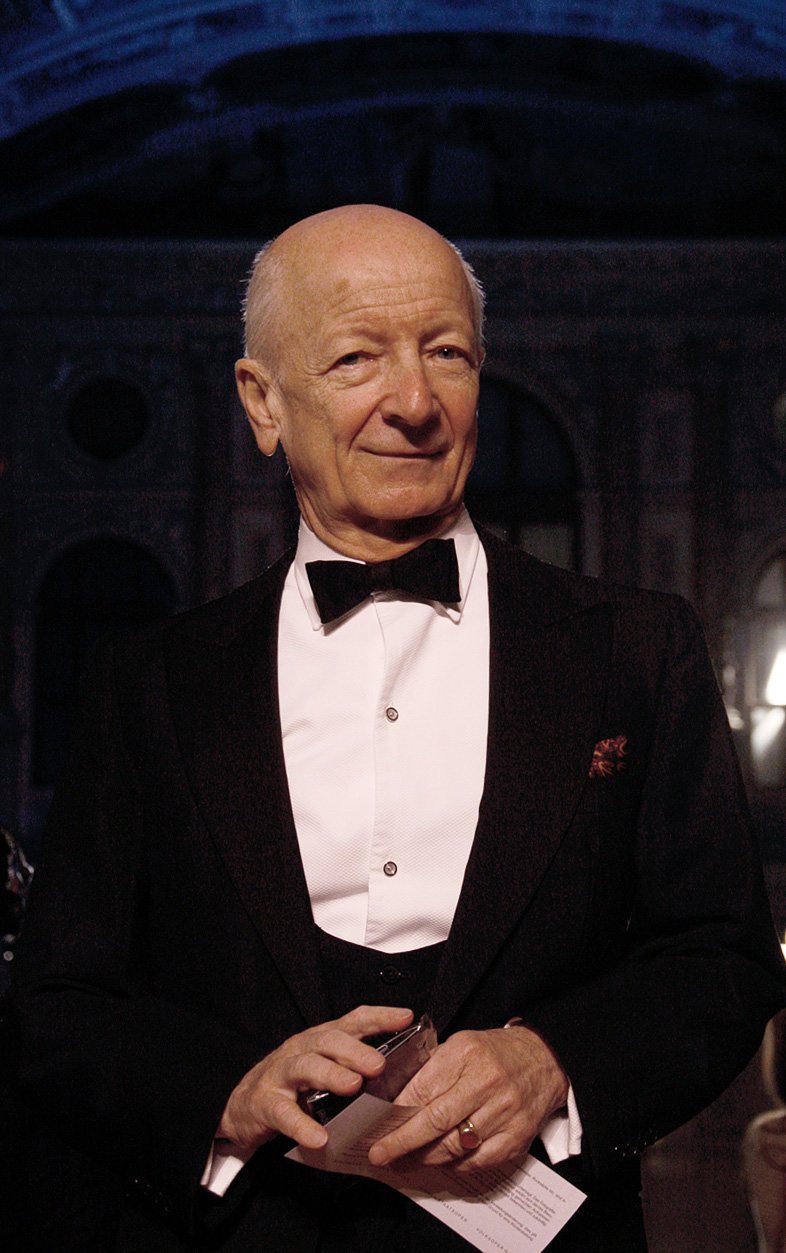
- Peter Matić (2010)
- Born: 24 March 1937; Vienna, Austria
- Died: 20 June 2019 (aged 82); Vienna, Austria
- Occupation: Actor
- Years active: 1961–2019

Peter Matić (24 March 1937 – 20 June 2019) was an Austrian stage, film, television and voice actor. He appeared in more than eighty films from 1961. In German speaking countries he was well known for dubbing the voice of Ben Kingsley.

== Selected filmography ==
Year	Title	Role	Notes
1964	I Learned It from Father		
1976	Everyone Dies Alone		
1986	Wahnfried		
