= List of films using the music of Richard Wagner =

The following is a sortable list of cinema films which have music by Richard Wagner in their soundtracks (other than films of Wagner's operas themselves). Casual references (and use of the Bridal Chorus from Lohengrin) are not included.

== Wagner music in films ==
Film	Year	Director	Music used from:	Ref.
The Birth of a Nation	1915	D. W. Griffith	"Ride of the Valkyries"	
The Viking	1928	Roy William Neill	Parsifal, Flying Dutchman, Die Walküre	
Un Chien Andalou	1929	Luis Buñuel	Tristan und Isolde	
L'Age d'Or	1930	Luis Buñuel	Tristan und Isolde	
Murder!	1930	Alfred Hitchcock	Tristan und Isolde	
City Streets	1931	Rouben Mamoulian	Die Meistersinger von Nürnberg	
A Farewell to Arms	1932	Frank Borzage	Tristan und Isolde	
The Scarlet Empress	1934	Josef von Sternberg	"Ride of the Valkyries"	
R.A.F.	1935	John Betts	"Ride of the Valkyries"	
Triumph of the Will	1935	Leni Riefenstahl	Die Meistersinger von Nürnberg, "Wach' auf" chorus, (act 3, scene 5)	
The Right to Live	1935	William Keighley	Tristan und Isolde	
The Lion Man	1936	John P. McCarthy	"Ride of the Valkyries"	
One Hundred Men and a Girl	1937	Henry Koster	Lohengrin, prelude to act 3	
The Big Broadcast of 1938	1938	Mitchell Leisen	"Ride of the Valkyries (Brunnhilde's Battle Cry)"	
Flash Gordon's Trip to Mars	1938	Frederick Stephani	Parsifal	
Escape	1940	Mervyn LeRoy	Tristan und Isolde ("Liebestod")	
The Great Dictator	1940	Charlie Chaplin	Lohengrin, prelude	
Red River Valley	1941	Joseph Kane	"Ride of the Valkyries", Rienzi	
Sullivan’s Travels	1941	Preston Sturges	"Ride of the Valkyries"	
Secret Mission	1942	Harold French	Die Meistersinger von Nürnberg	
Christmas Holiday	1944	Robert Siodmak	Tristan und Isolde (Liebestod)	
Humoresque	1946	Jean Negulesco	Tristan und Isolde, arranged by Franz Waxman.	
A Foreign Affair	1948	Billy Wilder	Lohengrin, overture	
Unfaithfully Yours	1948	Preston Sturges	Tannhäuser	
The Blue Gardenia	1953	Fritz Lang	"Tristan und Isolde"	
Abismos de pasión	1954	Luis Buñuel	Tristan und Isolde	
Magic Fire	1955	William Dieterle	Ring Cycle	
Love in the Afternoon	1957	Billy Wilder	Tristan und Isolde	
What's Opera, Doc?	1957	Chuck Jones	Ring Cycle, Tannhäuser, The Flying Dutchman	
8½	1963	Federico Fellini	"Ride of the Valkyries"	
Sedmikrásky (Daisies)	1966	Věra Chytilová	Götterdämmerung	
Patriotism	1966	Yukio Mishima	Tristan und Isolde	
The Hawks and the Sparrows	1966	Pier Paolo Pasolini	Siegfried	
Mondo Trasho	1969	John Waters	"Ride of the Valkyries"	
Ludwig: Requiem for a Virgin King	1972	Hans-Jürgen Syberberg	Ring Cycle, Tristan und Isolde, Lohengrin	
Ludwig (film)	1973	Luchino Visconti	Tannhäuser, Tristan und Isolde, Lohengrin	
Lisztomania	1975	Ken Russell	Rienzi, Ring Cycle	
Winifred Wagner und die Geschichte des Hauses Wahnfried 1914–1975	1975	Hans-Jürgen Syberberg	Ring Cycle	
Hitler: A Film from Germany	1977	Hans-Jürgen Syberberg	Ring Cycle	
That Obscure Object of Desire	1977	Luis Buñuel	"Ride of the Valkyries"	
The Boys from Brazil	1978	Franklin Schaffner	Siegfried Idyll	
Seven Beauties	1975	Lina Wertmüller	"Ride of the Valkyries"	
Apocalypse Now	1979	Francis Ford Coppola	"Ride of the Valkyries"	
Nosferatu the Vampyre	1979	Werner Herzog	Das Rheingold	
The Blues Brothers	1980	John Landis	"Ride of the Valkyries"	
Excalibur	1981	John Boorman	Parsifal, Tristan und Isolde, Götterdämmerung	
Wagner	1983	Tony Palmer	Siegfried	
Détective	1985	Jean-Luc Godard	Rienzi	
Come and See	1985	Elem Klimov	Ride of the Valkyries	
The Running Man	1987	Paul Michael Glaser	"Ride of the Valkyries"	
Romeo + Juliet	1996	Baz Luhrmann	Tristan und Isolde (Liebestod)	
Scream (1996 film)	1996	Wes Craven	Ride of the Valkyries	
24 Hour Party People	2002	Michael Winterbottom	"Ride of the Valkyries"	
Birth	2004	Jonathan Glazer	Die Walküre	
Jarhead	2005	Sam Mendes	"Ride of the Valkyries"	
The New World	2006	Terrence Malick	Das Rheingold	
Norbit	2007	Brian Robbins	"Ride of the Valkyries"	
Waitress	2007	Adrienne Shelly	"Ride of the Valkyries"	
Bronson	2008	Nicolas Winding Refn	Götterdämmerung, Das Rheingold	
The Curious Case of Benjamin Button	2008	David Fincher	Tannhäuser, aria "Dich, teure Halle"	
Valkyrie	2008	Bryan Singer	"Ride of the Valkyries"	
Watchmen	2009	Zack Snyder	"Ride of the Valkyries"	
A Dangerous Method	2011	David Cronenberg	Siegfried, Die Walküre	
Melancholia	2011	Lars von Trier	Tristan und Isolde	
Rango	2011	Gore Verbinski	"Ride of the Valkyries"	
To the Wonder	2012	Terrence Malick	Parsifal, prelude	
Nymphomaniac	2013	Lars von Trier	Das Rheingold	
Florence Foster Jenkins	2016	Stephen Frears	"Ride of the Valkyries"	
Alien: Covenant	2017	Ridley Scott	Das Rheingold, Entrance of the Gods into Valhalla	
Promising Young Woman	2020	Emerald Fennell	Tristan und Isolde	
Sonic the Hedgehog	2020	Jeff Fowler	"Ride of the Valkyries"	
Army of the Dead	2021	Zack Snyder	Götterdämmerung	
Wrath of Man	2021	Guy Ritchie	"Ride of the Valkyries"	
Army of Thieves	2021	Matthias Schweighöfer	Götterdämmerung, Das Rheingold, Ride of the Valkyries, Siegfried	
For All Mankind (Season 2 Episode 7)	2021	Ronald D. Moore	"Ride of the Valkyries"	
Tár	2022	Todd Field	Tannhäuser, overture	
The Substance	2024	Coralie Fargeat	Tristan und Isolde	
Maria (2024 film)	2024	Pablo Larraín	Parsifal, prelude	
