= Lyndon Brook =

British actor (1926–2004)

- Born: 10 April 1926; Los Angeles, California, US
- Died: 9 January 2004 (aged 77); London, England
- Occupations: actor, screenwriter
- Years active: 1942–1987
- Spouse: Elizabeth Kentish (m. 1953)
- Children: 2
- Parent(s): Clive Brook (father); Mildred Evelyn (mother)
- Relatives: Faith Brook (sister)

Lyndon Brook (10 April 1926 – 9 January 2004) was a British actor, on film and television.

== Family and early life ==
Lyndon Brook was born on 10 April 1926 in Los Angeles, California, to British parents. He came from an established acting family: his father, Clive Brook, had been a star of the silent movies and had moved to Hollywood to play quintessential Englishmen in a host of films. His parents sent their son back to England to be educated at Stowe School, and he subsequently gained stage experience at Cambridge University. His elder sister, Faith, also became an actress.

== Career ==
In 1949, Brook was given a minor part in the film Train of Events, which starred Valerie Hobson (the future Mrs John Profumo) and John Clements.

In 1951 he was asked by Laurence Olivier to join his company at the St James's Theatre, London, in Shakespeare's Anthony and Cleopatra and George Bernard Shaw's Caesar and Cleopatra. The double production was set up to celebrate the Festival of Britain. It was whilst appearing in these productions that he met his future wife, the actress Elizabeth Kentish.

In 1954 he played an impressionable navigator opposite Gregory Peck in The Purple Plain. The film was set during the Burma campaign and involved a lengthy trek through the jungle. It enjoyed a huge success at the box office. Two years later, Brook co-starred with Kenneth More in one of the most popular of all Second World War dramas, Reach for the Sky.

He appeared with Michael Hordern and Dirk Bogarde in The Spanish Gardener (1956), and as Richard Wagner opposite Bogarde's Franz Liszt in Song Without End (1960).

Thereafter, Brook became a regular in many popular television dramas. He appeared in I, Claudius; three times in The Avengers and The New Avengers; and one appearance in Crown Court (episode "The Getaway", in 1974). He also played George VI alongside Timothy West's Winston Churchill in the BBC's Churchill and the Generals (1979). His later film roles in the 1970s and 1980s included The Hireling, Plenty and Defence of the Realm.

Brook was a much-published author, and scripted the 1957 television series Love Her to Death, which had Peter Wyngarde in the leading role.

== Death ==
Brook died in London on 9 January 2004.

== Filmography ==
Year	Title	Role	Notes
1942	A Yank at Eton	Eton Student	Uncredited
1949	The History of Mr. Polly	Shop Assistant	Uncredited
1949	Trottie True	Bit Role	Uncredited
1949	Train of Events	Actor	Segment: "The Actor"
1954	The Purple Plain	Carrington	
1954	The Passing Stranger	Mike	
1955	Above Us the Waves	Diver Navigator, X2	
1955	One Way Out	Leslie Parrish	
1956	Reach for the Sky	Johnny Sanderson	
1956	The Spanish Gardener	Robert Burton	
1957	The Surgeon's Knife	Dr. Ian Breck	
1958	The Gypsy and the Gentleman	John Patterson	
1958	Innocent Sinners	Charles	
1959	Violent Moment	Douglas Baines	
1960	Song Without End	Richard Wagner	
1960	Surprise Package	Starvin	
1961	Adventure Story	Philotas	
1961	Edgar Wallace Mysteries	Gerry Domford	"Clue of the Silver Key" episode
1962	The Longest Day	Lt. Walsh	Uncredited
1964	The Massingham Affair	Justin Derry	6 episodes
1965	Invasion	Brian Carter	Uncredited
1966	Danger Man	Colin Ashby	1 episode
1967–1968	The Avengers	Dr. Manx/Lyall	2 episodes
1973	The Hireling	Doctor	
1974	Who?	Dr. Barrister	
1975	Edward the Seventh	A.J. Balfour	3 episodes
1976	I, Claudius	Silanus	1 episode
1979	Churchill and the Generals	King George VI	TV movie
1985	Plenty	Begley	
1986	Defence of the Realm	Pugh	
1987	Life Story	Erwin Chargaff	
