= Wahnfried (film) =

1986 film

- Directed by: Peter Patzak
- Written by: Reinhard Baumgart
- Produced by: René Letzgus
- Starring: Otto Sander
- Cinematography: Anton Peschke
- Edited by: Michou Hutter
- Release date: 11 June 1986
- Running time: 112 minutes
- Countries: West Germany; France
- Languages: German; French

Wahnfried (German: Richard und Cosima, French: Richard et Cosima) is a 1986 West German-French drama film directed by Peter Patzak about the life of Richard Wagner. It was screened out of competition at the 1987 Cannes Film Festival.

== Cast ==
- Otto Sander as Richard Wagner
- Tatja Seibt as Cosima Wagner
- Fabienne Babe as Judith Mendès-Gauthier
- Peter Matić as Hans von Bülow
- Anton Diffring as Franz Liszt
- Christoph Waltz as Friedrich Nietzsche
- Anja Jaenicke as Daniela von Bülow
- Luise Prasser as Malwida von Meysenbug
- Carmen Fuggiss as Carrie Pringle
- Arnfried Lerche as Catulle Mendès
- Rudolf Wessely as Schnappauf
- Annette Richter as Blandine von Bülow
- Isabelle Weggler as Isolde von Bülow
- Beate Finckh as Elisabeth Nietzsche
