= Song Without End =

1960 film by Charles Vidor, George Cukor

- VHS cover
- Directed by: Charles Vidor; George Cukor
- Written by: Oscar Millard
- Produced by: William Goetz
- Starring: Dirk Bogarde; Capucine; Geneviève Page
- Cinematography: James Wong Howe
- Edited by: William Lyon
- Music by: Morris Stoloff; Harry Sukman; Franz Liszt
- Distributed by: Columbia Pictures
- Release date: August 11, 1960
- Running time: 141 minutes
- Country: United States
- Language: English
- Budget: $3.5 million
- Box office: $1,500,000 (US and Canada rentals)

Song Without End, subtitled The Story of Franz Liszt, is a 1960 biographical film romance about Franz Liszt made by Columbia Pictures. It was directed by Charles Vidor, who died during the shooting of the film and was replaced by George Cukor. The film stars Dirk Bogarde, Capucine, and Geneviève Page.

== Plot ==
Franz Liszt is living in Chamonix with Countess Marie d'Agoult, the mother of his children, when Frédéric Chopin and George Sand visit him. They tell him about all the things he has missed since he left Paris, and how a new piano virtuoso, Sigismond Thalberg, is captivating audiences. The Countess wants him to remain in seclusion and compose. She views performing as a tawdry occupation.

Liszt cannot stand the lack of an audience and agrees to a recital in Paris, which is a sensation. In the audience is Princess Carolyne Wittgenstein, and Liszt is smitten. He travels to Russia to perform for the Tsar. He resumes his performing career and avoids the Countess while he pursues the married Princess.

Richard Wagner approaches Liszt after a performance with a score for Rienzi. Liszt brushes him off, but when he later hears a rehearsal of the overture, he becomes a champion of his music. He agrees to premiere Lohengrin for Wagner after the composer has to flee an arrest warrant. Liszt is shown conducting the finale of Tannhäuser.

The composer begins an affair with the Princess. She asks her husband for a divorce. After it is granted the couple are happily on the verge of marriage. When the Church discovers the Princess lied about her husband marrying her when she was underage, they prevent her divorce. Liszt wills his estate to his children and retreats to a monastery.

== Cast ==
- Dirk Bogarde as Franz Liszt
- Capucine as Princess Carolyne Wittgenstein
- Geneviève Page as Countess Marie d'Agoult
- Patricia Morison as George Sand
- Ivan Desny as Prince Nicholas
- Martita Hunt as Grand Duchess
- Lou Jacobi as Potin
- Albert Rueprecht as Prince Felix Lichnowsky
- Marcel Dalio as Chelard
- Lyndon Brook as Richard Wagner
- Walter Rilla as Archbishop
- Hans Unterkircher as Tsar
- Erland Erlandsen as Sigismond Thalberg (as E. Erlandsen)
- Alexander Davion as Frédéric Chopin (as Alex Davion)
- Katherine Squire as Anna Liszt

== Production ==
The success in 1945 of Charles Vidor's A Song to Remember about Frédéric Chopin was the germ for a biopic about Franz Liszt. By 1946, Columbia had three spec scripts from musician Theodore Kolline, but serious production did not begin until studio head Harry Cohn announced the project in 1952. The film went through a kind of development hell for the next seven years as the script went from one writer to another and had to be edited extensively to please the censors.

Cohn initially hired his friend Oscar Saul to write the screenplay and William Dieterle to direct. When the studio delayed going forward with the project due to production and casting issues for three years, Saul backed out, and Columbia announced in 1955 that Gottfried Reinhardt had been commissioned to write a new screenplay. In 1958, veteran producer William Goetz took over the project with Oscar Millard as his screenwriter. Charles Vidor was finally assigned to direct using elements of all three screenwriters' scripts. It was continuously revised even as filming was underway.

The movie was the English language debut of Capucine, a protege of Charles Feldman, and very inexperienced.

On June 4, 1959, Charles Vidor died of a heart attack. Bogarde was initially relieved because he thought it meant the film would be cancelled. Everyone had been miserable, particularly Capucine who was acting for the first time. Vidor was extremely harsh towards her and difficult for everyone on set. George Cukor was flown in to finish the production. He set everyone at ease and made major changes to the entire film. He replaced James Wong Howe with Charles Lang, changed the costumes, and even had Anna Lee dub Patricia Morrison's dialogue.

Cukor also abandoned Liszt's famous long hair, opting to make Dirk Bogarde look more like Elvis Presley. Despite the fact that Vidor only shot about 15% of the film, Cukor refused a directing credit.

== Music ==
As nearly 40 musical selections were heard in the film, Morris Stoloff, head of Columbia's music department, began immediate work on the soundtrack. After selecting the pieces to be played, he engaged piano virtuoso Jorge Bolet, the Roger Wagner Chorale, and the Los Angeles Philharmonic to perform the score. Harry Sukman was in charge of the music editing and adaptations that were required of the scores. Musicologist Abram Chasins was a musical consultant on the film.

The piano pieces were recorded before filming so Bogarde could learn the finger movements necessary to make him appear to be realistically playing piano. Bogarde had never played one. Victor Aller coached him for weeks before filming and was present on set to help with miming. Bogarde worked out a code for the keys that made sense only to him and flummoxed Aller. He frequently bled on the piano keys during filming, particularly when he had to mime the virtuosic La Campanella.

Two soundtracks were released for the film. Colpix Records, a division of Columbia Pictures released Song Without End: Original Soundtrack Recording featuring Bolet on piano. In their first soundtrack recording, the Los Angeles Philharmonic Orchestra was conducted by Morris Stoloff. The album include works by Liszt, Paganini, Handel, and Wagner.

Liberty Records released The Franz Liszt Story to showcase the arrangements Harry Sukman made for the film. Sukman plays the piano and leads the orchestra. Liszt's music is given alternative titles on several tracks.

== Reception ==
New York Times critic Bosley Crowther praised the music: “A little bit of everything reflective not only of the talent of Liszt but also of most of the great composers of his highly romantic age—Wagner, Paganini, Beethoven, Verdi, Chopin—artists whose work he respected, assisted, embellished and often played, is packed into this picture. And it is brilliantly and beautifully performed...” However, he observed that “the host of characters were brushed in so superficially that they carry little conviction or emotional strength, and the performances of the actors are, by necessity, more elaborate than they are deep... However, as we say, the music thunders; the settings and costumes are superb—such Viennese concert halls and palaces and lush romantic trappings have never been surpassed in a color film—and, indeed, the sheer posing of the actors by the late Charles Vidor and George Cukor is so suave that anyone moved by musical richness and pictorial splendor should go quite nutty over this film.”

Song Without End has been praised as "among the finest biopics in terms of its musical content" because of its seamless incorporation of classical pieces throughout the film.

== Awards ==
The film won the Best Music score Academy Award for Morris Stoloff and Harry Sukman and the Golden Globe Award for Best Motion Picture (Musical).

Both Bogarde and Capucine were nominated for Golden Globe Awards. Song Without End won Best Film - Musical at the 18th Golden Globe Awards.

== See also ==
- At the Order of the Czar
- Dreams of Love – Liszt
- Dreams of Love (1935 Mexican film)
- Hungarian Rhapsody (1954 film)
- Lisztomania (film)
