= Geliebte Clara =

- French release poster
- Directed by: Helma Sanders-Brahms
- Written by: Helma Sanders-Brahms; Nicole-Lise Bernheim; Colo Tavernier O'Hagan
- Produced by: Alfred Huermer
- Starring: Martina Gedeck; Pascal Greggory; Malik Zidi
- Cinematography: Jürgen Jürges
- Edited by: Isabelle Devinck
- Music by: Johannes Brahms; Clara Schumann; Robert Schumann
- Distributed by: Bodega Films (France); Kinowelt (Germany)
- Release dates: 31 October 2008 (Deutsche Filmfestival in Tokyo); 4 December 2008 (Germany); 13 May 2009 (France)
- Running time: 107 minutes
- Countries: Germany; France; Hungary
- Language: German

Geliebte Clara ("Beloved Clara") is a Franco-German-Hungarian 2008 film, directed by Helma Sanders-Brahms, her last film before her 2014 death, about the pianist Clara Schumann and her marriage with the composer Robert Schumann.

== Plot ==
After a performance of Robert Schumann's Piano Concerto in A minor in Hamburg, where the couple get to know the young composer Johannes Brahms, Clara and Robert Schumann take up residence in their new home in Düsseldorf, where Robert begins his new job as musical director. The demands of composition of his new symphony, the Rhenish Symphony, leads to tension between him and Clara.

A little later Brahms introduces a couple of his own compositions to the Schumanns and they are impressed by his compositional and pianistic skills. Allowing him to stay with them, Brahms lovingly cares for their children. Robert's work on the Rhenish Symphony continues to suffer, and he struggles with an addiction to the drug laudanum, on which he is soon dependent. There is further tension between him and his wife, who is expecting another child. Shortly after the successful premiere of the Rhenish Symphony, Schumann becomes acquainted with Dr. Richartz who offers him help with his health problems.

Schumann sees the talented Brahms as his successor, but Brahms leaves the Schumann household when he realizes that he feels more than just friendship for Clara. Additionally the Schumanns are troubled with financial problems.

Robert tries in vain to take his own life, by jumping into the River Rhine, but accepts the offer of Dr. Richartz to be a patient at his sanatorium at Endenich in Bonn. Brahms returns to help Clara to care for children. The two tour together to raise money for the family, while Robert is a patient at the institute. Eventually Clara and Brahms travel to Bonn, to say a final farewell.

After Robert's death, Brahms and Clara realise that their relationship can never be truly fulfilled, but Brahms celebrates another success with the premiere of his First Piano Concerto, with Clara as soloist.

== Cast ==
- Martina Gedeck: Clara Schumann
- Pascal Greggory: Robert Schumann
- Malik Zidi: Johannes Brahms
- Aline Annessy: Elise Schumann
- Brigitte Annessy: Bertha
- Marine Annessy: Eugenie Schumann
- Sascha Caparros: Ludwig Schumann
- Clara Eichinger: Marie Schumann
- Béla Fesztbaum: exchange
- Christine Oesterlein: Henriette
- Péter Takátsy: Wazielewski
- Walter Theil: Dr. Richartz

== Critical reception ==
The Encyclopedia of International Film said: "The film suffers not only to its static camera, but especially on the miscast of Robert Schumann. Despite the usual quiet and nuanced acting actress to convey feelings so neither understandable nor noise, nor life force."
