= Song of Love (1947 film) =

1947 film by Clarence Brown

- Directed by: Clarence Brown
- Screenplay by: Ivan Tors; Irmgard von Cube; Allen Vincent; Robert Ardrey
- Based on: Song of Love, the Life of Robert and Clara Schumann play by Bernard Schubert; Mario Silva
- Produced by: Clarence Brown
- Starring: Katharine Hepburn; Paul Henreid; Robert Walker; Leo G. Carroll; Henry Daniell; Henry Stephenson
- Cinematography: Harry Stradling Sr.
- Edited by: Robert Kern
- Music by: Robert Schumann; Johannes Brahms; Franz Liszt
- Production company: Metro-Goldwyn-Mayer
- Distributed by: Loew's Inc.
- Release date: October 9, 1947
- Running time: 119 minutes
- Country: United States
- Language: English
- Budget: $2,696,000
- Box office: $2,737,000

Song of Love is a 1947 American biopic film about the relationship between renowned 19th-century musicians Clara Wieck Schumann (Katharine Hepburn) and Robert Schumann (Paul Henreid). The film, which also stars Robert Walker and Leo G. Carroll, was directed by Clarence Brown and released by Metro-Goldwyn-Mayer. Ivan Tors, Irma von Cube, Allen Vincent, and Robert Ardrey co-authored the screenplay, which was based on a play by Bernard Schubert and Mario Silva.

== Plot ==
In this story of Clara and Robert Schumann, of Johannes Brahms and Franz Liszt, certain necessary liberties have been taken with incident and chronology. The basic story of their lives remains a true and shining chapter in the history of music.

— Opening caption

At the Royal Opera, Dresden on May 10th, 1839, mademoiselle Clara Wieck gives a pianoforte command performance, including Franz Liszt's composition, in the name of His Majesty Augustus Fredericus II, King of Saxony, with Liszt in attendance. Her father, Professor Wieck, suggests she encore with La campanella, but she instead announces Träumerei (Dreaming), the work of a new composer, Robert Schumann, who's in the audience. She receives many "Bravo!" praises, despite her father's displeasure. "I did it for Robert...because I love him." Young Prince Albert calls her "wonderful."

Professor Wieck and Robert argue about marriage forcing Clara to argue her case before a Leipzig Judge, who sides with her father until Liszt begs to be heard, eliciting laughter from spectators, at whom the bailiff demands, "Silence!" Liszt argues that Schumann is not the failure that Prof. Wieck claims. Robert and Clara are wed, moving into a small apartment where he plays Widmung (Dedication) to express his love. Clara takes a break from her thriving career as an acclaimed concert pianist to devote herself to Robert and their children.

Years later, Johannes Brahms visits Professor Schumann in his large new home, successful after having published works each year from 1840 to 1849. Johannes protects baby Felix from Marie, Elise, Julie, Ludwig, Ferdinand and Eugenie who are chasing a chicken for Bertha to prepare dinner. Wanting to study with Robert, Johannes demonstrates, playing one of his rhapsodies, intriguing Clara and Robert both; Robert invites Johannes to live with them during his studies. During their New Years Eve party, Johannes plays a piece but Robert hears a constant ringing tone, wondering what's "wrong with the piano...?"

For weeks, Schumann struggles with chronic headaches while teaching and working on Scenes from Goethe's Faust, and resents that the agent Mr. Haslinger contracted Clara to perform a concert in Cologne to pay the bills. She encourages him that she plays only for the present, whereas his compositions "will last forever." But Robert disparages, it will be "music to which no man will listen." Julie contracts measles; after asking "Uncle Brahms" if he loves her mommy, he plays her a lullaby.

Dr. Hoffman checks on Robert, who is composing Verrufene Stelle (The Cursed Forest) and complains about "the 'A'...in my own head...The A, A, A, A!" Hoffman advises, "ease up" on the work, prescribing sedatives for melancholia. Clara explains, "His sister's mind broke down. She killed herself." They hope Robert's opera might revive him, but she finds Härtel's rejection letter. For help, Brahms seeks out Liszt, who asks Princess Valerie Hohenfels to "ensnare...for a good purpose," Mr. Reinecke, "the greatest living conductor." At the soiree, Listz performs a composition, and then introduces his "pyrotechnic" paraphrased arrangement of Schumann's Dedication. But Clara plays it again, as it was intended, "No illusions. No storms at sea. No gild. No glitter...Just love. Unadorned." Listz asks Reinecke to consider Schumann's "newest work...for the Gewandhaus."

While Robert plays Arabesque, Brahms packs, telling Clara he loves her but, he "can't live here anymore." Robert too realizes Johannes loves Clara. Brahms moves out. Robert completes his opera, but as he conducts a performance, the "A" tone headache becomes overwhelming, forcing him to stop mid-concert. Months after his mental breakdown and attempted suicide for being unable to cope with disappointment and failure, Clara visits the asylum where Robert eventually dies.

This was Clara's decision. And so, through the years, in villages and great cities, she played Schumann's music – until the world came to know and forever remember the glory of his genius.

— Interlude caption

Four years later, Brahms returns on his way to Cologne to hear his latest composition performed, inviting Clara, who still mourns, dressed in black. He encourages her to start playing again and get out of her empty house. They leave the concert for dinner and dancing, where Johannes proposes marriage. But Clara rejects him, "I could never stop loving [Robert]...He still lives...I could help him to live forever." She devotes her remaining life to play, promote and preserve Robert's music and memory.

On May 10th 1890 at the Royal Opera, Dresden, Clara makes a farewell appearance, performing a memorial concert of Robert's work. With King Albert in attendance, she plays Träumerei once more.

== Cast ==
- Katharine Hepburn as Clara Wieck Schumann
- Paul Henreid as Robert Schumann
- Robert Walker as Johannes Brahms
- Else Janssen^{[fr]} as Bertha
- Henry Daniell as Franz Liszt
- Leo G. Carroll as Professor Wieck
- Roman Bohnen as Dr. Hoffman
- Ludwig Stössel as Haslinger
- Tala Birell as Princess Valerie Hohenfels
- Kurt Katch as Judge
- Henry Stephenson as King Albert
  - Larry Simms as young Prince Albert (uncredited)
- Gigi Perreau as Julie
- Ann Carter as Marie
- Jimmie Hunt as Ludwig
- Anthony Sydes as Ferdinand
- Eilene Janssen as Elise
- Konstantin Shayne as Reinecke
- Byron Foulger as Bailiff (uncredited)

== Production notes ==
Hepburn trained with a pianist for weeks prior to production so she could be filmed playing the piano convincingly. When Henreid is playing piano, the hands of Ervin Nyiregyházi are seen. The soundtrack for the picture was recorded by Arthur Rubinstein. Rubinstein said Hepburn played almost as well as he.

== Reception ==
The film earned $1,469,000 in the U.S. and Canada and $1,268,000 elsewhere resulting in a loss of $1,091,000.

Variety listed the film as earning $3.1 million in U.S. and Canadian rentals in 1947.
