= Heavenly Music =

1943 film

- Directed by: Josef Berne
- Written by: Reginald LeBorg; Edward James; Paul Gerard Smith; Michael L. Simmons
- Produced by: Jerry Bresler; Sam Coslow
- Starring: Fred Brady; Mary Elliott
- Cinematography: Robert Surtees
- Edited by: Albert Akst
- Distributed by: MGM
- Release date: May 1, 1943
- Running time: 22 minutes
- Country: United States
- Language: English

Heavenly Music is a 1943 American musical short fantasy film directed by Josef Berne. It won an Oscar at the 16th Academy Awards in 1944 for Best Short Subject (Two-Reel).

== Plot ==
Ted Barry, a jazz band leader and songwriter, has just died and is entering heaven. He is not recognized by St. Peter and has no references. He sings one of his hit songs and an angel, Joy, recognizes him from her time on earth. Barry wants to be admitted into the Hall of Music, made up of famous classical composers such as Beethoven, Tchaikovsky, Brahms, Wagner, Bach, and others. The composers have never heard of the boogie-woogie or dixieland styles of music that Barry is known for, so he must audition for them. His audition melody has been borrowed from the Nutcracker Suite, and Tchaikovsky recognizes it and becomes angered. Barry points out that the same theme was also stolen from Wagner and Brahms, proving that he has a good knowledge of the classics.

Beethoven says that Barry must also prove that he has musical ability, giving him ten minutes to compose an original song. In frustration, Barry is going to quit, but Joy helps him write a song by becoming his muse. He writes and performs the song for the committee, but is denied and told he should return in 200 years to see if his music can stand the test of time. Joy speaks on his behalf, saying that his melody is beautiful, and could be played in any style. She asks several composers to play the melody in the individual classical and romantic styles of Chopin, Liszt, Rimsky-Korsakov, Strauss, and Beethoven. The committee decides to accept Barry into the Hall of Music and they all play his song together in a jazz style, and Gabriel enters playing jazz trumpet.

== Cast ==
- Fred Brady as Ted Barry
- Mary Elliott as Joy, an angel
- Eric Blore as Mr. Frisbie
- Steven Geray as Ludwig van Beethoven
- Fritz Feld as Niccolò Paganini (uncredited)
- Elmer Jerome as Official Recorder (uncredited)
- Lionel Royce as Pyotr Tchaikovsky (uncredited)
- Billie "Buckwheat" Thomas as Gabriel (uncredited)
- Halliwell Hobbes as Franz Liszt (uncredited)
- Eric Mayne as Johannes Brahms (uncredited)
- William Yetter Sr. as Richard Wagner (uncredited)
