= David Katz (psychologist) =

Swedish psychologist (1884–1953)

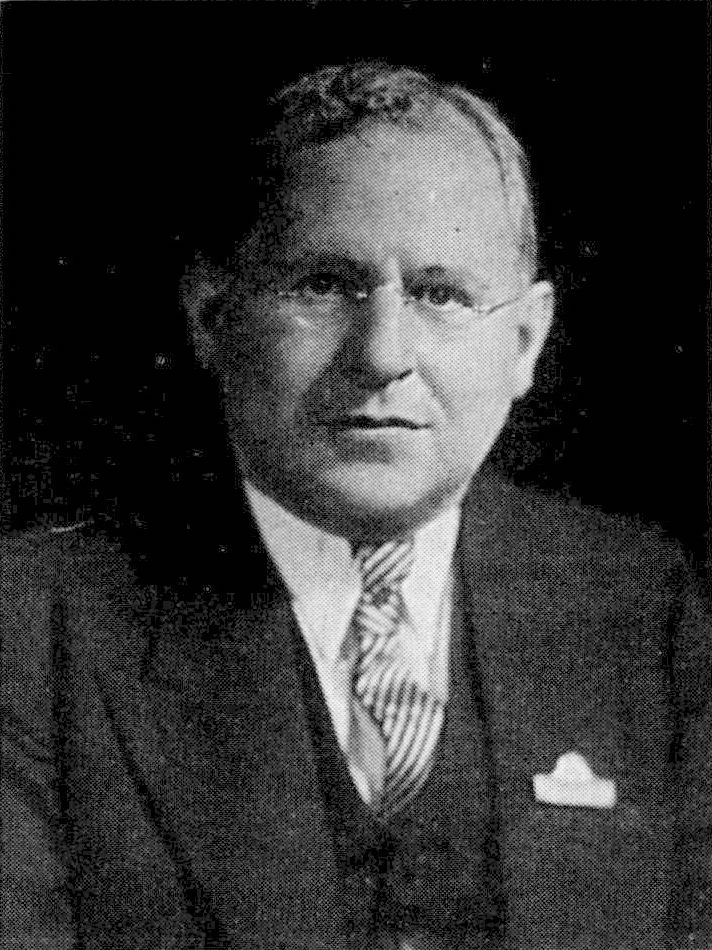
- Born: 1 October 1884; Kassel, German Empire
- Died: 2 February 1953 (aged 68); Stockholm, Sweden
- Scientific career
- Fields: Gestalt psychology, phenomenology

David Katz (1 October 1884 – 2 February 1953) was a German-born Swedish psychologist and educator who specialized in Gestalt psychology and phenomenology. He was a professor Emeritus at the Stockholm University. Prior to the establishment of the Nazi regime in Germany, he served as the chair of psychology and education at the State University of Mecklenburg in Rostock.

== Academic career ==
Katz obtained his doctoral degree from the university of Göttingen in 1906. Katz became the chair of psychology and education at the State University of Mecklenburg in Rostock, Germany in 1919. In 1933, his position was removed when the National Socialist Party took over and he had to leave the country. Katz traveled from Germany to England, where he joined T.H. Pear's laboratory in Manchester, Here, he investigated the role of the tongue as a sensory organ. In 1937, Katz became a professor at the Stockholm University, where he began to focus on gestalt principles until his retirement in 1952.

== Research ==
Katz is known for his research in the field of Gestalt psychology and phenomenology, however his interests lay in a variety of fields. In 1918, his work focused on the psychological effects of amputation and the phenomenon of the phantom limb. In England, Katz studied the tongue with T.H Pear and then later began research on the feeding habits of monkeys under poor light conditions with Julian Huxley in 1935. He also investigated subjects like appetite, perceptual constancy, color, kinesthesis, touch, vibratory sense, and musical perception.

== Works ==
- The world of touch, 1925
- Hunger und Appetit, 1932
- The world of colour, 1935
- Conversations with children, 1936
- Animals and men, 1937
- Gestaltpsychologie, 1944
- Psychologischer Atlas, 1945
