= A Song to Remember =

1945 film by Charles Vidor

- Film poster
- Directed by: Charles Vidor
- Screenplay by: Sidney Buchman
- Story by: Ernst Marischka
- Produced by: Louis F. Edelman
- Starring: Paul Muni; Merle Oberon; Cornel Wilde
- Cinematography: Tony Gaudio; Allen M. Davey
- Edited by: Charles Nelson
- Music by: Miklós Rózsa
- Color process: Technicolor
- Production company: Columbia Pictures
- Distributed by: Columbia Pictures
- Release date: January 18, 1945
- Running time: 112 minutes
- Country: United States
- Language: English
- Budget: $0.5-$2 million
- Box office: $7 million

A Song to Remember is a 1945 American biographical film which tells a fictionalised life story of Polish pianist and composer Frédéric Chopin. Directed by Charles Vidor and starring Paul Muni, Merle Oberon, and Cornel Wilde.

== Plot ==
Frederic Chopin, a talented young pianist and composer, captivates his teacher Professor Józef Elsner with his extraordinary skills at the age of 11. Elsner receives an invitation from the renowned music publisher Louis Pleyel to bring Chopin to Paris, hoping to replicate the success of Franz Liszt. However, Chopin's father cannot afford the expenses. While discussing the future, Chopin's attention is diverted by the plight of Polish people being taken prisoners by the Russian authorities. He becomes determined to fight for Poland's freedom. Amidst his secret political activities, Chopin continues his musical journey with the support of Elsner, who is still determined to see him succeed in Paris.

Chopin is invited to perform at Count Wyszynka's banquet, but he discovers that the Russian Governor of Poland is among the guests. Outraged, Chopin refuses to play for the oppressors and storms out. His friends warn him of the impending danger, urging him to flee to Paris. With Elsner's help, Chopin finally arrives in Paris, where they meet Pleyel, who initially dismisses them until he hears Chopin's Polonaise. Impressed, Pleyel promises to arrange a concert for Chopin.

The professor takes Chopin to Café de la Bohème, where they encounter famous personalities such as Liszt, Victor Hugo, Alexandre Dumas, and Honoré de Balzac. Despite a turbulent encounter with a critic, Friedrich Kalkbrenner, Chopin is introduced to Liszt, who introduces him to George Sand, a writer known for her masculine attire. The night before Chopin's crucial debut, a letter arrives bearing tragic news of his friends' arrests and deaths in Poland. Overwhelmed by grief, Chopin performs the first bars of his Heroic Polonaise during his concert and abruptly leaves the stage. The reviews are harsh, except for one written by George Sand, who praises Chopin as a genius.

Sand invites Chopin and Elsner to a reception hosted by the Duchess of Orléans, where Chopin's talent is acknowledged by Liszt and the attendees. Pleyel expresses interest in promoting Chopin's music and arranges a meeting for the following day. However, Chopin chooses to spend time with Sand instead, reveling in their success. Sand convinces Chopin to stay with her in Mallorca, where he can focus solely on composition. While Sand supports Chopin's fame, her insistence on keeping him away from the concert stage prolongs his life as he battles tuberculosis.

Back in Paris, Pleyel eagerly awaits Chopin's return to arrange concerts and publish his music. Meanwhile, Elsner faces financial struggles and returns to teaching. The professor learns from Liszt that Chopin occasionally performs at salons and secures invitations for Elsner. With news of Poland's crushed uprising and the plight of their imprisoned comrades, Constantia, a friend of Chopin's, implores him to rally support or gather funds to aid the cause. Initially disengaged, Chopin's sense of patriotism is awakened when Constantia brings him Polish earth.

Chopin reunites with Elsner and ends his relationship with Sand to embark on an international tour to raise money for Poland, fully aware that it will further deteriorate his health. His illness worsens, and during a passionate performance, blood stains the keys. Eventually, the strain of the tour takes its toll, and Chopin's health deteriorates further. On his deathbed, he longs to see Sand one last time, but she, posing for Delacroix, refuses to visit. Chopin dies with Kalkbrenner, Pleyel, Elsner, and Constantia by his side, while Liszt plays the piano in the adjacent room.

== Cast ==
- Paul Muni as Professor Józef Elsner
- Merle Oberon as George Sand
- Cornel Wilde as Frédéric Chopin
- Nina Foch as Constantia
- George Coulouris as Louis Pleyel
- Howard Freeman as Friedrich Kalkbrenner
- Stephen Bekassy as Franz Liszt
- Roxy Roth as Niccolò Paganini

== Reception ==
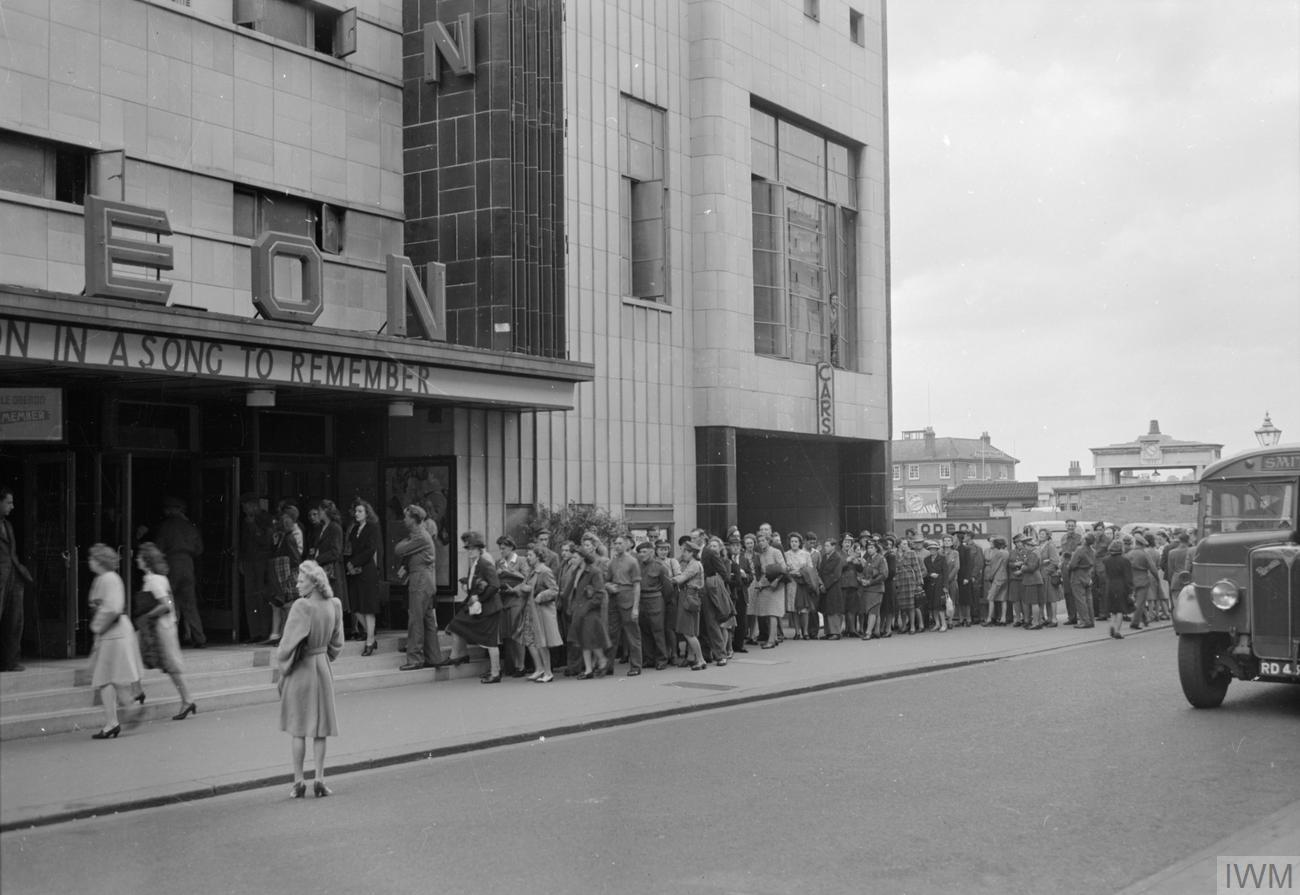
Moviegoers queuing for tickets to see A Song to Remember in Reading, England (1945)

A Song to Remember was nominated for several Academy Awards: Best Actor in a Leading Role (Cornel Wilde), Best Cinematography, Color, Best Film Editing, Best Music, Scoring of a Dramatic or Comedy Picture, Best Sound, Recording (John P. Livadary), and Best Writing, Original Story.

Though Chopin was a true Polish patriot, Vidor highly romanticizes Chopin's patriotism in the film, which was produced during World War II. He fictionalizes Chopin's relationship with Elsner (who did not really accompany him to Paris) and greatly distorts Chopin's relationship with Sand to produce a "good vs. evil" struggle for Chopin's soul between Elsner and Sand. The script occasionally sounds more like propaganda for wartime self-sacrifice over individualism than like the real story of Chopin's life.

Ayn Rand was sharply critical of the film, strongly taking the side of the George Sand character as against the Polish nationalist ones – a value judgment diametrically opposite to that taken by the film makers: "George Sand, according to the film, is evil because she provides a beautiful, private retreat where Chopin can live in peace and luxury, because she takes care of his every need, attends to his health, and urges him to forget the world and devote himself exclusively to the work of writing music, which he is desperately eager to do. The young Polish girl, according to the film, is good because she urges Chopin to drop the work that he loves and go out on a concert tour to collect money 'for the people', for a cause that is identified as national or revolutionary or both, and this is supposed to justify everything – so she demands that Chopin renounce his genius, sacrifice his composing and go out to entertain paying audiences – even though he hates concert playing, is ill with tuberculosis and has been warned by the doctors that the strain of a tour will kill him".

Victor Brown noted that "The breakup of George Sand's relationship with Chopin was for personal reasons completely different from those shown in the film – mainly Chopin's siding with Sand's estranged daughter against her mother. In fact, George Sand was an outspoken supporter of the Polish national cause in her own right, an allegiance which lasted long past the end of the relationship with Chopin. During the Revolution of 1848 in France, George Sand took part in a Polish solidarity demonstration held in Paris on May 15, 1848, calling for the French Army to be sent to liberate Poland".

The pianist José Iturbi played the piano music, and also orchestrated part of the B minor Sonata for the scene when Chopin and George Sand arrive in Mallorca. The hands of pianist Ervin Nyiregyházi are shown playing the piano.

== Legacy ==
Liberace's trademark candelabrum was inspired by a similar prop in A Song to Remember.
