= Lists of films =

This is a list of film lists.

== By title ==
Alphabetically indexed lists of films
A	B	C	D	E	F	G	H	I
J	K	L	M	N	O	P	Q	R
S	T	U	V	W	X	Y	Z	0–9

This is an alphabetical list of film articles (or sections within articles about films). It includes made for television films. See the talk page in A for the method of indexing used.

== By year ==
Lists of film related events indexed by year of release.

1870s
1870
1871
1872
1873
1874
1875
1876
1877
1878
1879

1880s
1880
1881
1882
1883
1884
1885
1886
1887
1888
1889

1890s
1890
1891
1892
1893
1894
1895
1896
1897
1898
1899

1900s
1900
1901
1902
1903
1904
1905
1906
1907
1908
1909

1910s
1910
1911
1912
1913
1914
1915
1916
1917
1918
1919

1920s
1920
1921
1922
1923
1924
1925
1926
1927
1928
1929

1930s
1930
1931
1932
1933
1934
1935
1936
1937
1938
1939

1940s
1940
1941
1942
1943
1944
1945
1946
1947
1948
1949

1950s
1950
1951
1952
1953
1954
1955
1956
1957
1958
1959

1960s
1960
1961
1962
1963
1964
1965
1966
1967
1968
1969

1970s
1970
1971
1972
1973
1974
1975
1976
1977
1978
1979

1980s
1980
1981
1982
1983
1984
1985
1986
1987
1988
1989

1990s
1990
1991
1992
1993
1994
1995
1996
1997
1998
1999

2000s
2000
2001
2002
2003
2004
2005
2006
2007
2008
2009

2010s
2010
2011
2012
2013
2014
2015
2016
2017
2018
2019

2020s
2020
2021
2022
2023
2024
2025
2026
2027
2028
2029

== By country ==
- Lists of American films
- Lists of Argentine films
- Lists of Australian films
- List of Austrian films
- List of Azerbaijani films
- List of Bangladeshi films
- List of Belgian films
- Lists of Brazilian films
- List of British films
- List of Bulgarian films
- Lists of Canadian films
- List of Chinese films
- List of Czech and Slovak films
- List of Czech films
- List of Danish films
- List of Dutch films
- List of Estonian films
- Lists of Egyptian films
- List of Finnish films
- List of French films
- List of Georgian films
- List of German films
- List of Hong Kong films
- List of Hungarian films
- Lists of Indian films
- List of Iranian films
- List of Israeli films
- List of Italian films
- List of Japanese films
- List of Korean films
- List of Malaysian films
- List of Maldivian films
- Lists of Mexican films
- List of Norwegian films
- List of Pakistani films
- List of Philippine films
- List of Polish films
- List of Portuguese films
- List of Singaporean films
- List of South Korean films
- List of Soviet films
- List of Spanish films
- List of Sri Lankan films
- List of Swedish films
- List of Turkish films

== By source ==
=== Actual ===
- Lists of films based on actual events
- List of non-fiction works made into feature films

=== Traditional: Religion and folklore ===
- List of films based on the Bible
- List of films based on Germanic mythology
- List of films based on classical mythology
- List of films based on Slavic mythology
- List of films and television series featuring Robin Hood
- List of films based on the Bible

=== Classical ===
- List of films based on Greek drama
  - List of films based on Romeo and Juliet

=== Fictional ===
- List of fiction works made into feature films
  - List of short fiction made into feature films
  - List of films based on western fiction

=== Literature ===
- Lists of films based on books
  - List of films based on arts books
  - List of children's books made into feature films
  - List of films based on civics books
  - List of films based on film books
  - List of films based on sports books
- List of films based on poems
- List of National Lampoon films

=== Comics ===
- List of comic-based films directed by women
- List of films based on comic strips
- List of films based on English-language comics
  - List of films based on DC Comics publications
  - List of films based on Marvel Comics publications
  - List of films based on Archie Comics
  - List of films based on Dark Horse Comics
  - List of films based on Harvey Comics
  - List of films based on Image Comics
- List of films based on comics
  - List of films based on French-language comics
  - List of films based on manga

=== Entertainments ===
- List of films based on operas
- List of films based on radio series
- List of films based on toys
- List of films based on video games
  - List of short films based on video games
- Lists of plays adapted into feature films

== By genre ==
=== Plot form ===
- List of biographical films
- List of children's films
- List of melodrama films
- List of satirical films

=== Product form ===
- Lists of 3D films
  - List of 3D films (1914–2004)
  - List of 3D films (2005–present)
  - List of films made with Autodesk 3ds Max
- List of 4DX motion-enhanced films
  - List of ScreenX formatted films
- List of 70 mm films
- Lists of animated films
  - List of children's animated films
  - List of computer-animated films
  - List of films with live action and animation
  - List of puppet films
  - List of stop motion films
- List of avant-garde films
- List of docufiction films
- List of early color feature films
- List of early wide-gauge films
- List of IMAX films
- List of non-narrative films
- List of nonlinear narrative films
- List of three-strip Technicolor films
- List of Technirama films
- List of Techniscope films
- List of VistaVision films

== By topic ==
=== Historical ===
- Lists of historical films
- List of Christian films
- List of composers depicted on film
  - List of films about Richard Wagner
- List of films about the Romanovs
- List of films about the Titanic
- List of ninja films
- List of pirate films
- List of Western films by year
  - List of Euro-Western films
  - List of Spaghetti Western films

=== National ===
- List of documentary films about China
- List of Films about the Kibbutz
- List of films about Krishna
- List of films about martial law under Ferdinand Marcos
- List of films about the Romanian Revolution
- List of films about socialism
- List of Islam-related films
  - List of films about Muhammad

=== Cultural ===
- List of biker films
- List of films about bands
- List of films about blues music
- List of films about cooking
- List of films about food and drink
- List of films about mathematicians
- List of films about philosophers
- List of films about pianists
- List of films with plots centered on video games
- List of films related to the hippie subculture
- List of punk films
- List of visual anthropology films

=== Social ===
- List of blaxploitation films
- List of films about the Rwandan genocide
- List of films about women's issues
- List of films that depict class struggle
- List of interracial romance films
- List of skinhead films
- List of trial films

=== Supernatural ===
- List of films about angels
- List of films about demons
- Lists of superhero films

=== Other ===
- List of environmental films
- List of films about automobiles
- List of films about horses
- List of films about mental disorders
- List of films about Wikipedia

== By cost ==
- List of films using the music of Richard Wagner
- List of films with high frame rates
- List of films with longest production time
- List of films with overtures
- List of most expensive films
  - List of most expensive non-English-language films
  - List of most expensive Indian films

== By length ==
=== Long ===
- List of films split into multiple parts
- List of longest films
  - List of longest animated films
  - List of longest films in India

=== Short ===
- List of animated short films
  - List of theatrical animated short film series
  - List of Looney Tunes feature films
  - List of short film series

== By location ==
- Lists of films set around holidays
- List of films set in the future
- List of films set within one day
- List of one-location films

== By production company ==
=== Cast or crew ===
- List of films cut over the director's opposition
- List of film director and actor collaborations
- List of film director and cinematographer collaborations
- List of Warren Miller films

=== Studio ===
- Lists of films by studio

== By copyright status ==
- List of animated films in the public domain in the United States
- List of films in the public domain in the United States

== By availability ==
- List of abandoned and unfinished films
- List of incomplete or partially lost films
- List of rediscovered films
- List of rediscovered film footage

== By release style ==
=== Series, remakes and spin-offs ===
- List of English-language films with previous foreign-language film versions
- Lists of feature film series
  - List of films produced back-to-back
  - Lists of films with post-credit scenes
    - List of films with post-credits scenes (before 2000)
    - List of films with post-credits scenes (2000s)
    - List of films with post-credits scenes (2010s)
    - List of films with post-credits scenes (2020s)
- List of fictional shared universes in film
- List of remakes and adaptations of Disney animated films
- Lists of film remakes
  - List of film remakes (A–M)
  - List of film remakes (N–Z)
- List of films based on television programs
- List of television programs based on films

=== Home viewing or roadshow ===
- List of Disney Channel original films
- List of Disney television films
- List of Hallmark Channel Original Movies
- List of Independent Lens films
- List of made-for-television films with LGBT characters
- List of NBC Saturday Night at the Movies titles
- List of The Naked Brothers Band films
- List of science fiction television films
- List of television films produced for American Broadcasting Company
- List of television films produced for UPN

=== Containing mature content ===
- List of films that most frequently use the word fuck
- List of Hong Kong Category III films
- List of Japanese sexploitation films
- List of NC-17 rated films

== By response ==
=== Critical or popular selection ===
- List of films considered the best
- List of films considered the worst
- List of films shown at Butt-Numb-A-Thon
- List of films shown at the New York Film Festival
- List of Sundance Film Festival selections
- List of film spoofs in Mad
- List of films with a 100% rating on Rotten Tomatoes
- List of films with a 0% rating on Rotten Tomatoes

=== Adaptation and cult ===
- List of cult films
- List of television programs based on films
- List of films adapted into novels
- List of comics based on films
- List of songs based on a film
- List of video games based on films

== By revenue ==
- List of fastest-grossing films
- List of highest-grossing films
  - List of film sequels by box-office improvement
- Lists of box office number-one films
  - List of films with the most weekends at number one

== By feature ==
- List of films featuring claymation
- List of films featuring colonialism
- List of films featuring diabetes
- List of films featuring dinosaurs
- List of films featuring domestic violence
- List of films featuring drones
- List of films featuring eclipses
- List of films featuring extraterrestrials
- List of films featuring fictional films
- List of films featuring flying cars
- List of films featuring Frankenstein's monster
- List of films featuring gay bathhouses
- List of films featuring giant monsters
- List of films featuring hallucinogens
- List of films featuring Hercules
- List of films featuring home invasions
- List of films featuring insects
- List of films featuring miniature people
- List of films featuring powered exoskeletons
- List of films featuring psychopaths and sociopaths
- List of films featuring slavery
- List of films featuring space stations
- List of films featuring surveillance
- List of films featuring the deaf and hard of hearing
- List of films featuring the French Foreign Legion
- List of films featuring the Irish Republican Army
- List of films featuring the Salvation Army
- List of films featuring the United States Marine Corps
- List of films featuring the United States Navy SEALs
- List of films featuring time loops
- List of films featuring unemployment
- List of films featuring Wing Chun

== Other ==
- Lists of animated feature films released theatrically in the United States
  - List of animated feature films released theatrically in the United States (1937–1999)
  - List of animated feature films released theatrically in the United States (2000–2019)
  - List of animated feature films released theatrically in the United States (2020–present)

== See also ==
- Lists of television programs
- Lists of books
- Lists of comics
- Lists of libraries
