= 2000s in film =

The decade of the 2000s in film involved many significant developments in the filmmaking industries around the world, especially in the technologies used. Building on advancements from the 1990s, computers were widely utilized to create effects that would have previously been more expensive and time-consuming, from the subtle erasing of surrounding islands in Cast Away to the vast battle scenes in The Matrix sequels.

== Trends ==
- The 2000s saw the resurgence of several genres. Fantasy film franchises dominated the box office with The Lord of the Rings, Harry Potter, Pirates of the Caribbean, the Star Wars prequel trilogy (beginning in 1999), The Chronicles of Narnia, etc. Comic book superhero films became a blockbuster subgenre following the releases of X-Men, Unbreakable, and Spider-Man; culminating in the unprecedented achievements of The Dark Knight in both revenue and acclaim. Gladiator sparked the revival of historical epics set in ancient times (e.g., 300), and the Bollywood-inspired Moulin Rouge! did the same for live action musical films in the Western world (e.g., Chicago). Hong Kong fight choreographers like Yuen Woo-ping continued their influence in Hollywood with such martial arts films as Kill Bill: Volume 1 and Kill Bill: Volume 2, even leading to the spread of wire fu into other subgenres alongside filmmaker John Woo's gun fu from the likes of Mission: Impossible 2.
- Certain film categories that were generally not popular in North America became more attractive to western moviegoers. Subtitled non-English language films such as Crouching Tiger, Hidden Dragon, Amélie, Hero, The Passion of the Christ, Pan's Labyrinth, and Apocalypto (plus the majorities of Babel and Inglourious Basterds); as well as feature-length documentaries like Fahrenheit 9/11, March of the Penguins, Earth, and Michael Jackson's This Is It; ended up being very successful.
- Computer animation replaced traditional animation as the dominant technique for animated pictures in American cinema, especially after the release of Shrek, which is the first film to win the Academy Award for Best Animated Feature. Further extending to the exploration of motion capture technology in such films as Robert Zemeckis' The Polar Express, Beowulf, and A Christmas Carol. However, hand-drawn anime films also gained more exposure outside of Japan with the releases of Hayao Miyazaki's Spirited Away, Howl's Moving Castle, and Ponyo; while stop-motion films earned significant audience interest thanks to Chicken Run, Wallace & Gromit: The Curse of the Were-Rabbit, Corpse Bride, and Coraline. DreamWorks Animation was the top animation studio of the decade, with Pixar and 20th Century Fox Animation following close behind (the latter after Fox Animation Studios was shut down on October 31, 2000).
- Major film studios started to focus their budgets on established titles with built-in fandoms to lower the risk of commercial failures and maximize financial profits. Increasing the productions of sequels, prequels, remakes, reboots, adaptations, spin-offs, crossovers, and so on; often as attempts to create or revive franchises. Capitalizing especially on nostalgia induced by the likes of Shaft, Charlie's Angels, Planet of the Apes, Scooby-Doo, Terminator 3: Rise of the Machines, Freddy vs. Jason, Starsky & Hutch, Alien vs. Predator, Herbie: Fully Loaded, The Dukes of Hazzard, King Kong, Superman Returns, Miami Vice, Rocky Balboa, TMNT, Transformers, Live Free or Die Hard, Rambo, Indiana Jones and the Kingdom of the Crystal Skull, G.I. Joe: The Rise of Cobra, and many others. Out of the 50 highest-grossing films of the decade worldwide, only nine (of which six are animated) are not based on another property, though one of these became the top-grosser of all time: late 2009's Avatar.

== Highest-grossing films ==
The list has more 2008 and 2007 films in the top 50 than any other year, each with eight. They are followed by 2009, 2005 and 2004, each with six. Figures are given in United States dollars (USD).

List of worldwide highest-grossing films
Rank	Title	Studios	Worldwide gross	Year	Ref.
1	Avatar	20th Century Fox	$2,743,577,587	2009	
2	The Lord of the Rings: The Return of the King	New Line Cinema	$1,140,682,011	2003	
3	Pirates of the Caribbean: Dead Man's Chest	Walt Disney Studios	$1,066,179,725	2006	
4	The Dark Knight	Warner Bros. Pictures	$1,003,845,358	2008	
5	Harry Potter and the Philosopher's Stone	Warner Bros. Pictures	$974,755,371	2001	
6	Pirates of the Caribbean: At World's End	Walt Disney Studios	$960,996,492	2007	
7	Harry Potter and the Order of the Phoenix	Warner Bros. Pictures	$941,676,843	2007	
8	The Lord of the Rings: The Two Towers	New Line Cinema	$936,689,735	2002	
9	Harry Potter and the Half-Blood Prince	Warner Bros. Pictures	$933,959,197	2009	
10	Shrek 2	DreamWorks Animation	$929,098,316	2004	
11	Harry Potter and the Goblet of Fire	Warner Bros. Pictures	$895,921,036	2005	
12	Spider-Man 3	Sony Pictures/Columbia Pictures	$895,871,626	2007	
13	Ice Age: Dawn of the Dinosaurs	20th Century Fox/Blue Sky	$886,686,817	2009	
14	The Lord of the Rings: The Fellowship of the Ring	New Line Cinema	$883,726,270	2001	
15	Harry Potter and the Chamber of Secrets	Warner Bros. Pictures	$878,979,634	2002	
16	Finding Nemo	Walt Disney Studios/Pixar	$871,014,978	2003	
17	Star Wars: Episode III – Revenge of the Sith	20th Century Fox	$849,997,605	2005	
18	Transformers: Revenge of the Fallen	Paramount Pictures/DreamWorks Pictures	$836,303,693	2009	
19	Spider-Man	Sony Pictures/Columbia Pictures	$821,708,551	2002	
20	Shrek the Third	Paramount Pictures/DreamWorks Animation	$813,367,380	2007	
21	Harry Potter and the Prisoner of Azkaban	Warner Bros. Pictures	$808,481,128	2004	
22	Indiana Jones and the Kingdom of the Crystal Skull	Paramount Pictures/Lucasfilm	$786,636,033	2008	
23	Spider-Man 2	Sony Pictures/Columbia Pictures	$783,766,341	2004	
24	2012	Sony Pictures/Columbia Pictures	$769,679,473	2009	
25	The Da Vinci Code	Sony Pictures/Columbia Pictures	$760,006,945	2006	
26	The Chronicles of Narnia: The Lion, the Witch and the Wardrobe	Buena Vista Pictures/Walden Media	$745,011,272	2005	
27	The Matrix Reloaded	Warner Bros. Pictures	$742,128,461	2003	
28	Up	Walt Disney Studios/Pixar	$735,099,082	2009	
29	The Twilight Saga: New Moon	Summit Entertainment	$709,827,462	2009	
30	Transformers	Paramount Pictures/DreamWorks Pictures	$709,709,780	2007	
31	Ice Age: The Meltdown	20th Century Fox/Blue Sky	$660,998,756	2006	
32	Pirates of the Caribbean: The Curse of the Black Pearl	Walt Disney Studios	$654,264,015	2003	
33	Star Wars: Episode II – Attack of the Clones	20th Century Fox	$653,741,940	2002	
34	Kung Fu Panda	Paramount Pictures/DreamWorks Animation	$632,037,515	2008	
35	The Incredibles	Walt Disney Studios/Pixar	$631,442,092	2004	
36	Hancock	Sony Pictures/Columbia Pictures	$629,443,428	2008	
37	Ratatouille	Walt Disney Studios/Pixar	$623,726,085	2007	
38	The Passion of the Christ	Icon Productions	$611,486,736	2004	
39	Mamma Mia!	Universal Pictures	$610,002,542	2008	
40	Casino Royale	Sony Pictures/MGM/Columbia Pictures	$606,099,584	2006	
41	Madagascar: Escape 2 Africa	Paramount Pictures/DreamWorks Animation	$603,900,344	2008	
42	War of the Worlds	Paramount Pictures/DreamWorks Pictures	$603,873,119	2005	
43	Quantum of Solace	Sony Pictures/MGM/Columbia Pictures	$589,580,939	2008	
44	I Am Legend	Warner Bros. Pictures	$585,410,052	2007	
45	Iron Man	Paramount Pictures/Marvel Studios	$585,133,287	2008	
46	Night at the Museum	20th Century Fox	$574,480,450	2006	
47	King Kong	Universal Pictures	$556,906,378	2005	
48	The Day After Tomorrow	20th Century Fox/Lionsgate Films	$552,639,571	2004	
49	Mission: Impossible 2	Paramount Pictures	$546,388,105	2000	
50	Madagascar	DreamWorks Animation	$542,063,846	2005	

=== Highest-grossing film per year ===
The fantasy genre became the annual top-grosser seven times in a row from four different franchises.

Year	Title	Studio(s)	Worldwide Gross	Ref.
2000	Mission: Impossible 2	Paramount	$546,288,105	
2001	Harry Potter and the Philosopher's Stone	Warner Bros.	$974,755,371	
2002	The Lord of the Rings: The Two Towers	New Line Cinema	$936,689,735	
2003	The Lord of the Rings: The Return of the King	New Line Cinema	$1,140,682,011	
2004	Shrek 2	DreamWorks SKG	$929,098,316	
2005	Harry Potter and the Goblet of Fire	Warner Bros.	$895,921,036	
2006	Pirates of the Caribbean: Dead Man's Chest	Disney	$1,066,179,725	
2007	Pirates of the Caribbean: At World's End	Disney	$960,996,492	
2008	The Dark Knight	Warner Bros.	$1,003,845,358	
2009	Avatar	20th Century Fox	$2,743,577,587	

== Most acclaimed films of the decade ==
According to Metacritic, which analysed many of the notable 'best films of the decade' lists to compile the results, the top twenty films most often and most notably included in these lists are:

1. There Will Be Blood
2. Eternal Sunshine of the Spotless Mind
3. Mulholland Drive
4. No Country for Old Men
5. The Lord of the Rings: The Return of the King
6. The Lord of the Rings: The Two Towers
7. Spirited Away
8. 4 Months, 3 Weeks and 2 Days
9. The Lord of the Rings: The Fellowship of the Ring
10. The Dark Knight
11. Amélie
12. Children of Men
13. Memento
14. Pan's Labyrinth
15. United 93
16. WALL-E
17. Almost Famous
18. Brokeback Mountain
19. Far from Heaven
20. Lost in Translation

The ten films released in the 2000s which got the highest average critic scores according to Metacritic are:

1. Pan's Labyrinth
2. 4 Months, 3 Weeks and 2 Days
3. Ratatouille
4. Spirited Away
5. The Hurt Locker
6. The Lord of the Rings: The Return of the King
7. Sideways
8. WALL-E
9. Crouching Tiger, Hidden Dragon
10. 35 Shots of Rum

BBC's 100 Greatest Films of the 21st Century poll of film critics listed the following as the top ten best films of the 2000s:

1. Mulholland Drive
2. In the Mood for Love
3. There Will Be Blood
4. Spirited Away
5. Eternal Sunshine of the Spotless Mind
6. Yi Yi
7. No Country for Old Men
8. Zodiac
9. Children of Men
10. 4 Months, 3 Weeks and 2 Days

The New York Times' list of "The 25 Best Films of the 21st Century So Far" selected the following as the top five best films of the 2000s:

1. There Will Be Blood
2. Spirited Away
3. Million Dollar Baby
4. The Death of Mr. Lazarescu
5. Yi Yi

Moviefone's list of "50 Best Movies of the Decade" included the following films in the top five:

1. Kill Bill
2. City of God
3. Battle Royale
4. No Country for Old Men
5. The Dark Knight

Filmmaker Quentin Tarantino selected the following as the best and most influential films of the decade:

1. Battle Royale
2. Anything Else
3. Dogville
4. The Host
5. Joint Security Area
6. Lost in Translation
7. Memories of Murder
8. Shaun of the Dead
9. Team America: World Police
10. Unbreakable

=== Awards ===
The following films received the most acclaim at the Academy Awards during the 2000s.

Year	Ceremony	Most nominations	Most awards	Best Picture
2000	73rd	Gladiator (12)	Gladiator (5)	Gladiator
2001	74th	The Lord of the Rings: The Fellowship of the Ring (13)	A Beautiful Mind and The Lord of the Rings: The Fellowship of the Ring (4)	A Beautiful Mind
2002	75th	Chicago (13)	Chicago (6)	Chicago
2003	76th	The Lord of the Rings: The Return of the King (11)	The Lord of the Rings: The Return of the King (11)	The Lord of the Rings: The Return of the King
2004	77th	The Aviator (11)	The Aviator (5)	Million Dollar Baby
2005	78th	Brokeback Mountain (8)	Brokeback Mountain, Crash, King Kong and Memoirs of a Geisha (3)	Crash
2006	79th	Dreamgirls (8)	The Departed (4)	The Departed
2007	80th	No Country for Old Men and There Will Be Blood (8)	No Country for Old Men (4)	No Country for Old Men
2008	81st	The Curious Case of Benjamin Button (13)	Slumdog Millionaire (8)	Slumdog Millionaire
2009	82nd	Avatar and The Hurt Locker (9)	The Hurt Locker (6)	The Hurt Locker

== List of films ==
- 2000 in film
- 2001 in film
- 2002 in film
- 2003 in film
- 2004 in film
- 2005 in film
- 2006 in film
- 2007 in film
- 2008 in film
- 2009 in film

== See also ==
- Film
- History of film
- Lists of films
- Popular culture: 2000s in music, 2000s in sports, 2000s in television
