= Overture =

Instrumental introduction to an opera, ballet, or oratorio

An overture (from French ouverture, lit. "opening") is an instrumental piece of music that is written to introduce a dramatic work such as a ballet, opera, or oratorio. During the early Romantic era, composers such as Beethoven and Mendelssohn composed overtures which were independent, self-existing, instrumental, programmatic works that foreshadowed genres such as the symphonic poem. These were "at first undoubtedly intended to be played at the head of a programme".

The idea of an instrumental opening to opera existed during the 17th century. Peri's Euridice opens with a brief instrumental ritornello, and Monteverdi's L'Orfeo (1607) opens with a toccata, in this case a fanfare for muted trumpets. More important was the prologue, consisting of sung dialogue between allegorical characters which introduced the overarching themes of the stories depicted.

== French overture ==
As a musical form, the French overture first appears in the court ballet and operatic overtures of Jean-Baptiste Lully, which he elaborated from a similar, two-section form called ouverture, found in the French ballets de cour as early as 1640. This French overture consists of a slow introduction in a marked "dotted rhythm" (i.e., exaggerated iambic, if the first chord is disregarded), followed by a lively movement in fugato style. The overture is frequently followed by a series of dance tunes before the curtain rises, and often returns following the Prologue to introduce the action proper. This ouverture style was also used in English opera, most notably Henry Purcell's Dido and Aeneas. Its distinctive rhythmic profile and function thus led to the French overture style found in the works of late Baroque composers such as Johann Sebastian Bach, George Frideric Handel, and Georg Philipp Telemann. The style is most often used in preludes to suites, and can be found in non-staged vocal works such as cantatas, for example in the opening chorus of Bach's cantata Nun komm, der Heiden Heiland, BWV 61. Handel also uses the French overture form in some of his Italian operas, such as Giulio Cesare.

== Italian overture ==
In Italy, a distinct form called "overture" arose in the 1680s, became established particularly through the operas of Alessandro Scarlatti, and spread throughout Europe, supplanting the French form as the standard operatic overture by the mid-18th century. Its stereotypical form is in three generally homophonic movements: fast–slow–fast. The opening movement is normally in duple metre and a major key; the slow movement in earlier examples is usually quite short, and sometimes in a contrasting key; the concluding movement is dancelike, most often with rhythms of the gigue or minuet, and returns to the key of the opening section. As the form evolved, the first movement often incorporated fanfare-like elements and took on the pattern of so-called "sonatina form" (sonata form without a development section), and the slow section became more extended and lyrical. Italian overtures were often detached from their operas and played as independent concert pieces. In this context, they became important in the early history of the symphony.

== 18th century ==
Prior to the 18th century, the symphony and the overture were almost interchangeable, with overtures being extracted from operas to serve as stand-alone instrumental works, and symphonies being tagged to the front of operas as overtures. With the reform of opera seria, the overture began to distinguish itself from the symphony, and composers began to link the content of overtures to their operas dramatically and emotionally. Elements from the opera are foreshadowed in the overture, following the reform ideology that the music and every other element on stages serves to enhance the plot. One such overture was that of La Magnifique by André-Ernest-Modeste Grétry, in which several of the arias are quoted. This "medley form" persists in the overtures to many works of musical theatre written in the 20th and 21st centuries.

== 19th-century opera ==
In 19th-century opera the overture, Vorspiel, Einleitung, Introduction, or whatever else it may be called, is generally nothing more definite than that portion of the music which takes place before the curtain rises. Richard Wagner's Vorspiel to Lohengrin is a short self-contained movement founded on the music of the Grail.

In Italian opera after about 1800, the "overture" became known as the sinfonia. Fisher also notes the term Sinfonia avanti l'opera (literally, the "symphony before the opera") was "an early term for a sinfonia used to begin an opera, that is, as an overture as opposed to one serving to begin a later section of the work".

== Concert overture ==
=== Early 19th century ===
Although by the end of the eighteenth century opera overtures were already beginning to be performed as separate items in the concert hall, the "concert overture", intended specifically as an individual concert piece without reference to stage performance and generally based on some literary theme, began to appear early in the Romantic era. Carl Maria von Weber wrote two concert overtures, Der Beherrscher der Geister ('The Ruler of the Spirits', 1811, a revision of the overture to his unfinished opera Rübezahl of 1805), and Jubel-Ouvertüre ('Jubilee Overture', 1818, incorporating God Save the King at its climax).

However, the overture A Midsummer Night's Dream (1826) by Felix Mendelssohn is generally regarded as the first concert overture. Mendelssohn's other contributions to this genre include his Calm Sea and Prosperous Voyage overture (1828), his overture The Hebrides (1830; also known as Fingal's Cave) and the overtures Die schöne Melusine (The Fair Melusine, 1834) and Ruy Blas (1839). Other notable early concert overtures were written by Hector Berlioz (e.g., Les Francs juges (1826), and Le corsaire (1828)).

=== Later 19th century ===
In the 1850s the concert overture began to be supplanted by the symphonic poem, a form devised by Franz Liszt in several works that began as dramatic overtures. The distinction between the two genres was the freedom to mould the musical form according to external programmatic requirements. The symphonic poem became the preferred form for the more "progressive" composers, such as César Franck, Camille Saint-Saëns, Richard Strauss, Alexander Scriabin, and Arnold Schoenberg, while more conservative composers like Anton Rubinstein, Pyotr Ilyich Tchaikovsky, Johannes Brahms, Robert Schumann and Arthur Sullivan remained faithful to the overture.

Tchaikovsky's 1812 Overture

In the age when the symphonic poem had already become popular, Brahms wrote his Academic Festival Overture, Op. 80, as well as his Tragic Overture, Op. 81. An example clearly influenced by the symphonic poem is Tchaikovsky's 1812 Overture. His equally well-known Romeo and Juliet is also labelled a 'fantasy-overture'.

=== 20th century ===
In European music after 1900, an example of an overture displaying a connection with the traditional form is Dmitri Shostakovich's Festive Overture, Op. 96 (1954), which is in two linked sections, "Allegretto" and "Presto" (Temperley 2001). Malcolm Arnold's A Grand, Grand Overture, Op. 57 (1956), is a 20th-century parody of the late 19th century concert overture, scored for an enormous orchestra with organ, additional brass instruments, and obbligato parts for four rifles, three Hoover vacuum cleaners (two uprights in B♭, one horizontal with detachable sucker in C), and an electric floor polisher in E♭; it is dedicated "to President Hoover".

One song of the Who's rock opera Tommy is designated as "Underture".

== Film ==
In motion pictures, an overture is a piece of music setting the mood for the film before the opening credits start. Famous examples include Gone with the Wind (1939) and Lawrence of Arabia (1962). For a comprehensive list, see the list of films with overtures.

== List of standard repertoire ==
Some well-known or commonly played overtures:

- Anton Arensky: A Dream on the Volga
- Malcolm Arnold:
  - Beckus the Dandipratt
  - A Grand, Grand Overture
  - Peterloo
  - Tam O'Shanter
- Daniel Auber: Fra Diavolo
- Samuel Barber: Overture to The School for Scandal
- Arnold Bax: Overture to a Picaresque Comedy
- Ludwig van Beethoven:
  - Leonora Nr 1
  - Leonora Nr 2
  - Leonora Nr 3
  - Fidelio
  - Coriolan Overture
  - Creatures of Prometheus
  - Egmont
  - The Ruins of Athens
  - The Consecration of the House
- Arthur Benjamin
  - Overture to an Italian Comedy
- Hector Berlioz:
  - Benvenuto Cellini
  - Le carnaval romain
  - Le corsair
  - Les Francs-Juges
  - King Lear
  - Waverley
- Leonard Bernstein: Candide
- Georges Bizet: Carmen
- Alexander Borodin: Prince Igor
- Johannes Brahms:
  - Academic Festival Overture
  - Tragic Overture
- Anton Bruckner: Overture in G minor (WAB 98)
- Aaron Copland: An Outdoor Overture
- Antonín Dvořák: Carnival Overture
- Edward Elgar:
  - In the South (Alassio)
  - Cockaigne
  - Froissart
- George Gershwin:
  - Cuban Overture
  - Overture to Strike Up the Band
- Philip Glass:
  - Overture 2012
  - King Lear Overture
- Mikhail Glinka: Ruslan and Lyudmila
- Christoph Willibald Gluck:
  - Iphigénie en Tauride
  - Orfeo ed Euridice
  - Alceste
- Antônio Carlos Gomes: Il Guarany
- Edvard Grieg: In Autumn
- George Frideric Handel
  - Overture to the Music for the Royal Fireworks
  - Overture to the Water Music
  - Overture to Messiah and other Oratorios
- Joseph Haydn: Armida
- Ferdinand Hérold: Zampa
- John Ireland:
  - A London Overture
  - Satyricon Overture
- Édouard Lalo: Le roi d'Ys
- Franz Lehár: The Merry Widow
- Andrew Lloyd Webber:
  - "Overture from Phantom of the Opera"
- Hamish MacCunn: The Land of the Mountain and the Flood
- Felix Mendelssohn:
  - The Hebrides (or Fingal's Cave)
  - Calm Sea and Prosperous Voyage
  - A Midsummer Night's Dream
  - Ruy Blas
  - Die schöne Melusine (The Fair Melusine)
- Wolfgang Amadeus Mozart:
  - The Marriage of Figaro
  - La clemenza di Tito
  - Così fan tutte
  - Don Giovanni
  - Idomeneo
  - Die Entführung aus dem Serail
  - The Magic Flute
- Modest Mussorgsky: Khovanshchina
- Nikolai Myaskovsky:
  - Pathetic Overture
  - Salutation Overture
- Otto Nicolai: The Merry Wives of Windsor
- Carl Nielsen:
  - Maskarade
  - Helios Overture
- Jacques Offenbach: Orpheus in the Underworld
- Sergei Prokofiev: Overture on Hebrew Themes
- Emil von Reznicek: Donna Diana
- Nikolai Rimsky-Korsakov:
  - Russian Easter Festival Overture
  - The Maid of Pskov
  - May Night
- Gioachino Rossini:
  - La cambiale di matrimonio
  - Tancredi
  - Il signor Bruschino
  - Il turco in Italia
  - La Cenerentola
  - Semiramide
  - Il viaggio a Reims
  - The Barber of Seville
  - La gazza ladra
  - L'italiana in Algeri
  - La scala di seta
  - William Tell
- Franz Schubert:
  - Overture in Italian Style, D590
  - Rosamunde
- Robert Schumann:
  - Overture, Scherzo and Finale, Op 52
  - Manfred
  - Genoveva
  - Faust
  - Julius Caesar
  - Hermann und Dorothea
  - The Bride of Messina
- Dmitri Shostakovich: Festive Overture
- Bedřich Smetana: The Bartered Bride
- Johann Strauss: Die Fledermaus
- Jean Sibelius: Overture to The Tempest
- Arthur Sullivan:
  - The Mikado
  - The Gondoliers
  - The Yeomen of the Guard
- Franz von Suppé
  - Light Cavalry Overture
  - The Beautiful Galatea
  - Poet and Peasant
- Pyotr Ilyich Tchaikovsky:
  - 1812 Overture
  - Hamlet (Overture-Fantasy)
  - Romeo and Juliet (Overture-Fantasy)
  - The Nutcracker (Miniature Overture)
- Giuseppe Verdi:
  - La forza del destino
  - Nabucco
  - I vespri siciliani
- Richard Wagner:
  - Faust Overture
  - The Flying Dutchman
  - Lohengrin (both Act and Act III Preludes)
  - Die Meistersinger von Nürnberg
  - Rienzi
  - Tannhäuser
- Ralph Vaughan Williams: The Wasps
- William Walton
  - Johannesburg Festival Overture
  - Scapino Overture
  - Portsmouth Point Overture
- Carl Maria von Weber:
  - Euryanthe
  - Der Freischütz
  - Oberon
- James Barnes
  - "Alvamar Overture"
  - "Appalachian Overture"

== General and cited references ==
- Anon. 1957. "Music: Op. I for Vacuum Cleaners" Time (April 22).
- Atkins, John (2000). The Who on Record: A Critical History, 1963–1998. McFarland. ISBN 978-0-7864-0609-8.
- Blom, Eric. 1954. "Overture". Grove's Dictionary of Music and Musicians, fifth edition, edited by Eric Blom. London: Macmillan Publishers; Toronto, Canada: Macmillan Publishers.
- Burrows, Donald. 2012. Handel, second edition. Master Musicians Series. Oxford and New York: Oxford University Press.
- Burton-Page, Piers. n.d. "Malcolm Arnold: A Grand, Grand Overture, Programme Note". Chester-Novello publisher's website (accessed 6 November 2009).
- Carter, Tim (2001). "Prologue". In Sadie, Stanley; Tyrrell, John (eds.). The New Grove Dictionary of Music and Musicians (2nd ed.). London: Macmillan. ISBN 978-1-56159-239-5..
- Charlton, David and M. Elizabeth C. Bartlet. n.d. "Grétry, André-Ernest-Modeste." Grove Music Online.Oxford Music Online. Oxford University Press, accessed March 29, 2016,http://www.oxfordmusiconline.com/subscriber/article/grove/music/43361.
- Fisher, Stephen C. 1998. "Sinfonia". The New Grove Dictionary of Opera, four volumes, edited by Stanley Sadie. London: Macmillan Publishers, Inc. ISBN 0-333-73432-7.
- Fisher, Stephen C. 2001. "Italian Overture." The New Grove Dictionary of Music and Musicians, second edition, edited by Stanley Sadie and John Tyrrell. London: Macmillan Publishers.
- Larue, Jan. 2001. "Sinfonia 2: After 1700". The New Grove Dictionary of Music and Musicians, second edition, edited by Stanley Sadie and John Tyrrell. London: Macmillan Publishers.
- Maycock, Robert. 2009. "What's On/Programme Notes, Malcolm Arnold (1921–2006), A Grand, Grand Overture, Op. 57 (1956)" BBC Proms programme, Prom 76: Last Night of the Proms (Saturday 12 September).
- Taruskin, Richard. n.d. Chapter 10: "Instrumental Music Lifts Off." In his Music In The Seventeenth And Eighteenth Centuries (Oxford History of Western Music). New York: Oxford University Press. Retrieved 29 March 2016.
- Temperley, Nicholas. 2001. "Overture". The New Grove Dictionary of Music and Musicians, second edition, edited by Stanley Sadie and John Tyrrell. London: Macmillan Publishers.
- This article incorporates text from a publication now in the public domain: Tovey, Donald Francis (1911). "Overture". In Chisholm, Hugh (ed.). Encyclopædia Britannica. Vol. 20 (11th ed.). Cambridge University Press. pp. 384–385.
- Waterman, George Gow, and James R. Anthony. 2001. "French Overture". The New Grove Dictionary of Music and Musicians, second edition, edited by Stanley Sadie and John Tyrrell. London: Macmillan Publishers.
