= List of satirical films =

This is a list of films that incorporate satire or were described as such. Made-for-television and animated films are also included.

| Title | Year | Credits | Country | Subgenre |
|---|---|---|---|---|
| La signora di tutti | 1934 | Directed by Max Ophüls; Written by Salvator Gotta (novel), Curt Alexander, Hans Wilhelm, Max Ophüls | Italy | Drama |
| The Rules of the Game | 1939 | Directed by Jean Renoir; Written by Renoir, Carl Koch | France | Drama |
| A Face in the Crowd | 1957 | Directed by Elia Kazan; Written by Budd Schulberg | United States | Drama |
| A Bucket of Blood | 1959 | Directed by Roger Corman written by Charles B. Griffith | United States | Comedy horror |
| The Manchurian Candidate | 1962 | Directed by John Frankenheimer; Written by George Axelrod and based on The Manchurian Candidate by Richard Condon | United States | Thriller (Political, neo-noir, psychological) |
| Le Mépris | 1963 | Directed by Jean-Luc Godard; Based on Il disprezzo by Alberto Moravia | International (France, Italy) | Drama (French New Wave) |
| Dr. Strangelove or: How I Learned to Stop Worrying and Love the Bomb | 1964 | Directed by Stanley Kubrick; Based on Red Alert by Peter George | International (United Kingdom, United States) | Comedy-science fiction |
| Night of the Living Dead | 1968 | Directed by George A. Romero; Written by Romero, John Russo | United States | Horror (Zombie) |
| Sleeper | 1973 | Directed by Woody Allen; Written by Allen, Marshall Brickman | United States | Comedy-science fiction |
| The Werewolf of Washington | 1973 | Written and directed by Milton Moses Ginsberg | United States | Horror-comedy |
| House of Whipcord | 1974 | Directed by Pete Walker; Written by David McGillivray, Walker | United Kingdom | Horror |
| Network | 1976 | Directed by Sidney Lumet; Written by Paddy Chayefsky | United States | Drama |
| Dawn of the Dead | 1978 | Directed and written by Romero | United States | Horror (Zombie) |
| Tootsie | 1982 | Directed by Sydney Pollack; Written by Larry Gelbart, Murray Schisgal | United States | Romance |
| This Is Spınal Tap: A Rockumentary by Martin Di Bergi | 1984 | Directed by Rob Reiner; Written by Christopher Guest, Michael McKean, Harry Shearer, Reiner | United States | Mockumentary |
| Max Headroom: 20 Minutes into the Future (TV-film) | 1984 | Directed by Rocky Morton, Annabel Jankel | United Kingdom | Science fiction (Cyberpunk) |
| Nineteen Eighty-Four | 1984 | Written and directed by Michael Radford | United Kingdom | Dystopian |
| Brazil | 1985 | Directed by Terry Gilliam; Written by Gilliam, Tom Stoppard, Charles McKeown | United Kingdom | Science fiction drama |
| Desert Bloom | 1986 | Directed by Eugene Corr and written by Corr and Linda Remy | United States | Drama |
| RoboCop | 1987 | Directed by Paul Verhoeven; Written by Edward Neumeier, Michael Miner | United States | Science fiction-action |
| They Live | 1988 | Directed by John Carpenter; Written by Frank Armitage and based on "Eight O'Clock in the Morning" by Ray Nelson | United States | Science fiction-action |
| The Distinguished Gentleman | 1992 | Directed by Jonathan Lynn; Written by Marty Kaplan, Jonathan Reynolds | United States | Comedy |
| Bob Roberts | 1992 | Written and directed by Tim Robbins | United States | Mockumentary |
| Demolition Man | 1993 | Directed by Marco Brambilla; Written (disputed) by Daniel Waters, Robert Reneau, Peter M. Lenkov | United States | Science fiction-action |
| Groundhog Day | 1993 | Directed by Harold Ramis; Written by Danny Rubin, Harold Ramis | United States | Romance |
| Starship Troopers | 1997 | Directed by Paul Verhoeven; Based on Starship Troopers by Robert A. Heinlein | United States | Science fiction-action |
| The Truman Show | 1998 | Directed by Peter Weir; Written by Andrew Niccol | United States | Comedy drama |
| But I'm a Cheerleader | 1999 | Directed by Jamie Babbit; Written by Brian Wayne Peterson | United States | Comedy |
| American Beauty | 1999 | Directed by Sam Mendes; Written by Alan Ball | United States | Drama |
| Fight Club | 1999 | Directed by David Fincher; Written by Jim Uhls | United States | Drama |
| Battle Royale | 2000 | Directed by Kinji Fukasaku; Based on Battle Royale by Koushun Takami | Japan | Thriller-action |
| Dumplings | 2004 | Directed by Fruit Chan; Written by Lilian Lee | Hong Kong | Horror |
| Thank You for Smoking | 2005 | Written and directed by Jason Reitman | United States | Black comedy |
| Land of the Dead | 2005 | Written and directed by George A. Romero | International (Canada, France, United States) | Horror (Zombie, Post-apocalyptic) |
| Idiocracy | 2006 | Written by Mike Judge and Etan Cohen; Directed by Mike Judge | United States | Science fiction-Comedy |
| Long Pigs | 2007 | Written and directed by Chris Power and Nathan Hynes | Canada | Horror-Pseudo-documentary |
| District 9 | 2009 | Directed by Neill Blomkamp; Written by Blomkamp, Terri Tatchell | International (South Africa, United States, New Zealand) | Science fiction-action |
| The Cabin in the Woods | 2011 | Directed by Drew Goddard; Written by Goddard, Joss Whedon | United States | Comedy-horror |
| Nightcrawler | 2014 | Directed and written by Dan Gilroy | United States | Crime thriller |
| The Final Girls | 2015 | Directed by Todd Strauss-Schulson; Written by M.A. Fortin and Joshua John Miller | United States | Comedy-horror |
| Vice | 2018 | Directed by Adam McKay; Written by McKay | United States | Biographical |
| Friend of the World | 2020 | Written and directed by Brian Patrick Butler | United States | Body horror |
| Alice, Through the Looking | 2021 | Directed by Adam Donen; Inspired by the novels by Lewis Carroll | International (Germany, United Kingdom) | Political satire |
| Ron's Gone Wrong | 2021 | Directed by Sarah Smith and Jean-Philippe Vine; Written by Peter Baynham and Sarah Smith | United Kingdom; United States | Animated science fiction comedy |
| Tughlaq Durbar | 2021 | Directed by Delhi Prasad Deenadayalan; Written by Deenadayalan, Balaji Tharaneetharan | India | Political |
| Triangle of Sadness | 2022 | Directed and written by Ruben Östlund | International (Sweden, Germany, France, United Kingdom) | Black comedy |
| The Menu | 2022 | Directed by Mark Mylod; Written by Seth Reiss and Will Tracy | United States | Horror thriller |
| Good Savage | 2023 | Directed by Santiago Mohar Volkow; Written by Andrew Leland Rogers and Santiago Mohar Volkow | Mexico | Black comedy |
| Hemet, or the Landlady Don't Drink Tea | 2023 | Directed by Tony Olmos Written by Brian Patrick Butler | United States | Political dystopian |
| A History of Love and War | 2024 | Directed and written by Santiago Mohar Volkow | Mexico | Satirical comedy |
| We Shall Not Be Moved | 2024 | Directed by Pierre Saint-Martin; Written by Iker Compeán Leroux and Pierre Saint-Martin | Mexico | Black comedy-drama |
| Ciao Ciao | 2025 | Directed by Keith Albert Tedesco Written by Keith Albert Tedesco, Antonella Axisa, Chris Dingli and Mikhail Basmadjian | Malta | Comedy-drama |

== See also ==
- Satirical film

Category
