= 2000s in sports =

This timeline of the 2000s in sports is a chronological list of sporting events between 2000 and 2009.

== Notable events ==
- The World Series (in 2000, 2002, 2005, and 2006), NBA Finals (in 2003, 2005, and 2007), BCS (in 2004) and Men's NCAA Basketball Championship Game (in 2004) all hit record lows in Nielsen ratings and/or total viewers in America.
- Basketball decreases in popularity in the U.S. with the loss of Michael Jordan to retirement, the Kobe Bryant controversy, the Pacers–Pistons brawl, the 2007 betting scandal, and a new television deal signed in 2002 relegates most NBA games to cable. Kobe Bryant became popular again, during and after the 2008 summer olympics.
- Baseball in the United States undergoes controversy and Congressional scrutiny due to steroids; stars such as Barry Bonds and Mark McGwire, ranked #1 and #2 in single-season home runs, are suspected to have used steroids, while others such as Jason Giambi and Rafael Palmeiro are confirmed to have been using the drugs. Thanks to two consecutive years of Boston Red Sox–New York Yankees American League Championship Series, however, ratings and popularity for the sport (while lower than previous years) still remain high.
- The National Hockey League suffers a lockout that wiped out the entire 2005 season, as well a television deal with OLN that prevented many fans from being able to see games (several NHL telecasts on OLN were outdrawn by WNBA games on ESPN2 ).
- NASCAR Racing becomes more mainstream as TV ratings for the sport grows in the U.S.. NASCAR races regularly outdraw NBA, MLB and NHL telecasts by over 200 percent (in fact, NASCAR's average rating in 2005 outdid the combined regular season averages for the NBA and Major League Baseball during that same year). TV networks such as Fox, NBC, ABC, and TNT air races on a regular basis on Sundays and sometimes Saturday nights. Popular drivers during this period include Jimmie Johnson, Matt Kenseth, Tony Stewart, Dale Earnhardt Jr., Jeff Gordon, and Kasey Kahne.
- American football continues to become more popular; Super Bowl XLI, in which the Indianapolis Colts defeated the Chicago Bears 29-17 becomes the third most watched television event in the US market ever. The NFL also draws criticism, especially following the Super Bowl XXXVIII fiasco, the Terrell Owens controversy in 2004 and 2005, and the Michael Vick dogfighting fallout in 2007. The NFL undergoes significant upheaval in its international activity, discontinuing NFL Europa but holding regular season games outside the US in Mexico City, London and Toronto. College Football is popular with stars such as Tim Tebow, Matt Leinart, Vince Young, Reggie Bush and Darren McFadden. American football's biggest flop of the decade was Vince McMahon's XFL which was born and die in 2001.
- The Boston Red Sox break the 86 year "Curse of the Bambino" by defeating the St. Louis Cardinals in the 2004 World Series (they also won in 2007). The following year the Chicago White Sox beat the Houston Astros to win the 2005 World Series, winning their first since 1917.
- Horse racing in the United States enjoys a surge in ratings, thanks to three straight years of Triple Crown hopefuls (War Emblem, Funny Cide and Smarty Jones in 2002, 2003 and 2004). However, all three horses fail to win the Triple Crown, and the next hopeful (Barbaro in 2006) is severely injured during the Preakness.
- Beach volleyball becomes an increasingly popular sport worldwide, establishing its first generation of superstars and branching out into large inland cities.
- Football begins to gain popularity amongst North Americans and Australians, fuelled by World Cup successes for the USA in 2002 and Australia in 2006. Previously, North America and Australia had been considered the only continents to not have pertinent followers of World Football.
- A basketball game between the Indiana Pacers and Detroit Pistons is called almost 50 seconds early due to a massive fan-player brawl, an event which became known as Pacers–Pistons brawl.
- Many British football clubs are being bought by Eastern European millionaires such as Chelsea by Roman Abramovich, Hearts by Vladimir Romanov and Portsmouth F.C. by Milan Mandarić and Alexandre Gaydamak.
- The IRB Rugby World Cup increases in size and audience to become the third most watched sporting event in the world after the FIFA World Cup and The Summer Olympics respectively.
- WADA, The World Anti-doping Agency, introduces a standardised anti-doping code for all sports.
- P.R. China's sportsmen make continuous improvements in several sports, in preparation for the Beijing (北京) Olympic Games.
- Professional wrestling, which had separate golden ages in the 1980s and 1990s, begins to decline in popularity in North America. Many attribute this decline to the monopoly on the industry held by World Wrestling Entertainment after the collapse of both World Championship Wrestling and Extreme Championship Wrestling in 2001, with WWE acquiring the remains of both companies. However, WWE would revive ECW as a third brand alongside its RAW and SmackDown! brands in 2006 due to increased nostalgia. Because of the WWE's monopoly and the internet helping to spread word, a trend begins with smaller independent promotions garnering many fans during the decade. During this period Total Nonstop Action Wrestling attempts to create an alternative to the WWE product with little success. The deaths of WWE stars Eddie Guerrero in 2005 and Chris Benoit in 2007, gave the WWE mainstream publicity. WWE continues to be popular overseas during this period, which prompts them to increase the number of televised foreign shows. Female wrestlers gain more exposure with the WWE expanding its women's division and adding a second women's championship, the Divas title. Later in the decade, women's wrestling also gains exposure and credibility through TNA creating their own division, and with the all-female promotion Shimmer Women Athletes. Ring of Honor essentially establishes itself as the number three company in the United States. Finally, in puroresu, a mass exodus occurs in All Japan Pro Wrestling in 2000, with almost all contracted employees following Mitsuharu Misawa to form Pro Wrestling Noah later that year. Many figures have been: Triple H, Randy Orton, Ric Flair, Batista, Edge, John Cena, The Undertaker. Shawn Michaels, Jeff and Matt Hardy, and Chris Jericho.
- In light of the waning popularity of professional wrestling and boxing, mixed martial arts competitions such as the Ultimate Fighting Championship and Pride Fighting Championships gain popularity in the United States. Top stars such as Chuck Liddell, Randy Couture and Tito Ortiz become household names and the UFC is featured on the May cover of Sports Illustrated. However boxing still retains a healthy following, with exciting and popular fighters including Oscar De La Hoya, Sugar Shane Mosley, Joe Calzaghe, Floyd Mayweather, Jr., Diego Corrales, Manny Pacquiao, and many others. Many exciting fights have also taken place.
- Rugby league in Australia enjoys increasing popularity amongst the Eastern states, with record crowd figures almost yearly from 2003 onwards. The national competition, the National Rugby League, has 6 different winners in the space of 6 seasons.
- The New Zealand Kiwis defeated the Australian Kangaroos in the finals of the 2005 Rugby League Tri-Nations of the 2008 Rugby League World Cup. These victories put an end to Australia's dominance in international rugby league - one of the strongest in world sport. 2005 was the first time Australia had failed to win a series or tournament since 1978. 2008 was the first time New Zealand won the World Cup and the first time Australia failed to win the World Cup since 1972.
- In the NFL, the New England Patriots, led by head coach Bill Belichick and quarterback Tom Brady, win three championships in four years ('01, '03, and '04). In 2007, the Patriots become the first (and only) team to go 16-0 in the regular season, only to lose against the New York Giants in Super Bowl XLII. In 2008, the Detroit Lions became the first team to go 0-16 in a season. The Pittsburgh Steelers also had a great run during 2001-2010, winning two Super Bowls, six division titles, and three conference titles.
- A 2003 revival of roller derby in Austin, Texas, leads to the rise of the fastest growing sport of the decade, with over 450 new roller derby leagues forming worldwide.
- At 2009 in the 121st IOC Session golf and rugby union (specifically the sevens version) readmitted to the Olympic program in 2016.
- Popular and notable NFL quarterbacks of the 2000s include Phillip Rivers, Eli Manning, Peyton Manning, Ben Roethlisberger, Drew Brees, Donovan McNabb, Michael Vick, and Tony Romo.
- Popular MLB players of the 2000s include Albert Pujols, Randy Johnson, Alex Rodriguez, Barry Bonds, and Derek Jeter.

=== Olympic Games ===
Five Olympic Games were held in this decade

2000 XXVII Summer Olympics - Sydney, Australia (most gold medal wins (United States) USA)
2002 XIX Winter Olympics - (United States) Salt Lake City, USA (most gold medal wins Norway)
2004 XXVIII Summer Olympics - Athens, Greece (most gold medal wins (United States) USA)
2006 XX Winter Olympics - Turin, Italy (most gold medal wins Germany)
2008 XXIX Summer Olympics - Beijing, China (most gold medal wins China)

=== Basketball ===
USA basketball teams dominated this era, especially in the Olympics. However USA female basketball teams were better than men scoring all golds on Olympic events during this time (Sydney, Athens, Beijing). The loss of the gold by USA male basketball team, and only 3rd position during 2004 Athens Olympic (compared to gold of the previous and next Olympics), with the winning stands by Argentina team and silver Italy was noted.

=== Cricket ===
There have been two ICC Cricket World Cups this decade:

2003 Cricket World Cup - South Africa (winner Australia)
2007 Cricket World Cup - West Indies (winner Australia)

=== Cycling ===
There have been the usual 10 tour de frances held in the 2000s (decade) decade.

2000 Tour de France - started in Futuroscope, France (winner (United States) Lance Armstrong)
2001 Tour de France - started in Dunkerque, France (winner (United States) Lance Armstrong)
2002 Tour de France - started in Luxembourg, Luxembourg (winner (United States) Lance Armstrong)
2003 Tour de France - started in Paris, France (winner (United States) Lance Armstrong)
2004 Tour de France - started in Liège, Belgium (winner (United States) Lance Armstrong)
2005 Tour de France - started in Vendée, France (winner (United States) Lance Armstrong)
2006 Tour de France - started in Strasbourg, France (winner (Spain) Óscar Pereiro)
2007 Tour de France - started in London, United Kingdom (winner (Spain) Alberto Contador)
2008 Tour de France - started in Brest, France (winner (Spain) Carlos Sastre)
2009 Tour de France - started in Monaco (winner (Spain) Alberto Contador)

=== Football (Australian) ===
2000 AFL Grand Final - Essendon 19.21 (135) defeated Melbourne 11.9 (75)
2001 AFL Grand Final - Brisbane 15.18 (108) defeated Essendon 12.10 (82)
2002 AFL Grand Final - Brisbane 10.15 (75) defeated Collingwood 9.12 (66)
2003 AFL Grand Final - Brisbane 20.14 (134) defeated Collingwood 12.12 (84)
2004 AFL Grand Final - Port Adelaide 17.11 (113) defeated Brisbane 10.13 (73)
2005 AFL Grand Final - Sydney 8.10 (58) defeated West Coast 7.12 (54)
2006 AFL Grand Final - West Coast 12.13 (85) defeated Sydney 12.12 (84)
2007 AFL Grand Final - Geelong 24.19 (163) defeated Port Adelaide 6.8 (44)
2008 AFL Grand Final - Hawthorn 18.7 (115) defeated Geelong 11.23 (89)
2009 AFL Grand Final - Geelong 12.8 (80) defeated St Kilda 9.14 (68)

=== Football (Association, Soccer) ===
There have been two FIFA World Cups this decade:

- 2002 FIFA World Cup - South Korea & Japan (winner Brazil)
- 2006 FIFA World Cup - Germany (winner Italy)

Continental championships of nations:

- 2000 Africa Cup of Nations - Ghana & Nigeria (winner Cameroon)
- UEFA Euro 2000 - Belgium & Netherlands (winner France)
- 2000 AFC Asian Cup - Lebanon (winner Japan)
- 2001 Copa América - Colombia (winner Colombia)
- 2002 Africa Cup of Nations - Mali (winner Cameroon)
- UEFA Euro 2004 - Portugal (winner Greece)
- 2004 Africa Cup of Nations - Tunisia (winner Tunisia)
- 2004 AFC Asian Cup - China (winner Japan)
- 2004 Copa América - Peru (winner Brazil)
- 2006 Africa Cup of Nations - Egypt (winner Egypt)
- 2007 AFC Asian Cup - Indonesia/ Malaysia/ Thailand/ Vietnam (winner Iraq)
- 2007 Copa América - Venezuela (winner Brazil)
- UEFA Euro 2008 - Austria & Switzerland (winner Spain)
- 2008 Africa Cup of Nations - Ghana (winner Egypt)

UEFA Champions league winners:

- 1999–2000 UEFA Champions League - Winner (Spain) Real Madrid
- 2000–01 UEFA Champions League - Winner (Germany) Bayern Munich
- 2001–02 UEFA Champions League - Winner (Spain) Real Madrid
- 2002–03 UEFA Champions League - Winner (Italy) A.C. Milan
- 2003–04 UEFA Champions League - Winner (Portugal) Porto
- 2004–05 UEFA Champions League - Winner (England) Liverpool
- 2005–06 UEFA Champions League - Winner (Spain) Barcelona
- 2006–07 UEFA Champions League - Winner (Italy) A.C. Milan
- 2007–08 UEFA Champions League - Winner (England) Manchester United
- 2008–09 UEFA Champions League - Winner (Spain) Barcelona

FIFA Club World Cup:

- 2005 FIFA Club World Cup is won by (Brazil) São Paulo FC.
- 2006 FIFA Club World Cup is won by (Brazil) SC Internacional.
- 2007 FIFA Club World Cup is won by (Italy) AC Milan.
- 2008 FIFA Club World Cup is won by (England) Manchester United.
- 2009 FIFA Club World Cup is won by (Spain) Barcelona.

=== Golf ===
there has been 4 Ryder cups in this decade.

the 2002 Ryder Cup was won by Europe 15 and a half to USA's 12 and a half.

the 2004 Ryder Cup was won by Europe 18 and a half to USA's 9 and a half.

the 2006 Ryder Cup was won by Europe again 18 and a half to USA's 9 and a half

the 2008 Ryder Cup and last this decade was won by USA 16 and a half to Europe's 11 and a half.

this Decade Europe 3;1 USA

=== Ice Hockey ===
Stanley Cup Results:

2000 - New Jersey Devils defeated the Dallas Stars 4-2
2001 - Colorado Avalanche defeated the New Jersey Devils 4-3
2002 - Detroit Red Wings defeated the Carolina Hurricanes 4-1
2003 - New Jersey Devils defeated the Mighty Ducks of Anaheim 4-3
2004 - Tampa Bay Lightning defeated the Calgary Flames 4-3
2005 - Season Cancelled due to Lockout
2006 - Carolina Hurricanes defeated the Edmonton Oilers 4-3
2007 - Anaheim Ducks defeated the Ottawa Senators 4-1
2008 - Detroit Red Wings defeated the Pittsburgh Penguins 4-2
2009 - Pittsburgh Penguins defeated the Detroit Red Wings 4-3

Notable draft picks:
2008 – Steven Stamkos is first overall draft pick in the NHL draft picked by the Tampa Bay Lightning.

2007 – Patrick Kane is first overall draft pick in the NHL draft picked by the Chicago Blackhawks.

2005 – Sidney Crosby is first overall draft pick in the NHL draft picked by the Pittsburgh Penguins.

2005 – Anze Kopitar is eleventh overall draft pick in the NHL draft picked by the Los Angeles Kings.

2004 – Alexander Ovechkin is the first overall draft pick in the NHL draft picked by the Washington Capitals.

2004 – Evgeni Malkin is the second overall draft pick in the NHL draft picked by the Pittsburgh Penguins.

2003 – Eric Staal is second overall draft pick in the NHL draft picked by the Carolina Hurricanes.

2003 – Dion Phaneuf is ninth overall draft pick in the NHL draft picked by the Calgary Flames.

2003 – Jeff Carter is eleventh overall draft pick in the NHL draft picked by the Philadelphia Flyers.

2003 – Zach Parise is seventeenth overall draft pick in the NHL draft picked by the New Jersey Devils.

2003 – Ryan Getzlaf is nineteenth overall draft pick in the NHL draft picked by the Anaheim Ducks.

2003 – Mike Richards is second overall draft pick in the NHL draft picked by the Philadelphia Flyers.

2001 – Ilya Kovalchuk is first overall draft pick in the NHL draft picked by the Atlanta Thrashers.

2000 – Dany Heatley is second overall draft pick in the NHL draft picked by the Atlanta Thrashers.

2000 – Marian Gaborik is third overall draft pick in the NHL draft picked by the Minnesota Wild.

=== Motorsports ===
F1-Michael Schumacher wins World Championship for the third time at Suzuka, Japan 2000 in a Ferrari F1-2000, Ferrari's first driver's championship in 21 years

Ralph Dale Earnhardt, Sr. (Dale Earnhardt) dies after a last-lap crash during the Daytona 500 in February 2001

Michael Schumacher wins World Championship for the fourth time at Hungaroring, Hungary 2001 in a Ferrari F2001

Michael Schumacher wins fifth at Magny-Cours, France 2002 in a Ferrari F2002

Michael Schumacher wins sixth at Suzuka, Japan 2003 in a Ferrari F2003-GA

Michael Schumacher wins seventh and last at Spa-Francorchamps, Belgium 2004 in a Ferrari F2004

Fernando Alonso become youngest champion, winning his first at Interlagos, Brazil 2005 in a Renault R25

Fernando Alonso wins second at Interlagos, Brazil in 2006 driving a Renault R26

Kimi Räikkönen wins first World Championship at Interlagos, Brazil in 2007 driving a Ferrari F2007, winning by 1 point over Lewis Hamilton and Fernando Alonso (Both Vodafone McLaren Mercedes)

Lewis Hamiliton Wins F1 Championship 2008 beating Felipe Massa by one Point

Jenson Button wins F1 World Title 2009 for the first time for rookie team Brawn GP at Interlagos

Jimmie Johnson in 2009 won a fourth straight Sprint Cup championship title.

=== Rugby Union ===
There has been two Rugby World Cups this decade:

2003 Rugby World Cup - Australia (winner England defeated Australia)

2007 Rugby World Cup - France (winner South Africa defeated England)

=== Swimming and Diving ===
Michael Phelps won six gold medals in the 2004 Olympics, and a record eight in the 2008 Olympics (some of those medals coming from split-second wins). meanwhile back in the 2000 games, Dara Torres and Jenny Thompson got a bronze each after they made a 1 in a million occurrence of finishing the race both at exactly the same time.

=== Tennis ===
Roger Federer wins 15 grand slam titles (3 Australian Open's, 1 French Open, 6 Wimbledon titles, and 5 U.S. Open titles) to beat Pete Sampras' record.

Rafael Nadal beats Roger Federer at the 2008 Wimbledon final with a score of 6-4,6-4,5-7,5-7,9-7. People consider this match the greatest tennis match of all-time. The match lasted for 8 hours (with 2 rain delays).

Roger Federer played Andy Roddick in the 2009 Wimbledon final for his 15th Grand Slam championship. Roddick won the first set 6-4, then after a 6-2 Roddick tiebreak lead, Federer came back and won the 2nd set 7-6 and the 3rd set 7-6. Roddick then won the 4th set 6-3. Federer led Roddick 15-14 in the 5th set, finally broke Roddick and won the 5th set 16-14.

=== Track and Field ===
Jamaican sprinter Usain Bolt sets world records in the 100m and 200m.

Ethiopian Kenenisa Bekele sets world records in the 5,000m and 10,000m.

Alan Webb breaks Jim Ryun's high school mile record in 2001 with a 3:53.43, a record which had stood for 36 years. Later sets American record.

Galen Rupp breaks Gerry Lindgrens 40-year-old 5,000 meter high school record in 2004. It has since been surpassed by German Fernandez and Chris Derrick in 2008.

=== Volleyball ===
David Burt went 1st overall in the 2017 Volleyball draft
