= List of films about socialism =

This is a list of films in which the theme of socialism features prominently in the movie.

Films about socialism
Film	Year	Description
Capitalism: A Love Story	2009	A documentary by American filmmaker Michael Moore exploring and criticizing capitalism in America.
Che	2008	A two part biopic about the socialist revolutionary Ernesto "Che" Guevara.
Sicko	2007	A documentary by American filmmaker Michael Moore investigating health care in the United States and how it compares with socialized public health services.
Lights in the Dusk	2006	It has been argued that this film deals with the ways in which "[c]apitalism has painted the town red, just a different shade of red from its socialist connotations" as well as that "rock is so important to the director that a number of his males, including Koistinen, favor a 50s, greasy, sweptback hair style, to go along with their love of rock 'n' roll (definitely a reminder of how rock was the way to rebel in socialist countries)."
The Wind That Shakes The Barley	2006	A film set during the Irish War of Independence and Irish Civil War. The film shows the divergences in the Irish republican movement during the revolutionary period and the civil war.
The Killing Fields	1984	A film about the Khmer Rouge regime in Cambodia.
Reds	1981	Film about the life and career of John Reed, particularly his time in Petrograd which formed the basis of his book, Ten Days That Shook the World.
Winstanley	1975	A film about Gerrard Winstanley who along with the group known as the Diggers carried out one of the world's first socialist living experiments. The film reflects class antagonism between peasants and lords in a feudal economy.
The Working Class Goes to Heaven	1971	A satirical, political drama by Italian filmmaker Elio Petri.
La Chinoise	1967	A film by French New Wave director Jean-Luc Godard about a group of young Maoist activists in Paris.
Modern Times	1936	The film references the struggle of the working classes during the Great Depression; long working hours, little job security and meager salary, while the upper classes remain wealthy and bide their time. A tale of struggle of a working couple.
October: Ten Days That Shook the World	1928	A Soviet Union film by Sergei Eisenstein which presents a dramatic retelling of the Russian revolution in 1917 which marked the beginnings of the Soviet Union.
Strike	1925	A Soviet Union film by Sergei Eisenstein.
Battleship Potemkin	1925	A film by Sergei Eisenstein covering one of the formative events of the Russian revolution, the mutiny of a ship's crew against their officers.
