= List of Czech and Slovak films =

Lists of Czech and Slovak films include:

- List of Czechoslovak films, films made in Czechoslovakia, a state that existed 1918–1992
- Lists of Czech films, films made in Czech lands from 1898 to present
- List of Slovak films, films made in Slovak lands from 1897 to present
