= List of films about Krishna =

Krishna is a Hindu deity, an incarnation of Vishnu. Films about him include:

- Maya Bazar (1957) (Telugu and Tamil)
- Shri Krishna Leela (1971)
- Sri Krishna 2006, Telugu film
- Krishna (2006 film)
- Oh My God!, 2012 satirical film about Hindu deities
- Krishna Aur Kans (2012)
- Kalki 2898 AD (2024)
- Krishnavataram Part 1: The Heart (Hridayam) (2026)
