= List of films featuring the Salvation Army =

This is a list of films which feature the Salvation Army as the subject matter, or as a matter theme in the film.

== 1900s ==
=== 1900 ===
- Soldiers of the Cross

=== 1902 ===
- General Booth

=== 1903 ===
- The Chorus Girl and the Salvation Army

=== 1909 ===
- The Salvation Army Lass

== 1910s ==
=== 1915 ===
- Salvation Nell

=== 1916 ===
- A Gutter Magdalene
- Salvation Joan

=== 1917 ===
- Easy Street

=== 1919 ===
- The Belle of New York
- The Blue Bonnet
- Fires of Faith
- The Salvation Army On The Job
- Salvation Rose

== 1920s ==
=== 1920 ===
- Hell's Oasis

=== 1921 ===
- The Phantom Carriage ("Körlkaren")
- The Big Punch
- Salvation Nell

=== 1927 ===
- The Angel of Broadway
- Salvation Jane

=== 1928 ===
- You're Darn Tootin'
- Street of Sin

=== 1929 ===
- Pandora's Box

== 1930s ==
=== 1931 ===
- The Public Enemy
- Laughing Sinners
- Salvation Nell
- The Miracle Woman

=== 1933 ===
- She Done Him Wrong
- Heroes for Sale
- Midnight Mary

=== 1935 ===
- The 39 Steps

=== 1936 ===
- San Francisco

== 1940s ==
=== 1941 ===
- Major Barbara
- Sullivan's Travels

=== 1942 ===
- Larceny, Inc.

=== 1943 ===
- The Youngest Profession

=== 1946 ===
- The Dark Corner

=== 1948 ===
- The Time of Your Life
- Good Sam

== 1950s ==
=== 1951 ===
- A Place in the Sun
- On Moonlight Bay

=== 1952 ===
- The Belle of New York

=== 1955 ===
- Guys and Dolls
- The Cockleshell Heroes

=== 1956 ===
- The Man Who Never Was

== 1960s ==
=== 1961 ===
- The Long and the Short and the Tall
- Whistle Down the Wind

=== 1962 ===
- The Spiral Road

=== 1963 ===
- Heavens Above!

=== 1966 ===
- The Wrong Box
- Penelope

=== 1968 ===
- Run, Man, Run!

== 1970s ==
=== 1972 ===
- Frenzy

=== 1973 ===
- O Lucky Man!

=== 1975 ===
- Three Days of the Condor

=== 1976 ===
- The House on Straw Hill

=== 1977 ===
- High Anxiety

=== 1978 ===
- Hot Lead and Cold Feet

== 1980s ==
=== 1983 ===
- Trading Places - a small scene of people giving them donations in the opening credits
- A Christmas Story

=== 1985 ===
- Brazil

=== 1988 ===
- Judgment in Berlin

=== 1989 ===
- Born on the Fourth of July

== 1990s ==
=== 1993 ===
- Excessive Force

=== 1994 ===
- The Sum of Us

=== 1996 ===
- Sleepers

=== 1998 ===
- The Book of Life

== 2000s ==
=== 2000 ===
- Joe the Turk
- The William Booth Story

=== 2002 ===
- Mies vailla menneisyyttä

=== 2007 ===
- Fred Claus

=== 2013 ===
- Silver Bells

=== 2015 ===
- Do You Believe?

== Publications ==
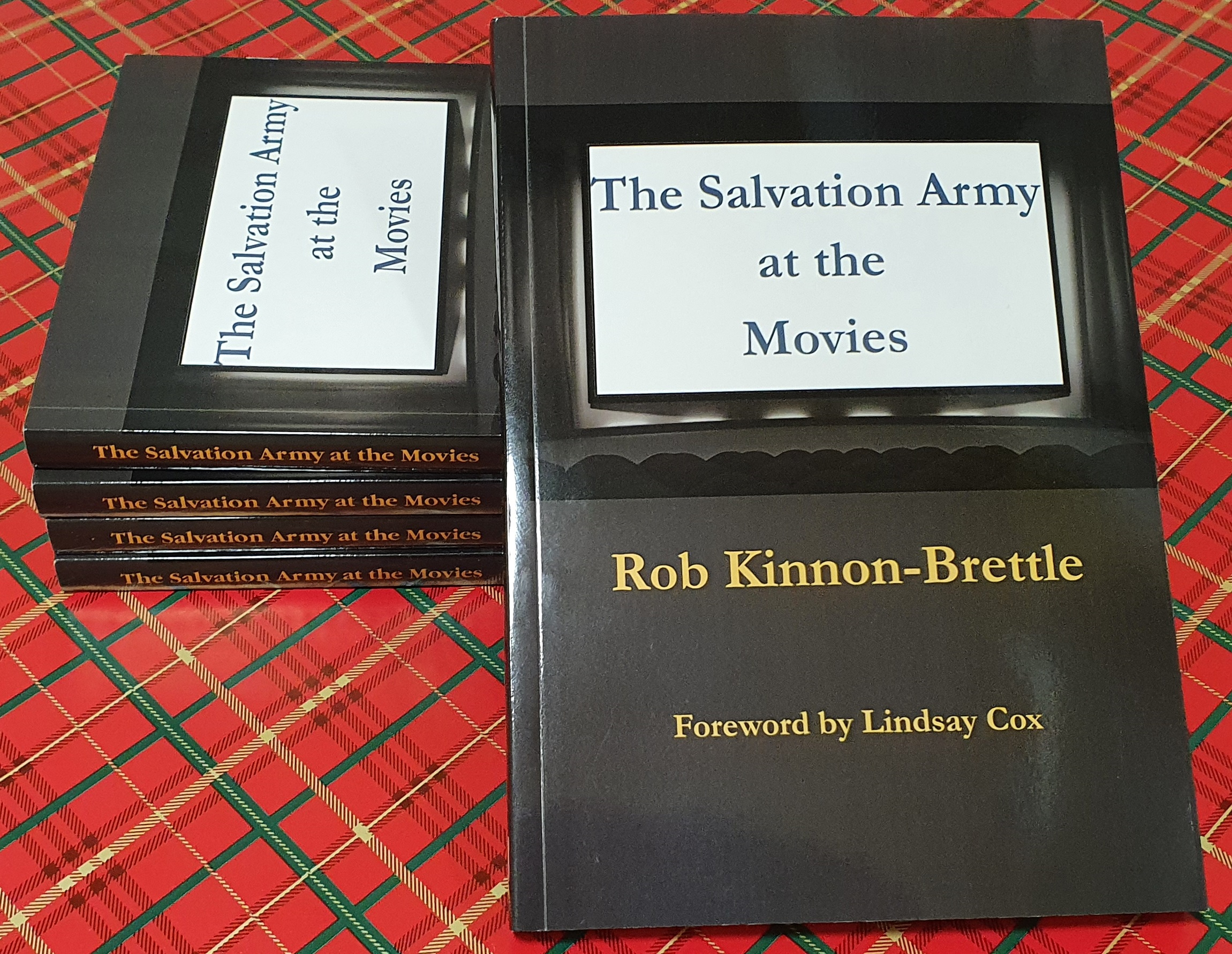
The Salvation Army at the Movies book

A book was published by Kinnon Publishing in 2020 which listed all these films and many more - over 520 films with portrayals of the Salvation Army - called The Salvation Army at the Movies.

- The Salvation Army at the Movies, Kinnon Publishing, 2020, ISBN 978-1-8382228-0-2

Other books on the subject include:

- The Salvation Army and the Cinematograph 1897-1929 - A Religious Tapestry in Britain and India, Local History Publications, 2015, ISBN 978-1-910722-00-8
