= List of films made with Autodesk 3ds Max =

3D films

The following is a list of major films which used Autodesk 3ds Max software, or one of its previous versions, in some of the visual effects shots:

- 2012
- 300
- A Fairly Odd Movie: Grow Up, Timmy Turner!
- A Fairly Odd Christmas
- A Mushsnail Tale
- Astro Boy
- Alice in Wonderland
- Alvin and the Chipmunks
- Alvin and the Chipmunks: The Squeakquel
- Alvin and the Chipmunks: Chipwrecked
- Alvin and the Chipmunks: The Road Chip
- Aliens in the Attic
- Appleseed Ex Machina
- Atagoul
- Avatar
- A Bug's Life
- Battlefield Earth
- Belle
- Beowulf
- Black Hawk Down
- Black Swan
- Blade
- Blade II
- Blade: Trinity
- Cloudy with a Chance of Meatballs
- Casper
- Cars
- Cats & Dogs
- Charlie's Angels
- Charlie's Angels: Full Throttle
- Cloverfield
- Charlotte's Web
- Devilman
- Die Another Day
- Digimon: The Movie
- Digimon Adventure
- Digimon Adventure: Last Evolution Kizuna
- Digimon Adventure: Our War Game!
- Digimon Adventure tri.
- Digimon Adventure 02: The Beginning
- Digimon Frontier: Island of Lost Digimon
- Digimon Tamers: Battle of Adventurers
- Digimon Tamers: Runaway Locomon
- Digital Monster X-Evolution
- Dragon Wars
- Dr. Dolittle
- Dr. Dolittle 2
- Donner
- Doom
- Driven
- Eight Crazy Nights
- Elf
- Fantastic Four
- Fantastic Four: Rise of the Silver Surfer
- Final Destination
- Final Destination 2
- Final Destination 3
- The Final Destination
- Final Destination 5
- Finding Nemo
- The Fifth Element
- Gantz
- Gantz: O
- Garfield: The Movie
- Garfield: A Tail of Two Kitties
- Garo: Divine Flame
- Garo: The Fleeting Cherry Blossom
- Garo: Gold Storm Sho
- Garo: Kami no Kiba
- Garo: Red Requiem
- Garo: Soukoku no Maryu
- Garo: Taiga
- Garo Gaiden: Tōgen no Fue
- Gekijōban Idolish7 Live 4bit Beyond the Period
- A Good Day to Die Hard
- Gulliver's Travels
- Ghost in the Shell 2: Innocence
- G.I. Joe: The Rise of Cobra
- Granny O'Grimm's Sleeping Beauty
- Harry Potter and the Deathly Hallows – Part 1
- Harry Potter and the Deathly Hallows – Part 2
- Hellboy
- Hellboy II: The Golden Army
- Help! I'm a Fish
- Hereafter
- House of Flying Daggers
- Hugo
- I, Robot
- Ice Age
- Ice Age: The Meltdown
- Ice Age: Dawn of the Dinosaurs
- Iron Man
- Journey to the Center of the Earth (2008)
- Johnny Mnemonic
- Jurassic Park
- Jurassic World
- K-19: The Widowmaker
- Kiba Gaiden
- Lara Croft: Tomb Raider
- Lara Croft Tomb Raider: The Cradle of Life
- Last Knights
- The Triplets of Belleville (Les Triplettes de Belleville)
- The Little Boats
- The Little Cars
- The Little Panda Fighter
- Little Bee
- Live Free or Die Hard
- Lost in Space
- Mad Max: Fury Road
- Majestic Prince: Genetic Awakening
- Marmaduke
- The Mask
- Max Payne
- Mickey's Twice Upon a Christmas
- Mighty Joe Young
- Minority Report
- Monster Strike the Movie: Sora no Kanata
- Monsters, Inc.
- Mission: Impossible II
- Mission: Impossible III
- Mission: Impossible – Ghost Protocol
- Mr. & Mrs. Smith
- Neppu Kairiku Bushi Road
- New Initial D the Movie
- Open Season
- Paycheck
- Pokémon: The First Movie
- Pokémon the Movie 2000
- Pokémon 3: The Movie
- Pokémon 4Ever
- Pokémon Heroes
- Planet of the Apes
- Priest (2011)
- Ratatoing
- Ratatouille
- Reign of Fire
- Resident Evil
- Resident Evil: Apocalypse
- Resident Evil: Extinction
- Resident Evil: Afterlife
- Resident Evil: Damnation
- Resident Evil: Death Island
- Resident Evil: Degeneration
- Resident Evil: Vendetta
- Surf's Up
- Saw
- Saw II
- Saw III
- Saw IV
- Saw V
- Saw VI
- Saw 3D
- Scarlet
- Scooby-Doo
- Scooby-Doo 2: Monsters Unleashed
- Seven Swords
- Silent Hill
- Sin City
- Sindy the Fairy Princess
- Shutter Island
- Sky Captain and the World of Tomorrow
- Son of the Mask
- Soul Snatcher
- Speed
- Spider-Man
- Spider-Man 2
- Spider-Man 3
- Steamboy
- Star Wars: Episode II – Attack of the Clones
- Star Wars: Episode III – Revenge of the Sith
- Sucker Punch
- Summer Wars
- Super 8
- Swordfish
- Ted
- Ted 2
- Terkel in Trouble
- Titanic
- Tinker Bell
- Tinker Bell and the Lost Treasure
- Tinker Bell and the Great Fairy Rescue
- The Cathedral
- The Craft
- The Core
- The Curious Case of Benjamin Button
- The Day After Tomorrow
- The Girl Who Leapt Through Time
- The Green Mile
- The Hurt Locker
- The Incredibles
- The Italian Job
- The Lost World: Jurassic Park
- The Last Samurai
- The Little Panda Fighter
- The Little Polar Bear
- The Little Polar Bear 2: The Mysterious Island
- The Littlest Light on the Christmas Tree
- The Majestic
- The Magic Roundabout
- The Matrix
- The Matrix Reloaded
- The Matrix Revolutions
- The Mummy
- The Mummy Returns
- The Polar Express
- The Smurfs
- The Sky Crawlers
- TMNT
- Tokyo Ghoul
- Tokyo Ghoul S
- Toy Story
- Toy Story 2
- Toy Story 3
- The Thirteenth Floor
- The Truman Show
- This Way Up
- Traumschiff Surprise - Periode 1
- Transformers
- Transformers: Revenge of the Fallen
- Transformers: Dark of the Moon
- Tron: Legacy
- Tugger: The Jeep 4x4 Who Wanted to Fly
- Up
- Watchmen
- WALL-E
- X-Men
- X-Men 2
- X-Men: The Last Stand
- X-Men Origins: Wolverine
- X-Men: First Class
- Yona Yona Penguin
- Your Name
- Zathura: A Space Adventure
