= List of films with plots centered on video games =

The following is a list of feature films centered around video games. This does not necessarily include video game adaptation.

== 1980s ==
=== 1982 ===
Title	Direction	plot
Tron	Steven Lisberger	Kevin Flynn, an arcade game designer, gets sucked into the video game world he created and has to fight his way back to the real world.

=== 1983 ===
Title	Direction	plot
Nightmares	Joseph Sargent	The segment "Bishop of Battle" stars Emilio Estevez as a video game wizard who breaks into the arcade at night to get to the 13th level, in doing so he becomes part of the game.
WarGames	John Badham	Computer hacker breaks into military intelligence computer to play games, which almost starts a thermonuclear war.
Joysticks	Greydon Clark	When a top local businessman and his two bumbling nephews try to shut down the town's only video arcade, arcade employees and patrons fight back.

=== 1984 ===
Title	Direction	plot
Cloak & Dagger	Richard Franklin	A young boy has secret plans given to him in the form of a video game cartridge, which he must protect from spies.
The Last Starfighter	Nick Castle	A boy, who is very good at a video game in his trailer park, finds himself recruited to be a pilot for an alien defense force just like the game he plays.

=== 1985 ===
Title	Direction	plot
The Dungeonmaster	Charles Band and Ted Nicolaou	A computer whiz is drawn into a series of realistic simulations by a demonic wizard who considers him a worthy adversary. Armed with his wrist-mounted X-CaliBR8 computer, he must solve the puzzles and rescue his girlfriend.

=== 1986 ===
Title	Direction	plot
Hollywood Zap!	David Cohen	A bored clerk decides to quit his job and travel to Hollywood, California to fulfill his dreams and to find his missing father. He chooses a hustler as his traveling companion, but both of them experience disillusionment during their quest.

=== 1988 ===
Title	Direction	plot
Kung Fu Master	Agnès Varda	A love story between a 40-year-old woman (Jane Birkin) and a 15-year-old boy addicted to the arcade game Kung-Fu Master.

=== 1989 ===
Title	Direction	plot
The Wizard	Todd Holland	A boy with mental problems decides to run away to compete in a video game contest and his brother helps him hitchhike to the tournament. Features numerous NES video games, primarily Super Mario Bros. 3 before its American release.

== 1990s ==
=== 1992 ===
Title	Direction	plot
The Lawnmower Man	Brett Leonard	A mentally handicapped man is turned into a genius through the application of computer science and virtual reality.

=== 1993 ===
Title	Direction	plot
Arcade	Albert Pyun	A teenager has to battle inside of a deadly virtual reality video game, in order to save her friends.

=== 1994 ===
Title	Direction	plot
Brainscan	John Flynn	A teenager is sent a mysterious computer game that uses hypnosis to make the game the most horrifying experience imaginable. He stops playing, only to find evidence that the murders depicted in the game actually happened.

=== 1997 ===
Title	Direction	plot
Nirvana	Gabriele Salvatores	A computer game designer finds that his latest video game has a virus which has given consciousness to the main character of the game, Solo.

=== 1999 ===
Title	Direction	plot
EXistenZ	David Cronenberg	A game designer finds herself targeted by assassins while playing a virtual reality game of her own creation.

== 2000s ==
=== 2001 ===
Title	Direction	plot
How to Make a Monster	George Huang	An evil video game comes to life and hunts the group of developers.
Avalon	Mamoru Oshii	a war-themed, virtual reality MMO under the same title.

=== 2003 ===
Title	Direction	plot
Game Over	Jason Bourque	When a supercomputer is linked to a video game network, the computer programmer who designed the game must enter the virtual reality world of his fantasies and defeat the computer before it causes worldwide chaos.
Spy Kids 3-D: Game Over	Robert Rodriguez	Carmen Cortez is caught in a virtual reality game designed by their new nemesis, the Toymaker. Juni, her little brother, goes into the game to save her as well as beta players and the world.

=== 2004 ===
Title	Direction	plot
GameBox 1.0	David Hillenbrand & Scott Hillenbrand	A video game tester must fight to escape from a video game that has become all too real.
Satan's Little Helper	Jeff Lieberman.	A nine-year old gamer mistakes a costumed killer for a video game version of the Devil.

=== 2005 ===
Title	Direction	plot
Devour	David Winkler.	A college student is under the demonic influence of an online game.
Hellraiser VIII: Hellworld	Rick Bota	Features a MMORPG based on the Hellraiser mythology.

=== 2006 ===
Title	Direction	plot
Grandma's Boy	Nicholaus Goossen	A 35-year-old game tester develops a game in secret only to have someone at work try to steal it.
Stay Alive	William Brent Bell	Friends start dying just like they did in a video game they all played.

=== 2007 ===
Title	Direction	plot
Ben X	Nic Balthazar	Ben is an autistic boy obsessed with an MMORPG called ArchLord. He plays the game to escape being bullied and has one online friend named Scarlite. He considers suicide until he meets Scarlite in person.
Press Start	Ed Glaser	Average suburban youth Zack Nimbus is recruited by an ill-tempered ninja and a tough-as-nails space soldier to save the world from a tyrannical, but comically insecure, sorcerer. References to many classic video games.

=== 2008 ===
Title	Direction	plot
WarGames: The Dead Code	Stuart Gillard	manages to crack the government network, only to be found by the police and a mysterious man in an overcoat. The couple are chased by the police until they get lost in the subway system. They escape and meet the man in the overcoat who says he nearly started World War III.

=== 2009 ===
Title	Direction	plot
Gamer	Mark Neveldine and Brian Taylor	A man has to save humanity from being enslaved by an MMO.
Assault Girls	Mamoru Oshii	Three girls in an MMO team up to win a boss battle.

=== 2010 ===
Title	Direction	plot
Tron: Legacy	Joseph Kosinski	Kevin Flynn's son Sam finds his missing father in a new version of the virtual game world and has a similar journey as his father did fighting to get back to reality.
Black Heaven	Gilles Marchand	An innocent young man becomes enamored with a mysterious girl. He is lured into "Black Hole" – a dark, obscure video game world of avatars with deadly serious intentions in the real world.
RPG Metanoia	Luis C. Suárez.	Metanoia gets infected by a virus which affects the online world, and a young player goes on a journey to save the online world and prevent it from taking over the offline world.

== 2010s ==
=== 2011 ===
Title	Direction	plot
Best Player	Richard Amberg	
Ra.One		where a video game developer creates an unstoppable villain for his son which becomes all too real.

=== 2014 ===
Title	Direction	plot
Angry Video Game Nerd: The Movie	Kevin Finn, James Rolfe	The titular Angry Video Game Nerd, a YouTuber who reviews obsolete console and computer games. One that he won't revisit, however, is Atari's E.T. the Extra-Terrestrial The Nerd’s is approached by a gaming company representative to evaluate the new release Eee Tee 2. Fearful that the title will encourage his fans to seek out the original game, the Nerd agrees to review the game if the company will fund an expedition to debunk the urban myth concerning Atari video game burial.

=== 2019 ===
Title	Direction	Plot
Brave Father Online: Our Story of Final Fantasy XIV	Teruo Noguchi	Akio's father suddenly quits his job. Wanting to know the reason, but having generally no connection with his father, Iwamoto Akio eventually invites him into the world of online gaming through Final Fantasy XIV. Little does he know, his father has kept a secret from him.
