= List of films from Estonia =

A list of films produced in Estonia ordered by year of release. For an alphabetical list of Estonian films, see Category:Estonian films

- List of Estonian films before 1991
- List of Estonian films since 1991
- List of Estonian animated films
- List of Estonian war films

== See also ==
- List of Estonian submissions for the Academy Award for Best International Feature Film
