= List of VistaVision films =

The following is a list of films filmed using the VistaVision process for the majority of their runtime.

Films are live-action color features except where noted.

== Films shot in VistaVision ==
=== 1954–61: Original ===
Film	Year	Studio	Notes	Ref.
Paramount Presents VistaVision	1954	Paramount	19-minute promo film	
VistaVision Visits Norway	1954	Paramount	Short film	
White Christmas	1954	Paramount	First VistaVision release	
3 Ring Circus	1954	Paramount		
An Alligator Named Daisy	1955	Rank		
Artists and Models	1955	Paramount		
The Desperate Hours	1955	Paramount	First B&W film shot in VistaVision	
Doctor at Sea	1955	Rank		
The Far Horizons	1955	Paramount		
The Girl Rush	1955	Paramount		
Hell's Island	1955	Paramount		
Lucy Gallant	1955	Paramount		
Richard III	1955	London Films		
The Rose Tattoo	1955	Paramount	Black & white	
Run for Cover	1955	Paramount		
The Seven Little Foys	1955	Paramount		
Simon and Laura	1955	Rank		
Strategic Air Command	1955	Paramount		
To Catch a Thief	1955	Paramount		
The Trouble with Harry	1955	Paramount		
VistaVision Visits Hawaii	1955	Paramount	Short film	
VistaVision Visits Japan	1955	Paramount	Short film	
VistaVision Visits Mexico	1955	Paramount	Short film	
VistaVision Visits Spain	1955	Paramount	Short film	
VistaVision Visits Sun Trails	1955	Paramount	Short film	
We're No Angels	1955	Paramount		
You're Never Too Young	1955	Paramount		
Anything Goes	1956	Paramount		
The Battle of the River Plate	1956	Rank		
The Birds and the Bees	1956	Paramount		
The Black Tent	1956	Rank		
The Court Jester	1956	Paramount		
Away All Boats	1956	Universal Pictures		
High Society	1956	Metro-Goldwyn-Mayer		
House of Secrets	1956	Rank		
The Searchers	1956	Warner Bros.		
Hollywood or Bust	1956	Paramount		
The Leather Saint	1956	Paramount	Black & white	
The Man Who Knew Too Much	1956	Paramount		
The Mountain	1956	Paramount		
Pardners	1956	Paramount		
The Proud and Profane	1956	Paramount	Black & white	
The Rainmaker	1956	Paramount		
The Scarlet Hour	1956	Paramount	Black & white	
The Search for Bridey Murphy	1956	Paramount	Black & white	
The Spanish Gardener	1956	Rank		
The Ten Commandments	1956	Paramount		
That Certain Feeling	1956	Paramount		
Three Violent People	1956	Paramount		
The Vagabond King	1956	Paramount		
VistaVision Visits Austria	1956	Paramount	Short film	
VistaVision Visits Gibralter	1956	Paramount	Short film	
VistaVision Visits Panama	1956	Paramount	Short film	
War and Peace	1956	Paramount		
Beau James	1957	Paramount		
The Buster Keaton Story	1957	Paramount	Black & white	
The Pride and the Passion	1957	United Artists		
The Delicate Delinquent	1957	Paramount	Black & white	
The Devil's Hairpin	1957	Paramount		
Doctor at Large	1957	Rank		
Fear Strikes Out	1957	Paramount	Black & white	
Funny Face	1957	Paramount		
Gunfight at the O.K. Corral	1957	Paramount		
Hear Me Good	1957	Paramount	Black & white	
Hell Drivers	1957	Rank	Black & white	
Ill Met by Moonlight	1957	Rank	Black & white	
The Joker Is Wild	1957	Paramount	Black & white	
The Lonely Man	1957	Paramount	Black & white	
Loving You	1957	Paramount		
Omar Khayyam	1957	Paramount		
The Sad Sack	1957	Paramount	Black & white	
Short Cut to Hell	1957	Paramount	Black & white	
Spanish Affair	1957	Paramount		
The Tin Star	1957	Paramount	Black & white	
Wild Is the Wind	1957	Paramount	Black & white	
Williamsburg: The Story of a Patriot	1957	Paramount	Short produced for Colonial Williamsburg	
Another Time, Another Place	1958	Paramount	Black & white	
The Big Money	1958	Rank		
The Black Orchid	1958	Paramount	Black & white	
The Buccaneer	1958	Paramount		
Desire Under the Elms	1958	Paramount	Black & white	
The Geisha Boy	1958	Paramount		
Hot Spell	1958	Paramount	Black & white	
Houseboat	1958	Paramount		
King Creole	1958	Paramount	Black & white	
Maracaibo	1958	Paramount		
The Matchmaker	1958	Paramount	Black & white	
Rock-a-Bye Baby	1958	Paramount		
St. Louis Blues	1958	Paramount	Black & white	
Teacher's Pet	1958	Paramount	Black & white	
Vertigo	1958	Paramount		
But Not for Me	1959	Paramount	Black & white	
The Five Pennies	1959	Paramount		
The Jayhawkers!	1959	Paramount		
Last Train from Gun Hill	1959	Paramount		
Li'l Abner	1959	Paramount		
North by Northwest	1959	Metro-Goldwyn-Mayer		
That Kind of Woman	1959	Paramount	Black & white	
The Trap	1959	Paramount		
Heller in Pink Tights	1960	Paramount		
It Started in Naples	1960	Paramount		
One-Eyed Jacks	1961	Paramount	Last classic Hollywood VistaVision release	

=== 2024–present: Revival ===
Film	Year	Studio	Notes	Ref.
The Brutalist	2024	A24	Selected portions and wide shots filmed with Beaucam	
One Battle After Another	2025	Warner Bros. Pictures	Beaucam used as primary camera for “somewhere between 70 and 80 percent” of the film	
Bugonia	2025	Focus Features	Wilcam and Beaucam used as primary cameras; “shot 95 percent” on VistaVision	
Digger	2026	Warner Bros. Pictures	Beaucam used for select sequences	
Remain	2027	Warner Bros. Pictures	Beaucam used for select sequences	

== Other films using VistaVision ==
Starting with Industrial Light and Magic's pioneering work on the original Star Wars in the 1970s, many films have used the VistaVision format to shoot higher quality source elements for use in visual effects compositing, particularly prior to the early 21st century, when digital workflows reached a high enough quality level to render many of the perceived advantages moot by many VFX companies. Aside from its use in visual effects, some films have used VistaVision as additional cameras for specific scenes or background shots. Between the 1960s and the 2020s, however, it was never used as a primary camera for principal photography, mainly due to noise considerations.

- Star Wars (1977)
- Lupin the 3rd: The Mystery of Mamo (1978)
- Star Trek: The Motion Picture (1979)
- The Empire Strikes Back (1980)
- Caveman (1981)
- The Fox and the Hound (1981)
- Tron (1982)
- Star Trek II: The Wrath of Khan (1982)
- Return of the Jedi (1983)
- The NeverEnding Story (1984)
- Back to the Future (1985)
- Aliens (1986)
- RoboCop (1987)
- Moonwalker (1988)
- Who Framed Roger Rabbit (1988) (approximately 80 percent of the entire movie shot on Vistavision)
- Back to the Future Part II (1989)
- The Abyss (1989)
- Indiana Jones and the Last Crusade (1989)
- Back to the Future Part III (1990)
- Die Hard 2 (1990)
- Dances with Wolves (1990)
- Newsies (1992)
- Jurassic Park (1993)
- Speed (1994)
- Forrest Gump (1994)
- True Lies (1994)
- Apollo 13 (1995)
- Jumanji (1995)
- The Indian in the Cupboard (1995)
- Twister (1996)
- The Lost World: Jurassic Park (1997)
- Contact (1997)
- Men in Black (1997)
- Meet Joe Black (1998)
- Gladiator (2000)
- The Perfect Storm (2000)
- Pearl Harbor (2001)
- The Mummy Returns (2001)
- Jurassic Park III (2001)
- Spider-Man (2002)
- Men in Black II (2002)
- A Tale of Two Sisters (2003)
- Spider-Man 2 (2004)
- Herbie: Fully Loaded (2005)
- Flightplan (2005)
- Spider-Man 3 (2007)
- The Dark Knight (2008)
- Blindness (2008)
- Inception (2010)
- Scott Pilgrim vs. the World (2010)
- Harry Potter and the Deathly Hallows – Part 1 (2010)
- Harry Potter and the Deathly Hallows – Part 2 (2011)
- The Dark Knight Rises (2012)
- Captain Phillips (2013)
- Interstellar (2014)
- Spectre (2015)
- First Man (2018)
- Tenet (2020) - used for cockpit interior shot during crash
- Jurassic World Dominion (2022)
- White Noise (2022)
- Poor Things (2023) - used for re-animation scene
- Chapter 51 (2025)
- Wuthering Heights (2026)
- Sabrina Carpenter - "House Tour" music video (2026)
- Mascotland (TBA)

== See also ==
- List of Technirama films
