= List of films about philosophers =

This is a list of feature films that include philosophers, or in which philosophers play a significant role.

== Biographical films ==
Biographical films based on real-life philosophers:

- Adi Shankaracharya (1983) – The life of Adi Shankaracharya, played by Sarvadaman D. Banerjee.
- Augustine of Hippo (1972), played by Dary Berkani, a Roberto Rossellini film.
- Agora (2009) – The life of Hypatia, played by Rachel Weisz.
- Beyond Good and Evil (1977) – About the love triangle between Friedrich Nietzsche, Paul Rée and a young Russian intellectual.
- Blaise Pascal (1972) – The life of Blaise Pascal, played by Pierre Arditi, a Roberto Rossellini film.
- Cartesius (1973) - The life of René Descartes, played by Ugo Cardea, a Roberto Rossellini film.
- Confucius (2010) – The life of Confucius, played by Chow Yun-fat.
- Days of Nietzsche in Turin (2001) – About Nietzsche's time in Turin.
- The Death of Empedocles (1987) – About the pre-Socratic philosopher Empedocles, directed by Danièle Huillet and Jean-Marie Straub.
- Destiny (1997) – The life of Averroes, played by Nour El-Sherif.
- Giordano Bruno (1973) – The life of Giordano Bruno, played by Gian Maria Volonté.
- Hannah Arendt (2012) – The life of Hannah Arendt, played by Barbara Sukowa.
- Socrates (1971) – The life of Socrates, played by Jean Sylvère, a Roberto Rossellini film.
- The Young Karl Marx (2017) – Karl Marx played by August Diehl.
- Trial and Death of Socrates (1939), Socrates played by Ermete Zacconi, directed by Corrado D'Errico.
- Wittgenstein (1993) – The life of Ludwig Wittgenstein, directed by Derek Jarman.

== Documentaries about philosophers ==
Feature documentary films about real philosophers:

- Der Zauberer von Meßkirch (1989) – a documentary about Martin Heidegger
- Derrida (2002) – A documentary about Jacques Derrida
- The Ister (2004) – a documentary about Martin Heidegger
- Zizek! (2005) – A film following a speaking tour by Slavoj Žižek
- Examined Life (2008) – Follows several contemporary philosophers as they try to apply their thought in practice
- The Pervert's Guide to Cinema (2006) – A film critique of several well-known works by Slavoj Žižek
- Being in the World (2010) – a documentary about Martin Heidegger
- Badiou (2018) – a film on the life of Alain Badiou

== Starring philosophers ==
Films where one or more philosophers play the main role, but that are not otherwise about philosophy:

- Irrational Man (2015) – A philosophy professor (Joaquin Phoenix) finds himself in an existential crisis, but eventually discovers a new purpose in life.
- The Life of David Gale (2003) – A philosophy professor (Kevin Spacey), and longtime activist against capital punishment, is sentenced to death for killing a fellow capital punishment abolitionist.
- L'Avenir (2016) – Middle-aged philosophy professor Nathalie Chazeaux's (Isabelle Huppert) life is going through a series of separations.
- Late Marriage (2001) - Zaza (Lior Ashkenazi) is a 31-year-old Georgian-Israeli PhD student, studying the philosophy of religion at Tel Aviv University, whose family is trying to arrange a marriage for him within the Georgian community against his will.

== Featuring philosophers ==
Films where one or more of the members of the main cast are philosophers:

- Alexander (2004) – Based on the life of Alexander the Great, who is mentored by Aristotle (Christopher Plummer).
- The Fall of the Roman Empire (1964) Features Roman emperor and stoic philosopher Marcus Aurelius (Alec Guinness) during the first segment of the film.
- Gladiator (2000) – The Roman general Maximus is betrayed when Commodus, the ambitious son of Emperor Marcus Aurelius (Richard Harris), murders his father and seizes the throne.
- The Oxford Murders (2008) – A student (Elijah Wood) finds out about mysterious killings in Oxford and helped by a philosopher of mathematics (John Hurt), they reveal the patterns used by the killer.
- When Nietzsche Wept (2007) – A Viennese doctor named Josef Breuer (Ben Cross) meets with Friedrich Nietzsche (Armand Assante) to help him deal with his despair

== About philosophy ==
Films where philosophy is central to the plot:

- I Heart Huckabees (2004) – A comedy with existential themes.
- Mindwalk (1990) – A wide-ranging discussion between three individuals.
- My Dinner with Andre (1981) – A film featuring philosophical discussions.
- My Night at Maud's (1969) – A film centred around philosophical discussions.
- Rope (1948) – A film about a Nietzsche-inspired experiment.
- Sophie's World (1999) – The story of a teenage girl (Silje Storstein) living in Norway, and a middle-aged philosopher (Tomas von Brömssen), who introduces her to philosophical thinking and the history of philosophy; based on a novel by Jostein Gaarder.
- The Fountainhead (1949) – Based on The Fountainhead by Ayn Rand.
- The Stranger (1967) – Based on The Stranger by Albert Camus.
- Waking Life (2001) – The film explores the nature of reality, dreams, consciousness, the meaning of life, free will, and existentialism.
