= List of NBC Saturday Night at the Movies titles =

This is a chronological listing of the titles that were showcased on the first four seasons of NBC Saturday Night at the Movies.

== Season 1 ==
The first 30-week season (1961–1962) consisted of post-1948 titles from 20th Century Fox. Those films in the widescreen CinemaScope format were resized for the small screen. In terms of content, very little editing was done because the films met the broadcast standards of the time for the most part. There were several weeks when the films ran far beyond the scheduled 11pm end time. The list of films in the "episode guide" come from the TV Listings page of the Lima News, Lima, Ohio.

Episode #	Airdate	Movie Title and Year	Main Cast	Network TV Run Time
1	9/23/1961	How to Marry a Millionaire (1953)	Betty Grable, Marilyn Monroe, Lauren Bacall	2 hours
2	9/30/1961	The Snows of Kilimanjaro (1952)	Gregory Peck, Susan Hayward, Ava Gardner	2 hours, 20 minutes
3	10/07/1961	Titanic (1953)	Clifton Webb, Barbara Stanwyck, Robert Wagner	2 hours
4	10/14/1961	Garden of Evil (1954)	Gary Cooper, Susan Hayward, Richard Widmark	2 hours
5	10/21/1961	The Desert Fox: The Story of Rommel (1951)	James Mason, Cedric Hardwicke, Jessica Tandy	2 hours
6	10/28/1961	There's No Business Like Show Business (1954)	Ethel Merman, Donald O'Connor, Marilyn Monroe	2 hours, 25 minutes
7	11/04/1961	Soldier of Fortune (1955)	Clark Gable, Susan Hayward, Michael Rennie	2 hours
8	11/11/1961	Halls of Montezuma (1951)	Richard Widmark, Jack Palance, Robert Wagner	2 hours, 20 minutes
9	11/18/1961	Demetrius and the Gladiators (1954)	Victor Mature, Susan Hayward, Michael Rennie	2 hours
10	11/25/1961	Dreamboat (1952)	Clifton Webb, Ginger Rogers, Anne Francis	2 hours
11	12/02/1961	Broken Arrow (1950)	James Stewart, Jeff Chandler, Debra Paget	2 hours
12	12/09/1961	Man on a Tightrope (1953)	Fredric March, Terry Moore, Gloria Grahame	2 hours
13	12/16/1961	Destination Gobi (1953)	Richard Widmark, Don Taylor, Max Showalter	2 hours
14	12/23/1961	O. Henry's Full House (1952)	John Steinbeck, Marilyn Monroe, Richard Widmark	2 hours, 25 minutes
15	12/30/1961	On the Riviera (1951)	Danny Kaye, Gene Tierney, Corinne Calvet	2 hours
16	1/06/1962	What Price Glory (1952)	James Cagney, Corinne Calvet, Robert Wagner	2 hours, 15 minutes
17	1/13/1962	People Will Talk (1951)	Cary Grant, Jeanne Crain, Hume Cronyn	2 hours, 15 minutes
18	1/20/1962	5 Fingers (1952)	James Mason, Danielle Darrieux, Michael Rennie	2 hours, 15 minutes
19	1/27/1962	Cheaper by the Dozen (1950)	Clifton Webb, Jeanne Crain, Myrna Loy	2 hours
20	2/03/1962	The Frogmen (1951)	Richard Widmark, Dana Andrews, Robert Wagner	2 hours
21	2/10/1962	With a Song in My Heart (1952)	Susan Hayward, Rory Calhoun, Robert Wagner	2 hours, 20 minutes
22	2/17/1962	Monkey Business (1952)	Cary Grant, Ginger Rogers, Marilyn Monroe	2 hours
23	2/24/1962	Stars and Stripes Forever (1952)	Clifton Webb, Debra Paget, Robert Wagner	2 hours
24	3/03/1962	The Day the Earth Stood Still (1951)	Michael Rennie, Patricia Neal, Sam Jaffe	2 hours
25	3/10/1962	The Black Rose (1950)	Tyrone Power, Orson Welles, Michael Rennie	2 hours, 15 minutes
26	3/17/1962	Where the Sidewalk Ends (1950)	Dana Andrews, Gene Tierney, Gary Merrill	2 hours
27	3/24/1962	No Highway in the Sky (1951)	James Stewart, Marlene Dietrich, Glynis Johns	2 hours
28	3/31/1962	Bird of Paradise (1951)	Debra Paget, Louis Jourdan, Jack Elam	2 hours
29	4/07/1962	It Happens Every Spring (1949)	Ray Milland, Jean Peters, Ed Begley	2 hours
30	4/14/1962	Diplomatic Courier (1952)	Tyrone Power, Patricia Neal, Karl Malden	2 hours

== Season 2 ==
The second season (1962–1963) began on September 22, 1962, just as the first season started off, with Marilyn Monroe, this time with the television debut of Gentlemen Prefer Blondes. The broadcast had become a special tribute to Monroe, who had died just a month earlier. It was also a second season of 30 titles from 20th Century Fox.

Episode #	Airdate	Movie Title and Year	Main Cast	Network TV Run Time
31	9/22/1962	Gentlemen Prefer Blondes (1953)	Jane Russell, Marilyn Monroe, Charles Coburn	2 hours
32	9/29/1962	Broken Lance (1954)	Spencer Tracy, Robert Wagner, Richard Widmark	2 hours
33	10/06/1962	The Egyptian (1954)	Jean Simmons, Victor Mature, Gene Tierney, Edmund Purdom	2 hours, 45 minutes
34	10/13/1962	Three Coins In The Fountain (1954)	Clifton Webb, Dorothy McGuire, Louis Jourdan	2 hours
35	10/20/1962	River of No Return (1954)	Robert Mitchum, Marilyn Monroe, Rory Calhoun	2 hours
36	10/27/1962	Mister Scoutmaster (1953)	Clifton Webb, Edmund Gwenn, Frances Dee	2 hours
37	11/03/1962	Beneath the 12-Mile Reef (1953)	Robert Wagner, Terry Moore, Richard Boone	2 hours
38	11/10/1962	The Desert Rats (1953)	Richard Burton, James Mason, Robert Newton	2 hours
39	11/17/1962	White Witch Doctor (1953)	Susan Hayward, Robert Mitchum, Walter Slezak	2 hours
40	11/24/1962	Sailor of the King (1953)	Jeffrey Hunter, Michael Rennie, Wendy Hiller	2 hours
41	12/01/1962	Night People (1954)	Gregory Peck, Broderick Crawford, Buddy Ebsen	2 hours
42	12/08/1962	No Down Payment (1957)	Joanne Woodward, Tony Randall, Jeffrey Hunter	2 hours, 5 minutes
43	12/15/1962	Désirée (1954)	Marlon Brando, Merle Oberon, Michael Rennie	2 hours, 10 minutes
44	12/22/1962	Red Skies of Montana (1952)	Richard Widmark, Jeffrey Hunter, Richard Boone	2 hours
45	12/29/1962	Rawhide (1951)	Tyrone Power, Susan Hayward, Jack Elam	2 hours
46	1/5/1963	Decision Before Dawn (1951)	Richard Basehart, Gary Merrill, Hildegard Neff	2 hours, 25 minutes
47	1/12/1963	The Sun Also Rises (1957)	Tyrone Power, Ava Gardner, Errol Flynn	2 hours, 35 minutes
48	1/19/1963	Woman's World (1954)	Van Heflin, Lauren Bacall, Clifton Webb	2 hours
49	1/26/1963	Deadline - U.S.A. (1952)	Humphrey Bogart, Kim Hunter, Ed Begley	2 hours
50	2/2/1963	Niagara (1953)	Marilyn Monroe, Joseph Cotten, Jean Peters	2 hours
51	2/9/1963	Kangaroo (1952)	Maureen O'Hara, Peter Lawford, Richard Boone	2 hours
52	2/16/1963	The Long Hot Summer (1958)	Paul Newman, Joanne Woodward, Orson Welles	2 hours, 15 minutes
53	2/23/1963	The President's Lady (1953)	Susan Hayward, Charlton Heston, John McIntire	2 hours
54	3/2/1963	The Roots of Heaven (1958)	Errol Flynn, Juliette Gréco, Eddie Albert	2 hours, 25 minutes
55	3/9/1963	In Love and War (1958)	Robert Wagner, Hope Lange, Jeffrey Hunter	2 hours, 10 minutes
56	3/16/1963	A Certain Smile (1958)	Rossano Brazzi, Joan Fontaine, Johnny Mathis	2 hours, 5 minutes
57	3/23/1963	Fraulein (1958)	Dana Wynter, Mel Ferrer, Theodore Bikel	2 hours
58	3/30/1963	Ten North Frederick (1958)	Gary Cooper, Geraldine Fitzgerald, Stuart Whitman	2 hours
59	4/6/1963	Night and the City (1950)	Richard Widmark, Gene Tierney, Herbert Lom	2 hours
60	4/13/1963	I'd Climb the Highest Mountain (1951)	Susan Hayward, Rory Calhoun, Gene Lockhart	2 hours

== Season 3 ==
The third season (1963-1964) began on September 21, 1963. For the third season in a row, the network opened its Saturday night movie series with a Marilyn Monroe-starring film, 1955's The Seven Year Itch. By this time, NBC had added a second movie night, Monday, to its prime-time schedule. A new package of films were acquired at a cost of $14 million to the network consisting of 42 titles from 20th Century Fox, as well as 35 post 1950 films from MGM to fill both nights. For the most part, heavy dramatic films, such as The Diary of Anne Frank (1959), were chosen for season three of Saturday Night at the Movies, while lighter fare, such as comedies and musicals, were reserved for the new series, Monday Night at the Movies.

Episode #	Airdate	Movie Title and Year	Main Cast	Network TV Run Time
61	9/21/1963	The Seven Year Itch (1955)	Marilyn Monroe, Tom Ewell, Evelyn Keyes	2 hours, 10 minutes
62	9/28/1963	The Journey (1959)	Yul Brynner, Deborah Kerr, Jason Robards	2 hours, 25 minutes
63	10/5/1963	Ask Any Girl (1959)	David Niven, Shirley MacLaine, Gig Young	2 hours
64	10/12/1963	The Asphalt Jungle (1950)	Sterling Hayden, Jean Hagen, Sam Jaffe	2 hours, 15 minutes
65	10/19/1963	The Tall Men (1955)	Clark Gable, Jane Russell, Cameron Mitchell	2 hours, 25 minutes
66	10/26/1963	Something of Value (1957)	Rock Hudson, Dana Wynter, Sidney Poitier	2 hours, 15 minutes
67	11/2/1963	Let's Make Love (1960)	Marilyn Monroe, Yves Montand, Tony Randall	2 hours, 20 minutes
68	11/9/1963	The Diary of Anne Frank (1959)	Millie Perkins, Joseph Schildkraut, Shelley Winters, Ed Wynn	3 hours, 20 minutes
69	11/16/1963	Untamed (1955)	Tyrone Power, Susan Hayward, Richard Egan	2 hours, 10 minutes
N/A	11/23/1963	Pre-empted due to continuing NBC News coverage of the assassination of President John F. Kennedy		
70	11/30/1963	Count Your Blessings (1959)	Deborah Kerr, Rossano Brazzi, Maurice Chevalier	2 hours
71	12/7/1963	The Left Hand of God (1955)	Humphrey Bogart, Gene Tierney, Lee J. Cobb	2 hours
72	12/14/1963	The Opposite Sex (1956)	June Allyson, Joan Collins, Leslie Nielsen	2 hours, 20 minutes
73	12/21/1963	A Man Called Peter (1955)	Richard Todd, Jean Peters, Les Tremayne	2 hours, 15 minutes
74	12/28/1963	The Secret Partner (1961)	Stewart Granger, Haya Harareet, Bernard Lee	2 hours
75	1/4/1964	Daddy Long Legs (1955)	Fred Astaire, Leslie Caron, Fred Clark	2 hours, 25 minutes
76	1/11/1964	Imitation General (1958) (Rescheduled from 11/23/1963)	Glenn Ford, Taina Elg, Red Buttons	2 hours
77	1/18/1964	The Naked Spur (1953)	James Stewart, Janet Leigh, Robert Ryan	2 hours
78	1/25/1964	Until They Sail (1957)	Jean Simmons, Paul Newman, Joan Fontaine	2 hours, 15 minutes
79	2/1/1964	Lust for Life (1956)	Kirk Douglas, Anthony Quinn, Pamela Brown	2 hours, 30 minutes
80	2/8/1964	The Band Wagon (1953)	Fred Astaire, Cyd Charisse, Oscar Levant	2 hours, 10 minutes
81	2/15/1964	Edge of the City (1957)	John Cassavetes, Sidney Poitier, Ruby Dee	2 hours
82	2/22/1964	The Story of Three Loves (1953)	Pier Angeli, Ethel Barrymore, Kirk Douglas	2 hours, 25 minutes
83	2/29/1964	Violent Saturday (1955)	Victor Mature, Sylvia Sidney, Lee Marvin	2 hours
84	3/7/1964	Rally 'Round the Flag, Boys! (1958)	Paul Newman, Joanne Woodward, Jack Carson	2 hours
85	3/14/1964	Black Widow (1954)	Ginger Rogers, Van Heflin, Gene Tierney	2 hours
86	3/21/1964	Man on Fire (1957)	Bing Crosby, Inger Stevens, E. G. Marshall	2 hours
87	3/28/1964	Wild River (1960)	Montgomery Clift, Lee Remick, Albert Salmi	2 hours, 15 minutes
88	4/4/1964	Fourteen Hours (1951)	Richard Basehart, Barbara Bel Geddes, Paul Douglas	2 hours
89	4/11/1964	The Vintage (1957)	Pier Angeli, Mel Ferrer, Theodore Bikel	2 hours
90	4/18/1964	The Girl in the Red Velvet Swing (1955)	Ray Milland, Joan Collins, Farley Granger	2 hours, 10 minutes

In the spring and summer of 1964, NBC elected to rebroadcast select titles previously seen on the Monday Night at the Movies series, in hopes of better ratings. The films seen for the first time on Saturday are listed below.

Episode #	Airdate	Movie Title and Year	Main Cast	Network TV Run Time
91	4/25/1964	The Reluctant Debutante (film) (1958) [Rebroadcast from 11/18/1963]	Rex Harrison, Sandra Dee, John Saxon	2 hours
92	5/9/1964	Executive Suite (1954) [Edited version, rebroadcast from 9/30/1963]	William Holden, June Allyson, Fredric March	2 hours
93	5/16/1964	Love Is a Many-Splendored Thing (1955) [rebroadcast from 9/16/1963]	William Holden, Jennifer Jones	2 hours
94	7/18/1964	The View from Pompey's Head (1955) [Rebroadcast from 3/16/1964]	Richard Egan (actor), Marjorie Rambeau, Dana Wynter	2 hours
95	8/8/1964	The Rains of Ranchipur (1955) [Rebroadcast from 1/14/1964]	Lana Turner, Richard Burton, Fred MacMurray	2 hours, 15 minutes
96	9/19/1964	The Mating Game (1959) [Rebroadcast from 10/21/1963]	Debbie Reynolds, Tony Randall, Paul Douglas (actor)	2 hours

== Season 4 ==
With 20th Century Fox no longer providing movies to NBC for the 1964-1965 season, the peacock network struck a new deal with Paramount Pictures for 31 high profile films from the 1950's, many of them in the widescreen VistaVision format, now re-sized for the small screen. They also acquired 29 more films from MGM, for a total of 60 titles over two nights, including the new Wednesday Night at the Movies, when the Monday Night at the Movies series was transferred by the network's programming executives to Wednesday nights. The 4th season premiere on October 3, 1964, was also the first Paramount Picture to debut on NBC: 1955's Strategic Air Command. This season also saw the TV Debut of White Christmas (1954). The film would become a Saturday Night Holiday tradition on NBC, well into the 1970's

Episode #	Airdate	Movie Title and Year	Main Cast	Network TV Run Time
97	10/3/1964	Strategic Air Command (1955)	James Stewart. June Allyson, Frank Lovejoy	2 hours, 20 minutes
98	10/10/1964	Escape from Fort Bravo (1953)	William Holden, Eleanor Parker, John Forsythe	2 hours
99	10/17/1964	Never So Few (1959)	Frank Sinatra, Gina Lollobrigida, Steve McQueen	2 hours, 30 minutes
100	10/24/1964	Last Train from Gun Hill (1959)	Kirk Douglas, Carolyn Jones, Anthony Quinn	2 hours
101	10/31/1964	The Teahouse of the August Moon (1956)	Marlon Brando, Glenn Ford, Machiko Kyō	2 hours, 30 minutes
102	11/7/1964	The Jayhawkers! (1959)	Jeff Chandler, Fess Parker, Nicole Maurey	2 hours
103	11/14/1964	Some Came Running (1958)	Frank Sinatra, Dean Martin, Shirley MacLaine	2 hours, 40 minutes
104	11/21/1964	Three Violent People (1957)	Charlton Heston, Anne Baxter, Gilbert Roland	2 hours
105	11/28/1964	Designing Woman (1957)	Gregory Peck, Lauren Bacall, Dolores Gray	2 hours, 20 minutes
106	12/5/1964	Bad Day at Black Rock (1955)	Spencer Tracy, Robert Ryan, Anne Francis	1 hour, 45 minutes
107	12/12/1964	War and Peace (1956)	Audrey Hepburn, Henry Fonda, Mel Ferrer	3 hours, 30 minutes
108	12/19/1964	White Christmas (1954)	Bing Crosby, Danny Kaye, Rosemary Clooney	2 hours, 25 minutes
109	12/26/1964	Adam's Rib (1949)	Spencer Tracy, Katharine Hepburn	2 hours
110	1/2/1965	The Last Hunt (1956)	Robert Taylor (American actor), Debra Paget, Stewart Granger	2 hours
111	1/9/1965	Just for You (1952)	Bing Crosby, Jane Wyman, Ethel Barrymore	2 hours
112	1/16/1965	The Swan (1956)	Grace Kelly, Alec Guinness, Agnes Moorehead	2 hours
113	1/23/1965	The Rainmaker (1956)	Burt Lancaster, Katharine Hepburn, Lloyd Bridges	2 hours and 30 minutes
114	2/6/1965	Don't Give Up the Ship (1959)	Jerry Lewis, Dina Merrill, Claude Akins	2 hours
115	2/13/1965	Betrayed (1954)	Clark Gable, Lana Turner, Victor Mature	2 hours, 15 minutes
116	2/20/1965	Les Girls (1957)	Gene Kelly, Mitzi Gaynor, Kay Kendall	2 hours, 15 minutes
117	2/27/1965	Riding High (1950)	Bing Crosby, Coleen Gray, Charles Bickford	2 hours, 15 minutes
118	3/6/1965	Battleground (1949)	Van Johnson, John Hodiak, Ricardo Montalbán	2 hours
119	3/13/1965	Li'l Abner (1959)	Peter Palmer, Leslie Parrish, Stubby Kaye	2 hours, 15 minutes
120	3/20/1965	The Caddy (1953)	Jerry Lewis, Dean Martin, Donna Reed	2 hours
121	3/27/1965	Trial (1955)	Glenn Ford, Dorothy McGuire, Arthur Kennedy	2 hours, 15 minutes
122	4/3/1965	Warpath (1951)	Edmond O'Brien, Polly Bergen, Forrest Tucker	2 hours
123	4/10/1965	Wild Is the Wind (1957)	Anna Magnani, Anthony Quinn, Anthony Franciosa	2 hours, 15 minutes
124	4/17/1965	Rhapsody (1954)	Elizabeth Taylor, Vittorio Gassman, John Ericson	2 hours, 15 minutes
125	4/24/1965	Annie Get Your Gun (1950)	Betty Hutton, Howard Keel, Louis Calhern	2 hours

As with the previous season, the network borrowed a handful of films from it second movie night series (Wednesday Night at the Movies in this case) to make their Saturday debut. These films are listed below.

Episode #	Airdate	Movie Title and Year	Main Cast	Network TV Run Time
126	5/1/1965	To Catch a Thief (1955) [Rebroadcast from 9/16/1964]	Cary Grant, Grace Kelly, Jessie Royce Landis	2 hours
127	5/8/1965	The Naked Jungle (1954) [Rebroadcast from 2/10/1965]	Charlton Heston, Eleanor Parker, Abraham Sofaer	2 hours
128	5/15/1965	The Rack (1956) [Rebroadcast from 11/25/1964]	Paul Newman, Anne Francis, Walter Pidgeon	2 hours
129	6/26/1965	Detective Story (1951) [Rebroadcast from 1/27/1965]	Kirk Douglas, Eleanor Parker, William Bendix	2 hours
130	7/3/1965	Atlantis, the Lost Continent (1961) [Rebroadcast from 12/23/1964]	Joyce Taylor, John Dall	2 hours
131	7/17/1965	But Not for Me (1959) [Rebroadcast from 10/28/1964]	Clark Gable, Carroll Baker, Lee J. Cobb	2 hours
132	8/7/1965	The Catered Affair (1956) [Rebroadcast from 3/10/1965]	Bette Davis, Ernest Borgnine, Debbie Reynolds	2 hours

In later seasons, films such as The Time Machine (MGM, 1960), Sunset Boulevard (Paramount, 1950), and Sorry, Wrong Number (Paramount, 1948), would occasionally be shown. All three made their television debuts on Saturday Night at the Movies.
