= List of short films based on video games =

The following is a list of short films based on video games.

== 1990s ==
=== 1998 ===
Title	Director/s	Original game publisher	Based on	Ref
Abe's Exoddus: The Movie	Lorne Lanning	Oddworld Inhabitants	Oddworld: Abe's Exoddus	

=== 1999 ===
Title	Director/s	Original game publisher	Based on	Ref
GTA 2 – The Movie	Alex De Rakoff and Jamie King	Rockstar Games		

== 2000s ==
=== 2004 ===
Title	Director/s	Original game publisher	Based on	Ref
Run the Gauntlet	Sean Mullens	Atari	Driver 3	
Grand Theft Auto: San Andreas the introduction	TBC	Rockstar Games	Grand Theft Auto: San Andreas	

=== 2007 ===
Title	Director/s	Original game publisher	Based on	Ref
Deep Dive	Tetsuya Nomura	Square Enix	Kingdom Hearts	
Halo Landfall	Neill Blomkamp	Microsoft	Halo	

=== 2008 ===
Title	Director/s	Original game publisher	Based on	Ref
Sonic night of the werehog	Takashi Nakashima	Sega	Sonic the Hedgehog	

=== 2009 ===
Title	Director/s	Original game publisher	Based on	Ref
Kijujud ayo	TBC	Capcom	Resident Evil	
Assassin's Creed: Lineage	Yves Simoneau	Ubisoft	Assassin's Creed	

== 2010s ==
=== 2010 ===
Title	Director/s	Original game publisher	Based on	Ref
The Man from Blackwater	John Hillcoat	Rockstar Games	Red Dead Redemption	
Dragon Ball: Plan to Eradicate the Super Saiyans	Yoshihiro Ueda	Bandai Namco Entertainment	DragonBall	

=== 2011 ===
Title	Director/s	Original game publisher	Based on	Ref
Find Makarov: Operation Kingfish	Jeff Chan	Activision	Call of Duty	
Assassin's Creed: Embers	Laurent Bernier and Ghislain Ouellet	Ubisoft	Assassin's Creed	

=== 2012 ===
Title	Director/s	Original game publisher	Based on	Ref
Ghost Recon: Alpha	François Alaux and Herve de Crecy	Ubisoft		
Tekken Tag Tournament 2	Vincent Gatinaud	Bandai Namco Entertainment	Tekken	

=== 2013 ===
Title	Director/s	Original game publisher	Based on	Ref
Modern Warfare: Sunrise	Guillermo de Oliveira and Javier Esteban Loring	Activision	Call Of Duty	

=== 2014 ===
Title	Director/s	Original game publisher	Based on	Ref
Expiration Date	John Cook and Robin Walker	VALVe	Team Fortress 2	
Shadow of Mordor	Sam Gorski and Niko Pueringer	Monolith Productions	Middle-earth: Shadow of Mordor	
Payday 2: Hoxton Breakout		Payday 2	Overkill Software	

=== 2016 ===
Title	Director/s	Original game publisher	Based on	Ref
Star Fox Zero the battle begins	Kyoji Asano	Nintendo	Star Fox Zero	

=== 2017 ===
Title	Director/s	Original game publisher	Based on	Ref
Ghost Recon Wildlands: War Within the Cartel	Avi Youabian	Ubisoft	Tom Clancy's Ghost Recon Wildlands	
The Light Candle		Blizzard Entertainment	Hearthstone	

=== 2018 ===
Title	Director/s	Original game publisher	Based on	Ref
Papers, Please: The Short Film	Nikita Ordynskiy	Lucas Pope	Papers, Please	
Far Cry 5: Inside Eden's Gate	Barry Battles	Ubisoft	Far Cry	
Carmen Sandiego: To Steal or Not to Steal	Jos Humphrey	Broderbund	Carmen Sandiego	

=== 2019 ===
Title	Director/s	Original game publisher	Based on	Ref
Conviction	Neill Blom and kampSam McGlynn	BioWare	Anthem	
PUBG - The Worst Player in the World	Ricky Mabe	Bluehole	PUBG: Battlegrounds	

=== 2020 ===
Title	Director/s	Original game publisher	Based on	Ref
The Division 2 - Warlords of New York	Olivier Lescot and Boddicker	Ubisoft	The Division 2	
