= List of films with overtures =

This is a chronological partial list of films which include a musical overture at the beginning, against a blank screen or still pictures. Not included are films where an overture is used to present the credits, or underscored scenes that are already part of the plot. Often, but not necessarily, these films also include an intermission with entr'acte, followed by exit music (after the credits).

This list documents the rise and fall of the Overture/Roadshow practice over film history.

Overtures were popular in 1950s and 1960s Hollywood musicals (particularly those of Rodgers and Hammerstein) but have become less common since. In many cases, these overtures have been cut from TV and video releases and can only be found on "restored" DVD, Blu-ray and Ultra HD Blu-ray versions, if at all.

== The "Golden Age" era ==
- Don Juan (1926) (Note: Don Juan is an early sound film, the first to use the Vitaphone sound-on-disc system, and opened with a series of shorts to display this. One of these was the New York Philharmonic, conducted by Henry Kimball Hadley, performing the Overture to "Tannhäuser".)
- Wings (1927)
- The Jazz Singer (1927)
- Warming Up (1928)
- Noah's Ark (1928)
- The Desert Song (1929)
- Show Boat (1929)
- The Hollywood Revue of 1929 (1929)
- Gold Diggers of Broadway (1929)
- Paris (1929)
- Sally (1929)
- The Show of Shows (1929)
- Hell's Angels (1930)
- No, No Nanette (1930)
- Mammy (1930)
- Viennese Nights (1930)
- One Hour With You (1932)
- King Kong (1933) (Note: Conflicting account surround the overture, with some saying it was created for the premiere at Grauman's Chinese Theatre while others claim that there was never an overture. The 2005 restoration (which restored the overture missing from all previous home media releases) is the same length as the version of the film which ran at Grauman's.)
- A Midsummer Night's Dream (1935)
- The Great Ziegfeld (1936)
- Marie Antoinette (1938)
- Gone with the Wind (1939)
- Citizen Kane (1941)
- For Whom the Bell Tolls (1943)
- This Is the Army (1943)
- Best Foot Forward (1943)
- The Song of Bernadette (1943)
- Since You Went Away (1944)
- Spellbound (1945)
- State Fair (1945)
- Duel in the Sun (1946)
- Samson and Delilah (1949)

== 1950–70 ==
- Quo Vadis (1951)
- This Is Cinerama (1952)
- How to Marry a Millionaire (1953)
- A Star is Born (1954)
- Three Coins in the Fountain (1954)
- Cinerama Holiday (1955)
- East of Eden (1955)
- Oklahoma! (1955)
- Helen of Troy (1956)
- Seven Wonders of the World (1956)
- The King and I (1956) (Note: The original version lacked an overture and intermission until a later reissue, when an overture and entr'acte were assembled from underscore music.)
- High Society (1956)
- The Ten Commandments (1956)
- Around the World in Eighty Days (1956)
- Island in the Sun (1957)
- Search for Paradise (1957)
- Raintree County (1957)
- South Pacific (1958)
- Windjammer (1958)
- South Seas Adventure (1958)
- The Diary of Anne Frank (1959)
- Porgy and Bess (1959)
- Ben-Hur (1959)
- Scent of Mystery (1960)
- Can-Can (1960)
- Spartacus (1960)
- The Alamo (1960)
- King of Kings (1961)
- West Side Story (1961)
- El Cid (1961)
- Judgment at Nuremberg (1961)
- The Wonderful World of the Brothers Grimm (1962)
- The Longest Day (1962)
- How The West Was Won (1962) (with chorus)
- Mutiny on the Bounty (1962)
- Billy Rose's Jumbo (1962)
- Lawrence of Arabia (1962)
- Mediterranean Holiday (1962)
- 55 Days at Peking (1963)
- The Balcony (film) (1963)
- Cleopatra (1963)
- It's a Mad, Mad, Mad, Mad World (1963)
- The Best of Cinerama (1963)
- The Fall of the Roman Empire (1964)
- The Unsinkable Molly Brown (1964)
- Cheyenne Autumn (1964)
- My Fair Lady (1964)
- The Greatest Story Ever Told (1965)
- The Hallelujah Trail (1965)
- The Great Race (1965) (with chorus)
- Those Magnificent Men in Their Flying Machines (1965)
- The Agony and the Ecstasy (1965)
- Battle of the Bulge (1965)
- Doctor Zhivago (1965)
- Cinerama's Russian Adventure (1966)
- Khartoum (1966)
- Hawaii (1966)
- Is Paris Burning? (1966)
- The Sand Pebbles (1966)
- Grand Prix (1966)
- Ulysses (1967)
- Thoroughly Modern Millie (1967)
- The Happiest Millionaire (1967)
- Far From the Madding Crowd (1967)
- Camelot (1967)
- Custer of the West (1967)
- Doctor Dolittle (1967)
- 2001: A Space Odyssey (1968)
- Star! (1968)
- Funny Girl (1968)
- Oliver! (1968)
- Finian’s Rainbow (1968)
- Ice Station Zebra (1968)
- The Lion in Winter (1968)
- The Shoes of the Fisherman (1968)
- Krakatoa, East of Java (1968)
- Where Eagles Dare (1968) (Note: Roadshow versions only)
- Sweet Charity (1969)
- Goodbye, Mr. Chips (1969)
- Darling Lili (1970)
- Song of Norway (1970)
- Scrooge (1970)
- Ryan's Daughter (1970)

== After 1970 ==
- Wild Rovers (1971)
- Mary, Queen of Scots (1971)
- The Cowboys (1972)
- Young Winston (1972)
- 1776 (1972) (Note: An overture and entr’acte were created for the LaserDisc release and included on the extended cut)
- Man of La Mancha (1972)
- Jeremiah Johnson (1972)
- Tom Sawyer (1973)
- A Night at Karlstein (1973)
- That's Entertainment! (1974)
- Huckleberry Finn (1974) (Note: Certain versions only)
- Barry Lyndon (1975)
- That's Entertainment, Part II (1976)
- Space Battleship Yamato (1977)
- Star Trek: The Motion Picture (1979)
- The Black Hole (1979)
- Heaven's Gate (1980)
- Reds (1981)
- The Right Stuff (1983)
- Greystoke: The Legend of Tarzan, Lord of the Apes (1984) (Note: Introduced in the 1992 LaserDisc extended edition.)
- The Nightmare Before Christmas (1993) (Note: Not included on physical media, digital or streaming releases of the film.)
- That's Entertainment! III (1994)
- Dancer in the Dark (2000)
- Kingdom of Heaven (2005) (Note: Only the director's cut features an overture.)
- Melancholia (2011)
- The Hateful Eight (2015)
- The Zone of Interest (2023)
