= List of films featuring flying cars =

This is a body of movies featuring flying cars (cars capable of flying as well as driving on the road).

Film	Year	Description
The '?' Motorist	1906	A couple in their car is escaping from the police and go to outer space.
The Absent-Minded Professor	1961	A professor and inventor who creates flubber (flying rubber) that helps his Model T Ford fly.
Fantômas Strikes Back	1965	Fantômas escapes in a jet-powered flying Citroën DS in the final scene.
Chitty Chitty Bang Bang	1968	A musical centered around widowed father, Caractacus Potts, his kids, and his wacky inventions, including a flying car.
The Man with the Golden Gun	1974	James Bond film where the villain, Scaramanga, escapes capture by attaching a wing and jet engine rig to his gold coloured AMC Hornet
Grease	1978	The film depicts the lives of greaser Danny Zuko (John Travolta) and Australian transfer student Sandy Olsson (Olivia Newton-John), who develop an attraction for each other during a summer romance.
Heavy Metal	1981	The title sequence story opens with a Space Shuttle orbiting the Earth. The bay doors open, releasing a 1960 Corvette. An astronaut seated in the car then begins descending through Earth's atmosphere, landing in a desert canyon.
Blade Runner	1982	Deckard is forced to resume his old job of as a Replicant Hunter.
Repo Man	1984	After being fired from his job, Los Angeles slacker and punk rocker Otto lands a gig working for an eccentric repossession agent named Bud. At first, Otto is reluctant to work as a repo man, but he grows to love the fast-paced job. After learning of a Chevy Malibu that has been given a $20,000 price tag, Otto embarks on a quest to find the car with the beautiful Leila, who claims the trunk's contents are otherworldly.
Back to the Future	1985	Marty McFly gets transported back in time when one of Doc Brown's experiments goes awry.
Spaceballs	1987	Mel Brooks' parody on the Star Wars franchise.
Back to the Future Part II	1989	Marty McFly and Doc Brown travel to 2015 where the DeLorean time machine is stolen, and history is altered.
The Fifth Element	1997	Korben Dallas aids a supreme and perfect being in order to save the Earth from destruction.
Taxi 2	2000	Daniel's white Peugeot 406 taxi flies in two scenes: first when it is dropped off at the airport, and again in the final scene, where it descends by parachute and then deploys airplane wings.
Harry Potter and the Chamber of Secrets	2002	The second installment of the Harry Potter franchise finds Harry investigating a possible hidden chamber at Hogwarts.
Cars	2006	Lightning McQueen daydreams about being sponsored by Dinoco and starring in films as a flying car that saves others. Some time later, in his nightmare, he sees his rival, Chick Hicks, who instead of McQueen received sponsorship from Dinoco, and Chick Hicks is the car that stars in movies as a flying car.
Cars 2	2011	Holley Shiftwell is a spy who is a car that can fly. In addition, Mater received rocket engines from spies, thanks to which he could fly with the help of a parachute.
Total Recall	2012	Factory worker Douglas Quaid begins to suspect he is a spy after getting a memory-implanted vacation.
Blade Runner 2049	2017	A new blade runner discovers a society-shattering secret.
F9	2021	Roman and Tej travel to Germany to recruit Sean Boswell, Twinkie, and Earl, who have been working on a "rocket car". Using the rocket car, Tej and Roman enter orbit and destroy the satellite, stopping the cipher. Tej and Roman reach the International Space Station and are safely returned to Earth.
