= List of English-language films with previous foreign-language film versions =

This list includes both English-language films that were based on previously released foreign-language films and those that were not based on any previous film, but merely share a common source material.

== Chinese ==
English-language film	Chinese-language film	Common source material (if any)
The Departed (2006)	Infernal Affairs (2002) (Cantonese)	
The Eye (2008)	The Eye (2002) (various languages: Cantonese / Mandarin)	
Tortilla Soup (2001)	Eat Drink Man Woman (1994) (Mandarin)	
The Wedding Banquet (2025)	The Wedding Banquet (1993) (Mandarin)	

== Czech ==
English-language film	Czech-language film	Common source material (if any)
Pickup (1951)	Hlídač č. 47 (1937)	The novel Guard No. 47 (Josef Kopta)

== Danish ==
English-language film	Danish-language film	Common source material (if any)
After the Wedding (2019)	Efter brylluppet (2006)	
Ambulance (2022)	Ambulance (2005)	
Blackbird (2019)	Stille hjerte (2014)	
Brothers (2009)	Brødre (2004)	
Catch That Kid (2004)	Klatretøsen (2002)	
The First Time (2009)	Kærlighed ved første hik (1999)	
The Guilty (2021)	The Guilty (2018)	
Nightwatch (1997)	Nattevagten (1994)	
The One and Only (2002)	Den eneste ene (1999)	
Pusher (2012)	Pusher (1996)	
The Silent Partner (1978)	Tænk på et tal (1969)	The novel Tænk på et tal (Anders Bodelsen)
Solstice (2008)	Midsommer (2003)	
Speak No Evil (2024)	Speak No Evil (2022)	

== Dutch ==
English-language film	Dutch-language film	Common source material (if any)
Blind Date (2007)	Blind Date (1996)	
The Dinner (2017)	Het Diner (2013)	The novel Het Diner (Herman Koch)
Down (2001)	De Lift (1983)	
Interview (2007)	Interview (2003)	
The Loft (2014)	Loft (2008)	
Memory (2022)	The Alzheimer Case (2003, Belgium)	The novel De zaak Alzheimer (Jef Geeraerts)
The Vanishing (1993)	Spoorloos (1988)	The novella Het Gouden Ei (Tim Krabbé)

== Filipino ==
English-language film	Tagalog-language film	Common source material (if any)
The Echo (2008)	Sigaw (2004)	

== French ==
English-language film	French-language film	Common source material (if any)
13 (2010)	13 Tzameti (2005)	
The 13th Letter (1951)	Le Corbeau (1943)	
Algiers (1938)	Pépé le Moko (1937)	The novel Pépé le Moko (Henri La Barthe)
Alibi (1942)	L'Alibi (1937)	
And God Created Woman (1988)	Et Dieu... créa la femme (1956)	
Angel of Mine (2019)	L'Empreinte de l'ange (2008)	
The Big Wedding (2013)	Mon frère se marie (2006)	
A Bigger Splash (2015)	La piscine (1969)	
The Birdcage (1996)	La Cage aux Folles (1978)	The play La Cage aux Folles (Jean Poiret)
Black Eyes (1939)	Les yeux noirs (1935)	
Blame It on Rio (1984)	Un moment d'égarement (1977)	
Blood Ties (2013)	Les Liens du sang (2008)	The autobiographical novel Deux frères: flic & truand (Bruno Papet, Michel Papet)
The Blue Veil (1951)	Le voile bleu (1942)	
Break the News (1938)	Le mort en fuite (1936)	
Breathless (1983)	À bout de souffle (1960)	
Brick Mansions (2014)	Banlieue 13 (2004)	
Bring On the Girls (1945)	L'Homme qui cherche la vérité (1940)	
Buddy Buddy (1981)	L'emmerdeur (1973)	The play Le contrat (Francis Veber)
Casbah (1948)	Pépé le Moko (1937)	The novel Pépé le Moko (Henri La Barthe)
Chloe (2009)	Nathalie... (2003)	
CODA (2021)	La Famille Bélier (2014)	
Cousins (1989)	Cousin Cousine (1975)	
Crossroads (1942)	Carrefour (1938)	
The Cry of the Owl (2009)	Le Cri du hibou (1987)	The novel The Cry of the Owl (Patricia Highsmith)
Dead Man's Shoes (1940)	Carrefour (1938)	
Deep Water (2022)	Eaux profondes (1981)	The novel Deep Water (Patricia Highsmith)
Delivery Man (2013)	Starbuck (2011, Canada)	
Diabolique (1996)	Les Diaboliques (1955)	The novel Celle qui n'était plus (Boileau-Narcejac)
Dinner for Schmucks (2010)	Le Dîner de Cons (1998)	The play Le Dîner de Cons (Francis Veber)
Down and Out in Beverly Hills (1986)	Boudu sauvé des eaux (1932)	The play Boudu sauvé des eaux (René Fauchois)
Dressed to Thrill (1935)	La couturière de Lunéville (1932)	The play La Couturière de Lunéville (Alfred Savoir)
EDtv (1999)	Louis 19, le roi des ondes (1994, Canada)	
Eye of the Beholder (1999)	Mortelle Randonnée (1983)	
Fanny (1961)	Marius (1931); Fanny (1932); César (1936)	
Fantômas (serial, 1920)	Fantômas (serial, 1913)	The Fantômas novels (Marcel Allain, Pierre Souvestre)
Fathers' Day (1997)	Les Compères (1983)	
The Firebird (1934)	Cette nuit-là (1933)	The play Firebird (Lajos Zilahy)
The First Offence (1936)	Mauvaise Graine (1934)	
Flame and the Flesh (1954)	The Kiss of Fire (1937)	The novel Naples au baiser de feu (Auguste Bailly)
Forty Little Mothers (1940)	Le mioche (1936)	
The Good Thief (2002)	Bob le flambeur (1956)	
The Grand Seduction (2013)	La grande séduction (2003, Canada)	
The Gunman (2015)	Le Choc (1982)	The novel The Prone Gunman (Jean-Patrick Manchette)
The Guv'nor (1935)	Rothchild (1933)	
Gypsy Melody (1936)	Juanita (1935)	
Happy New Year (1987)	Happy New Year (1973)	
Heartbeat (1946)	Battement de coeur (1940)	
Hell's Cargo (1939)	Alerte en Méditerranée (1938)	
Her Sister's Secret (1946)	Conflict (1938)	The novel Dark Angel (Gina Kaus)
Human Desire (1954)	La Bête Humaine (1938)	The novel La Bête humaine (Émile Zola)
Intersection (1994)	Les choses de la vie (1970)	The novel Les choses de la vie (Paul Guimard)
I Think I Love My Wife (2007)	L'Amour l'après-midi (1972)	
I Was an Adventuress (1940)	J'étais une aventurière (1938)	
Inside (2016)	Inside (2007)	
The Jesus Rolls (2019)	Going Places (1974)	
Journal of a Crime (1934)	Une vie perdue (1933)	
Jungle 2 Jungle (1997)	Un indien dans la ville (1994)	
Just My Luck (1933)	Azaïs (1932)	The play Azaïs (Fifty-Fifty)
Just Visiting (2001)	Les Visiteurs (1993)	
A Kind of Murder (2016)	Le Meurtrier (1963)	The novel The Blunderer (Patricia Highsmith)
The Lady in Question (1940)	Gribouille (1937)	
LOL (2012)	LOL (Laughing Out Loud) (2008)	
The Long Night (1947)	Le jour se lève (1939)	
The Long Way Home (1998)	Thomas Guérin... retraité (1978)	
The Lovable Cheat (1949)	Mercadet (1936)	The play Mercadet le faiseur (Honoré de Balzac)
Lucky Partners (1940)	Bonne Chance (1935)	
Lured (1947)	Pièges (1939)	
Lydia (1941)	Un carnet de bal (1937)	
Make-Up (1937)	Le Clown Bux (1935)	The novel Bux (Hans Possendorf)
Man on the Train (2011)	The Man on the Train (2002)	
The Man Who Loved Women (1983)	L'homme qui aimait les femmes (1977)	
The Man with One Red Shoe (1985)	Le Grand blond avec une chaussure noire (1972)	
Martyrs (2015)	Martyrs (2008)	
Men Don't Leave (1990)	La vie continue (1981)	
Midnight Episode (1950)	Monsieur La Souris (1942)	The novel Monsieur La Souris (Georges Simenon)
The Mirror Has Two Faces (1996)	Le Miroir à deux faces (1958)	
Mixed Nuts (1994)	Le Père Noël est une ordure (1982)	The play Le Père Noël est une ordure (Le Splendid)
Moscow Nights (1935)	Moscow Nights (1934)	
My Daughter Joy (1950)	David Golder (1931)	The novel David Golder (Irène Némirovsky)
My Father The Hero (1994)	Mon père, ce héros (1991)	
My Life with Caroline (1941)	Le train pour Venise (1938)	The play Le Train pour Venise (Louis Verneuil, Georges Berr)
The Next Three Days (2010)	Pour elle (2008)	
Nine Months (1995)	Neuf mois (1994)	
No Exit (1962)	Huis clos (1954)	The play No Exit (Jean-Paul Sartre)
One Rainy Afternoon (1936)	Monsieur Sans-Gêne (1935)	
Operation Splitsville (1999)	Génial, mes parents divorcent (1991)	
Original Sin (2001)	La sirène du Mississipi (1969)	The novel Waltz into Darkness (William Irish)
Oscar (1991)	Oscar (1967)	The play Oscar (Claude Magnier)
Palmetto (1998)	Dans la gueule du loup (1961)	The novel Just Another Sucker (James Hadley Chase)
Paradise (1991)	Le Grand Chemin (1987)	
Paradise for Three (1938)	Un oiseau rare (1935)	The novel Three Men in the Snow (Erich Kästner)
Paris When It Sizzles (1964)	La fête à Henriette (1952)	
Passion (2012)	Crime d'amour (2010)	
Point of No Return (1993)	La Femme Nikita (1990)	
Point Blank (2019)	Point Blank (2010)	
Port of Seven Seas (1938)	Marius (1931); Fanny (1932); César (1936)	
The Postman Always Rings Twice (1946)	Le Dernier Tournant (1939)	The novel The Postman Always Rings Twice (James M. Cain)
The Postman Always Rings Twice (1981)	Le Dernier Tournant (1939)	The novel The Postman Always Rings Twice (James M. Cain)
Pure Luck (1991)	La Chèvre (1981)	
Quick Change (1990)	Hold-Up (1985)	The novel Quick Change (Jay Cronley)
The Rebel Son (1938)	Taras Bulba (1936)	The novel Taras Bulba (Nikolai Gogol)
Reflections of Murder (1974, TV film)	Les Diaboliques (1955)	The novel Celle qui n'était plus (Boileau-Narcejac)
Return to Paradise (1998)	Force majeure (1989)	
Rigged (1985)	Délit de fuite (1959)	The novel Hit and Run (James Hadley Chase)
Rough Magic (1995)	Une blonde comme ça (1962)	The novel Miss Shumway Waves a Wand (James Hadley Chase)
Scarlet Street (1945)	La Chienne (1931)	The novel La Chienne (Georges de La Fouchardière)
Second Bureau (1936)	Deuxième bureau (1935)	The novel Second Bureau (Charles Robert-Dumas)
The Silent Battle (1939)	La Bataille silencieuse (1937)	The novel Le Poisson chinois (Jean Bommart)
Sleepless (2017)	Nuit Blanche (2011)	
The Soldier and the Lady (1937)	Michel Strogoff (1936)	The novel Michael Strogoff (Jules Verne)
Some Like It Hot (1959)	Fanfare d'amour (1935)	
Sommersby (1993)	Le Retour De Martin Guerre (1982)	
Sorcerer (1977)	Le Salaire de la Peur (1953)	The novel Le Salaire de la peur (Georges Arnaud)
Special Correspondents (2016)	Envoyés très spéciaux (2009)	
Station Six-Sahara (1962)	S.O.S. Sahara (1938, Germany)	The play Men Without a Past (Jean Martet)
Stranger in the House (1967)	Les Inconnus dans la maison (1942)	The novel The Strangers in the House (Georges Simenon)
Sweet Devil (1938)	Quelle drôle de gosse! (1935)	
The Talented Mr. Ripley (1999)	Plein soleil (1960)	The novel The Talented Mr. Ripley (Patricia Highsmith)
Taxi (2004)	Taxi (1998)	
Temptation Harbour (1947)	L'Homme de Londres (1943)	The novel Newhaven-Dieppe (L'Homme de Londres) (Georges Simenon)
Three Fugitives (1989)	Les Fugitifs (1986)	
Three Maxims (1936)	Varieté (1935)	
Three Men and a Baby (1987)	Trois hommes et un couffin (1985)	
The Tourist (2010)	Anthony Zimmer (2005)	
Tovarich (1937)	Tovaritch (1935)	The play Tovaritch (Jacques Deval)
The Toy (1982)	Le Jouet (1976)	
Trap for Cinderella (2013)	Piège pour Cendrillon (1965)	The novel Piège pour Cendrillon (Sébastien Japrisot)
True Lies (1994)	La Totale! (1991)	
True to life (1943)	La Famille Duraton (1939)	
The Tunnel (1935)	Le tunnel (1933)	The novel Der Tunnel (Bernhard Kellermann)
Twelve Monkeys (1995)	La Jetée (1962)	
Two Men in Town (2014)	Deux hommes dans la ville (1973)	
Two Much (1995)	Le Jumeau (1984)	The novel Two Much (Donald E. Westlake)
Under Suspicion (2000)	Garde à Vue (1981)	The novel Brainwash (John Wainwright)
Unfaithful (2002)	La Femme infidèle (1968)	
The Unfinished Dance (1947)	La mort du cygne (1937)	
The Upside (2017)	Intouchables (2011)	
The Valet (2022)	The Valet (2006)	
Violent Road (1958)	Le Salaire de la Peur (1953)	The novel Le Salaire de la peur (Georges Arnaud)
War of the Buttons (1994)	La Guerre des boutons (1962)	The novel La Guerre des boutons (Louis Pergaud)
The White Lilac (1935)	La cinquième empreinte (1934)	The play Lilas Blanc (Ladislas Fodor)
Wicker Park (2004)	L'Appartement (1996)	
Wild Target (2010)	Cible émouvante (1993)	
Willie & Phil (1980)	Jules et Jim (1962)	The novel Jules and Jim (Henri-Pierre Roché)
A Window in London (1940)	Metropolitan (1939)	
The Woman I Love (1937)	L'Équipage (1935)	The novel L'Équipage (Joseph Kessel)
The Woman in Red (1984)	Un éléphant ça trompe énormément (1976)	
Wrath of Man (2021)	Cash Truck (2004)	

== German ==
English-language film	German-language film	Common source material (if any)
24 Hours of a Woman's Life (1952)	24 Hours in the Life of a Woman (1931)	The novella Twenty-Four Hours in the Life of a Woman (Stefan Zweig)
Addio Mimí! (1949)	The Charm of La Boheme (1937, Austria)	A modernized version of the opera La bohème (Giacomo Puccini, Luigi Illica, Giuseppe Giacosa, Henri Murger)
Adorable (1933)	Her Grace Commands (1931)	
After the Ball (1932)	The Opera Ball (1931)	
Alone in Berlin (2016)	Everyone Dies Alone (1976, West Germany)	The novel Every Man Dies Alone (Hans Fallada)
The Angel with the Trumpet (1950)	The Angel with the Trumpet (1948, Austria)	The novel Der Engel mit der Posaune (Ernst Lothar)
Baby Cakes (1989)	Sugarbaby (1985)	
Bachelor Mother (1939)	Little Mother (1935, Austria)	
Ball at Savoy (1936)	Ball at the Savoy (1935, Austria)	The operetta Ball im Savoy (Paul Abraham, Alfred Grünwald, Fritz Löhner-Beda)
Beauty and the Boss (1932)	Poor as a Church Mouse (1931)	The play A templom egére (Ladislas Fodor)
Between Us Girls (1942)	A Precocious Girl (1934, Austria)	The play Le Fruit Vert (Jacques Théry, Regis Gignoux)
Blast (2004)	Operation Noah (1998)	
The Blue Angel (1959)	The Blue Angel (1930)	The novel Professor Unrat (Heinrich Mann)
Bundle of Joy (1956)	Little Mother (1935, Austria)	
Burning Secret (1988)	The Burning Secret (1933)	The short story Brennendes Geheimnis (Stefan Zweig)
The Captain from Köpenick (1945)	The Captain from Köpenick (1931)	The play Der Hauptmann von Köpenick (Carl Zuckmayer), based on Wilhelm Voigt
The Challenge (1938)	Struggle for the Matterhorn (1928, Switzerland)	
The Church Mouse (1934)	Poor as a Church Mouse (1931)	The play A templom egére (Ladislas Fodor)
City of Angels (1998)	Wings of Desire (1987, West Germany)	
Confession (1937)	Mazurka (1935)	
The Countess of Monte Cristo (1934)	The Countess of Monte Cristo (1932)	
The Countess of Monte Cristo (1948)	The Countess of Monte Cristo (1932)	
Desire (1936)	Happy Days in Aranjuez (1933)	The play Die schönen Tage von Aranjuez (János Székely, Robert A. Stemmle)
The Diplomatic Lover (1934)	The Ladies Diplomat (1932)	
Doomed Battalion (1932)	Mountains on Fire (1931)	
Dreaming Lips (1937)	Dreaming Lips (1932)	The play Mélo (Henri Bernstein)
Dreams Come True (1936)	The World's in Love (1935, Austria)	The operetta Clo-Clo (Franz Lehar, Bela Jenbach)
Eight Girls in a Boat (1934)	Eight Girls in a Boat (1932)	
Emil and the Detectives (1935)	Emil and the Detectives (1931)	The novel Emil and the Detectives (Erich Kästner)
Emil and the Detectives (1964)	Emil and the Detectives (1931)	The novel Emil and the Detectives (Erich Kästner)
The Emperor's Candlesticks (1937)	The Emperor's Candlesticks (1936, Austria)	The novel The Emperor's Candlesticks (Baroness Orczy)
Escapade (1935)	Maskerade (1934, Austria)	
The Experiment (2010)	Das Experiment (2001)	The novel Black Box (Mario Giordano), based on the Stanford prison experiment
First a Girl (1935)	Victor and Victoria (1933)	
Forget Me Not (1936)	Forget Me Not (1935)	
Funny Games (2007)	Funny Games (1997, Austria)	
The Ghost Comes Home (1940)	The Valiant Navigator (1935)	The play Der mutige Seefahrer (Georg Kaiser)
The Girl Downstairs (1938)	Catherine the Last (1936, Austria)	
Give Her a Ring (1934)	Wrong Number, Miss (1932)	
Goodnight Mommy(2022)	Goodnight Mommy(2014, Austria)	
Happy Go Lovely (1951)	And Who Is Kissing Me? (1933)	
Head Full of Honey (2018)	Head Full of Honey (2014)	
Her Majesty, Love (1931)	Her Majesty the Barmaid (1931)	
It's a Boy (1933)	Hooray, It's a Boy! (1931)	The play Hurra, ein Junge (Franz Arnold, Ernst Bach)
Jakob the Liar (1999)	Jacob the Liar (1975, East Germany)	The novel Jacob the Liar (Jurek Becker)
The Last Waltz (1936)	The Last Waltz (1934)	The operetta Der letzte Walzer (Oscar Straus, Julius Brammer, Alfred Grünwald)
The Lightship (1985)	The Lightship (1963, West Germany)	The novella Das Feuerschiff (Siegfried Lenz)
Little Man, What Now? (1934)	Little Man, What Now? (1933)	The novel Little Man, What Now? (Hans Fallada)
Love Again (2023)	SMS für Dich (2016)	The novel SMS für dich (Sofie Cramer)
Love in the Afternoon (1957)	Ariane (1931)	The novel Ariane, jeune fille russe (Claude Anet)
Love Me and the World Is Mine (1928)	Hannerl and Her Lovers (1921)	The novel Hannerl and Her Lovers (Rudolf Hans Bartsch)
M (1951)	M (1931)	
Madame Spy (1934)	Under False Flag (1932)	
Mad Love (1935)	The Hands of Orlac (1924, Austria)	The novel Les Mains d'Orlac (Maurice Renard)
The Missing Guest (1938)	Secret of the Blue Room (1932)	
Murder in the Blue Room (1944)	Secret of the Blue Room (1932)	
My Love Came Back (1940)	Episode (1935, Austria)	
No Reservations (2007)	Bella Martha (2001)	
Nosferatu (2024)	Nosferatu (1922)	The novel Dracula (Bram Stoker)
Oh, Daddy! (1935)	The True Jacob (1931)	The play Der wahre Jakob (Franz Arnold, Ernst Bach)
On Secret Service (1933)	Spies at Work (1933)	
One Exciting Adventure (1934)	What Women Dream (1933)	
Paradise for Two (1937)	And Who Is Kissing Me? (1933)	
The Parent Trap (1961)	Two Times Lotte (1950, West Germany)	The novel Lottie and Lisa (Erich Kästner)
People Will Talk (1951)	Doctor Praetorius (1950, West Germany)	The play Frauenarzt Dr. med. Hiob Prätorius (Curt Goetz)
The Pledge (2001)	It Happened in Broad Daylight (1958, Switzerland)	The novella The Pledge: Requiem for the Detective Novel (Friedrich Dürrenmatt)
Premiere (1938)	Premiere (1937, Austria)	
Prince of Arcadia (1933)	The Prince of Arcadia (1932)	
The Private Affairs of Bel Ami (1947)	Bel Ami (1939)	The novel Bel-Ami (Guy de Maupassant)
Ripley's Game (2002)	The American Friend (1977, West Germany)	The novel Ripley's Game (Patricia Highsmith)
The Road Within (2014)	Vincent Wants to Sea (2010)	
The Secret of the Blue Room (1933)	Secret of the Blue Room (1932)	
The Smiling Lieutenant (1931)	A Waltz Dream (1925)	The operetta Ein Walzertraum (Oscar Straus, Leopold Jacobson, Felix Dörmann)
The Soldier and the Lady (1937)	The Czar's Courier (1936)	The novel Michael Strogoff (Jules Verne)
A Song to Remember (1945)	Farewell Waltz (1934)	
The Song You Gave Me (1933)	The Song Is Ended (1930)	
The Sound of Music (1965)	The Trapp Family (1956, West Germany)	The memoir The Story of the Trapp Family Singers (Maria von Trapp)
Spring Parade (1940)	Spring Parade (1934, Austria)	
A Star Fell from Heaven (1936)	A Star Fell from Heaven (1934, Austria)	
Star of the Circus (1938)	Truxa (1937)	
Stolen Identity (1953)	I Was Jack Mortimer (1935)	The novel Ich war Jack Mortimer (Alexander Lernet-Holenia)
Storm in a Teacup (1937)	Storm in a Water Glass (1931, Austria)	The play Sturm im Wasserglas (Bruno Frank)
Storm Over Tibet (1952)	Demon of the Himalayas (1935, Switzerland)	
Strangler of the Swamp (1946)	Fährmann Maria (1936)	
Talk About Jacqueline (1942)	Talking About Jacqueline (1937)	The novel Man spricht über Jacqueline (Katrin Holland)
There Goes Susie (1934)	Marion, That's Not Nice (1933)	
There Goes the Bride (1932)	I'll Stay with You (1931)	
The Thirteenth Floor (1999)	World on a Wire (1973, West Germany)	The novel Simulacron-3 (Daniel F. Galouye)
Three Maxims (1936)	Variety (1935)	
Top Hat (1935)	Scandal in Budapest (1933)	The play A Girl Who Dares (Sándor Faragó, Aladar Laszlo)
The Tunnel (1935)	The Tunnel (1933)	The novel Der Tunnel (Bernhard Kellermann)
Twice Upon a Time (1953)	Two Times Lotte (1950, West Germany)	The novel Lottie and Lisa (Erich Kästner)
Two Hearts in Waltz Time (1934)	Two Hearts in Waltz Time (1930)	
Victor/Victoria (1982)	Victor and Victoria (1933)	
Who's Your Lady Friend? (1937)	The Gentleman Without a Residence (1934, Austria)	The play Der Herr ohne Wohnung (Bela Jenbach, Rudolf Österreicher)

== Hebrew ==
English-language film	Hebrew-language film	Common source material (if any)
The Angriest Man in Brooklyn (2014)	The 92 Minutes of Mr. Baum (1997)	
The Debt (2010)	The Debt (2007)	
The Kindergarten Teacher (2018)	The Kindergarten Teacher (2014)	
The Last American Virgin (1982)	Lemon Popsicle (1978)	

== Hindi ==
English-language film	Hindi-language film	Common source material (if any)
A Common Man (2013)	A Wednesday! (2008)	
Broken Horses (2015)	Parinda (1989)	

== Hungarian ==
English-language film	Hungarian-language film	Common source material (if any)
Car of Dreams (1935)	Meseautó (1934)	
Escape to Victory (1981)	Two Half Times in Hell (1961)	
Top Hat (1935)	Pardon, tévedtem (1933)	The play A Girl Who Dares (Sándor Faragó, Aladar Laszlo)

== Icelandic ==
English-language film	Icelandic-language film	Common source material (if any)
Contraband (2012)	Reykjavík-Rotterdam (2008)	
Prince Avalanche (2013)	Either Way (2011)	
Rams (2020)	Rams (2015)	

== Italian ==
English-language film	Italian-language film	Common source material (if any)
13 Men and a Gun (1938)	Tredici uomini e un cannone (1936)	
Black 13 (1953)	Gioventù perduta (1948)	
Crackers (1984)	I Soliti Ignoti (1958)	
Everybody's Fine (2009)	Stanno Tutti Bene (1990)	
Heartbeat (1946)	Heartbeat (1939)	
I'll Give a Million (1938)	Darò un milione (1935)	
Kiss Me, Stupid (1964)	Moglie per una notte (1952)	The play L'ora della fantasia (Anna Bonacci)
The Last Kiss (2006)	L'ultimo bacio (2001)	
Me and Him (1988)	Io e lui (1973)	The novel Io e lui (Alberto Moravia)
Misunderstood (1984)	Incompreso (1966)	The novel Misunderstood (Florence Montgomery)
Nine (2009)	8½ (1963)	
Once Upon a Crime (1992)	Crimen (1960)	
The Postman Always Rings Twice (1946)	Ossessione (1943)	The novel The Postman Always Rings Twice (James M. Cain)
The Postman Always Rings Twice (1981)	Ossessione (1943)	The novel The Postman Always Rings Twice (James M. Cain)
Scent of a Woman (1992)	Profumo di donna (1974)	The novel Il buio e il miele (Giovanni Arpino)
Sweet Charity (1969)	Le Notti di Cabiria (1957)	
Swept Away (2002)	Travolti da un insolito destino nell'azzurro mare d'agosto (1974)	
A Walk in the Clouds (1995)	Quattro passi fra le nuvole (1942)	
Welcome to Collinwood (2002)	I Soliti Ignoti (1958)	
Which Way Is Up? (1977)	Mimì metallurgico ferito nell'onore (1972)	
Wild Is the Wind (1957)	Furia (1947)	

== Japanese ==
English-language film	Japanese-language film	Common source material (if any)
Alita: Battle Angel (2019)	Battle Angel (1993)	The manga Battle Angel Alita (Yukito Kishiro)
Apartment 1303 3D (2012)	Apartment 1303 (2007)	The novel Apartment 1303 (Kei Oishi)
Battle Beyond the Stars (1980)	Seven Samurai (1954)	
Dark Water (2005)	Dark Water (2002)	The short story "Floating Water" (Koji Suzuki)
Death Note (2017)	Death Note (2006)	The manga Death Note
Don't Look Up (2009)	Don't Look Up (1996)	
Eight Below (2006)	Antarctica (1983)	
A Fistful of Dollars (1964)	Yojimbo (1961)	
Ghost in the Shell (2017)	Ghost in the Shell (1995)	The manga Ghost in the Shell (Masamune Shirow)
Godzilla (1998); Godzilla (2014)	Gojira (1954)	
The Grudge (2004)	Ju-On: The Grudge (2002)	
The Grudge (2020)	Ju-On: The Grudge (2002)	
The Guardian (2006)	Umizaru (2004)	
Hachi: A Dog's Tale (2009)	Hachikō Monogatari (1987)	
Highest 2 Lowest (2025)	High and Low (1963)	The novel King's Ransom by Ed McBain
The Outrage (1964); Iron Maze (1991)	Rashomon (1950)	The short stories "Rashōmon" and "In a Grove" (Ryūnosuke Akutagawa)
Last Man Standing (1996)	Yojimbo (1961)	
Living (2022)	Ikiru (1952)	The novella The Death of Ivan Ilyich by Leo Tolstoy
The Magnificent Seven (1960); The Magnificent Seven (2016)	Seven Samurai (1954)	
Midnight Sun (2018)	Midnight Sun (2006)	
One Missed Call (2008)	Chakushin Ari (2003)	
Pulse (2006)	Kairo (2001)	
The Ring (2002)	Ring (1998)	The novel Ring (Koji Suzuki)
The Secret (2007)	Himitsu (1999)	The novel Naoko (Keigo Higashino)
Shall We Dance? (2004)	Shall We Dance? (1996)	
The Warrior and the Sorceress (1984)	Yojimbo (1961)	
The Yellow Handkerchief (2008)	The Yellow Handkerchief (1977)	

== Korean ==
English-language film	Korean-language film	Common source material (if any)
The Adventures of Galgameth (1996)	Pulgasari (1985, North Korea)	
Bugonia (2025)	Save the Green Planet! (2003)	
Compulsion (2013)	301, 302 (1995)	
The Lake House (2006)	Il Mare (2000)	
Mirrors (2008)	Into the Mirror (2003)	
My Sassy Girl (2008)	My Sassy Girl (2001)	The novel My Sassy Girl (Kim Ho-sik)
Oldboy (2013)	Oldboy (2003)	The manga Old Boy (Nobuaki Minegishi, Garon Tsuchiya)
Possession (2009)	Addicted (2002)	
The Uninvited (2009)	A Tale of Two Sisters (2003)	The folk tale "Janghwa Hongryeon jeon"

== Norwegian ==
English-language film	Norwegian-language film	Common source material (if any)
Cold Pursuit (2019)	In Order of Disappearance (2014)	
Head Above Water (1996)	Hodet over vannet (1993)	
Insomnia (2002)	Insomnia (1997)	
Over Your Dead Body(2026)	The Trip (2021)	
Pathfinder (2007)	Pathfinder (1987, in Sami language)	
Two Living, One Dead (1961)	To levende og en død (1937)	The novel To levende og en død (Sigurd Christiansen)

== Polish ==
English-language film	Polish-language film	Common source material (if any)
Kaaterskill Falls (2001)	Knife in the Water (1962)	

== Portuguese ==
English-language film	Portuguese-language films	Common source material (if any)
Kiss Me Goodbye (1982)	Dona Flor and Her Two Husbands (1976, Brazil)	The novel Dona Flor and Her Two Husbands (Jorge Amado)
Kiss of the Spider Woman (2025)	Kiss of the Spider Woman (1985, Brazil)	The novel Kiss of the Spider Woman (Manuel Puig)

== Russian ==
English-language film	Russian-language film	Common source material (if any)
About Fate (2022)	The Irony of Fate (1976)	
Making Mr. Right (1987)	His Name Was Robert (1967)	
Solaris (2002)	Solaris (1972)	The novel Solaris (Stanisław Lem)

== Spanish ==
English-language film	Spanish-language film	Common source material (if any)
Champions (2023)	Champions (2018, Spain)	
Criminal (2004)	Nueve Reinas (2000, Argentina)	
Dead Ringer (1964)	La Otra (1946, Mexico)	
Elsa & Fred (2014)	Elsa y Fred (2005, Argentina)	
Gloria Bell (2018)	Gloria (2013, Chile)	
Hidden in the Woods (2014)	En las Afueras de la Ciudad (2012, Chile)	
The Invite (2026)	The People Upstairs (2020, Spain)	The play Los vecinos de arriba (Cesc Gay)
Locked (2025)	4x4 (2019, Argentina)	
Miss Bala (2019)	Miss Bala (2011, Mexico)	
My Fault: London (2025)	My Fault (2023, Spain)	The novel Culpa mía (Mercedes Ron)
Puzzle (2018)	Rompecabezas (2010, Argentina)	
Quarantine (2008)	REC (2007, Spain)	
Retribution (2023)	Retribution (2015, Spain)	
Savage Pampas (1966)	Pampa bárbara (1945, Argentina)	
Secret in Their Eyes (2015)	El secreto de sus ojos (2009, Argentina)	The novel La pregunta de sus ojos (Eduardo Sacheri)
Silent House (2011)	La Casa Muda (2010, Uruguay)	
The Torch (1950)	Enamorada (1946, Mexico)	
Under Your Spell (1936)	Las fronteras del amor (1934, USA)	
Vanilla Sky (2001)	Abre los ojos (1997, Spain)	
We Are What We Are (2013)	Somos lo que Hay (2010, Mexico)	
You Were Never Lovelier (1942)	Los martes, orquídeas (1941, Argentina)	

== Swedish ==
English-language film	Swedish-language film	Common source material (if any)
Alone (2020)	Försvunnen (2011)	
Barabbas (1961)	Barabbas (1953)	The novel Barabbas (Pär Lagerkvist)
Downhill (2020)	Force Majeure (2014)	
The Girl with the Dragon Tattoo (2011)	Män som hatar kvinnor (2009)	The novel Män som hatar kvinnor (Stieg Larsson)
Honeysuckle Rose (1980)	Intermezzo (1936)	
Intermezzo (1939)	Intermezzo (1936)	
The Invisible (2007)	Den osynlige (2002)	The novel Den osynlige (Mats Wahl)
The Last House on the Left (1972)	Jungfrukällan (1960)	13th-century ballad, "Töres döttrar i Wänge"
The Last House on the Left (2009)	Jungfrukällan (1960)	13th-century ballad, "Töres döttrar i Wänge"
Let Me In (2010)	Let the Right One In (2008)	The novel Låt den rätte komma in (John Ajvide Lindqvist)
A Little Night Music (1977)	Smiles of a Summer Night (1955)	
A Man Called Otto (2022)	A Man Called Ove (2015)	The novel A Man Called Ove (Fredrik Backman)
Naked (2017)	Naken (2000)	
The New Adventures of Pippi Longstocking (1988)	Pippi Longstocking (1969)	The novel Pippi Longstocking (Astrid Lindgren)
Servants' Entrance (1934)	Servant's Entrance (1932)	The novel Vi som går kjøkkenveien (Sigrid Boo)
A Woman's Face (1941)	A Woman's Face (1938)	The play Il etait une fois (Francis de Croisset)

== Telugu ==
English-language film	Telugu-language film	Common source material (if any)
Divorce Invitation (2012)	Aahvaanam (1997)	

== Thai ==
English-language film	Thai-language film	Common source material (if any)
13 Sins (2014)	13 Beloved (2006)	The comic "13th Quiz Show" episode in the My Mania comic-book series (Eakasit Thairaat)
Bangkok Dangerous (2008)	Bangkok Dangerous (1999)	
Shutter (2008)	Shutter (2004)	

== See also ==
- List of film remakes
  - List of film remakes (A–M)
  - List of film remakes (N–Z)
