= Film remake =

Film based upon an earlier production

A film remake is a film based on a previous production.

The concept is popular with film studios and production companies because it reduces the financial risks, as fans of the original work are likely to want to see something similar to the film they already like. In some cases, the producer or studio which made the original film still retains the film rights and so does not require a new film option or need to develop a new story, reducing the financial costs.

Remakes are sometimes near copies, such as the 1952 The Prisoner of Zenda, nearly identical to the 1937 black-and-white version but shot in Technicolor, and Psycho (1998), a shot-for-shot color remake of the black-and-white Psycho (1960). More frequently, some changes or new elements are introduced, e.g. in the original The Front Page (1931), a male newspaper editor tries to keep his male star reporter from quitting; in the remake His Girl Friday (1940), the reporter is female and the editor's ex-wife. Black Caesar (1973) is a blaxploitation retelling of Little Caesar (1931).

Technological advances can allow a remake to include features that were not possible at the time the original was made. A silent film can be remade as a "talkie", a black-and-white movie can be remade in color, or a 2D motion picture can be remade as a 3D film. Several animated films have been remade as live action productions, such as Alice in Wonderland (2010) and Cinderella (2015).

Remakes can be made in different languages or in a different setting. The English-language color film The Magnificent Seven (1960) is an adaptation of the Japanese black-and-white film Seven Samurai (1954), transferring the story from Sengoku period in Japan to the American Wild West. Musical remakes have been made, such as Lost Horizon (1973), a musical fantasy version of Lost Horizon (1937), originally a drama.

== Examples ==
- List of film remakes (A–M)
- List of film remakes (N–Z)
- List of English-language films with previous foreign-language film versions
- List of remakes and adaptations of Disney animated films
