= List of film remakes =

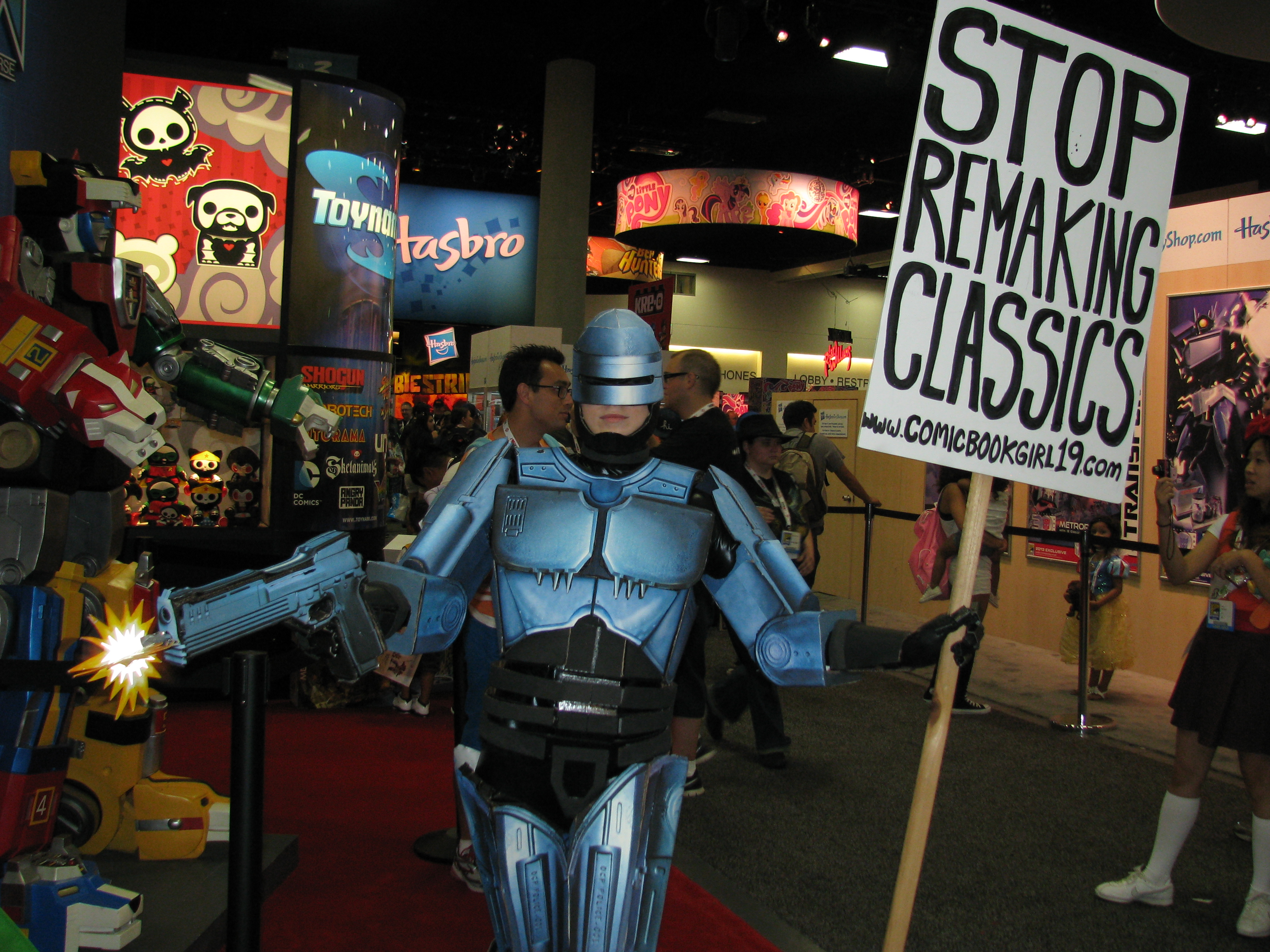
A costume of RoboCop holding a sign which says "stop remaking classics"

This is a list of film remakes. Due to the size of this page, the main listing has been split into two sections:

- List of film remakes (A–M)
- List of film remakes (N–Z)

== See also ==
- Remake
- List of American television series based on British television series
- List of English-language films with previous foreign-language film versions
- List of remakes and adaptations of Disney animated films
