= Just Once a Great Lady =

Just Once a Great Lady (German:Einmal eine große Dame sein) may refer to:

- Just Once a Great Lady (1934 film), a German film directed by Gerhard Lamprecht
- Just Once a Great Lady (1957 film), a West German film directed by Erik Ode
