= Love Is a Racket =

1932 film

- Directed by: William A. Wellman
- Written by: Courtney Terrett (adaptation)
- Based on: Love Is a Racket; 1931 novel by Rian James
- Starring: Douglas Fairbanks Jr.
- Cinematography: Sidney Hickox
- Edited by: William Holmes
- Music by: Leo F. Forbstein (Vitaphone Orch cond)
- Distributed by: Warner Bros. Pictures
- Release date: June 10, 1932
- Running time: 72 minutes
- Country: United States
- Language: English

Love Is a Racket (UK title: Such Things Happen) is a 1932 American pre-Code romantic comedy-drama film, starring Douglas Fairbanks, Jr. and Ann Dvorak. The movie was written by Courtney Terrett from the novel by Rian James, and directed by William A. Wellman.

== Plot ==
In this drama based on Rian James' novel, Douglas Fairbanks Jr. plays a sophisticated Broadway gossip columnist. He finds himself smitten with Broadway starlet Frances Dee. However, her ties to a notorious gangster, who often covers her debts, complicates things. The plot thickens when Dee's aunt murders the gangster, prompting Dee to desert Fairbanks for a producer promising her a role in his upcoming play. Despite risking everything to save her, the columnist is left in solitude, reflecting on his heartbreak. Additionally, Lee Tracy, despite having a limited role in this movie, would soon become a cinematic icon as the epitome of the sharp-witted, rapid-fire journalist.

== Cast ==
- Douglas Fairbanks, Jr. as James Russell
- Ann Dvorak as Sally Condon
- Frances Dee as Mary Wodehouse
- Lee Tracy as Stanley Fiske
- Lyle Talbot as Eddie Shaw
- Cecil Cunningham as Aunt Hattie Donovan
- Terrance Ray as Seeley
- Warren Hymer as Burney Olds
- André Luguet as Max Boncour (as Andre Luguet)
- George Beranger as Manager of Elizabeth Morgan's
- Gino Corrado as Sardi's Waiter
- George Ernest as Newsboy
- Harrison Greene as City Editor
- Eddie Kane as Sardi's Captain of Waiters
- John Larkin as Tod - Jimmy's Elevator Operator
- Matt McHugh as Stoney Davis
- Edward McWade as Messenger
- Charles R. Moore as Sam - Eddie's Elevator Operator
- Henry Otho as Police Sergeant in Eddie's Apartment
- Bob Perry as Tony, Burney's Henchman
- Lillian Worth as Girl
- George Raft as "Sneaky" (scenes deleted)
- William Burress as Ollie (scenes deleted)
