= Rian James =

American screenwriter (1899–1953)

- Born: Julian Herbert Rothschild aka James Herbert Rothschild; October 3, 1899; Manhattan, New York, U.S.
- Died: April 26, 1953 (aged 53); Newport Beach, California, U.S.
- Occupation: Screenwriter
- Years active: 1932–1947

Rian James (né Julian Herbert Rothschild; October 3, 1899 – April 26, 1953) was an American screenwriter and author. He wrote for more than 30 films between 1932 and 1947.

== Career ==
A "Jack of all trades", James was a columnist covering arts and entertainment for the Brooklyn Eagle from about 1928 to 1935. He later was a foreign correspondent, parachute jumper, stunt man, airmail pilot, Air Force lieutenant, vaudeville actor, and finally, writer, director and producer.

== Selected works ==
- Dining in New York (2nd ed.), John Day Company (1931); OCLC 4422342
- Love is a Racket, Alfred H. King (1931); OCLC 2813381
- 42nd Street (screenplay); OCLC 25378334
- Helldorado
- Not Made In Heaven, Julian Messner (1936)
- Broadway Limited (1941)

== Selected filmography ==
As story writer

- Love Is a Racket (1932)
- Parachute Jumper (1933)
- Down Argentine Way (1940)
- Eve Knew Her Apples (1945)

As screenwriter

- 42nd Street (1933)
- Mary Stevens, M.D. (1933)
- Lawyer Man (1933)
- Gift of Gab (1934)
- The Witness Chair (1936)
- Walking on Air (1936)
- Internes Can't Take Money (1937)
- The Housekeeper's Daughter (1939)
- The Gorilla (1939)
- Broadway Limited (1941)
- Parachute Nurse (1942)
- Not a Ladies Man (1942)
- La Otra (1946), remade as Dead Ringer (1964)
- Whispering City (1947)
- La Forteresse (1947)

As adaptation writer

- The White Parade (1934)
- The Dragon Murder Case (1934)

== Family history ==
Several biographical sources state that James was born in Eagle Pass, Texas. But he was actually born in Manhattan, New York, October 3, 1899, to Alexander Walter Rothschild and Sophie Nusbaum. James died at age 53, from Leukemia, in Newport Beach, California. He was survived by wife Anne James (née Marina Alexeieff Zeitlin, known as Anne Andre; born 1919), an English actress, and children, Rian Jeffrey James and Victoria James. James' mother was a sister-in-law of songwriter Albert Von Tilzer.

Prior marriages

- Dorothy Pauline Barmon (1902–1976), married March 31, 1921
- Goldie Jane H. Taub (born 1904), married April 28, 1924, Manhattan, New York
- Diane Corday, married May 5, 1930, divorced April 18, 1936
