= Nathalie... =

2003 French film by Anne Fontaine

- Theatrical release poster
- Directed by: Anne Fontaine
- Screenplay by: Anne Fontaine; Jacques Fieschi; François-Olivier Rousseau
- Based on: An original idea by Philippe Blasband
- Produced by: Alain Sarde
- Starring: Fanny Ardant; Gérard Depardieu; Emmanuelle Béart
- Cinematography: Jean-Marc Fabre
- Edited by: Emmanuelle Castro
- Music by: Michael Nyman
- Distributed by: Mars Distribution
- Release dates: 11 September 2003 (Toronto); 7 January 2004 (France); 20 May 2005 (Spain)
- Running time: 100 minutes
- Countries: France; Spain
- Language: French
- Budget: $7.4 million
- Box office: $8.7 million

Nathalie... is a 2003 French drama film directed by Anne Fontaine, and starring Fanny Ardant, Emmanuelle Béart, and Gérard Depardieu. The screenplay concerns a woman who discovers that her husband is cheating on her.

== Plot ==
Catherine, a gynaecologist in her forties, accidentally learns that her husband Bernard, a businessman, has cheated on her. She hires an upmarket prostitute, who works as a hairdresser, to seduce her husband and tell her the details of their meetings. She asks the girl to play a character for this and to be called Nathalie. Nathalie accepts and a very ambiguous relationship is created between the two women. Nathalie uses very crude words to describe her meetings with Bernard. Many times the contract between the two women is broken (because it goes too far or because Catherine is no longer sure of what she wants) but each time Catherine relaunches the relationship.

The two women get so close that when Nathalie finds herself homeless, Catherine finds her new accommodation, she also introduces Nathalie to her mother. The relationship is complicated when Nathalie, still playing her role, announces to Catherine that Bernard wants to live with her. Catherine asks for explanations from her husband, who swears that he has no other woman in his life. Perplexed, Catherine leads Bernard into the bistro which is her meeting place with Nathalie. When Nathalie enters the establishment and sees the couple, she flees. Nathalie then confides in Catherine that she made everything up and that she never had an intimate relationship with Bernard. Catherine decides to "forgive and forget".

== Cast ==
- Fanny Ardant as Catherine
- Gérard Depardieu as Bernard
- Emmanuelle Béart as Nathalie / Marlène
- Wladimir Yordanoff as François
- Judith Magre as Catherine's mother

The role of Nathalie was initially to be played by Vanessa Paradis, but the actress had to decline the role because of pregnancy.

== Reception ==
On Rotten Tomatoes the film has an approval rating of 71% based on reviews from 24 critics. The website's consensus reads, "A seductive French import that portrays adult issues of jealousy and betrayal with strong lead performances and considerable French charm." On Metacritic, the film has a score of 69% based on reviews from 11 critics, indicating "generally favorable reviews".

Derek Elley of Variety wrote: "An intellectual-cum-sexual teaser whose twist is apparent far too early on." Kirk Honeycutt of The Hollywood Reporter called it "An unconvincing psychosexual drama that tries to reconfigure the classic romantic triangle but winds up looking like a preposterous pretzel."

== Remake ==
Director Atom Egoyan remade the film in 2009 under the title Chloe. The film stars Julianne Moore, Liam Neeson, and Amanda Seyfried. Elizabeth Weizmann of the New York Daily News contrasting the original with the remake says Egoyan "Having adapted a film—via Erin Cressida Wilson's screenplay—from an erotic French drama called Nathalie, Egoyan appears convinced that he's creating a suspenseful work of art, rather than a mildly kinky bit of arthouse exploitation." In his self-promotion, the director of the remake, Egoyan, described Chloe as more erotically charged than Nathalie...

Fontaine said that she was interested in Egoyan's take on it. Fontaine also said that she was not happy with Nathalie... because the two lead actresses of the film objected to her original intention for a lesbian relationship to develop between their characters.
