= John Wainwright (author) =

English writer

John William Wainwright (25 February 1921 – 19 September 1995) was an English crime novelist and author of 83 books, four of which have been published under the pen name Jack Ripley. He also wrote some short stories (mostly uncollected in book format), seven radio plays, and an indefinite amount of magazine articles and newspaper columns.

== Biography ==
Wainwright was born in Hunslet, an area of inner-city south Leeds, in 1921. He left school at fifteen and served as a rear gunner in Lancaster bombers during the Second World War. In 1947 he joined the West Riding Constabulary as a Police Constable. While serving as a policeman, he went back to studying in his spare time – earning himself a law degree in 1956 – and in 1965 he tried writing a crime novel, which was accepted by George Hardinge, the editor of Collins Crime Club, and published as Death in a Sleeping City. In 1966 Wainwright left the force and became a full-time novelist. In 1968 Hardinge became senior editor at Macmillan Publishers, taking Wainwright's contract with him. Wainwright died in Blackpool in 1995, a few months after the publication of his last novel, The Life and Times of Christmas Calvert... Assassin.

== Works and style ==
An extremely prolific author – from 1966 to 1984 he kept an average of three books a year – Wainwright published 78 crime novels, a short-story collection and four non-fiction works, including two autobiographical volumes, Tail-End Charlie and Wainwright's Beat; a career guide, Shall I Be a Policeman? (1967), and a home security handbook, Guard Your Castle (1973; new edition, 1983).

One of his most popular novels is Brainwash (1977), upon which the movies Garde à Vue and Under Suspicion are based. Cul-de-sac (1984) was also very well received in its days, mainly thanks to a warm endorsement by fellow writer Georges Simenon, who defined it "an unforgettable novel".

Most of his novels fall into the police procedural category, but Wainwright also tried his hand at the suspense thriller (Square Dance, 1975; Portrait in Shadows, 1986), the serial killer novel (A Ripple of Murders, 1978), the spy novel (The Crystallized Carbon Pig, 1966; Cause for a Killing, 1974), and the legal thriller (The Jury People, 1978; Man of Law, 1980), with a couple of forays into the classical whodunit and the locked room mystery (High-Class Kill, 1973). His novel All on a Summer's Day (1981), which chronicles twenty-four hours in the life of a police station in the north of England, is quite similar in conception to Ed McBain's 87th Precinct novel Hail, Hail the Gang's All Here (1971). Wainwright was also a passionate traditional jazz and swing music fan, and some of his novels have a strong jazz background, particularly the black comedy Do Nothin' till You Hear from Me (1977).

In an interview given to the Italian periodical Il Giallo Mondadori in 1975, Wainwright cited Raymond Chandler, Ed McBain and Ian Fleming as his favourite authors.

== Critical assessment ==
Wainwright always led a very private life, almost never giving interviews and rarely appearing in public, while enjoying a steady if not spectacular success in his lifetime. As a consequence of this, his name is all but forgotten nowadays (his death went completely unrecorded by newspapers and reference books until 2003), and a critical assessment of his huge output is still yet to come, considering also that all of his books are currently out of print.

== Novels as Jack Ripley ==
- Davis Doesn't Live Here Any More. (Hamish Hamilton, London). 1971
- The Pig Got up and Slowly Walked Away. (Hamish Hamilton, London). 1971
- My Word, You Should Have Seen Us. (Hamish Hamilton, London). 1972
- My God, How the Money Rolls in. (Hamish Hamilton, London). 1972

== See also ==
- John Wainwright, Tail-End Charlie: One Man's Journey through a War, Macmillan, 1978
- John Wainwright, Wainwright's Beat: One Man's Journey with a Police Force, Macmillan, 1987
- William L. DeAndrea, Encyclopedia Mysteriosa, Prentice Hall, 1989
- Bruce F. Murphy, The Encyclopedia of Murder and Mystery, St. Martin's Minotaur, 1989
- Claude Mesplède, Dictionnaire des littératures policières, Joseph K, 2003; second edition 2007
- Claude Mesplède, Luca Conti, Giovanni Zucca, Dizionario delle letterature poliziesche, Mondadori, 2009
- Judith Rhodes, "John Wainwright", in St James Guide to Crime & Mystery Writers, 1996
