= Under Suspicion (2000 film) =

Thriller film by Stephen Hopkins

- Theatrical release poster
- Directed by: Stephen Hopkins
- Screenplay by: Tom Provost; W. Peter Iliff
- Based on: Brainwash; 1979 book by John Wainwright Garde à vue 1981 film by Claude Miller; Jean Herman; Michel Audiard
- Produced by: Lori McCreary; Anne Marie Gillen; Stephen Hopkins
- Starring: Gene Hackman; Morgan Freeman; Thomas Jane; Monica Bellucci
- Cinematography: Peter Levy
- Edited by: John Smith
- Music by: BT
- Production companies: Revelations Entertainment; TF1 International
- Distributed by: Lions Gate (United States); TF1 (France)
- Release dates: May 11, 2000 (Cannes Film Festival); September 22, 2000 (United States)
- Running time: 110 minutes
- Countries: United States; France; Puerto Rico
- Language: English
- Budget: $25 million
- Box office: $1.38 million

Under Suspicion is a 2000 American-French thriller film directed by Stephen Hopkins and starring Gene Hackman, Morgan Freeman, Monica Bellucci and Thomas Jane. The film is based on the 1981 French film Garde à Vue and the British novel Brainwash (1979) written by John Wainwright. It was screened out of competition at the 2000 Cannes Film Festival.

== Plot ==
Wealthy tax attorney Henry Hearst is about to give a speech at an exclusive fundraising party in San Juan, Puerto Rico, as the city celebrates the San Sebastián Festival. He is called to the Puerto Rico Police station to be questioned about the body he found the day before – that of a young girl who had been raped and murdered. Hearst changes his version of events several times; Captain Victor Benezet and Detective Felix Owens question him about inconsistencies in his story. Hearst quickly realizes that they think he committed the murder, as well as that of another young girl whose body was found days earlier, but at this stage of questioning he is unalarmed. Benezet is under pressure from his boss to free Hearst so that he can give his speech. As there is no conclusive proof, Benezet's superior at the party says to let Hearst at least come to the party and give his fund raising speech. After a fracas at the police station, Hearst arrives, disheveled, at the party, gives his speech, and is then escorted back to the police station.

At the party, a crowd is gossiping and Chantal, Hearst's much younger wife, has to keep her face emotionless. She is questioned later about why she and her husband sleep in separate rooms. Little by little, the story that each of them tells changes, always casting Hearst in a worse light.

Hearst first blames Chantal for being jealous. Then, it is discovered he likes cheap, young prostitutes and visits pornography websites featuring barely legal-age women. Hearst says that Chantal and her brother-in-law, artist Paco Rodriguez, are lovers. Chantal says that she saw Hearst with her 13-year-old niece Camille, giving her presents and trying to seduce her. She also says that on the night of one of the recent murders she saw her husband washing his blood-stained clothes at night. Hearst adamantly denies molesting Camille, but admits that he has a fondness for younger women.

Chantal, the legal owner of the mansion where they live, permits the police to search the premises for hard evidence linking her husband to the murders. In the dark room, they find photographs of the two murdered girls. When the photographs are shown to him at the police station, Henry says that he can't believe Chantal would go this far.

Hearst, deeply hurt at this betrayal by his wife, and apparently feeling that this is the only thing that will satisfy her, begins to confess to the murders, utilizing the details that had been revealed to him by Benezet during interrogation. While still recording Hearst's confession, Benezet is notified that the real killer has been arrested, having been "caught in the act", and with damning photographs of his other victims.

Benezet and Owens free Hearst, who is still badly shaken by what he has gone through in the previous hours. Chantal attempts to connect with him outside the police station, but he cannot forgive her and walks away into the crowd of San Sebastián Festival revelers.

== Cast ==
- Gene Hackman as Henry Hearst
- Morgan Freeman as Captain Victor Benezet
- Thomas Jane as Detective Felix Owens
- Monica Bellucci as Chantal Hearst
- Nydia Caro as Isabella
- Miguel Ángel Suárez as the Superintendent
- Pablo Cunqueiro as Detective Castillo
- Isabel Algaze as Camille Rodriguez
- Jacqueline Duprey as Maria Rodriguez
- Luis Caballero as Paco Rodriguez
- Patricia Beato as Darlita
- Soledad Esponda as Reina
- Hector Travieso as Peter
- Marisol Calero as Sergeant Arias
- Vanessa Shenk as Sue Ellen Huddy
- Noel Oscar Alicea Colon as a man in white at the carnival

== Reception ==
Based on 44 reviews collected by Rotten Tomatoes, 50% of critics gave Under Suspicion a positive review, with an average rating of 5.3/10.

The film was given limited release to 19 theaters in North America, grossing a total of $334,245 during its theatrical run. The film was also given limited release internationally, grossing $752,783 in Mexico, $17,222 in Taiwan and $277,675 in the United Kingdom.

The film was nominated by the Mystery Writers of America for the 2001 Edgar Award for Best Motion Picture.
