= Just Once a Great Lady (1957 film) =

1957 film directed by Erik Ode

- German film poster
- German: Einmal eine große Dame sein
- Directed by: Erik Ode
- Written by: Walter Reisch; Janne Furch; Werner Eplinius; Fritz Böttger
- Produced by: Artur Brauner
- Starring: Gudula Blau; Grethe Weiser; Dietmar Schönherr; Erich Winn
- Cinematography: Karl Löb
- Edited by: Kurt Zeunert
- Music by: Erwin Halletz
- Production company: CCC Film
- Distributed by: Deutsche Film
- Release date: 23 August 1957
- Running time: 99 minutes
- Country: West Germany
- Language: German

Just Once a Great Lady (German: Einmal eine große Dame sein) is a 1957 West German comedy film directed by Erik Ode and starring Gudula Blau, Grethe Weiser and Dietmar Schönherr. It has the title of a 1934 film but it is a remake of The Countess of Monte Cristo (1932).

The film's art direction is by Emil Hasler. It was shot at the Spandau Studios in Berlin.

== Partial cast ==
- Gudula Blau as Jeannette Heider
- Grethe Weiser as Elly, ihre Tante
- Dietmar Schönherr as Stefan Riehl
- Erich Winn as Philipp de Witt
- Gustl Weishappel as Freddy, sein Sekretär
- Walter Feuchtenberg as Zwingeli, Hoteldetektiv
- Kurd Pieritz as Sawitzky, Regisseur
- Hannelore Könemann as Lucia Murano
- Peter Jost as Schmöller, manager
- Luigi Malipiero as hotel manager
- Jupp Flohr as Guggemoos, Portier
- Elke Arendt as Frl. Wind, Sekretärin in Redaktion
- Margit Jung as Tankstellenmädchen
- Wolfgang Müller as Wolfgang Berger
- Henry Lorenzen as Lord Uppercut
- Martin Berliner as Lauterer, recording Manager
- Horst Naumann as Kurt Jäger
- Olive Moorefield as Olive, Singer
- Barbara Saade as Tankstellenmädchen
- Heinz Schulz as petrol station attendant
- Monika Peitsch as Sekretärin von Schmöller

== See also ==
- The Countess of Monte Cristo (1932)
- The Countess of Monte Cristo (1934)
- The Countess of Monte Cristo (1948)
