= The Countess of Monte Cristo (1932 film) =

1932 film

- German film poster
- German: Die Gräfin von Monte-Christo
- Directed by: Karl Hartl
- Written by: Walter Reisch
- Produced by: Gregor Rabinovitch
- Starring: Brigitte Helm; Rudolf Forster; Lucie Englisch
- Cinematography: Franz Planer
- Edited by: Rudolf Schaad
- Music by: Allan Gray
- Production companies: Majestic-Film; UFA
- Distributed by: UFA
- Release date: 22 April 1932
- Running time: 98 minutes
- Country: Germany
- Language: German

The Countess of Monte Cristo (German: Die Gräfin von Monte-Christo) is a 1932 German comedy drama film directed by Karl Hartl and starring Brigitte Helm, Rudolf Forster and Lucie Englisch.

The film's sets were designed by the art directors Robert Herlth and Walter Röhrig. It was shot at the Babelsberg Studios outside Berlin and on location in Vienna and the ski resort of Semmering. It was remade in the United States in 1934 with Fay Wray in the lead role.

== Plot ==
Two struggling actresses are hired as extras to drive an expensive car while dressed in fancy outfits. Stopping at a winter resort, one of them is mistakenly identified as the "Countess of Monte Cristo", a VIP guest expected to arrive around this time. Rather than clearing up this misunderstanding, the two give in to the temptation and pass themselves off as members of the wealthy set.

== Cast ==
- Brigitte Helm as Jeanette Heider, Filmkomparsin
- Rudolf Forster as Rumowski, Impostor
- Lucie Englisch as Mimi, Filmkomparsin
- Gustaf Gründgens as Der 'Baron' Impostor
- Oskar Sima as Aufnahmeleiter Spitzkopf
- Mathias Wieman as Stephan Riehl, Journalist
- Flockina von Platen as Filmdiva
- Ernst Dumcke as film director
- Hans Junkermann as Hoteldirektor
- Theo Lingen as Etagenkellner
- Max Gülstorff as newspaper editor
- Karl Etlinger as newspaper editor
- Harry Hardt as Detective Commissioner

== See also ==
- The Countess of Monte Cristo (1934)
- The Countess of Monte Cristo (1948)
- Just Once a Great Lady (1957)
