= The Countess of Monte Cristo (1948 film) =

1948 film by Frederick de Cordova

- Directed by: Fred de Cordova; Andrew L. Stone (uncredited)
- Screenplay by: William Bowers
- Story by: Walter Reisch
- Produced by: John Beck
- Starring: Sonja Henie; Olga San Juan; Dorothy Hart; Michael Kirby; Arthur Treacher
- Cinematography: Edward Cronjager
- Edited by: Edward Curtiss
- Music by: Walter Scharf
- Production company: Westwood Corporation
- Distributed by: Universal Pictures
- Release date: November 1948
- Running time: 77 minutes
- Country: United States
- Language: English

The Countess of Monte Cristo is a 1948 American comedy film directed by Fred de Cordova and starring Sonja Henie, Olga San Juan and Dorothy Hart. The film was distributed by Universal Pictures. It was Henie's last dramatic feature film.

== Plot ==
Karen and Jenny, Oslo night club waitresses, get an offer for screen tests at film studios. The roles are for "Countess of Monte Cristo" and her maid.

The test is a disaster, and the girls leave the studios in anger, taking one of the studio's cars as well as costumes. They drive to the luxurious Hotel Trollheimen, and use the costumes to lure the management into thinking they really are a countess and her maid – despite having no money. They encounter Paul Von Cram, who is captivated by Karen. But she mistakes him for a hotel bellboy.

The girls discovers that they have been listed as thieves, and police are seeking them. But when the police arrive, it is not to arrest them, but to seek a known thief has stolen from other guests at the same hotel. The hotel manager also wants them to make a list of their belongings, to see if something is missing, and possibly replace it. Karen and Jenny fall in with the thief, 'Count Holgar', who knows their identity and smilingly blackmails them into claiming 'lost' items.

Paul is still smitten by Karen, and dances with her on the hotel's ice-rink, giving the air to his other lady friend, Peg Manning. Karen and Paul are so good at skating together that they win a try-out to the big ice show next day.

The police realise that Karen and Jenny are frauds, and inform the hotel manager, but he agrees to let them perform at the highly popular ice show. He has also realised what's happened, and to avoid a scandal, he goes along with their deception.

Paul convinces the police that the whole set-up was a publicity stunt for the release of the studio's latest film. He offers to pay the bills the women have worked up. Paul then admits to Karen that he was on to her from the very beginning. He tells her that he loves her, and they finish the ice show, skating together.

== Cast ==
- Sonja Henie as Karen Kirsten
- Olga San Juan as Jenny Johnsen
- Dorothy Hart as Peg Manning
- Michael Kirby as Lt. Paul Von Cram
- Arthur Treacher as Hotel Managing Director
- Hugh French as Count Holgar
- Ransom M. Sherman as Mr. Hansen
- Freddie Trenkler as Skating Specialty
- John James as Freddie
- Arthur O'Connell as Assistant Director Jensen
- Joseph Crehan as Joe
- Ray Teal as Charlie
- unbilled players include Bess Flowers and Gino Corrado

== Production ==
In December 1943 Henie signed a deal with the newly formed International Pictures to make It's a Pleasure. In November 1944, in between when It's a Pleasure was filmed and released, International announced they would make a second film with Henie, The Countess of Monte Cristo, based on a story by Walter Reisch with a script by George Beck and Frank Tarloff. The same month International announced that Marie McDonald, who had been in It's a Pleasure, had been signed to a one film a year contract for five years and would be in the film. In January 1945 Walter Thompson was announced producer.

In March 1945 International announced that William Seiter would direct and Dennis O'Keefe would co star. The following month Frank Veloz signed to do dance direction.

The project ended up being postponed. It was reactivated when International merged with Universal. In October 1947 Universal announced they would make the film. In November Andrew Stone was attached to direct.

In December Universal said they would distribute the movie, which would be made by Westwood Productions, a new company formed by John Beck and Henie. Susanna Foster was going to co star with Henie and filming was to begin in March 1948. William Bowers did a rewrite on the script.

In May filming shut down for a week as director Andrew Stone was replaced by Frederick de Cordova. The reason given was that Stone fell ill.

The movie used background footage taken in Norway which had originally been shot for a film Song of Norway that was postponed.

== Reception ==
The Los Angeles Times said "the choice of plot material is inappropriate."

Filmink magazine called it "A surprising delight. Olga San Juan is terrific. Breezy, fun, silly."

== See also ==
- The Countess of Monte Cristo (1932)
- The Countess of Monte Cristo (1934)
- Just Once a Great Lady (1957)
