= Garde à Vue =

- Directed by: Claude Miller
- Screenplay by: Claude Miller; Michel Audiard; Jean Herman
- Based on: Brainwash by John Wainwright
- Produced by: Georges Dancigers; Alexandre Mnouchkine
- Starring: Michel Serrault; Lino Ventura; Guy Marchand; Romy Schneider
- Cinematography: Bruno Nuytten
- Edited by: Albert Jurgenson
- Music by: Georges Delerue
- Production companies: Les Films Ariane; TF1 Films Production
- Distributed by: AMLF
- Release date: September 23, 1981 (France)
- Running time: 90 minutes
- Country: France
- Language: French

Garde à Vue (also known as The Inquisitor and The Grilling) is a 1981 French psychological crime drama directed by Claude Miller and starring Romy Schneider, Michel Serrault, Lino Ventura and Guy Marchand. It is based on the 1979 British novel Brainwash, by John Wainwright.

It won the César Award for Best Screenplay, Dialogue or Adaptation, Best Actor, Best Supporting Actor and Best Editing. The film had 2,098,038 admissions in France and was the 17th-most-attended film of the year.

== Plot ==
Jérôme Martinaud, a wealthy, influential attorney in Cherbourg, falls under suspicion for the rape and murder of two little girls. He is the only suspect, but the evidence against him is circumstantial. As the city celebrates New Year's Eve, the police, led by Inspector Antoine Gallien, who is investigating the double rape/murder case, brings the lawyer in for questioning. At first politely, and then less so, the interrogation team consisting of Inspectors Gallien and Marcel Belmont chips away at the suspect's alibi. They interrogate him for hour after hour while Martinaud continues to maintain his innocence. We learn all about the evidence; we meet Martinaud's wife Chantal who tells Gallien about the rift between them and the origin of it, which may be an eight-year-old girl (Camille) Martinaud was in love with. In the face of overwhelming evidence, and feeling let down by his wife, Martinaud confesses to the two rapes and murders. However a fresh corpse is discovered inside the boot of a car that was reported to be stolen, and the car's owner turns out to be guilty of the crime - exonerating Martinaud. Martinaud leaves the police station and finds his wife, who has committed suicide.

== Production ==
Screenwriter Michel Audiard discovered John Wainwright's novel, published in Série noire in 1980, and brought the project to Les Films Ariane. They suggested it to Claude Miller who decided to make Martinaud's character more psychologically complex than he was in the book.

Miller asked Lam Lê to create a complete storyboard for the film before the shooting. Filming started January 27, 1981 and wrapped March 13, 1981. The picture was filmed entirely in a studio and in chronological order.

== Reception ==
It won the César Award for Best Screenplay, Dialogue or Adaptation, Best Actor, Best Supporting Actor, and Best Editing. The film had 2,098,038 admissions in France and was the 17th-most-attended film of the year.

The film received mixed reviews from English-speaking critics. Time Out said it was "a fine psychological thriller" in which "the potential staginess of the material... is admirably shaken by inspired adaptation, mise en scène and editing." In The New York Times, Janet Maslin called it "a slow, claustrophobic crime melodrama with a lot of talk" but "the actors help keep the film relatively engrossing." Roy Armes wrote that the film "shows Miller's skills at their finest," and added that it is "a pure, hundred-minute spectacle, a story that holds the attention unerringly but which in its unfolding destroys its own painfully built logic."

== Awards ==
1981: Prix Méliès - Best Film

1981: Montreal World Film Festival - Best Screenplay

1982 César Awards:

- Best Screenplay, Dialogue or Adaptation - Claude Miller, Michel Audiard, Jean Herman
- Best Actor - Michel Serrault
- Best Supporting Actor - Guy Marchand
- Best Editing - Albert Jurgenson

== Remake ==
Garde à Vue was remade in 2000 as Under Suspicion.
