= Dead Ringer (film) =

1964 film by Paul Henreid

- Theatrical release poster
- Directed by: Paul Henreid
- Screenplay by: Albert Beich; Oscar Millard
- Story by: Rian James
- Based on: La Otra by Rian James; Roberto Gavaldón; José Revueltas; Jack Wagner
- Produced by: William H. Wright
- Starring: Bette Davis; Karl Malden; Peter Lawford; Philip Carey; Jean Hagen
- Cinematography: Ernest Haller
- Edited by: Folmar Blangsted
- Music by: André Previn
- Production company: Warner Bros. Pictures
- Distributed by: Warner Bros. Pictures
- Release date: February 19, 1964
- Running time: 115 minutes
- Country: United States
- Language: English
- Budget: $1,200,000

Dead Ringer (also known as Who Is Buried in My Grave?) is a 1964 American psychological thriller directed by Paul Henreid and starring Bette Davis, Karl Malden, Peter Lawford, Philip Carey and Jean Hagen in her final film role. It is a remake of the 1946 Mexican film La Otra. Davis portrays a woman who murders and impersonates her own, wealthier identical twin sister. The soundtrack is by André Previn and the cinematography by Ernest Haller.

The film marks the second time Davis played twin sisters, the first being in 1946's A Stolen Life. It considered a part of the psycho-biddy subgenre. Dead Ringer was released by Warner Bros. Pictures on February 19, 1964. It received positive reviews.

== Plot ==
For eighteen years, identical twin sisters Margaret and Edith have been estranged from each other. It started when Margaret faked a pregnancy to "steal" Edith's fiancé, Francesco "Frank" DeLorca, a rich American military officer both sisters dated during World War II. They meet at the funeral of Frank, whom both sisters mourn. Margaret will be secure for the rest of her life thanks to her husband's wealth, but Edith's prospects are dismal. Her business, a cocktail lounge, is losing money, and she is threatened with eviction for not paying her bills. Edith plans revenge against Margaret, phoning her to come to her room above the lounge so that they might settle their score. Soon after Margaret arrives, Edith shoots her, then swaps clothes with the corpse, framing Margaret's murder as her own suicide. She then takes over the DeLorca mansion by assuming Margaret's identity. But the mansion's servants start to become suspicious.

For one thing, the house's Great Dane, known for hating Margaret, befriends Edith. Second, Edith is a smoker, something Margaret was adamantly against. Meanwhile, Jim, a police detective who had been seeing Edith steadily before her "suicide", visits the fake Margaret several times, asking questions. Edith's scheme runs into trouble when Margaret's lover Tony unexpectedly shows up and quickly sees through her charade. Tony blackmails Edith over the killing of Margaret, receiving expensive jewelry as payment. But after Edith discovers that Margaret and Tony had conspired to murder Frank by poisoning him, Tony and Edith quarrel; when he threatens her, Margaret's Great Dane attacks and kills him.

Already suspicious about DeLorca's death, Jim leads a police investigation, exhuming Frank's body and later finding traces of arsenic. When Jim arrives to arrest "Margaret", Edith confesses her true identity, but Jim refuses to believe her, telling her, "Edie would never hurt a fly". Retaining her pose as Margaret, Edith is tried, convicted of murder and sentenced to death. As she is taken from the courthouse, Jim approaches her and asks if she really is Edith. She denies it, reminding him that he said, "Edith would never hurt a fly". She then departs for her appointment with the gas chamber.

== Cast ==
- Bette Davis as Margaret DeLorca / Edith Phillips
  - Connie Cezon as Davis' body double
- Karl Malden as Sergeant Jim Hobbson
- Peter Lawford as Tony Collins
- Philip Carey as Sergeant Hoag
- Jean Hagen as Dede Marshall
- George Macready as Paul Harrison
- Estelle Winwood as Dona Anna
- George Chandler as George
- Cyril Delevanti as Henry
- Bert Remsen as Daniel Lister
- Ken Lynch as Captain Johnson
- Monika Henreid as Janet
- Perry Blackwell as Jazz singer

== Production ==
The film is a remake of the 1946 Mexican film, La Otra, directed by Roberto Gavaldón and starring Dolores del Río. It was remade again in 1986 as Killer in the Mirror, a television movie starring Ann Jillian.

The film takes place in Los Angeles and Beverly Hills. The interior scenes were shot inside and outside the grounds of the Greystone Mansion in Beverly Hills. The bar scene was filmed at the corner of Temple and Figueroa in downtown Los Angeles. The burial scene was shot at the Rosedale Cemetery in Los Angeles.

The jazz combo in Edie's Bar was composed of electronic organist Perry Lee Blackwell and drummer Kenny Dennis, both noted musicians, but uncredited in the film. Blackwell also appears as a lounge singer in the 1959 romantic comedy Pillow Talk.

This was the final film of cinematographer Ernest Haller. He had created the trick process shots in A Stolen Life, and he improved upon the process here. Makeup artist Gene Hibbs was hired because of his unique talent for making older actresses look younger through a "painting" technique.

The film was directed by actor Paul Henreid, Davis' co-star in the 1942 romantic drama Now, Voyager. Monika Henreid, one of his two daughters, plays Janet, the maid.

Henreid called making the film "a wonderful experience".

== Critical reception ==
The film has received acclaim from modern audiences and critics, and holds a 100% approval rating on Rotten Tomatoes, based on 10 reviews.
