= La Otra (film) =

1946 film by Roberto Gavaldón

- Directed by: Roberto Gavaldón
- Written by: Rian James; Roberto Gavaldón; José Revueltas; Jack Wagner
- Produced by: Mauricio de la Serna; Jack Wagner
- Starring: Dolores del Río; Víctor Junco; José Baviera
- Edited by: Charles L. Kimball
- Music by: Raul Lavista
- Distributed by: Producciones Mercurio
- Release date: November 20, 1945
- Running time: 98 minutes
- Country: Mexico
- Language: Spanish

La Otra ("The Other" (feminine)), sometimes screened with the title The Other One, is a 1945 Mexican drama film directed and co-written by Roberto Gavaldón and starring Dolores del Río. The film was remade in 1964 as Dead Ringer, with Bette Davis.

== Plot ==
At a Christmas party, María Méndez (Dolores del Río) learns that Magdalena, her twin sister, has a comfortable lifestyle. María kills her sister and assumes her identity and lifestyle. However, her life becomes complicated by her late sister's sleazy boyfriend Fernando (Víctor Junco), and by Roberto (Agustín Irusta), who loved Magdalena.

== Production ==
It was shot at the Churubusco Studios in Mexico City.

The 96-page script was originally titled "The Other Woman" by José Revueltas, Jack Wagner, and Roberto Gavaldón from a story by Rian James. The Paul Kohler Agency represented the screenwriters.

== Cast ==
- Dolores del Río as María and Magdalena Méndez
- Víctor Junco Fernando
- Agustín Irusta as Roberto Gonzalez
- José Baviera as Sgt. De La Fuente
- Manuel Dondé as agente Vilar
- Conchita Carraced as Carmela

== Other versions ==
The script for La Otra was owned by Warner Bros. and its story was used as the basis for the 1964 film, Dead Ringer (1964), starring Bette Davis, and was remade again in 1986 as Killer in the Mirror, a television movie starring Ann Jillian.
