= The Countess of Monte Cristo (1934 film) =

1934 film by Karl Freund

- Directed by: Karl Freund
- Written by: Karen DeWolf; Norman Krasna; Walter Reisch; Earle Snell; Gladys Unger
- Produced by: Stanley Bergerman
- Starring: Fay Wray; Paul Lukas; Reginald Owen
- Cinematography: Charles J. Stumar
- Edited by: Philip Cahn
- Music by: Edward Ward
- Production company: Universal Pictures
- Distributed by: Universal Pictures
- Release date: March 19, 1934
- Running time: 78 minutes
- Country: United States
- Language: English

The Countess of Monte Cristo is a 1934 American comedy film directed by Karl Freund and starring Fay Wray, Paul Lukas and Reginald Owen. The film is a remake of a 1932 German film, Die Gräfin von Monte-Christo. It was remade again in 1948 under the same title.

== Plot ==
In Austria a struggling actress borrows the fancy clothes and car from her film set, and goes to stay in a luxury hotel under the name "Countess of Monte Cristo".

== Cast ==
- Fay Wray as Janet Krueger
- Paul Lukas as Rumowski
- Reginald Owen as The Baron
- Patsy Kelly as Mimi
- Paul Page as Stefan
- John Sheehan as Sterner
- Carmel Myers as Flower Girl
- Robert McWade as Hotel Manager
- Frank Reicher as Police Commissioner
- Richard Tucker as Picture Director
- Matthew Betz as Rumowski's Valet
- Bobby Watson as Hotel Valet
- Harvey Clark as Newspaper Editor
- Dewey Robinson as Proprietor of Exchange

== See also ==
- The Countess of Monte Cristo (1932)
- The Countess of Monte Cristo (1948)
- Just Once a Great Lady (1957)

== Bibliography ==
- Dick, Bernard F. City of Dreams: The Making and Remaking of Universal Pictures. University Press of Kentucky, 2015.
