= List of 4DX motion-enhanced films =

This is a list of films released in the 4DX motion-seated format.

== Films released in 4DX ==
=== 2028 ===
Films	Release date	Notes	Ref.
Untitled Days of Thunder sequel	June 2, 2028		

=== 2027 ===
Films	Release date	Notes	Ref.
Star Wars: Starfighter	May 28, 2027		
Gatto	March 5, 2027	In 3D.	
Star Wars	February 19, 2027	50th Anniversary re-release.	
Narnia: The Magician's Nephew	February 12, 2027		
Ice Age: Boiling Point	February 5, 2027		

=== 2026 ===
Films	Release date	Notes	Ref.
Avengers: Doomsday	December 18, 2026	In 3D.	
Dune: Part Three	December 18, 2026		
Violent Night 2	December 4, 2026		
Die Hard	December 4, 2026	Re-release.	
Hexed	November 25, 2026	In 3D.	
Doctor Who: The Satan Pit	November 23, 2026	Television episodes.	
The Hunger Games: Sunrise on the Reaping	November 20, 2026	In 3D.	
Heated Rivalry episodes "I'll Believe in Anything" and "The Cottage"	November 16, 2026	Television episodes.	
How to Rob a Bank	November 13, 2026		
Ebenezer	November 13, 2026		
Ramayana: Part 1	November 6, 2026	In 3D.	
Dr. Seuss' The Cat in the Hat	November 6, 2026	In 3D.	
Godzilla Minus Zero	November 3, 2026		
Wicker	October 28, 2026		
Clayface	October 23, 2026		
Wildwood	October 23, 2026		
Street Fighter	October 16, 2026		
Whalefall	October 16, 2026		
Other Mommy	October 9, 2026		
Star Detective Precure! The Movie: The Mysterious Garden and a Secret Pair	October 2, 2026		
Verity	October 2, 2026		
Linkin Park: Unshatter	September 30, 2026		
Heart of the Beast	September 25, 2026		
Forgotten Island	September 25, 2026	In 3D.	
Avengers: Endgame Encore	September 25, 2026	Re-release; In 3D and 2D.	
Resident Evil	September 18, 2026		
The Transformers: The Movie	September 17, 2026	40th Anniversary re-release.	
Cars	September 4, 2026	20th Anniversary re-release; In 3D.	
Obsession	September 4, 2026	Re-release.	
Onslaught	September 4, 2026		
The Dog Stars	August 28, 2026		
Coyote vs. Acme	August 28, 2026		
Insidious: Out of the Further	August 21, 2026		
The Fast and the Furious	August 21, 2026	25th Anniversary re-release.	
The End of Oak Street	August 14, 2026		
Spider-Man: Brand New Day	July 31, 2026	In 3D.	
The Odyssey	July 17, 2026		
Hope	July 15, 2026		
New Theatrical Movie Keroro Gunsō: Upon Revival, Immediately Facing the Threat of Earth's Destruction!	July 10, 2026		
Evil Dead Burn	July 10, 2026		
Moana	July 10, 2026	In 3D.	
Minions & Monsters	July 1, 2026	In 3D.	
Supergirl	June 26, 2026	In 3D and 2D.	
Toy Story 5	June 19, 2026	In 3D.	
Scary Movie	June 5, 2026		
Masters of the Universe	June 5, 2026		
Peddi	June 4, 2026	In 3D and 2D. Selected territories.	
The Amazing Digital Circus: The Last Act	June 4, 2026	Web series episodes.	
Backrooms	May 29, 2026		
7 Dogs	May 28, 2026	Arabic countries only.	
Agito: The Superpower War	May 22, 2026	Japan only.	
Star Wars: The Mandalorian and Grogu	May 22, 2026	In 3D.	
The Boys series finale episode "Blood and Bone"	May 19, 2026	Television episode.	
Shrek	May 15, 2026	25th Anniversary re-release.	
Top Gun	May 13, 2026	40th Anniversary re-release.	
Mortal Kombat II	May 8, 2026		
Michael	April 24, 2026		
Lee Cronin's The Mummy	April 17, 2026		
Detective Conan: Fallen Angel of the Highway	April 10, 2026	Japan only.	
Biker	April 3, 2026	In 3D and 2D.	
The Super Mario Galaxy Movie	April 1, 2026	In 3D.	
Project Hail Mary	March 20, 2026		
Ready or Not 2: Here I Come	March 20, 2026		
Danur: The Last Chapter	March 17, 2026	Selected territories.	
Hoppers	March 6, 2026	In 3D and 2D.	
The Bride!	March 6, 2026		
Enhyphen: Walk The Line – Summer Edition in Cinemas	March 5, 2026		
Scream 7	February 27, 2026		
Doraemon: New Nobita and the Castle of the Undersea Devil	February 27, 2026	Japan and India	
Goat	February 13, 2026	In 3D.	
Crime 101	February 13, 2026		
Stray Kids: The Dominate Experience	February 6, 2026		
Send Help	January 30, 2026	In 3D and 2D.	
Infinite Icon: A Visual Memoir	January 30, 2026		
Mercy	January 23, 2026	In 3D and 2D.	
28 Years Later: The Bone Temple	January 16, 2026		

=== 2025 ===
Name	Release date	Notes	Ref.
Anaconda	December 25, 2025		
Avatar: Fire and Ash	December 19, 2025	In 3D.	
Dr. Seuss' How the Grinch Stole Christmas	December 12, 2025	25th Anniversary re-release.	
Monsta X: Connect X in Cinemas	December 3, 2025		
Zootopia 2	November 26, 2025	In 3D and 2D.	
Jujutsu Kaisen: Execution	November 22, 2025		
Wicked: For Good	November 21, 2025	In 3D and 2D.	
The Running Man	November 14, 2025		
Predator: Badlands	November 7, 2025	In 3D and 2D.	
Back to the Future	October 31, 2025	40th Anniversary re-release.	
Baahubali: The Epic	October 31, 2025		
Corpse Bride	October 24, 2025	20th Anniversary re-release.	
Tron: Ares	October 10, 2025	In 3D.	
The Rocky Horror Picture Show	September 27, 2025	50th Anniversary re-release.	
One Battle After Another	September 26, 2025		
Kygo: Back at the Bowl	September 26, 2025		
Chainsaw Man – The Movie: Reze Arc	September 19, 2025	In 3D and 2D.	
Him	September 19, 2025		
Dogma	September 15, 2025	25th Anniversary re-release.	
Toy Story	September 12, 2025	30th Anniversary re-release.	
The Exit 8	September 12, 2025		
The Conjuring: Last Rites	September 5, 2025		
Jaws	August 29, 2025	50th Anniversary re-release; In 3D.	
Harry Potter and the Deathly Hallows – Part 2	August 27, 2025	Re-release; In 3D and 2D.	
Harry Potter and the Deathly Hallows – Part 1	August 26, 2025	Re-release.	
Harry Potter and the Half-Blood Prince	August 25, 2025	Re-release.	
Harry Potter and the Order of the Phoenix	August 24, 2025	Re-release.	
King of Prism: Your Endless Call Minna Kirameke! Prism☆Tours	August 22, 2025		
Nobody 2	August 15, 2025		
Weapons	August 8, 2025		
The Bad Guys 2	August 1, 2025	In 3D.	
The Fantastic Four: First Steps	July 25, 2025	In 3D and 2D.	
Demon Slayer: Kimetsu no Yaiba – The Movie: Infinity Castle – Part 1: Akaza Returns	July 18, 2025		
Superman	July 11, 2025	In 3D and 2D.	
Jurassic World Rebirth	July 2, 2025	In 3D.	
F1	June 27, 2025		
Jujutsu Kaisen: Hidden Inventory / Premature Death	June 21, 2025	Japan only.	
28 Years Later	June 20, 2025		
Elio	June 20, 2025	In 3D and 2D.	
How to Train Your Dragon	June 13, 2025	In 3D and 2D.	
From the World of John Wick: Ballerina	June 6, 2025		
Karate Kid: Legends	May 30, 2025		
Lilo & Stitch	May 23, 2025	In 3D and 2D.	
Mission: Impossible – The Final Reckoning	May 23, 2025		
Final Destination Bloodlines	May 16, 2025		
Ateez World Tour – Towards the Light: Will to Power	May 14, 2025		
Thunderbolts*	May 2, 2025	In 3D and 2D.	
The Accountant 2	April 25, 2025		
Star Wars: Episode III – Revenge of the Sith	April 25, 2025	20th Anniversary re-release.	
Sinners	April 18, 2025		
Detective Conan: One-eyed Flashback	April 18, 2025		
Warfare	April 11, 2025		
A Minecraft Movie	April 4, 2025	In 3D.	
Seventeen: Right Here World Tour in Cinemas	April 2, 2025		
A Working Man	March 28, 2025		
Imagine Dragons: Live from the Hollywood Bowl	March 26, 2025		
Snow White	March 21, 2025		
Novocaine	March 14, 2025		
Mickey 17	March 7, 2025		
Harry Potter and the Goblet of Fire	March 2, 2025	Re-release.	
Harry Potter and the Prisoner of Azkaban	March 1, 2025	Re-release.	
Harry Potter and the Chamber of Secrets	February 28, 2025	Re-release.	
Mobile Suit Gundam GQuuuuuuX: Beginning	February 22, 2025	Japan only.	
Captain America: Brave New World	February 14, 2025	In 3D and 2D.	
Love Hurts	February 7, 2025		
IU Concert: The Winning	February 5, 2025		
Dog Man	January 31, 2025		
Ne Zha 2	January 29, 2025	In 3D and 2D; selected territories.	
Creation of the Gods II: Demon Force	January 29, 2025	Selected territories.	
Flight Risk	January 24, 2025		
Wolf Man	January 17, 2025		

=== 2024 ===
Name	Release date	Notes	Ref.
Mufasa: The Lion King	December 20, 2024	In 3D and 2D.	
Sonic the Hedgehog 3	December 20, 2024		
The Polar Express	December 16, 2024	20th Anniversary re-release; In 3D.	
Kraven the Hunter	December 13, 2024		
The Lord of the Rings: The War of the Rohirrim	December 13, 2024		
Pushpa 2: The Rule	December 5, 2024	In 3D and 2D.	
Moana 2	November 27, 2024	In 3D and 2D.	
Wicked	November 22, 2024	In 3D and 2D.	
Gladiator II	November 22, 2024		
Red One	November 15, 2024		
Attack on Titan: The Last Attack	November 8, 2024		
Paddington in Peru	November 8, 2024	UK and Australia only.	
Venom: The Last Dance	October 25, 2024	In 3D and 2D.	
King of Prism: Dramatic Prism.1	October 25, 2024		
Smile 2	October 18, 2024		
Joker: Folie à Deux	October 4, 2024		
Devara: Part 1	September 27, 2024		
The Wild Robot	September 27, 2024	In 3D and 2D.	
Transformers One	September 20, 2024	In 3D.	
Beetlejuice Beetlejuice	September 6, 2024		
Twister	August 30, 2024	Re-release.	
The Crow	August 23, 2024		
Alien: Romulus	August 16, 2024		
Borderlands	August 9, 2024		
My Hero Academia: You're Next	August 2, 2024		
Blackpink World Tour: Born Pink in Cinemas	July 31, 2024		
Deadpool & Wolverine	July 26, 2024	In 3D and 2D.	
Twisters	July 19, 2024		
Despicable Me 4	July 3, 2024	In 3D and 2D.	
A Quiet Place: Day One	June 28, 2024		
The Lord of the Rings: The Return of the King	June 24, 2024	Re-release.	
The Lord of the Rings: The Two Towers	June 23, 2024	Re-release.	
The Lord of the Rings: The Fellowship of the Ring	June 22, 2024	Re-release.	
Inside Out 2	June 14, 2024	In 3D and 2D.	
Bad Boys: Ride or Die	June 7, 2024		
The Garfield Movie	May 24, 2024	In 3D and 2D.	
Furiosa: A Mad Max Saga	May 24, 2024		
Kingdom of the Planet of the Apes	May 10, 2024		
The Fall Guy	May 3, 2024		
Star Wars: Episode I - The Phantom Menace	May 3, 2024	25th Anniversary re-release.	
Aespa: World Tour in Cinemas	April 24, 2024		
Abigail	April 19, 2024		
Civil War	rowspan="2" 12 April 2024	rowspan="2"	
Detective Conan: The Million Dollar Pentagram			
Dancing Village: The Curse Begins	April 11, 2024		
Godzilla x Kong: The New Empire	March 29, 2024	In 3D and 2D.	
Ghostbusters: Frozen Empire	March 22, 2024		
Love Live! The School Idol Movie	March 15, 2024	Re-release; Japan only.	
Kung Fu Panda 4	March 8, 2024	In 3D.	
Dune: Part Two	March 1, 2024		
Madame Web	February 14, 2024		
Spy × Family Code: White	February 10, 2024	Originally released in 2023.	
Demon Slayer: Kimetsu no Yaiba – To the Hashira Training	February 2, 2024		
Argylle	February 2, 2024		
Fighter	January 25, 2024	In 3D and 2D.	
The Beekeeper	January 12, 2024		
Night Swim	January 5, 2024		

=== 2023 ===
Name	Release date	Notes	Ref.
Aquaman and the Lost Kingdom	December 22, 2023	In 3D and 2D.	
Migration	December 22, 2023	In 3D and 2D.	
Wonka	December 15, 2023		
NCT Nation: To the World in Cinemas	December 6, 2023		
War On Terror: KL Anarchy	November 23, 2023		
Napoleon	November 22, 2023		
Wish	November 22, 2023	In 3D and 2D.	
The Hunger Games: The Ballad of Songbirds & Snakes	November 17, 2023		
Trolls Band Together	November 17, 2023	In 3D and 2D.	
The Marvels	November 10, 2023	In 3D and 2D.	
Godzilla Minus One	November 3, 2023		
Gurren Lagann The Movie: The Lights in the Sky are Stars	October 20, 2023	Re-release.	
Tim Burton's The Nightmare Before Christmas	October 20, 2023	30th Anniversary re-release; In 3D and 2D.	
Gurren Lagann The Movie: Childhood's End	October 6, 2023	Re-release.	
The Exorcist: Believer	October 6, 2023		
Saw X	September 29, 2023		
The Creator	September 29, 2023		
Expend4bles	September 22, 2023		
Barbie	September 15, 2023	Re-release.	
The Nun II	September 8, 2023		
Jawan	September 8, 2023	Selected territories.	
The Equalizer 3	September 1, 2023		
Gran Turismo	August 25, 2023		
MALBATT: Misi Bakara	August 24, 2023		
Blue Beetle	August 18, 2023		
Meg 2: The Trench	August 4, 2023	In 3D.	
Teenage Mutant Ninja Turtles: Mutant Mayhem	August 2, 2023	In 3D and 2D.	
Haunted Mansion	July 28, 2023		
Creation of the Gods I: Kingdom of Storms	July 20, 2023	Selected territories.	
Mission: Impossible – Dead Reckoning Part One	July 12, 2023		
Ladybug and Cat Noir: The Movie	July 5, 2023	France and selected territories only.	
Indiana Jones and the Dial of Destiny	June 30, 2023		
Elemental	June 16, 2023	In 3D and 2D.	
The Flash	June 16, 2023		
Transformers: Rise of the Beasts	June 9, 2023	In 3D and 2D.	
Spider-Man: Across the Spider-Verse	June 2, 2023		
The Little Mermaid	May 26, 2023	In 3D and 2D.	
Fast X	May 19, 2023	In 3D and 2D.	
Guardians of the Galaxy Vol. 3	May 5, 2023	In 3D and 2D.	
Ponniyin Selvan: II	April 28, 2023	Selected territories.	
Coldplay – Music of the Spheres: Live at River Plate	April 19, 2023		
Detective Conan: Black Iron Submarine	April 14, 2023		
The Super Mario Bros. Movie	April 5, 2023	In 3D.	
The Three Musketeers: D'Artagnan	April 5, 2023		
Dungeons & Dragons: Honor Among Thieves	March 31, 2023		
John Wick: Chapter 4	March 24, 2023		
Shazam! Fury of the Gods	March 17, 2023		
Shin Kamen Rider	March 17, 2023		
Scream VI	March 10, 2023	In 3D and 2D.	
Creed III	March 3, 2023		
Ant-Man and the Wasp: Quantumania	February 17, 2023	In 3D and 2D.	
James Cameron's Titanic	February 10, 2023	25th Anniversary re-release; In 3D and 2D.	
BTS: Yet To Come in Cinemas	February 1, 2023		
Pathaan	January 25, 2023	Selected territories.	
The Wandering Earth 2	January 22, 2023	In 3D and 2D. Selected territories.	

=== 2022 ===
Name	Release date	Notes	Ref.
Avatar: The Way of Water	December 16, 2022	In 3D.	
NCT Dream The Movie: In a Dream	November 30, 2022		
Strange World	November 23, 2022	In 3D and 2D.	
Black Panther: Wakanda Forever	November 11, 2022	In 3D and 2D.	
Black Adam	October 21, 2022		
Halloween Ends	October 14, 2022		
Poltergeist	October 7, 2022	40th Anniversary re-release.	
Lyle, Lyle, Crocodile	October 7, 2022		
James Cameron's Avatar	September 23, 2022	Re-release; In 3D.	
The Woman King	September 16, 2022		
Brahmāstra: Part One – Shiva	September 9, 2022	In 3D and 2D.	
Air Force The Movie: Selagi Bernyawa	August 25, 2022		
One Piece Film: Red	August 6, 2022		
Bullet Train	August 5, 2022		
Emergency Declaration	August 3, 2022		
DC League of Super-Pets	July 29, 2022		
Hansan: Rising Dragon	July 27, 2022		
Alienoid	July 22, 2022		
Nope	July 22, 2022		
Thor: Love and Thunder	July 8, 2022	In 3D and 2D.	
Minions: The Rise of Gru	July 1, 2022	In 3D and 2D.	
Lightyear	June 17, 2022	In 3D and 2D.	
Dragon Ball Super: Super Hero	June 11, 2022		
Jurassic World: Dominion	June 10, 2022	In 3D and 2D.	
Top Gun: Maverick	May 27, 2022		
Doctor Strange in the Multiverse of Madness	May 6, 2022	In 3D and 2D.	
The Northman	April 22, 2022		
Fantastic Beasts: The Secrets of Dumbledore	April 15, 2022		
Detective Conan: The Bride of Halloween	April 15, 2022		
Ambulance	April 8, 2022		
Sonic the Hedgehog 2	April 8, 2022		
Morbius	April 1, 2022		
The Lost City	March 25, 2022		
The Batman	March 4, 2022		
Uncharted	February 18, 2022		
Jujutsu Kaisen 0	February 5, 2022		
Jackass Forever	February 4, 2022		
Moonfall	February 3, 2022		
Scream	January 14, 2022		

=== 2021 ===
Name	Release date	Notes	Ref.
Sing 2	December 22, 2021	In 3D and 2D.	
The Matrix Resurrections	December 22, 2021		
The King's Man	December 22, 2021		
Spider-Man: No Way Home	December 15, 2021	In 3D and 2D.	
Encanto	November 24, 2021	In 3D and 2D.	
Resident Evil: Welcome to Raccoon City	November 24, 2021		
Ghostbusters: Afterlife	November 19, 2021		
Eternals	November 5, 2021	In 3D and 2D.	
Dune	October 22, 2021	In 3D and 2D.	
Venom: Let There Be Carnage	October 1, 2021	In 3D and 2D.	
No Time To Die	September 30, 2021	In 3D and 2D.	
Shang-Chi and the Legend of the Ten Rings	September 3, 2021	In 3D and 2D.	
Free Guy	August 13, 2021	In 3D and 2D.	
The Suicide Squad	August 6, 2021		
Blackpink: The Movie	August 4, 2021		
Jungle Cruise	July 30, 2021	In 3D and 2D.	
Escape from Mogadishu	July 28, 2021	South Korea only.	
Snake Eyes: G.I. Joe Creations	July 23, 2021		
The Fast and the Furious	July 16, 2021	20th Anniversary re-release.	
Space Jam: A New Legacy	July 16, 2021		
Black Widow	July 7, 2021	In 3D and 2D.	
F9: The Fast Saga	June 24, 2021	In 3D and 2D.	
Hitman's Wife's Bodyguard	June 16, 2021		
The Conjuring: The Devil Made Me Do It	June 4, 2021		
Spirit Untamed	June 4, 2021		
A Quiet Place Part II	May 28, 2021		
Spiral: From the Book of Saw	May 14, 2021		
Mortal Kombat	April 23, 2021		
Detective Conan: The Scarlet Bullet	April 16, 2021	Japan only.	
Godzilla vs. Kong	March 31, 2021	In 3D and 2D.	
Evangelion: 3.0+1.0 Thrice Upon a Time	March 8, 2021	Japan only.	
Chaos Walking	March 5, 2021		
Raya and the Last Dragon	March 5, 2021	In 3D and 2D.	
Raiders of the Lost Ark	March 5, 2021	40th Anniversary re-release.	
Tom and Jerry	February 26, 2021		

=== 2020 ===
Name	Release date	Notes	Ref.
Wonder Woman 1984	December 25, 2020	In 3D and 2D.	
Mulan	September 5, 2020	In 3D and 2D.	
The New Mutants	August 28, 2020		
Tenet	August 26, 2020		
The Dark Knight Rises	July 2, 2020	Re-release.	
The Dark Knight	July 2, 2020	Re-release.	
Batman Begins	July 2, 2020	Re-release.	
Trolls World Tour	April 10, 2020 (Note: The film was originally planned to be released theatrically in the United States on this date. However, on March 16, Universal Pictures announced that the film would be released simultaneously in drive-in theaters, as regular movie theaters closed due to the restrictions caused by the COVID-19 pandemic, and through Premium VOD in the United States, Canada, United Kingdom, South Korea and Italy. This affected the number of projections and the box office performance of the 4Dx screenings. As the pandemic receded, the film was released back in regular theatres.)	In 3D and 2D.	
Connected	May 1, 2020 (Note: By March 18, 2020, the screening of this film in the United States was almost exclusively available in some drive-in theaters due to movie theaters closures because of the COVID-19 pandemic restrictions and as result, Sony Pictures announced on this day that on March 24, 2020 the film was available digitally through Premium VOD in the United States and Canada. This affected the number of projections and the box office performance of the 4Dx screenings. As the pandemic receded, the film was released back in regular theatres.)		
Onward	March 6, 2020 (Note: Due to movie theaters closures because of the COVID-19 pandemic, the film was released digitally in the United States and Canada through Premium VOD on the night of March 20, 2020 and became available for Disney+ subscribers on April 3, 2020 in the United States and Canada. This affected the number of projections and the box office performance of the 4Dx screenings. As the pandemic receded, the film was released back in regular theatres.)	In 3D and 2D.	
Sonic the Hedgehog	February 14, 2020		
Birds of Prey	February 7, 2020		
My Hero Academia: Heroes Rising	January 24, 2020	Selected territories.	
Summer Wars	January 17, 2020	Re-release; Japan only.	
Bad Boys for Life	January 17, 2020		
Dolittle	January 17, 2020	In 3D and 2D.	
1917	January 10, 2020		

=== 2019 ===
Name	Release date	Notes	Ref.
Spies in Disguise	December 25, 2019	In 3D and 2D.	
Star Wars: The Rise of Skywalker	December 20, 2019	In 3D and 2D.	
Jumanji: The Next Level	December 13, 2019	In 3D and 2D.	
Gremlins	December 6, 2019	35th Anniversary re-release.	
Lupin III: The First	December 6, 2019		
Charlie's Angels	November 29, 2019		
Frozen 2	November 22, 2019	In 3D and 2D.	
WIRA	November 21, 2019	First Malaysian 4DX film.	
Ford v Ferrari	November 15, 2019		
Midway	November 8, 2019		
Terminator: Dark Fate	November 8, 2019		
Promare	October 18, 2019	Limited re-release.	
Maleficent: Mistress of Evil	October 18, 2019	In 3D and 2D.	
Gemini Man	October 11, 2019	In 3D and 2D.	
Zombieland: Double Tap	October 11, 2019		
War	October 2, 2019		
Weathering With You	September 27, 2019	Limited release.	
Abominable	September 27, 2019	In 3D and 2D.	
Rambo: Last Blood	September 20, 2019		
Ad Astra	September 20, 2019		
It Chapter 2	September 6, 2019		
Detective Conan: The Fist of Blue Sapphire	August 23, 2019		
The Angry Birds Movie 2	August 14, 2019	In 3D and 2D.	
Dora and the Lost City of Gold	August 9, 2019		
The Lion King	July 19, 2019	In 3D and 2D.	
The Matrix	July 17, 2019	20th Anniversary re-release.	
Crawl	July 12, 2019	Selected territories.	
Spider-Man: Far From Home	July 2, 2019	In 3D and 2D.	
Annabelle Comes Home	June 26, 2019		
Grudge	June 21, 2019		
Toy Story 4	June 21, 2019	In 3D.	
Men in Black: International	June 14, 2019	In 3D and 2D.	
Dark Phoenix	June 7, 2019	In 3D and 2D.	
Godzilla: King of the Monsters	May 31, 2019	In 3D and 2D.	
Aladdin	May 24, 2019	In 3D and 2D.	
Brightburn	May 24, 2019		
The Secret Life of Pets 2	May 24, 2019	In 3D and 2D.	
John Wick: Chapter 3 – Parabellum	May 17, 2019		
Pokémon: Detective Pikachu	May 10, 2019	In 3D and 2D.	
Avengers: Endgame	April 26, 2019	In 3D and 2D.	
The Intruder	April 26, 2019		
The Curse of La Llorona	April 19, 2019		
Hellboy	April 12, 2019		
Shazam!	April 5, 2019	In 3D and 2D.	
Dumbo	March 29, 2019	In 3D and 2D.	
Wonder Park	March 15, 2019	In 3D and 2D.	
Captain Marvel	March 8, 2019	In 3D and 2D.	
How to Train Your Dragon: The Hidden World	February 22, 2019	In 3D and 2D.	
Alita: Battle Angel	February 14, 2019	In 3D and 2D.	
The Lego Movie 2: The Second Part	February 8, 2019	In 3D and 2D.	
Cold Pursuit	February 8, 2019		
Miss Bala	February 1, 2019		
The Kid Who Would Be King	January 25, 2019		
Glass	January 18, 2019		
122	January 9, 2019	Middle East only.	
Escape Room	January 4, 2019		

=== 2018 ===
Name	Release date	Notes	Ref.
Aquaman	December 21, 2018	In 3D and 2D.	
Bumblebee	December 21, 2018	In 3D and 2D.	
Mary Poppins Returns	December 19, 2018		
Dragon Ball Super: Broly	December 14, 2018	Selected territories.	
Mortal Engines	December 14, 2018	In 3D and 2D.	
Spider-Man: Into the Spider-Verse	December 14, 2018	In 3D and 2D.	
Robin Hood	November 21, 2018		
Ralph Breaks the Internet	November 21, 2018	In 3D and 2D.	
Fantastic Beasts: The Crimes of Grindelwald	November 16, 2018	In 3D and 2D.	
Dr. Seuss' The Grinch	November 9, 2018	In 3D and 2D.	
Overlord	November 9, 2018		
Thugs of Hindostan	November 8, 2018	Selected territories.	
The Nutcracker and the Four Realms	November 2, 2018	In 3D and 2D.	
Bohemian Rhapsody	November 2, 2018		
Hunter Killer	October 26, 2018		
Harry Potter and the Philosopher's Stone	October 26, 2018	In 3D and 2D. Re-release.	
Detective Conan: Zero the Enforcer	October 19, 2018		
Goosebumps 2: Haunted Halloween	October 12, 2018		
First Man	October 12, 2018		
Venom	October 5, 2018	In 3D and 2D.	
Alad'2	October 3, 2018	France only.	
Hell Fest	September 28, 2018	Selected territories.	
Smallfoot	September 28, 2018	In 3D and 2D.	
The House with a Clock in its Walls	September 21, 2018	In 3D and 2D.	
The Predator	September 14, 2018	In 3D and 2D.	
Monstrum	September 12, 2018	South Korea only.	
The Nun	September 7, 2018		
Kin	August 31, 2018	Selected territories.	
Mile 22	August 17, 2018		
Alpha	August 17, 2018	In 3D and 2D.	
Slender Man	August 10, 2018		
The Meg	August 10, 2018	In 3D and 2D.	
The Darkest Minds	August 3, 2018		
Mission: Impossible – Fallout	July 27, 2018	In 3D and 2D.	
The Equalizer 2	July 20, 2018		
Hotel Transylvania 3: Summer Vacation	July 13, 2018	In 3D and 2D.	
Skyscraper	July 13, 2018	In 3D and 2D.	
Ant-Man and the Wasp	July 6, 2018	In 3D and 2D.	
Sicario: Day of the Soldado	June 29, 2018		
Redbad	June 28, 2018	First 4DX film in Dutch; Netherlands only.	
Jurassic World: Fallen Kingdom	June 22, 2018	In 3D and 2D.	
Incredibles 2	June 15, 2018	In 3D and 2D.	
Solo: A Star Wars Story	May 25, 2018	In 3D and 2D.	
Deadpool 2	May 18, 2018		
Avengers: Infinity War	April 27, 2018	In 3D and 2D. First 4DX film in Ireland.	
Rampage	April 13, 2018	In 3D and 2D.	
Taxi 5	April 11, 2018	France only.	
Ready Player One	March 29, 2018	In 3D and 2D.	
Pacific Rim Uprising	March 23, 2018	In 3D and 2D.	
Tomb Raider	March 16, 2018	In 3D and 2D.	
A Wrinkle in Time	March 9, 2018	In 3D and 2D.	
Black Panther	February 16, 2018	In 3D and 2D.	
Detective Conan: The Darkest Nightmare	February 10, 2018		
Peter Rabbit	February 9, 2018		
Maze Runner: The Death Cure	January 26, 2018	In 3D and 2D.	
Mazinger Z: Infinity	January 13, 2018		
The Commuter	January 12, 2018		

=== 2017 ===
Name	Release date	Notes	Ref.
Jumanji: Welcome to the Jungle	December 20, 2017	In 3D and 2D.	
Ferdinand	December 15, 2017	In 3D and 2D.	
Star Wars: The Last Jedi	December 15, 2017	In 3D and 2D. First 4DX film in Spain, Belgium, and The Netherlands.	
Coco	November 22, 2017	In 3D and 2D.	
Justice League	November 13, 2017	In 3D and 2D.	
Thor: Ragnarok	November 3, 2017	In 3D and 2D. First 4DX film in Australia.	
Geostorm	October 20, 2017	In 3D and 2D.	
Blade Runner 2049	October 6, 2017	In 3D and 2D.	
The Lego Ninjago Movie	September 22, 2017	In 3D and 2D.	
Kingsman: The Golden Circle	September 20, 2017	In 3D and 2D.	
King of Prism: Pride the Hero	August 26, 2017		
Terminator 2: Judgment Day	August 25, 2017	In 3D.	
War for the Planet of the Apes	August 18, 2017	In 3D and 2D.	
Wolf Warrior 2	August 14, 2017	In 3D. Selected territories.	
Wu Kong	August 13, 2017	In 3D and 2D. Selected territories.	
Annabelle: Creation	August 11, 2017		
Baby Driver	July 28, 2017		
The Emoji Movie	July 28, 2017	In 3D and 2D.	
Dunkirk	July 21, 2017		
Valerian and the City of a Thousand Planets	July 21, 2017	In 3D and 2D.	
Spider-Man: Homecoming	July 7, 2017	In 3D and 2D.	
Despicable Me 3	June 30, 2017	In 3D and 2D.	
Transformers: The Last Knight	June 21, 2017	In 3D and 2D.	
Cars 3	June 16, 2017	In 3D and 2D.	
The Mummy	June 9, 2017	In 3D and 2D.	
Wonder Woman	June 2, 2017	In 3D and 2D.	
Captain Underpants: The First Epic Movie	June 2, 2017	In 3D and 2D.	
Alien: Covenant	May 19, 2017		
Guardians of the Galaxy Vol. 2	May 5, 2017	In 3D and 2D.	
The Fate of the Furious	April 14, 2017		
Smurfs: The Lost Village	April 7, 2017	In 3D and 2D.	
Beauty and the Beast	March 17, 2017	In 3D and 2D.	
Kong: Skull Island	March 10, 2017	In 3D and 2D.	
Logan	March 3, 2017	In 3D and 2D.	
Guardians	February 23, 2017		
The Worthy	February 23, 2017	First 4DX film in Arabic. Selected territories.	
The Lego Batman Movie	February 10, 2017	In 3D and 2D.	
Sword Art Online The Movie: Ordinal Scale	February 10, 2017	Japan only.	

=== 2016 ===
Name	Release date	Notes	Ref.
Railroad Tigers	December 23, 2016		
Assassin's Creed	December 21, 2016	In 3D and 2D.	
Passengers	December 21, 2016	In 3D and 2D.	
Sing	December 21, 2016	In 3D and 2D.	
Rogue One: A Star Wars Story	December 16, 2016	In 3D and 2D.	
Pandora	December 7, 2016		
Missing	November 30, 2016		
KanColle: The Movie	November 26, 2016	Japan only.	
Moana	November 23, 2016	In 3D and 2D.	
Underworld: Blood Wars	November 24, 2016	In 3D and 2D.	
Fantastic Beasts and Where to Find Them	November 18, 2016	In 3D and 2D.	
Trolls	November 4, 2016	In 3D and 2D.	
Doctor Strange	November 4, 2016	In 3D and 2D. First 4DX film in Canada.	
Inferno	October 28, 2016	In 3D and 2D.	
Jack Reacher: Never Go Back	October 21, 2016		
Heartfall Arises	October 20, 2016	In 3D. Selected territories.	
The Accountant	October 14, 2016		
Gantz: O	October 14, 2016	Japan only.	
Operation Mekong	September 30, 2016		
Deepwater Horizon	September 30, 2016		
Miss Peregrine's Home for Peculiar Children	September 30, 2016	In 3D and 2D.	
Storks	September 23, 2016	In 3D and 2D.	
The Magnificent Seven	September 23, 2016		
The Housemaid	September 16, 2016	In 3D and 2D; in Vietnam.	
Blair Witch	September 16, 2016		
The Age of Shadows	September 7, 2016		
Don't Breathe	August 26, 2016		
Mechanic: Resurrection	August 26, 2016		
Ben-Hur	August 19, 2016	In 3D and 2D.	
The Tenants Downstairs	August 12, 2016	Selected territories.	
Suicide Squad	August 5, 2016	In 3D and 2D.	
Jason Bourne	July 29, 2016	In 3D and 2D.	
Shin Godzilla	July 29, 2016		
Nerve	July 27, 2016		
One Piece Film: Gold	July 23, 2016	In 3D and 2D.	
Star Trek Beyond	July 22, 2016	In 3D and 2D.	
Ice Age: Collision Course	July 22, 2016	In 3D and 2D.	
Skiptrace	July 21, 2016	In 3D and 2D. Selected territories.	
Train to Busan	July 20, 2016		
Ghostbusters	July 15, 2016	In 3D and 2D.	
For a Few Bullets	July 15, 2016		
The Secret Life of Pets	July 8, 2016	In 3D and 2D.	
The Legend of Tarzan	July 1, 2016	In 3D and 2D.	
The BFG	July 1, 2016	In 3D and 2D.	
Independence Day: Resurgence	June 24, 2016	In 3D and 2D.	
King of Prism by PrettyRhythm	June 18, 2016		
Central Intelligence	June 17, 2016		
Finding Dory	June 17, 2016	In 3D and 2D.	
Warcraft	June 10, 2016	In 3D and 2D.	
Teenage Mutant Ninja Turtles: Out of the Shadows	June 3, 2016	In 3D and 2D. First 4DX film in Puerto Rico and Kuwait.	
X-Men: Apocalypse	May 27, 2016	In 3D and 2D.	
Alice Through the Looking Glass	May 27, 2016	In 3D and 2D.	
The Angry Birds Movie	May 20, 2016	In 3D and 2D.	
Now You See Me 2	May 10, 2016		
Captain America: Civil War	May 6, 2016	In 3D and 2D.	
Sheep and Wolves	April 28, 2016	In 3D and 2D. Selected territories.	
Yu-Gi-Oh!: The Dark Side of Dimensions	April 23, 2016	Selected territories.	
The Huntsman: Winter's War	April 22, 2016	In 3D and 2D.	
The Jungle Book	April 15, 2016	In 3D and 2D.	
Robinson Crusoe	March 30, 2016	In 3D and 2D. Selected territories.	
Batman v Superman: Dawn of Justice	March 25, 2016	In 3D and 2D.	
The Divergent Series: Allegiant	March 18, 2016	In 3D and 2D.	
10 Cloverfield Lane	March 11, 2016		
London Has Fallen	March 4, 2016		
Zootopia	March 4, 2016	In 3D and 2D.	
Gods of Egypt	February 26, 2016	In 3D and 2D.	
Grimsby	February 24, 2016		
Crouching Tiger, Hidden Dragon: Sword of Destiny	February 18, 2016	In 3D and 2D. Selected territories.	
Deadpool	February 12, 2016		
The Monkey King 2: The Legend Begins	February 6, 2016	In 3D and 2D. Selected territories.	
Pride and Prejudice and Zombies	February 5, 2016		
The Finest Hours	January 29, 2016	In 3D and 2D.	
Kung Fu Panda 3	January 29, 2016	In 3D and 2D.	
The 5th Wave	January 22, 2016		
King of Prism by Pretty Rhythm	January 9, 2016		

=== 2015 ===
Film title	Distribution/Production company(s)	Country(s) of Origin	Notes	Ref.
Home	20th Century Fox / DreamWorks Animation	United States	In 3D.	
The Martian	20th Century Fox / Scott Free Productions	United Kingdom; United States	In 3D.	
Star Wars: The Force Awakens	Lucasfilm Ltd. / Bad Robot / Walt Disney Studios Motion Pictures	United States	In 3D.	
Mission: Impossible – Rogue Nation	Paramount Pictures / Skydance Productions / Bad Robot	United States		
The Peanuts Movie	20th Century Fox / Blue Sky Studios	United States	In 3D.	
The Good Dinosaur	Walt Disney Pictures / Pixar Animation Studios	United States	In 3D.	
Minions	Universal Pictures / Illumination Entertainment	United States	In 3D.	
Jurassic World	Universal Pictures / Amblin Entertainment / Legendary Pictures	United States	In 3D.	
Tomorrowland	Walt Disney Pictures	United States		
Avengers: Age of Ultron	Marvel Studios / Walt Disney Studios Motion Pictures	United States	In 3D.	
San Andreas	Warner Bros. Pictures / New Line Cinema / Village Roadshow Pictures	United States	In 3D.	
Furious 7	Universal Pictures / Original Film	United States		
The Walk	TriStar Pictures / ImageMovers	United States	In 3D.	
Jupiter Ascending	Warner Bros. Pictures / Village Roadshow Pictures / RatPac Entertainment	United States; Australia	In 3D.	
Seventh Son	Universal Pictures / Legendary Pictures	United States	In 3D.	
Paddington	TWC-Dimension / Heyday Films / StudioCanal	United Kingdom		
Inside Out	Walt Disney Pictures / Pixar Animation Studios	United States	In 3D.	
Taken 3	20th Century Fox / EuropaCorp	United States; France	In 3D and 2D.	
Project Almanac	Paramount Pictures / MTV Films / Insurge Pictures	United States		
Kingsman: The Secret Service	20th Century Fox / Marv Films	United Kingdom; United States	In 3D and 2D. First 4DX film in the United Kingdom.	
In the Heart of the Sea	Warner Bros. Pictures / Village Roadshow Pictures / Imagine Entertainment / RatPac Entertainment / Roth Films	United States	In 3D.	
Everest	Universal Pictures / Cross Creek Pictures / Walden Media / Working Title Films	United Kingdom; United States	In 3D.	
Goosebumps	Columbia Pictures / Sony Pictures Animation / Village Roadshow Pictures / Original Film	United States	In 3D.	
Terminator Genysis	Paramount Pictures / Skydance Productions	United States	In 3D.	
Pixels	Columbia Pictures / Happy Madison Productions / 1492 Pictures	United States	In 3D.	

=== 2014 ===
Film title	Distribution/Production company(s)	Country(s) of Origin	Notes	Ref.
The Amazing Spider-Man 2	Columbia Pictures / Marvel Entertainment	United States	In 3D. First 4DX film in the Philippines.	
Noah	Paramount Pictures / Regency Enterprises / Protozoa Pictures	United States	In 3D.	
Captain America: The Winter Soldier	Marvel Studios / Walt Disney Studios Motion Pictures	United States	In 3D. First 4DX film in the United States.	
Need for Speed	Touchstone Pictures / DreamWorks Pictures / Electronic Arts	United States	In 3D.	
Non-Stop	Universal Pictures / StudioCanal / Silver Pictures	United Kingdom; France; United States		
RoboCop	Columbia Pictures / Metro-Goldwyn-Mayer	United States	In 3D and 2D.	
Tarzan	Summit Entertainment / Constantin Film	United States; Germany	In 3D. First 4DX film in the United Arab Emirates.	
Jack Ryan: Shadow Recruit	Paramount Pictures / Skydance Productions	United States		
I, Frankenstein	Lionsgate	United States; Australia	In 3D.	
Legends of Oz: Dorothy's Return	Prana Studios / Summertime Entertainment / Clarius Entertainment	United States	In 3D.	
The Monkey King	Filmko Entertainment / Mandarin Films Distribution Co. Ltd. / China Film Group	China; Hong Kong	In 3D.	
Viy 3D	Event Film Distribution / Russian Film Group / Universal Pictures International	Russia	In 3D.	
Paranormal Activity: The Marked Ones	Paramount Pictures / Blumhouse Productions	United States		
Pompeii	TriStar Pictures / FilmDistrict	United States	In 3D.	
Divergent	Summit Entertainment	United States		
The Legend of Hercules	Summit Entertainment / Millennium Films	United States	In 3D.	
Maleficent	Walt Disney Pictures / Roth Films	United States	In 3D.	
Edge of Tomorrow	Warner Bros. Pictures / Village Roadshow Pictures / RatPac Entertainment	United States	In 3D.	
Rio 2	20th Century Fox / Blue Sky Studios	United States	In 3D.	
Mr. Peabody & Sherman	DreamWorks Animation / Pacific Data Images (PDI) / Bullwinkle Studios	United States	In 3D.	
Transformers: Age of Extinction	Paramount Pictures / Hasbro	United States	In 3D.	
Godzilla	Warner Bros. Pictures / Legendary Pictures	United States	In 3D.	
Guardians of the Galaxy	Marvel Studios / Walt Disney Studios Motion Pictures	United States	In 3D.	
As the Light Goes Out	Emperor Motion Pictures / Media Asia Films	Hong Kong		
How To Train Your Dragon 2	DreamWorks Animation / 20th Century Fox	United States	In 3D.	
Appleseed Alpha	Lucent Pictures Entertainment / Sola Digital Arts	Japan		
Dawn of the Planet of the Apes	20th Century Fox / Chernin Entertainment	United States	In 3D.	
X-Men: Days of Future Past	20th Century Fox / Marvel Entertainment / Bad Hat Harry Productions	United States	In 3D.	
Hercules	Paramount Pictures / Metro-Goldwyn-Mayer / RatPac Entertainment	United States	In 3D.	
Teenage Mutant Ninja Turtles	Paramount Pictures / Nickelodeon Movies / Platinum Dunes	United States	In 3D.	
Step Up: All In	Summit Entertainment / Offspring Entertainment	United States	In 3D.	
The Admiral: Roaring Currents	CJ Entertainment	South Korea		
Lucy	EuropaCorp	France	In 3D and 2D.	
Exodus: Gods and Kings	20th Century Fox / Scott Free Productions / Chernin Entertainment	United States; United Kingdom	In 3D.	
Aftershock	Dimension Films / Radius-TWC	United States; Chile	First Chilean film in 4DX.	
The November Man	Relativity Media	United States		
Walking on Sunshine	Vertigo Films / IM Global	United Kingdom		
Saint Seiya: Legend of Sanctuary	Toei Company / Toei Animation	Japan		
The Expendables 3	Lionsgate / Millennium Films	United States		
Into the Storm	Warner Bros. Pictures / Village Roadshow Pictures / New Line Cinema	United States	In 3D.	
The Pyramid	20th Century Fox	United States		
The Book of Life	20th Century Fox / Reel FX Animation Studios	United States	In 3D.	
La Leyenda de las Momias de Guanajuato	Videocine / Ánima Estudios	Mexico	First Mexican animated film in 4DX.	
Fury	Columbia Pictures / QED International	United States		
John Wick	Summit Entertainment / Thunder Road Pictures	United States		
The Maze Runner	20th Century Fox	United States	First 4DX film in Costa Rica.	
The Equalizer	Columbia Pictures / Village Roadshow Pictures / Escape Artists	United States		
Autómata	Millennium Entertainment	Spain; Bulgaria		
Black & White: The Dawn of Justice	China Film Group Corporation	China; Taiwan		
Kill Dil	Yash Raj Films	India	First Indian film in 4DX.	
New Initial D the Movie	Avex Entertainment / Sanzigen	Japan		
Big Hero 6	Walt Disney Pictures / Walt Disney Animation Studios	United States	In 3D.	
The Hunger Games: Mockingjay – Part 1	Lionsgate / Color Force	United States		
Interstellar	Paramount Pictures / Warner Bros. Pictures / Legendary Pictures / Syncopy	United States; United Kingdom		
Penguins of Madagascar	20th Century Fox / DreamWorks Animation / Pacific Data Images (PDI)	United States	In 3D.	
Night at the Museum: Secret of the Tomb	20th Century Fox / 1492 Pictures	United States		
The Hobbit: The Battle of the Five Armies	Warner Bros. Pictures / New Line Cinema / Metro-Goldwyn-Mayer / WingNut Films	United States; New Zealand	In 3D.	
Gone with the Bullets	Beijing Bu Yi Le Hu Film Company / Emperor Motion Pictures	China		
Attack on Titan: Guren no Yumiya	Pony Canyon	Japan		
The Raid 2	PT. Merantau Films / Stage 6 Films / XYZ Films	Indonesia	First Indonesian film in 4DX.	

=== 2013 ===
Film title	Distribution/Production company(s)	Country(s) of Origin	Notes
Frozen	Walt Disney Pictures / Walt Disney Animation Studios	United States	First 4DX film in Venezuela. In 3D.
Gravity	Warner Bros. Pictures / Esperanto Filmoj / Heyday Films	United States; United Kingdom	In 3D.
The Hobbit: The Desolation of Smaug	Warner Bros. Pictures / Metro-Goldwyn-Mayer / New Line Cinema	New Zealand; United Kingdom; United States; Croatia	First 4DX film in Ukraine and Guatemala. In 3D.
Hansel and Gretel: Witch Hunters	Paramount Pictures / Metro-Goldwyn-Mayer / MTV Films	United States; Germany	In 3D.
Jack Reacher	Paramount Pictures / Skydance Productions / TC Productions	United States	
Beautiful Creatures	Warner Bros. Pictures / Summit Entertainment / Alcon Entertainment	United States	
Upside Down	Warner Bros. Pictures France / Lionsgate UK / Samuel Goldwyn Films / Millennium Films	France; Canada	In 3D.
The Last Stand	Lionsgate	United States	
Planes	Walt Disney Pictures / DisneyToon Studios / Prana Studios	United States	In 3D.
Free Birds	Relativity Media / Reel FX Animation Studios	United States	In 3D.
Cirque du Soleil: Worlds Away	Paramount Pictures / Cirque du Soleil / Reel FX Creative Studios / Strange Weather Films	United States	In 3D.
A Good Day to Die Hard	20th Century Fox / Dune Entertainment	United States; Hungary	
The Croods	20th Century Fox / DreamWorks Animation	United States	First 4DX film in Hungary and Europe. In 3D.
G.I. Joe: Retaliation	Paramount Pictures / Metro-Goldwyn-Mayer / Skydance Productions / Hasbro	United States	In 3D.
Oblivion	Universal Pictures / Chernin Entertainment / Relativity Media	United States	
Iron Man 3	Paramount Pictures / Marvel Studios / Walt Disney Studios Motion Pictures	United States	First 4DX film in Japan. In 3D.
Pacific Rim	Warner Bros. Pictures / Legendary Pictures	United States	In 3D.
Star Trek Into Darkness	Bad Robot / K/O Paper Products / Skydance Productions / Paramount Pictures	United States	In 3D.
Epic	20th Century Fox / Blue Sky Studios	United States	In 3D.
Fast & Furious 6	One Race Films / Original Film / Universal Pictures	United States; Israel	First 4DX film in Bulgaria, Czech Republic, and Poland.
Man of Steel	Warner Bros. Pictures / Legendary Pictures / DC Entertainment / Syncopy / Peters Entertainment	United States	First 4DX film in Taiwan. In 3D.
Turbo	20th Century Fox / DreamWorks Animation	United States	First 4DX film in Chile. In 3D.
Despicable Me 2	Universal Pictures / Illumination Entertainment	United States	First 4DX film in Colombia. In 3D.
R.I.P.D.	Universal Pictures / Dark Horse Entertainment / Original Film	United States	In 3D.
Now You See Me	Summit Entertainment; K/O Paper Products	United States; France	
World War Z	Paramount Pictures / Plan B Entertainment / GK Films / Skydance Productions	United States; United Kingdom	In 3D.
The Lone Ranger	Jerry Bruckhemier Films / Walt Disney Pictures	United States	
The Wolverine	20th Century Fox / Marvel Entertainment / The Donners' Company	United States; United Kingdom	In 3D.
Man of Tai Chi	Universal Pictures / Village Roadshow Pictures / China Film Group / Company Films / Dalian Wanda Group	China	
Red 2	Summit Entertainment / DC Entertainment	United States	
Pee Mak	GMM Tai Hub / Jorkwang film	Thailand	First Thai film in 4DX.
Olympus Has Fallen	FilmDistrict / Millennium Films	United States	
Percy Jackson: Sea of Monsters	20th Century Fox / 1492 Pictures / Dune Entertainment	United States	First 4DX film in Indonesia. In 3D.
Mr. Go	Showbox / Mediaplex	South Korea; China	
Kick-Ass 2	Universal Pictures / Plan B Entertainment / Marv Films	United States; United Kingdom	
Jurassic Park 3D	Universal Pictures / Amblin Entertainment	United States	Re-released in 4DX in 2013. In 3D.
The Great Gatsby	Warner Bros. Pictures / Village Roadshow Pictures	United States	In 3D.
Rush	Universal Pictures / Exclusive Media / Revolution Films / Cross Creek Pictures / Working Title Films / Imagine Entertainment / Relativity Media	United States; United Kingdom	
Thor: The Dark World	Marvel Studios / Walt Disney Studios Motion Pictures	United States	In 3D.
The Mortal Instruments: City of Bones	Screen Gems / Constantin Film	United States; Germany; United Kingdom	
Cloudy with a Chance of Meatballs 2	Columbia Pictures / Sony Pictures Animation	United States	In 3D.
Mayday Nowhere 3D	Warner Bros. Pictures Taiwan	Taiwan	First Taiwanese film in 4DX. In 3D.
Sadako 3D	Kadokawa Pictures / Tohokushinsha Film Corporation	Japan	First Japanese film in 4DX. In 3D.
The Hunger Games: Catching Fire	Lionsgate / Color Force	United States	
Walking with Dinosaurs 3D	20th Century Fox / BBC Earth Films / Reliance Entertainment / IM Global	United States	In 3D.
47 Ronin	Universal Pictures / Bluegrass Films / Moving Picture Company (MPC)	United States	In 3D.
Jack the Giant Slayer	Warner Bros. Pictures / New Line Cinema / Legendary Pictures / Bad Hat Harry Productions	United States	In 3D.
Snowpiercer	CJ Entertainment	South Korea	In 3D.
Ender's Game	Summit Entertainment / OddLot Entertainment / K/O Paper Products / Digital Domain	United States	
Riddick	Universal Pictures / Entertainment One / One Race Films / Radar Pictures	United States; United Kingdom	
Snitch	Exclusive Media Group / Participant Media / Imagenation Abu Dhabi	United States; United Arab Emirates	
Monsters University	Walt Disney Pictures / Pixar Animation Studios	United States	In 3D.
The Smurfs 2	Columbia Pictures / Sony Pictures Animation / Kerner Entertainment Company	United States	In 3D.

== See also ==
- ScreenX
- List of ScreenX formatted films
- 4D film
