= 4XD =

4XD has been the call-sign of at least two radio stations:

- WBT (AM), Charlotte, North Carolina, United States - former call-sign
- Radio Dunedin, Dunedin, New Zealand

Similar

- 4DX and X4D are motion-picture technologies
