= List of ScreenX formatted films =

This is a list of films released in the ScreenX multi-screen format.

== Films released in ScreenX ==
=== 2027 ===
Name	Release date	Notes	Ref.
Avengers: Secret Wars	December 17, 2027		

=== 2026 ===
Name	Release date	Notes	Ref.
Avengers: Doomsday	December 18, 2026		
The Hunger Games: Sunrise on the Reaping	November 20, 2026		
Ramayana: Part 1	November 6, 2026		
Clayface	October 23, 2026		
Street Fighter	October 16, 2026		
Death Whisperer: Saming the Werebeast	September 30, 2026	The first Thai film to be shot for ScreenX	
Linkin Park: Unshatter	September 30, 2026		
Forgotten Island	September 25, 2026	CGI-animated film; In 3D and 2D.	
Avengers: Endgame - Encore	September 25, 2026	Re-release.	
Resident Evil	September 18, 2026		
The Dog Stars	August 28, 2026		
The End of Oak Street	August 14, 2026		
Spider-Man: Brand New Day	July 31, 2026	The first film to be Shot for ScreenX; In 3D and 2D.	
Hope	July 15, 2026		
Moana	July 10, 2026	In 3D and 2D.	
Minions & Monsters	July 1, 2026	CGI-animated film; In 3D and 2D.	
Supergirl	June 26, 2026	In 3D and 2D.	
Toy Story 5	June 19, 2026	CGI-animated film; In 3D and 2D.	
Masters of the Universe	June 5, 2026		
Peddi	June 4, 2026		
Star Wars: The Mandalorian and Grogu	May 22, 2026	In 3D and 2D.	
Top Gun	May 13, 2026	40th Anniversary re-release.	
Mortal Kombat II	May 8, 2026		
The Devil Wears Prada 2	May 1, 2026		
Cave of Forgotten Dreams 15th Anniversary IMAX Restoration Cave of Forgotten Dreams 15th Anniversary	April 26, 2026		
Michael	April 24, 2026		
Lee Cronin's The Mummy	April 17, 2026		
The Super Mario Galaxy Movie	April 1, 2026	CGI-animated film; In 3D and 2D.	
Project Hail Mary	March 20, 2026		
Scream 7	February 27, 2026		
Demon Slayer: Kimetsu no Yaiba – The Movie: Infinity Castle – Part 1: Akaza Returns	February 20, 2026	Re-release; Anime film.	
Infinite Icon: A Visual Memoir	January 30, 2026		
Send Help	January 30, 2026	In 3D and 2D.	
28 Years Later: The Bone Temple	January 16, 2026		

=== 2025 ===
Name	Release date	Notes	Ref.
Avatar: Fire and Ash	December 19, 2025	First ScreenX film to be presented in RealD 3D.	
Zootopia 2	November 26, 2025	CGI-animated film.	
Wicked: For Good	November 21, 2025		
Predator: Badlands	November 7, 2025		
Chainsaw Man - The Movie: Reze Arc	October 24, 2025	Anime film.	
Tron: Ares	October 10, 2025		
Kygo: Back at the Bowl	September 26, 2025		
The Conjuring: Last Rites	September 5, 2025		
Exit 8	August 29, 2025		
The Bad Guys 2	August 1, 2025	CGI-animated film.	
The Fantastic Four: First Steps	July 25, 2025		
Superman	July 11, 2025		
Jurassic World Rebirth	July 2, 2025		
F1	June 27, 2025		
28 Years Later	June 20, 2025		
How to Train Your Dragon	June 13, 2025		
Mission: Impossible – The Final Reckoning	May 23, 2025		
Project X	May 21, 2025		
Thunderbolts*	May 2, 2025		
Sinners	April 18, 2025		
A Minecraft Movie	April 4, 2025		
Imagine Dragons: Live from the Hollywood Bowl	March 26, 2025	Imagine Dragons	
Snow White	March 21, 2025		
Mickey 17	March 7, 2025		
Exorcism Chronicles: The Beginning	February 21, 2025	An anime film based on the 1993 South Korean web novel Toemarok by Lee Woo-hyeok.	
Captain America: Brave New World	February 14, 2025		
Dog Man	January 31, 2025	CGI-animated film.	
Dark Nuns	January 24, 2025		
IU Concert: The Winning	January 24, 2025	IU (singer)	

=== 2024 ===
Name	Release date	Notes	Ref.
Mufasa: The Lion King	December 20, 2024	CGI-animated film.	
Sonic the Hedgehog 3	December 20, 2024		
Kraven the Hunter	December 13, 2024		
Wicked	November 22, 2024		
Gladiator II	November 22, 2024		
Venom: The Last Dance	October 25, 2024		
Joker: Folie à Deux	October 4, 2024		
Devara: Part 1	September 27, 2024		
The Wild Robot	September 27, 2024	CGI-animated film.	
Beetlejuice Beetlejuice	September 6, 2024		
SEVENTEEN Tour 'FOLLOW' AGAIN to Cinemas	August 21, 2024	Seventeen (South Korean band)	
Alien: Romulus	August 16, 2024		
Blackpink World Tour [Born Pink] In Cinemas	July 31, 2024		
Deadpool & Wolverine	July 26, 2024		
Twisters	July 19, 2024		
Despicable Me 4	July 3, 2024	CGI-animated film.	
A Quiet Place: Day One	June 28, 2024		
Bad Boys: Ride or Die	June 7, 2024		
Furiosa: A Mad Max Saga	May 24, 2024		
Kingdom of the Planet of the Apes	May 10, 2024		
The Fall Guy	May 3, 2024		
Godzilla x Kong: The New Empire	March 29, 2024		
Ghostbusters: Frozen Empire	March 22, 2024		
Kung Fu Panda 4	March 8, 2024	CGI-animated film.	
Dune: Part Two	March 1, 2024		
Exhuma	February 22, 2024		
Madame Web	February 14, 2024		
Argylle	February 2, 2024		
The Beekeeper	January 12, 2024		

=== 2023 ===
Name	Release date	Notes	Ref.
Aquaman and the Lost Kingdom	December 22, 2023		
Migration	December 22, 2023	CGI-animated film.	
Wonka	December 8, 2023 (UK); December 15, 2023 (USA)		
NCT Nation: To the World in Cinemas	December 6, 2023		
Napoleon	November 22, 2023		
The Marvels	November 10, 2023		
Godzilla Minus One	November 3, 2023		
The Creator	September 29, 2023		
The Nun II	September 8, 2023		
Jawan	September 7, 2023		
Gran Turismo	August 25, 2023		
Meg 2: The Trench	August 4, 2023		
Mission: Impossible – Dead Reckoning Part One	July 12, 2023		
Indiana Jones and the Dial of Destiny	June 30, 2023		
The Flash	June 16, 2023		
Fast X	May 19, 2023		
Guardians of the Galaxy Vol. 3	May 5, 2023		
Coldplay – Music of the Spheres: Live at River Plate	April 19, 2023		
Im Hero: The Final	April 14, 2023		
Dungeons & Dragons: Honor Among Thieves	March 31, 2023		
Shazam! Fury of the Gods	March 17, 2023		
Ant-Man and the Wasp: Quantumania	February 17, 2023		
BTS: Yet to Come in Cinemas	February 1, 2023		

=== 2022 ===
Name	Release date	Notes	Ref.
Avatar: The Way of Water	December 16, 2022		
NCT Dream The Movie: In a Dream	November 30, 2022		
Fall	November 18, 2022	Selected territories.	
Black Panther: Wakanda Forever	November 11, 2022		
Bullet Train	August 5, 2022		
Emergency Declaration (film)	August 3, 2022		
Hansan: Rising Dragon	July 27, 2022 (South Korea)		
Thor: Love and Thunder	July 8, 2022		
Elvis	June 24, 2022		
Top Gun: Maverick	May 27, 2022		
Doctor Strange in the Multiverse of Madness	May 6, 2022		
Seventeen Power of Love: The Movie	April 20, 2022		
Fantastic Beasts: The Secrets of Dumbledore	April 15, 2022		
Morbius	April 1, 2022		
The Batman	March 4, 2022		
Uncharted	February 18, 2022		

=== 2021 ===
Name	Release date	Notes	Ref.
Spider-Man: No Way Home	December 17, 2021		
Ghostbusters: Afterlife	November 19, 2021		
No Time to Die	October 8, 2021		
Venom: Let There Be Carnage	October 1, 2021		
GUIMOON: The Lightless Door	August 25, 2021		
Blackpink: The Movie	August 4, 2021		
Escape from Mogadishu	July 28, 2021		
Black Widow	July 9, 2021		

=== 2020 ===
Name	Release date	Notes	Ref.
Wonder Woman 1984	December 25, 2020		
Mulan	September 4, 2020		
The New Mutants	August 28, 2020		
Peninsula	July 15, 2020		
Eyes on Me: The Movie	June 10, 2020	Selected territories.	
Onward	March 6, 2020 (Note: Due to movie theaters closures because of the COVID-19 pandemic, the film was released digitally in the United States and Canada through Premium VOD on the night of March 20, 2020 and became available for Disney+ subscribers on April 3, 2020 in the United States and Canada. This affected the number of projections and the box office performance of the ScreenX screenings. As the pandemic receded, the film was released back in regular theatres.)	First CGI-animated film to be presented in ScreenX.	
Birds of Prey	February 7, 2020		
Bad Boys for Life	January 17, 2020		

=== 2019 ===
Name	Release date	Notes	Ref.
Jumanji: The Next Level	December 13, 2019		
Ford v Ferrari	November 15, 2019		
Maleficent: Mistress of Evil	October 18, 2019		
Gemini Man	October 11, 2019		
It Chapter Two	September 6, 2019		
Shanghai Fortress	August 9, 2019		
Spider-Man: Far From Home	July 2, 2019		
Annabelle Comes Home	June 26, 2019		
Godzilla: King of the Monsters	May 31, 2019		
Pokémon: Detective Pikachu	May 10, 2019		
The Curse of La Llorona	April 19, 2019		
Shazam!	April 5, 2019		
Captain Marvel	March 8, 2019		
Alita: Battle Angel	February 14, 2019		
Love Yourself in Seoul	January 26, 2019		

=== 2018 ===
Name	Release date	Notes	Ref.
Aquaman	December 21, 2018		
Fantastic Beasts: The Crimes of Grindelwald	November 16, 2018		
Bohemian Rhapsody	November 2, 2018		
The Nun	September 7, 2018		
The Meg	August 10, 2018		
Ant-Man and the Wasp	July 6, 2018		
A or B	April 28, 2018		
Rampage	April 13, 2018		
Gonjiam: Haunted Asylum	March 28, 2018		
Detective Chinatown 2	February 16, 2018		
Black Panther	February 16, 2018		
Psychokinesis	January 31, 2018		
Sechskies Eighteen	January 18, 2018		

=== 2017 ===
Name	Release date	Notes	Ref.
The Thousand Faces of Dunjia	December 14, 2017		
Pororo: Dinosaur Island Adventure	December 7, 2017	CGI-animated film.	
Kingsman: The Golden Circle	September 22, 2017		
The Mimic	August 17, 2017		
The Battleship Island	July 26, 2017		
Wu Kong	July 13, 2017		
Pirates of the Caribbean: Dead Men Tell No Tales	May 26, 2017	First ScreenX film in the United States.	
King Arthur: Legend of the Sword	May 12, 2017		
The Great Wall	February 17, 2017		
The Village of No Return	January 26, 2017		

=== 2016 ===
Name	Release date	Notes	Ref.
A Chinese Odyssey: Part Three	September 14, 2016		
The Map Against the World	September 7, 2016		
Call of Heroes	August 12, 2016		
Operation Chromite	July 27, 2016		
Train to Busan	July 20, 2016		
For a Few Bullets	July 15, 2016		
Big Bang Made	June 30, 2016		
Bungaeman	February 7, 2016		

=== 2015 ===
Name	Release date	Notes	Ref.
Mojin: The Lost Legend	December 18, 2015		
The Himalayas	December 16, 2015		
The Priests	November 5, 2015		
Odysseo by Cavalia	October 22, 2015		
TVXQ! SPECIAL LIVE TOUR – T1ST0RY &...!	June 14, 2015		

=== 2013 ===
Name	Release date	Notes	Ref.
The X	December 20, 2013	Short film.	
Snowpiercer	August 1, 2013		

== See also ==
- ScreenX
- 4DX
- List of 4DX motion-enhanced films
- Cosm (company)
- Virtual reality
