= MX4D =

4D film format developed by MediaMation

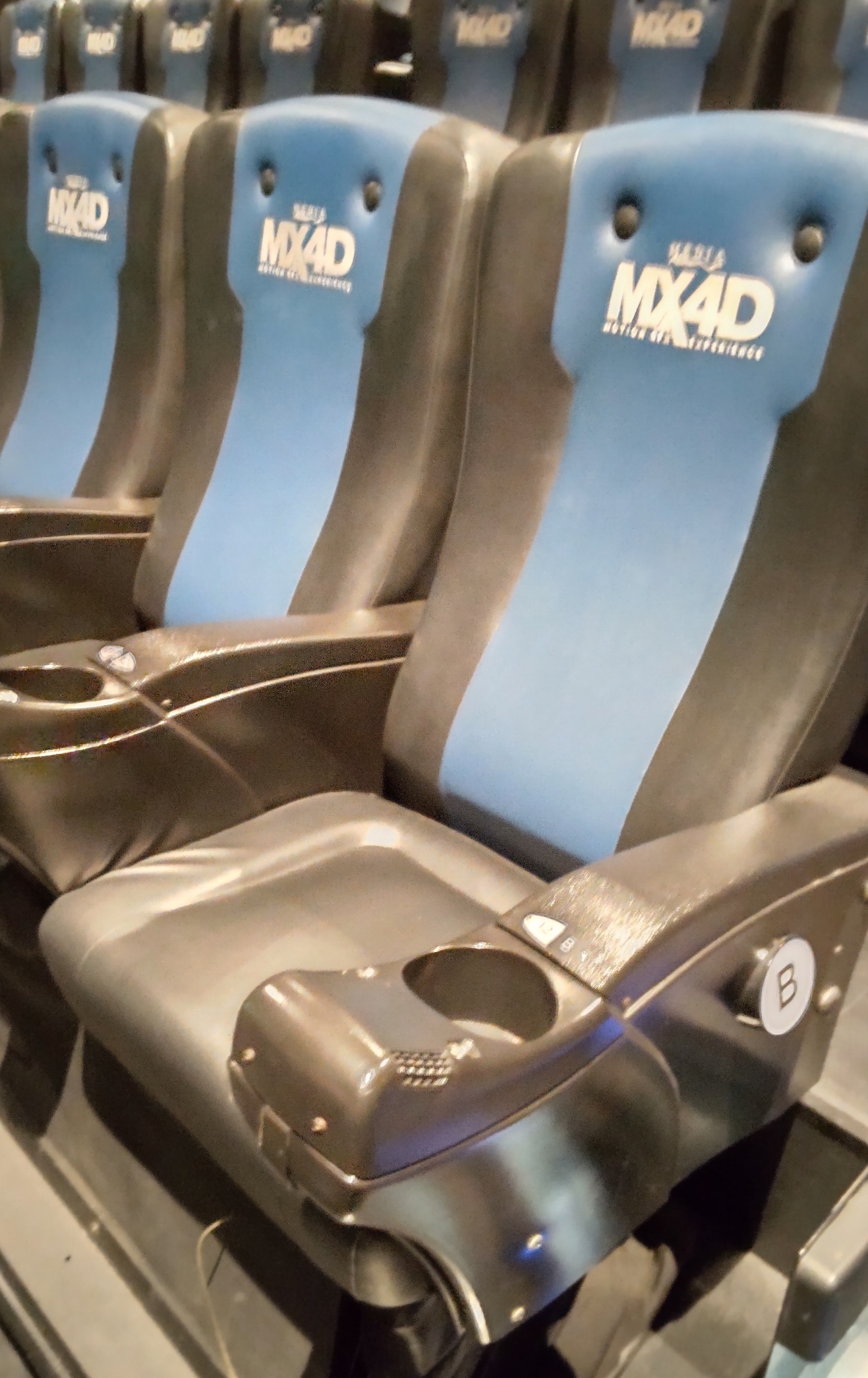
- Type: 4D film presentation system
- Inception: 2013
- Manufacturer: MediaMation
- Website: http://mx-4d.com/

MX4D is a 4D film presentation system developed by the American company MediaMation that allows a film to be augmented with environmental effects, such as motion, odors, and humidity. It uses theater seats which tilt forward, backward, and to the side in synchronization with onscreen motion, as well as air blasts, tactile effects, and other technology.

== History ==
The system was commercially introduced with the release of Hansel and Gretel: Witch Hunters in 2013, where Mexico's Cinemex opened its first MX4D room in Santa Fe, Mexico City.

On 6 May 2014, Cine Colombia opened its first MX4D theater, labeled as Dinamix 4D, in Barranquilla, Colombia at the Centro Comercial Buenavista mall, with the release of The Amazing Spider-Man 2.

On 26 March 2014, MediaMation entered an agreement with Santa Rosa Entertainment to install the first MX4D systems in the United States. One was first used for the release of Transformers: Age of Extinction at the Plaza Cinema 14 theater in Oxnard, California on 27 June 2014.

September 2018 Cineplexx Austria opened Austrias first MX4D system with 72 seats in the city of Graz. Diesel Cinemas followed one year later with an installation of 112 seats in the town of Gleisdorf.

In 2017, B&B Theatres has opened their first MX4D theaters in Kansas, and has since expanded locations.

In October 2019, B&B Theatres signed a deal with MediaMation to expand with 10 more locations.

== Functionality ==
All functions and effects of the system are driven by compressed air, which is stored in tanks at a pressure of 100-110psi/6.0-7.5bar. Each bench, consisting of 3 or 4 seats grouped together, is driven by 3 cylinders. Those cylinders are used for up/down, forward/backward and right/left movement. All the electronics and valves used for the effects are stored under each bench hidden by black leader, which also insures that no debris like popcorn gets onto the electronics.

Each seat has the following functions:

- 3 small cylinders (called "Pokers"), 1 in the backrest and 2 in the seating surface to simulate tactile feedback like punches.
- 2 nozzles, one in each armrest, for water and air blasts and 2 air nozzles in the backrest to tickle the users neck.
- 2 vents for wind, one in each armrest driven by small laptoplike fans.
- A pair of canisters for scents (candy, coffee, fresh cut grass, chocolate, whiskey, smoke, dirt or engine exhaust fumes). Each movie comes with its own required set of scents, which need to be changed before a movie premieres.
- A thin hose to tickle the users lower legs, for effects like running through grass.
- A buttkicker for low rumble like felt in a car ride.

There are other effects mounted throughout the auditorium:

- A set of nozzles mounted under the ceiling for rain.
- A pair of strobe lights for lightning or gunshots.
- Snow and bubble machines.
- Vents under the screen connected to fog machines.

The whole system can be controlled via a PC or tablet connected via W-LAN, to test or deactivate benches or certain effects. A test of all movements and effects is done by cinema employees before each day of screening to ensure all functions are working properly.

== See also ==
- 4D film
- RealD
- 4DX
- D-BOX
