= 4D film =

3D film with in-theater physical effects

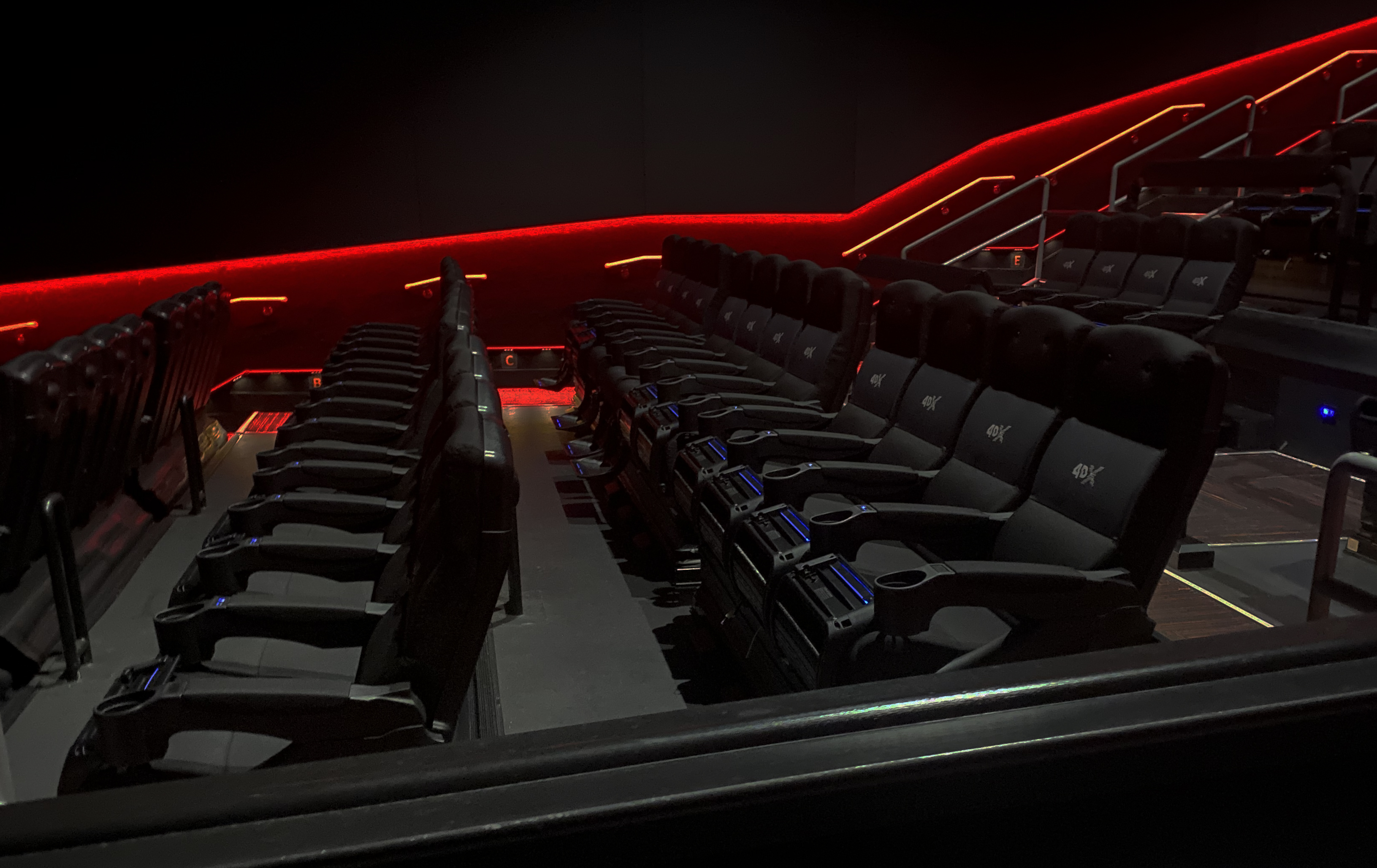
4D venue complete with motion-enhanced seating and multisensory olfactory technology. Pictured here is a 4DX theater.

A 4D film is a presentation system combining motion pictures with synchronized physical effects that occur in the theater. Effects simulated in 4D films include motion, vibration, scent, rain, mist, bubbles, fog, smoke, wind, temperature changes, and strobe lights. Seats in 4D venues vibrate and move.

As of 2022, 4D films have been exhibited in more than 65 countries. 4D motion pictures are also exhibited in theme parks.

== History ==
Although the term "4D film" is a marketing term to capitalize on the popularity of 3D film, it is not representative of four-dimensional space. Precursors of the modern 4D film presentation include Sensurround, which debuted in 1974 with the film Earthquake. Only a few films were presented in Sensurround, and Dolby Stereo replaced it in 1977, which featured extended bass frequencies and made subwoofers a common addition to cinema. Other notable efforts at pushing the boundaries of the film viewing experience include Fantasound, the first use of stereo sound; Cinemiracle and Cinerama, both widescreen formats utilizing multiple projectors; and Smell-O-Vision.

The Sensorium is regarded as the world's first commercial 4D film and was first screened in 1984 at Six Flags Power Plant in Baltimore. It was produced in partnership with Landmark Entertainment.

4DX, D-Box Technologies, and Mediamation all currently integrate 4D technology in global stadium seating multiplexes.

== List of 4D presentation systems for film theaters ==
The following is a list of 4D presentation systems developed for traditional film theaters with Stereoscopic 3D.

Overview of 4D providers
Format	Developer	Effects	Notes
4DX	CJ 4D Plex	motion, vibration, scent/olfactory, water sprays, wind/air, snow, fog, strobes, lightning, bubbles	Cineworld, Regal Cinemas, Event Cinemas
D-Box	D-Box Technologies	motion, vibration	Cinemark Theatres, Hoyts Cinemas
MX4D	MediaMation	motion, vibration, scent/olfactory, water sprays, wind/air, snow, fog, strobes, lightning, bubbles	Paramount Skydance, Showcase
4D E-Motion	Lumma	motion, vibration, scent/olfactory, water sprays, wind/air, snow, fog, strobes, lightning, bubbles	Harkins Theatres
(Not named by developer)	Red Rover	motion, water sprays, wind/air, scent/olfactory, fog, strobes, bubbles,	Branded as Super 4D in Lotte Cinema installations.

== Selected filmography ==
Title	Year	Release venue/Country	Notes
The Sensorium	1984	Six Flags Power Plant, Baltimore, MD	The very first 4D film.
Captain EO	1986	Epcot, Disneyland, Disneyland Paris and Tokyo Disneyland	Closed in the mid-late 1990s and reopened in 2010 as a tribute to the late Michael Jackson.
Muppet*Vision 3D	1991	Disney's Hollywood Studios	Directed by Jim Henson.
Honey, I Shrunk the Audience	1994	Epcot, Disneyland, Disneyland Paris and Tokyo Disneyland	Sponsored by Kodak, closed in all locations in May 2010, and was replaced with Captain EO.
Terminator 2 3D: Battle Across Time	1996	Universal Studios Japan	Directed by James Cameron
Pirates 4D	1997	SeaWorld Ohio, Busch Gardens Williamsburg, Thorpe Park in the UK, Busch Gardens Tampa Bay	Produced by Busch Entertainment, Directed by Keith Melton.
PandaDroom	2002	The Efteling, Netherlands	Same film released in other parks without 4D effects
SpongeBob SquarePants 4-D	2003	Six Flags over Texas, Moody Gardens, Shedd Aquarium, Adventure Dome, Six Flags Great Adventure, Movie Park Germany, Adventure Aquarium, Kings Dominion, (formerly at Paramount Parks), Indianapolis Zoo, Carowinds, Camden Aquarium (Camden, NJ), Flamingo Land Theme Park and Zoo and other locations	
Mickey's PhilharMagic	2003	Magic Kingdom, Hong Kong Disneyland, Tokyo Disneyland, and Disney California Adventure.	In collaboration with Walt Disney Animation Studios.
Haunted Lighthouse (Note: Also known as R. L. Stine's Haunted Lighthouse 4-D))	2003	Flamingo Land Theme Park and Zoo	
Shrek 4-D	2003	Universal Studios Florida, Universal Studios Hollywood, and Universal Studios Singapore	Released in an anaglyph version as Shrek 3-D on DVD
Borg Invasion	2004	Star Trek: The Experience, at Las Vegas Hilton, US	Closed in 2008, to be reopened in Neonopolis, Las Vegas
Fly Me to the Moon	2008	Six Flags over Texas	
Journey to the Center of the Earth 4-D Adventure	2008	Vibrant 5D, Raipur, India	Stone Mountain Park, Dollywood, Warner Bros. Movie World
Fly High: The Legend of Black Man	2017	India	First Indian 4D film; directed by Rahul Rathish Kumar
Avatar 4D	2009	South Korea, Hong Kong	In 4DX. James Cameron, Director
London Eye 4D Experience	2009	London Eye	Produced by Centre Screen Productions and Principal Large Format
Beyond All Boundaries	2009	WWII Museum, New Orleans	Produced by Tom Hanks
ENERGIA The Spirit of the Earth	2009	Cité de l'énergie, Shawinigan (Quebec)	Spectators are seated on a revolving platform. Features wind, snow, smoke, rain, vibration, and lighting effects.
"The Garden"	2010	USA pavilion at Expo 2010	The eight-minute film was projected upon five 10-meter-high screens.
Marvel Super Heroes 4D	2010	Madame Tussauds London, Trans Studio Bandung	
Rabid Rider	2010	Cincinnati Zoo	
Shalem	2011	Jerusalem Time Elevator, Jerusalem	A 3000-year-old guide to Jerusalem's history at the Jerusalem Time Elevator, Jerusalem.
The Bourne Legacy	2012	Multinational	In 4DX
Tallgrass Prairie: Tides of Time	2012	Flint Hills Discovery Center, Manhattan, Kansas	Features wind, snow, smoke, and lightning effects
Prometheus	2012	Cinepolis Galerias Guadalajara, Mexico	In 4DX. Ridley Scott, Director
Titanic	2012	Multinational	4DX re-release, James Cameron, Director
The Adventures of Tintin	2011	Nickelodeon Resorts, Paramount Parks, North Carolina Zoo, and Alton Towers	14-minute condensed version of the film.
Iron Man 3	2013	Korona World Theatre Nagoya, Japan, Seoul, South Korea	Labeled as 4DX featuring strobe lights, tilting seats, blowing wind, fog, and odor effects.
47 Ronin	2014	Multinational	In 4DX
Fury	2014	Multinational	In 4DX
Interstellar	2014	Multinational	In 4DX. Christopher Nolan, Director
Rio	2014	San Diego Zoo, Kentucky Kingdom, North Carolina Zoo, Indianapolis Zoo, Cincinnati Zoo	12-minute condensed version of the film.
Temple Run 7D	2014	India	9-minute ride to various Indian temples, including Kedarnath, Badrinath, Gangotri, Rameshwaram, and Dwarka, produced by Modern Techno Projects Private Ltd.
Happy Feet		Multinational	
Star Wars: The Force Awakens	2015	Multinational	In 4DX. J.J. Abrams, Director
Ice Age: No Time for Nuts 4D	2015	United States	4D-remastered version of the 2006 short film of the same name.
Rogue One	2016	Multinational	In 4DX
Batman v Superman: Dawn of Justice	2016	Seoul, Korea and New York City, New York	Labeled as 4DX including fog, wind, motion, rain, lightning, vibrations and scents.
Pixels	2016	Taguig, Philippines	4DX re-release including models, sprites, explosives, and bullets.
Mass Effect: New Earth 4D	2016	California's Great America	4 1/2-minute film, 60-foot screen with 4K HDR resolution, live performers, wind, water, leg pokers, neck ticklers, 80-channel surround sound.
LEGO Nexo Knights 4D: The Book of Creativity	2016	Legoland parks and Legoland Discovery Centre parks worldwide	12 1/2-minute 4D film of LEGO Nexo Knights shown at Legoland, along with The LEGO Movie 4D Produced by Alexander Lentjes for M2Film and Merlin Entertainments
Gravity	2018	Multinational	4DX re-release, Alfonso Cuarón, Director
Life of Pi	2018	Multinational	4DX re-release, Ang Lee, Director
1917	2019	Multinational	In 4DX, Sam Mendes, Director, Produced by Amblin Partners
Star Wars: The Rise of Skywalker	2019	Multinational	In 4DX. J.J. Abrams, Director
Gemini Man	2019	Multinational	In 4DX. Ang Lee, Director
The Lion King	2019	Multinational	In 4DX. Jon Favreau, Director
Inception	2020	Multinational	4DX re-release, Christopher Nolan, Director
The Matrix Resurrections	2021	Multinational	In 4DX. Lana Wachowski, Director
Top Gun: Maverick	2022	Multinational	In 4DX. Directed by Joseph Kosinski.
The Super Mario Bros. Movie	2023	Multinational	In 4DX. Aaron Horvath, Michael Jelenic Directors
Tom and Jerry	2022	Multinational	
Scoob!	2023	Multinational	
DC League of Super-Pets	2023	Multinational	
Scrooge: A Christmas Carol	2023	Multinational	
Oppenheimer	2023	Multinational	In 4DX. Christopher Nolan, Director
Postcard from Earth	2023	Sphere at the Venetian Resort, Las Vegas	Effects include wind, scents, and infrasound seat vibrations. Directed by Darren Aronofsky.
Godzilla Minus One	2023	Japan	In 4DX. Directed by Takashi Yamazaki
The Wizard of Oz at Sphere	2025	Sphere at the Venetian Resort, Las Vegas	Special effects include wind, scents, and infrasound seat vibrations. Directed by Victor Fleming. Immersive version of the 1939 film.

== See also ==
- 4DX
- Simulator ride
