= Blackpink: The Movie =

2021 South Korean documentary film

- Theatrical release poster
- Hangul: 블랙핑크: 더 무비
- RR: Beullaekpingkeu: deo mubi
- MR: Pŭllaekp'ingk'ŭ: tŏ mubi
- Directed by: Oh Yoon-dong; Jung Su-yee
- Production companies: YG Entertainment; CJ 4DPlex ScreenX Studio
- Distributed by: CJ 4DPlex ScreenX Studio (South Korea)
- Release date: August 4, 2021
- Running time: 99 minutes
- Country: South Korea
- Language: Korean
- Box office: $4.8 million

Blackpink: The Movie (Korean: 블랙핑크: 더 무비; stylized in all caps or as BLɅϽKPIИK THE MOVIE) is a 2021 South Korean documentary film directed by Oh Yoon-dong and Jung Su-yee, featuring South Korean girl group Blackpink. It was released on August 4, 2021, in South Korea and worldwide.

== Synopsis ==
The film features interviews with the four members of Blackpink — Jisoo, Jennie, Rosé and Lisa and live performances from The Show and In Your Area World Tour. It includes segments: "The Room of Memories," which highlights their last five years since debut, "Beauty" includes shots of each member and "Exclusive Interviews" features messages for their fans.

== Cast ==
- Kim Ji-soo
- Jennie Ruby Jane
- Roseanne Park
- Lalisa Manobal

== Production ==
South Korean girl group Blackpink debuted on August 8, 2016, with the single album Square One and went onto become one of the most successful K-pop acts. On June 16, 2021, YG Entertainment announced the release of Blackpink: The Movie as the part of their fifth debut anniversary project, dubbed "4 + 1 Project".

On June 23, the film was announced for the release on August 4, in South Korea. The tickets went on sale on June 30.

== Release ==
For its debut on August 4, the film was released in more than 100 countries and 3,000 theaters worldwide. The release was delayed to the end of August in countries in Southeast Asia such as Indonesia, Thailand and Malaysia due to COVID-19 pandemic regulations. The number of theaters worldwide will expand from 3,000 to 4,200 upon release in Southeast Asia.

== Reception ==
=== Box office ===
The film garnered almost 500,000 global viewers in five days. The countries with the greatest number of moviegoers were Mexico, the United States, Turkey, Brazil and Japan. Globally the film grossed over US$4.8 million in two weeks and became the highest-grossing event cinema release of 2021.

In South Korea, the film sold 5,420 tickets and grossed $62,483 from August 6 to 8 to place ninth at the weekend box office. Overall, from August 4 to 9 the film recorded 11,761 in total admissions and $134,412 in earnings.
