= 4DX =

4D film format developed by CJ CGV

- Logo used since 2019

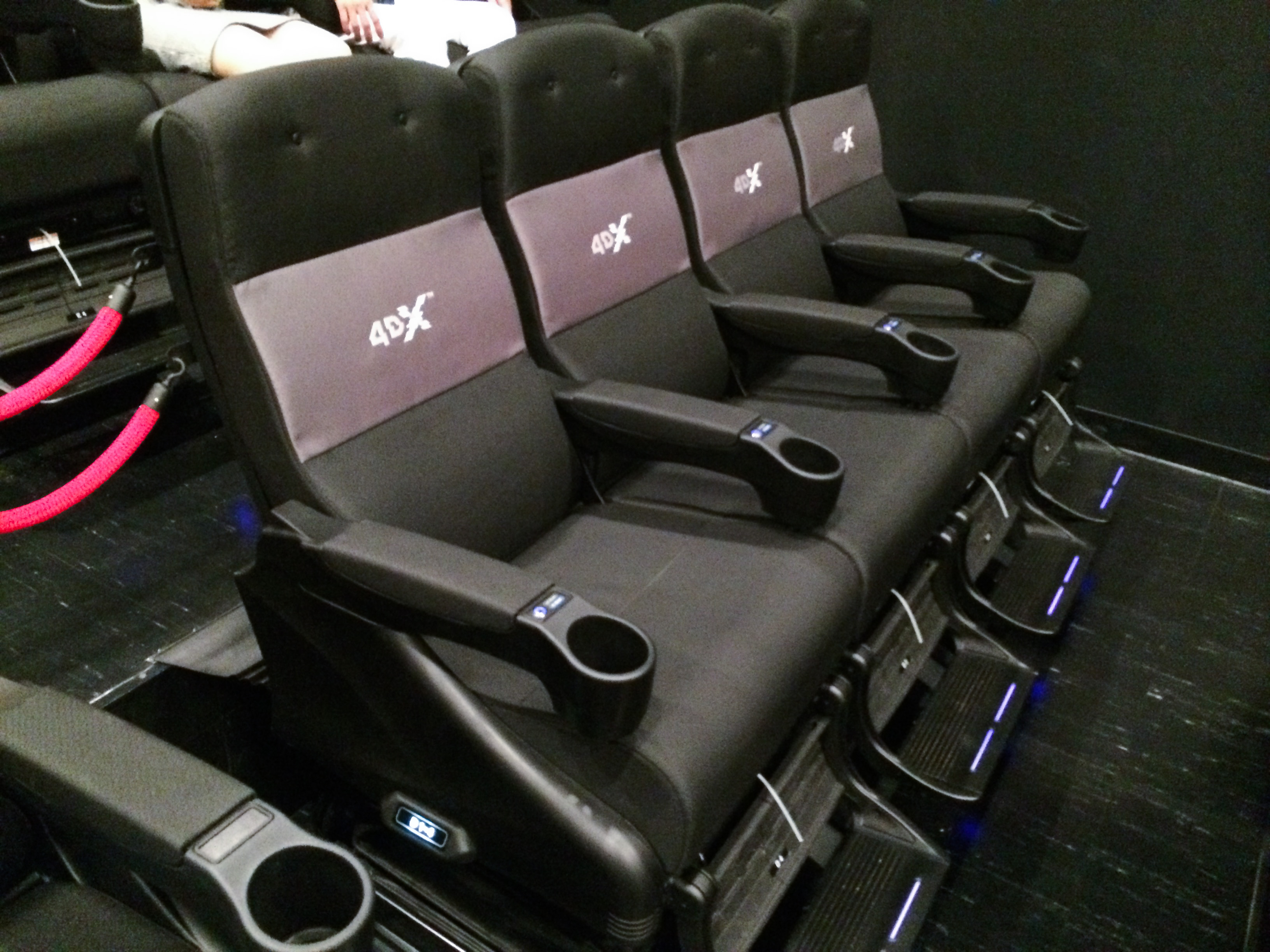
- 4DX seats at the Cinema Sunshine Heiwajima in Tokyo, Japan
- Type: 4D film presentation system
- Inception: 2009
- Manufacturer: CJ 4DPlex, subsidiary of CJ CGV
- Website: https://cj4dplex.com/4dx

4DX (Four-Dimensional eXperience) is a 4D film presentation system developed by CJ 4DPlex, a subsidiary of South Korean theater chain CJ CGV. It allows films to be augmented with various practical effects, including motion-seats, wind, strobelights, snow, water, and scents. First used in 2009, it presents films in both stereoscopic 3D and monoscopic 2D formats.

CJ has licensed the technology worldwide. As of September 2019, CJ 4DPlex operates 680 4DX theaters in 65 countries through collaborations with more than 80 theaters, including AMC Theatres, Regal Cinemas, Cineworld, Event Cinemas, Cinépolis, Wanda Cinemas, Cineplex Entertainment, Kinepolis, Village Cinemas, and Nu Metro. The company recorded an annual growth rate of more than 50 percent from 2013 to 2018.

== History ==
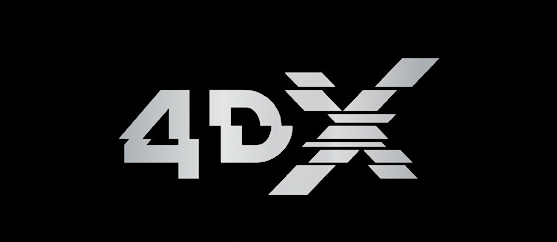
This logo was used until 2019.

4DX technology debuted at the CGV Sangam theater in Seoul in 2009. Following the success of Avatar, the technology expanded to more theaters in South Korea. In June 2011, Mexico-based Cinépolis invested $25 million and contracted with the CJ Group to bring the 4DX technology to its 11 locations in the country, with the first opening in a theater in Mexico City. It was the technology's debut in the Americas and outside the Asia region, and it expanded throughout Mexico. In 2019, the company announced the 4DX Screen theater, with an expanded multi-sided screen in 2020.

In Central America, 4DX is in countries like Guatemala through Cinepolis. In Costa Rica, it debuted at Cinépolis in 2014.

In 2012, South America received Cinépolis's first theater in São Paulo, Brazil. The 4DX theater in Colombia opened at the El Limonar Shopping Center in Cali in July 2013. Cine Hoyts (now part of Cinépolis) opened the first 4DX theater in Chile in 2013.

At CinemaCon in March 2014, CJ 4DPlex announced that it had collaborated with Anschutz Entertainment Group (AEG) and Regal Cinemas to debut the US's first 4DX auditorium at Regal Cinemas L.A. Live in Los Angeles, California. In 2018, CJ and Regal's new parent company Cineworld announced planned expansion of 4DX to at least 100 Regal locations. As of 2020, approximately 30 locations are in the United States, from various Regal locations, one Marcus Theatres location in Gurnee, two Cinépolis locations, and CGV's second U.S. site at The Source OC in Buena Park. In November 2023, B&B Theatres and CJ 4DPlex signed a deal to add their first 4DX location, in Texas. In March 2025, AMC Theatres and CJ 4DPlex signed a deal to expand 4DX to 40 AMC locations across the United States and Europe.

In Canada, Cineplex Entertainment debuted a 4DX auditorium at one of its Toronto locations on 4 November 2016. It opened a second location in Calgary in August 2019.

India has few 4DX screens. It was launched in Kerala at the Lulu International Shopping Mall in Kochi on 20 December 2021 with Spider-Man: No Way Home. Talking to the press after signing the agreement, Ajay Bijli, CMD at PVR says, "In a small time since the launch in Noida, 4DX format has outperformed by far all other formats."

In South Korea, since opening its first theater in partnership with Korona World Cinemas in April 2013, 4DX has increased. It operates them nationwide in partnership with large theater chains such as Aeon Cinemas and United Cinemas.

In 2012, 4DX's European debut was in Hungary. One year later, 4DX debuted in the Czech Republic. In 2017, CJ 4DPLEX collaborated with France's Pathé and Denmark's Nordisk Film Kino to open its first 4DX theater in Europe. It quickened its expansion in Europe with collaborations with Austrian theater operator Hollywood Megaplex in February 2017 and Cineworld in the United Kingdom and Republic Of Ireland.

CJ 4DPLEX started integrating 4DX within the Chinese market in partnership with its parent company, CJ CGV, in 2006. In 2013, it signed contracts with UME, a local theater operator in China. In 2014, CJ 4DPLEX made collaborations with Woosang More, WoMai, Beijing Jinbo, and Golden Harvest. In December 2014, CJ 4DPLEX formed a partnership with Wanda Cinema, a Chinese theater operator.

In 2015, 4DX debuted in Africa when CJ 4DPLEX and Nu Metro Cinemas entered a partnership to open 5 4DX theaters in South Africa. It opened the first 4DX auditorium in December with Star Wars: The Force Awakens at the V&A Waterfront theater.

At CinemaCon 2017, 4DX teamed up with Australian theater company Village Cinemas to open its first 4DX theater within one year. It opened at the Century City theater in Melbourne, Victoria on 27 October 2017 with the release of Thor: Ragnarok. It was the first time that the company entered Oceania and the Australian continent, and it made the technology available to six continents.

== Reception ==
=== Box office ===
In August 2019, 4DX reached 2.7 million moviegoers. The top three performing films for 4DX in August were Fast and Furious Presents: Hobbs & Shaw, The Lion King, and Aladdin. The local films The Bravest and One Piece: Stampede performed well in China and Japan.

As of 6 August 2019, the top five highest grossing 4DX films are:

1. Avengers: Endgame ($34.705 million)
2. Aladdin ($24.759 million)
3. Aquaman ($21.301 million)
4. The Lion King ($16.841 million)
5. Captain Marvel ($14.133 million)

In 2018, the company attracted a cumulative 24 million viewers a year, recording $290 million in box office revenue. In July 2019, the company attracted 3.07 million viewers and $38 million in ticket sales globally.

=== Awards ===
- 2014: 4DX won the I3DS (International 3-D and Advanced Imaging Society) "Cinema Innovation of the Year" award.
- 2015: 4DX won the Edison Awards, Silver Prize for Media and Visual Communication Entertainment Category.
- 2017: 4DX was one of "The Most Innovative Companies of 2017" for the Live Events Category by the magazine Fast Company.
- 2018: 4DX and ScreenX won the Edison Awards, Silver Prize for Media and Visual Communication Entertainment Category.
- 2018: 4DX won the "Innovation Technology of the Year Award" at Big Cine Expo.
- 2019: 4DX and ScreenX won the iResearch Award, Originative Cinema Technology Category.
- 2019: 4DX was one of "The Most Innovative Companies of 2019" for the Live Events Category by Fast Company.

== Variations ==
4DX has expanded to virtual-reality, also known as 4DX VR, which utilizes a set of specific 4DX model seats consisting of VR headsets, similar to that of virtual reality amusement rides, and is described to be the "world's first VR theater". First showcased at the AAE 2017 and later IAAPA Attractions Expo 2017, it plays exclusive virtual reality-produced films, short films, as well as games and movie trailers. There are at least six versions of the 4DX VR technology brand: Disk for horizontal rotation, Ride which consists of four-to-eight seats on a 6-axis motion-platform, Racing for presentations focused on the racing genre, Sway and Twist in which seats enable twist and side movements, motion-chair which is a singular 4DX chair consisting of the VR headsets, and Sports for sports-focused presentations with specific bike, snowboard, and kayak designs.

The Ultra 4DX technology (formerly 4DX with ScreenX and 4DX Screen) combines the multi-screen projection, known as ScreenX, and the motion-seats in a theater. It was first introduced in 2018 and made its debut in CinemaCon 2018. Both technologies are owned by CJ 4DPLEX.

== Special effects ==
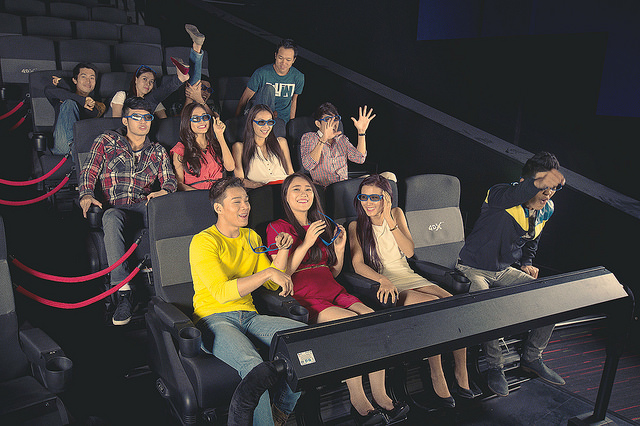
4DX theater in Vietnam

The special effects are:

- Seats: moving over three axes, sway (left–right movement), leg tickler, vibration
- Near-seat effects: airflow and water spray directed at the moviegoer's face, water, rain, scents, and hot air
- Room effects: bubbles, fog, wind, strobes, snow, rainstorm

== See also ==
- List of 4DX motion-enhanced films
- MX4D
- IMAX
- 4D film
- ScreenX
- CJ CGV
