= Road House (franchise) =

- Official franchise logo
- Based on: Road House by David Lee Henry
- Starring: Patrick Swayze; Johnathon Schaech; Jake Gyllenhaal; Various actors (See below)
- Distributed by: United Artists (1); Sony Pictures Home Entertainment (2); Amazon MGM Studios (3)
- Country: United States
- Language: English
- Budget: $100 million (2 films)

The Road House franchise includes American action installments, including theatrical, straight-to-home video, musical stage, and streaming releases. Based on an original story written by David Lee Henry, the plot centers around main characters hired to enforce security at small-town bars, that despite being troubled by their own pasts must heroically devise protective measures for the community against the machinations of criminal syndicate organizations. Through the course of their actions the lead characters work to overthrow the crime, and create a better community for its citizens.

The franchise as a whole has received mixed response from critics, though it has been a success amongst its audience. Years after its original release, the original movie ultimately earned its status as a 1980s action-cult classic, despite its initial mild critical reaction and meager box office performance. Its sequel which released through home video media received a negative reception from critics who noted its inferiority to its predecessor, while its monetary totals were not publicly made known.

The 2024 streaming exclusive film was met with a mix of approval, and disparaging remarks from critics. The 2024 film resulted in controversy directed at the studio's development of the project; though some of its reviews declare the remake as a superior improvement, while others preferred the original. Praise was given to its director, cast, action sequences, and reveration of its source material; while criticism was directed at its script and its use of CGI special effects. Analysts estimated that if the project debuted through movie theaters it could have earned a $50 million debut, while Amazon has named it as its most in-house viewed movie release of all-time.

== Films ==
Film	U.S. release date	Director	Screenwriter(s)	Story by	Producer(s)
Road House	May 19, 1989	Rowdy Herrington	Hilary Henkin & David Lee Henry	David Lee Henry	Joel Silver
Road House 2	July 18, 2006	Scott Ziehl	Miles Chapman, Richard Chizmar & Johnathon Schaech	Miles Chapman	Yoram Pelman
Road House	March 21, 2024	Doug Liman	Charles Mondry & Anthony Bagarozzi	Charles Mondry, David Lee Henry & Anthony Bagarozzi	Joel Silver
Road House 2	TBA	Ilya Naishuller	Will Beall	Will Beall	Alex Gartner, Charles Roven, Jake Gyllenhaal & Josh McLaughlin
Road House: Dylan	TBA	Doug Liman	R. Lance Hill	R. Lance Hill	Doug Liman

=== Road House (1989) ===
James Dalton, a mild-mannered and effective bouncer in New York, is regularly troubled by memories of a time where his actions of self-defense resulted in the death of his attacker. Despite his self-doubt, a businessman hires Dalton for a security job at a club called Double Deuce in Jasper, Missouri, which is known notoriously for its ill-natured clientele. In his new position, Dalton is determined to use his professional skills to help clean up the bar and provide a better environment for its recurring customers. In the process of completing his job, he finds himself in opposition with a wealthy crime lord named Brad Wesley whose business practices directly influence the corruption in town. Wesley orchestrates repeated strategic assaults on the community with intentions to close what he perceives as a rival club, and to have Dalton removed by any means necessary.

After beginning romantic relationship with Dr. Elizabeth Clay, the niece of Red Webster, the owner of the local auto parts store that was burned down by Brad Wesley's henchmen, Dalton finds himself at a greater conflict with the crime as Wesley had intentions to court Elizabeth. When an aggressive assassin named Jimmy Reno is sent to end his life, Dalton once again uses his fight training in self defense and kills the assailant. Dalton continues his pursuits and determines that in order to end all corruption in the surrounding area, he must defeat the criminal organization with some help of friends new and old, but is ultimately faced with the difficult decision of whether he allows Wesley to survive.

=== Road House 2 (2006) ===
Shane Tanner is known to those around him as the son of the successful and legendary, yet deceased security specialist James Dalton. Once a state trooper, Tanner advanced through his career and now works as a D.E.A. agent in New York. Through his time with the DEA, Tanner has found success of his own while trying to honor his father's reputation. After learning that his uncle Nate Tanner was ambushed by criminals and is hospital-bound, Shane travels to Louisiana to help care for him. Upon arrival he learns that the attempted murder was a result of his uncle's refusal to sell his local bar the Black Pelican, to resident drug and crime organizations. Shane determines to investigate while also running the company in addition to caring for his uncle, during Uncle Nate's recovery. As he becomes romantically involved with a regular customer, a schoolteacher named Beau Hampton, Shane learns that the disgruntled former security specialist for the bar named William "Wild Bill" Decarie is linked to violent battery of his uncle.

As he continues his investigation, Shane discovers that Wild Bill's boss is the Miami crime lord Victor Cross, and finds connections to the murder of his father James Dalton years before. Though they are impossibly outnumbered, Shane resolves to end all crime in the surrounding area with the help of his new friends and allies by permanently removing Victor, Bill, their men and their organizations from the state.

=== Road House (2024) ===
Former-UFC fighter Elwood Dalton, is troubled by the tormented memories of accidentally killing his friend during a fighting match. As he finds himself enwrapped in underground fighting scams and plans to take his own life, Dalton is presented with the opportunity to redeem himself and is hired by Frankie, the owner of a saloon called The Road House to serve as head of security. When Dalton begins to train the bar's staff in self-defense, a wealthy resident criminal named Ben Brandt sends groups of his thugs to remove Dalton from the town, but is repeatedly thwarted by his expertise in various fighting styles. Dalton begins a romantic relationship with Ellie, a medical official and daughter of the corrupted town Sheriff named Big Dick, who sees goodness in Dalton despite his troubled past.

Frankie explains to Dalton that Brandt and his incarcerated father, plan to build a large resort and have attempted various tactics to coerce her into selling her property as part of the expansion. Following continued failures, the Brandt family crime syndicate resorts to hiring an aggressive and unpredictable assassin named Knox to finish their competition. Just as he had resolved to leave the town and its corruption behind, Knox abducts Ellie and holds her hostage. Now more determined than ever, Dalton races against time to defeat unlawful wrongdoers.

=== Road House 2 (TBA) ===
In March 2024, Gyllenhaal expressed interest in reprising his starring role and developing a sequel to the 2024 movie. By May of the same year, a sequel was officially announced to be in development with Gyllenhaal reprising the lead role. The CEO of Amazon MGM named Jennifer Salke stated that work on the project is ongoing. In June, Gyllenhaal stated that the sequel will expand the franchise.

By April 2025, Guy Ritchie joined the production as director. In addition to reprising the starring role, Gyllenhaal will serve as producer alongside Josh McLaughlin, Charles Roven, and Alex Gartner. The project will be a joint-venture production between Amazon MGM Studios, Nine Stories Productions, and Altas Entertainment. By July 2025, Ritchie stepped down from his role, while Ilya Naishuller was hired to replace him as director, from a script written by Will Beall. Principal photography was scheduled to commence in the fall of the same year.

=== Future ===
In October 2025, it was announced that Doug Liman had purchased the rights to a separate installment in the Road House franchise. Written by franchise creator R. Lance Hill, the project is intended to serve as a legacy sequel to the original film. Production is intended to commence, on the basis that Hill wins his lawsuit in accordance with Section 203 of the U.S. Copyright Act.

== Main cast and characters ==
List indicators

This section includes characters who will appear or have appeared in the franchise in main roles.

- An empty grey cell indicates the character was not in the film, or that the character's official presence has not yet been confirmed.
- ^{C} indicates a cameo role.
- ^{V} indicates a voice-only role.

Character	Films		
Character	Road House (1989)	Road House 2 (2006)	Road House (2024)
Principal cast
James Dalton	Patrick Swayze	Referenced	
Shane Tanner		Johnathon Schaech	
Elwood Dalton			Jake Gyllenhaal
Dr. Elizabeth "Doc" Clay	Kelly Lynch		
Wade Garrett	Sam Elliott		
Brad Welsey	Ben Gazzara		
Jimmy Reno	Marshall Teague		
Beau Hampton		Ellen Hollman	
Nate Tanner		Will Patton	
Victor Cross		Richard Norton	
William "Wild Bill" Decarie		Jake Busey	
Ellie			Daniela Melchior
Ben Brandt			Billy Magnussen
Knox			Conor McGregor
Supporting cast
Frank Tilghman	Kevin Tighe		
Red Webster	Red West		
Pat McGurn	John Doe		
Dep. Garland Hendricks		Louis Herthum	
Luther Keyes		Lawrence Varnado	
Chubby D'Costa		Corey Hart	
Sands Cooper		William Ragsdale	
Jim Monyihan		Grover Coulson	
S.O. Mr. "Big" Dick			Joaquim de Almeida
Carter			Austin Post

== Additional production and crew details ==
Film	Crew/Detail					
Film	Composer	Cinematographer	Editor(s)	Production companies	Distributing companies	Running time
Road House (1989)	Michael Kamen	Dean Cundey	John F. Link & Frank J. Urioste	Metro-Goldwyn-Mayer, United Artists, Silver Pictures	Metro-Goldwyn-Mayer/United Artists	1 hr 54 mins
Road House 2	Amotz Plessner	Thomas L. Callaway	Edgar Burcksen	Metro-Goldwyn-Mayer, Sony Pictures Home Entertainment, Manyana Films	Sony Pictures Home Entertainment	1 hr 26 mins
Road House (2024)	Christophe Beck	Henry Braham	Doc Crotzer	Metro-Goldwyn-Mayer, Silver Pictures	Amazon MGM Studios, Amazon Prime Video Films	2 hrs 1 min

== Reception ==
=== Box office and financial performance ===
Film	Box office gross			Box office ranking		Total home video sales	Budget	Worldwide net total income	Ref.
Film	North America	Other territories	Worldwide	All-time North America	All-time worldwide	Total home video sales	Budget	Worldwide net total income	Ref.
Road House (1989)	$30,050,028	—N/a	$30,050,028	#2,979	#4,311	Information not publicly available	$10,000,000	$20,050,028	
Road House 2	—N/a	—N/a	—N/a	—N/a	—N/a	Information not publicly available	Information not publicly available	Information not publicly available	
Road House (2024)	—N/a	—N/a	—N/a	—N/a	—N/a	Information not publicly available	$85,000,000	Information not publicly available	

=== Critical and public response ===
Film	Rotten Tomatoes	Metacritic	CinemaScore
Road House (1989)	44% (50 reviews)	36/100 (16 reviews)	—N/a
Road House 2	TBD (4 reviews)	—N/a	—N/a
Road House (2024)	60% (208 reviews)	57/100 (46 reviews)	—N/a

== Stage ==
Written/directed by Timothy Haskell as an Off-Broadway play adaptation of the original movie, starring Taimak Guarriello in the lead role as James Dalton. The show debuted on October 30, 2003 in the circuit known as the Lower East Side. Positive reviews resulted in the production earning a residency at the La Tea from December 14, 2003 through February 8, 2004 playing at the Barrow Street Theatre; while an additionally performance was created for later dates in February at the same location. Haskell adapted the stageplay directly from the script of the 1989 film, with the creator stating: "...this is not a musical, we're calling it a 'brawlsical'... Trust me, I know what kind of film this is. I want to get to the bottom of why so many seemingly smart people can quote lines from this film." Early reviews categorized the satire stage adaptation as a "fightsical". Comedically, the official full title of the production was Road House: The Stage Version of the Cinema Classic that Starred Patrick Swayze, Except this One Stars Taimak from the 80's Cult Classic 'The Last Dragon' Wearing a Blonde Mullet Wig.

The production was noted for its action sequences and explosions being created through miniature sets, with a videographer projecting the film in real-time for the audience on a screen, while foley performers provided sound effects live alongside the stage actors. Guarriello additionally served as fight choreographer, while Rebeca Ramirez developed additional choreography. Haskell, Tanya Bershadsky, Michael Voyer, and Andrea Ciannavei were producers for the adaptation.
