= Roadhouse =

Roadhouse may refer to:

== Premises ==
- Roadhouse (premises), a mixed-use premise to service passing travellers
- Receiving house or roadhouse, a theatre for touring theatre companies
- A truck stop in rural Australia

== Arts and entertainment ==
=== Film ===
- Road House (1928 film), an American silent drama
- Road House (1934 film), a British comedy crime film
- Road House (1948 film), an American film noir
- Road House, an American action franchise
  - Road House (1989 film), an American action film
  - Road House 2 (2006 film), a sequel to the 1989 film
  - Road House (2024 film), a remake of the 1989 film
  - Road House 2 (upcoming film), an upcoming sequel to the 2024 film

=== Music ===
- Roadhouse (band), a British rock band
- Roadhouse (Ruth Cameron album), 1999
- Roadhouse, a 1988 album by John Cafferty and the Beaver Brown Band
- "Road House", a song by the Flamin' Groovies' on the 1970 album Flamingo

=== Other arts ===
- Road House (play), a 1932 British play by Walter C. Hackett
- The Roadhouse, a former American radio station

== See also ==
- "Roadhouse Blues", a 1970 song by The Doors
- Logan's Roadhouse, an American restaurant chain
- Roadhouse Grill, an American restaurant chain
- Texas Roadhouse, an American restaurant chain
