= Doug Liman's unrealized projects =

During his long career, American filmmaker Doug Liman has worked on several projects which never progressed beyond the pre-production stage under his direction. Some of these projects fell in development hell, were officially canceled, were in development limbo or would see life under a different production team.

== 1990s ==
=== The Breakers ===
In 1997, following the release of his second film Swingers, Liman was attached to direct United Artists' The Breakers starring Alicia Silverstone and Angelica Huston in the cast, but he opted to helm Go in its place instead. This project eventually became Heartbreakers, which was made in 2001 but without the involvement of Liman, Silverstone or Huston.

=== Bachelor No. 2 ===
Also in 1997, it was reported in Variety that Liman was additionally attached to Working Title's Bachelor No. 2, which follows "a guy who wins a dream date with a gorgeous woman who turns out to be a nightmare."

=== Three Days Out ===
In the late 1990s, Liman became attached to direct an action film script by author John Freeman Gill at Propaganda Films called Three Days Out, which follows former astronauts who steal NASA equipment in order to "take a bit of an unauthorized jaunt into space."

=== Sonny Bright ===
In November 1999, Liman was set to direct the spec script by Wayne Rice and Gina Goldman entitled Sonny Bright, with the Farrelly brothers attached as producers.

== 2000s ==
=== Untitled Martha's Vineyard film ===
On June 17, 2002, it was reported that following the release of The Bourne Identity, Liman was in the process of completing a new screenplay that involved military action set in Martha's Vineyard.

=== SDNY TV series ===
Also on June 17, 2002, it was reported that Liman was working on SDNY, a television series based on his brother Lewis' legal career; specifically Lewis' connection to ImClone Systems founder and former CEO Samuel D. Waksal, for ABC.

=== Untitled HBO pilot ===
Also on June 17, 2002, it was reported that Liman was working on a television pilot for HBO.

=== Southcom TV pilot ===
On December 15, 2002, it was reported that an hourlong NBC drama Southcom about soldiers stationed in Puerto Rico was being developed by Liman's company Hypnotic, with Matthew Carnahan hired to write and executive alongside. Liman was to direct if the script was greenlit as a pilot.

=== CHiPs series reboot ===
Also on December 15, 2002,

=== Untitled action drama film ===
On June 30, 2004, it was announced that Warner Bros. Pictures had acquired a pitch for an untitled action drama centered on the California Highway Patrol, to be directed by Liman and scripted by Sheldon Turner; Liman would also produce the film alongside Dave Bartis and Jonathan Shestack.

=== 22 Birthdays TV pilot ===
On August 14, 2005,

=== Knight Rider series reboot ===
On September 26, 2007, it was reported that Liman was "open to directing" the two-hour backdoor pilot for the Knight Rider series reboot, though he would ultimately only serve as executive producer on the project.

=== Luna Park ===
On November 27, 2007, Liman was set to direct an untitled science fiction film for DreamWorks Pictures about a lunar expedition, with Jake Gyllenhaal set to star. On June 6, 2011, it was announced that the film, now titled Luna, would be co-financed by New Regency and Skydance Media for Paramount Pictures, with Simon Kinberg joining the project as a writer and producer. On September 9, 2015, Tom Cruise signed on to star in the film, which was now titled Luna Park.

== 2010s ==
=== Attica ===
On February 16, 2010, Liman was set to direct Geoffrey S. Fletcher's screenplay Attica with Liman producing the movie with Dave Bartis, Elloit Abbott, & Avram Ludwig.

=== Gambit remake ===
On April 28, 2010, Liman was in talks to direct the American remake of Gambit for Summit Entertainment with the Coen brothers writing the screenplay, which Michael Hoffman ended up directing.

=== The Three Musketeers ===
On May 7, 2010, Liman was set to direct a film adaptation of Alexandre Dumas's novel The Three Musketeers with Peter Straughan and Bridget O'Connor writing the screenplay and Lionel Wigram producing for Warner Bros. Pictures, but it was canceled that August, due to Paul W. S. Anderson's competing 2011 adaptation; Liman would ultimately direct the All You Need is Kill adaptation, Edge of Tomorrow, instead.

=== The Last of the Tribe ===
On July 13, 2010, Liman was set to direct Monte Reel's non-fiction novel The Last of the Tribe: The Epic Quest to Save a Lone Man in the Amazon with Liman producing with Dave Bartis, Ed Saxon, Steve Schwartz, and Paula Mae Schwartz. On January 30, 2026, it was announced that Claudio Borrelli would ultimately direct the project, instead of Liman.

=== The Osterman Weekend ===
On September 3, 2010, Liman was set to produce a film adaptation of Robert Ludlum's novel The Osterman Weekend with Jesse Wigutow writing the screenplay and Peter Davis, Simon Kinberg, Jeffrey Weiner, and Henry Morrison producing for Summit Entertainment, On February 28, 2012, it was announced that Brian Kirk had entered talks to direct the project, but on May 18, 2016, the adaptation was likely incorporated into a planned shared universe of Ludlum adaptations for Universal Pictures, Dwayne Johnson's Seven Bucks Productions & James Vanderbilt's Mythology Entertainment without Liman.

=== Untitled Two-Gun Cohen biopic ===
On March 21, 2011, Liman told The Hollywood Reporter that he would direct a 1920s biographical drama about Morris Abraham "Two-Gun" Cohen, the British bodyguard to Sun Yat-sen, teaming with producers Rob Reiner and Alan Greisman in collaboration with Beijing-based company Galloping Horse. Liman was to work from a script by newcomer Matt Brown.

=== Everest ===
On November 30, 2011, it was announced that Liman would direct Everest, based on the Jeffrey Archer novel Paths of Glory about mountaineer George Mallory's attempts to scale Mount Everest in the 1920s, for Sony Pictures, with Sheldon Turner adapting the novel. On September 24, 2012, it was announced that Tom Hardy had entered talks to star as Mallory. In October 2013, it was announced that the project was preparing to begin production in March 2014, but that Hardy had dropped out due to scheduling conflicts. On June 16, 2021, it was announced that Ewan McGregor had been cast as Mallory, alongside Mark Strong as Arthur Hinks and Sam Heughan as George Finch. Production was expected to begin in January 2022, with HanWay Films now handling the project's international sales and cinematographer Martin Ruhe, production designer Oliver Scholl, and composer T Bone Burnett all attached to the project.

=== Time and Again ===
On July 25, 2012, it was announced that Lionsgate studios optioned the film rights to Jack Finney's time-travel novel Time and Again, with Liman set to direct and produce.

=== The Tourist ===
On September 7, 2012, Liman was set to direct and produce the film adaptation of Olen Steinhauer's novel The Tourist for Sony Pictures.

=== Narco Sub ===
On October 8, 2013, Liman was in negotiations to direct the action thriller Narco Sub, with David Guggenheim writing the screenplay and Genre Films and Scott Free Productions producing for 20th Century Fox. On May 28, 2014, Antoine Fuqua was set to direct Narco Sub instead of Liman.

=== Heartbeats TV series ===
On November 5, 2013, Liman was set to produce Ben York Jones and Michael Mohan's romantic dramedy series Heartbeats, with Liman's business partner Dave Bartis will serve as executive producers and Jones and Mohan will co-executive produce the series for Starz.

=== El Presidente ===
On November 19, 2013, Liman was set to take over directing the comedy El Presidente from Jay Roach, with Tom Cruise starring, Paul Attanasio writing the script, and Warner Bros. set to distribute.

=== Railhead ===
On October 20, 2015, Liman was set to direct the feature film adaptation of Philip Reeve's novel Railhead with Gary Graham writing the screenplay, Liman producing the movie with Dave Bartis, Denise DiNovi, and Allison Greenspan for Warner Bros. distributing.

=== The Year of the Great Storm ===
On March 9, 2016, Liman was set to produce Karzan Kader's biographical crime film The Year of the Great Storm, with Johanna Baldwin writing the screenplay and producing along with Tyler Perry, George C. Wolfe, Ozzie Areu, Matt Moore, and Russ Stratton.

=== Dark Universe ===
On August 24, 2016, Liman was set to direct a Justice League Dark film entitled Dark Universe set in the DC Extended Universe, with Michael Gilio set to write the screenplay and Scott Rudin producing. On May 23, 2017, Liman left the project.

=== Unearthed ===
On June 7, 2017, Liman was set to direct the feature film adaptation of Amie Kaufman and Meagan Spooner's novel Unearthed for Columbia Pictures and Cross Creek Pictures, with Jez Butterworth and John-Henry Butterworth set to write the screenplay.

=== The Cannonball Run reboot ===
On June 4, 2018, Liman was in talks to direct the reboot of The Cannonball Run for Warner Bros. with Thomas Lennon and Robert Ben Garant in talks to write the screenplay.

=== This Perfect Day ===
On June 13, 2018,

=== Crazy Talented TV series ===
On July 12, 2019, Liman was set to produce and direct Crazy Talented based on a short story by Steven Gould with Michael Karnow writing the Quibi series.

== 2020s ==
=== Untitled ISS film ===
In 2020, Liman was set to direct and write a film to be filmed on the International Space Station, with Tom Cruise set to star and produce the project with Liman in collaboration with NASA and SpaceX, and on October 11, 2022, Cruise was confirmed to be the first civilian to do a spacewalk for the movie.

=== Red Notice TV series ===
In March 2022, Liman signed on to direct and executive produce a television series adaptation of the 2015 book Red Notice: A True Story of High Finance, Murder, and One Man's Fight for Justice by activist and financier Bill Browder.

=== Rise and Kill First ===
In May 2022, Liman was set to direct the Otto Skorzeny biopic based on Ronen Bergman‘s nonfiction book Rise and Kill First with Story Syndicate and Abot Hameiri producing the movie.

=== The Saint series reboot ===
In 2023, it was announced that Liman would direct a reboot of The Saint for Paramount Pictures, with Regé-Jean Page starring.

=== Deeper ===
In 2024, Liman confirmed he was in early development of the supernatural thriller Deeper for Warner Bros. Pictures, with Tom Cruise and Ana de Armas attached to star. By July 2025, Puck News reported that development was paused due to concerns of its $275 million budget. In August, The Hollywood Reporter stated that the film was put on hold due to specific weather window needs.

=== The Stand ===
In June 2025, a new film adaptation of Stephen King's epic novel The Stand was reported to be in development at Paramount Pictures with Liman attached to direct and co-produce along with Tyler Thompson of Cross Creek Pictures.

=== The Initiative ===
In August 2025, it was announced Liman would direct the spy thriller The Initiative for Universal Pictures, reuniting with Mr. & Mrs. Smith star Angelina Jolie.

=== Road House: Dylan ===
In October 2025, it was announced that Liman had purchased the rights to make Road House: Dylan, a legacy sequel to the 1989 film Road House. Liman had previously directed an Amazon Studios remake of the original film, which was released straight-to-streaming the year before. This new project, scripted by one of the original film's two screenwriters, R. Lance Hill, was set to begin production pending the outcome of Hill's lawsuit concerning Section 203 of the U.S. Copyright Act. Although Road House: Dylan was considered a new installment in the franchise, its continuity is unrelated to the remake's sequel, Road House 2.

=== Star One ===
In 2026, Variety reported that Miles Teller and Eddie Redmayne were in talks to star as two "mismatched CIA agents" in the Liman-directed spy thriller Star One, to be pitched to buyers at that year's Cannes Film Festival.
