= Julie Michaels =

American actress

- Born: July 20, 1970 (age 56)
- Occupation: Actress
- Years active: 1989–present
- Spouse: Peewee Piemonte (m. 1993)

Julie Michaels is an American actress and stuntwoman. Her first film role was Denise in Road House (1989). She also appeared in Doctor Mordrid (1992), Jason Goes to Hell: The Final Friday (1993), and Chick Fight (2020).

Michaels is from an Italian family. She married stunt coordinator Peewee Piemonte.

In May 2000 Michaels sued Morgan Gindal, producer of the television program V.I.P., and Lafitte Productions Inc., the company that produced the show, after she lost her job as stunt double for Pamela Anderson, the star of the series. The suit filed in Los Angeles Superior Court said that Michaels adapted to the job by changing the color and style of her hair, having tattoos painted on, and having breast augmentation surgery in order to more nearly resemble Anderson. An injury while she worked on the show in 1998 prevented her from performing in the season's last five episodes. When the next season began in 1999, Michaels said that she was told that another double had been hired. She sought unspecified damages.

== Filmography ==
=== Films ===
Year	Title	Role	Notes
1989	Road House	Denise	
1991	Point Break	Freight Train	
1992	Doctor Mordrid	Irene	
1993	Witchboard 2: The Devil's Doorway	Susan	
1993	Jason Goes to Hell: The Final Friday	Elizabeth Marcus	
1997	Batman & Robin	Jane	(uncredited)
1997	A Time to Revenge	Tami Whitmar	
2001	Rat Race	Charleen	(uncredited)
2001	Layover	Female Club Goer	
2001	Rock Star	Groupie	(uncredited)
2002	The Scorpion King	Harem Girl	(uncredited)
2002	The Secret Sea	Mermaid mother	(Short film)
2003	Song of the Vampire	Maggie	(Video)
2007	Rush Hour 3	French Patron	(uncredited)
2009	Wake Up and Write	Mom	(Short film)
2012	The Legends of Nethiah	Naran Anie	
2013	A Fabulous Tale	Grace Ann/Betty Lynn	(Short film)
2014	Last Writes	Julie Marit	(Short film)
2018	The Biggest Elephant	Jan	(Short film)
2020	Chick Fight	Mary	

=== Television ===
Year	Title	Role	Notes
1990	1st & Ten	Susie Q	1 episode
1990	Super Force	Alexandria (as Julia Michaels)	1 episode
1991	Jake and the Fatman	Amy Cutler	1 episode
1992	Tales from the Crypt	Waitress (uncredited)	1 episode
1992	Sunset Beat	Cinnimon/Cinnamon	2 episodes
1994	Married... with Children	Cage Dancer (uncredited)	1 episode
1995	Space: Above and Beyond	Silicate UC (uncredited)	2 episodes
1995–1998	Baywatch	Catherine Moore, Caitlin's Sister (uncredited), Frat Girl, Woman (uncredited)	4 episodes
1997	Baywatch Nights	Catherine	1 episode
1997	Buffy the Vampire Slayer	Blond Vamp Ford Lets Go (uncredited)	1 episode
1997	House of Frankenstein	Vampire	2 episodes
1999	The Strip	Marilyn Monroe Look Alike #2	1 episode
2000	Martial Law	Woman on Bike (uncredited)	1 episode
2004	She Spies	Julie	1 episode
2004	Clubhouse	Female Fan	1 episode
2005	Desperate Housewives	Slutty Woman	1 episode
2006	In Justice	Florist	1 episode
2006	House	Fashion Show Patron (uncredited)	1 episode
2006	Ghost Whisperer	Barrista	1 episode
2006	Smith	Pedestrian	1 episode
2006	Sleeper Cell	California Blonde (uncredited)	1 episode
2006	Passions	Female Bar Patron #2	3 episodes
2010	Weeds	Sandy	1 episode
2011	The Big Bang Theory	Professor (uncredited)	1 episode
2011–2013	Southland	Mother, Carjacked Woman, Accident Victim (uncredited)	3 episodes
2017	SEAL Team	Stacey Marshall	1 episode
