= The Evil That Men Do (film) =

1984 film by J. Lee Thompson

- Theatrical release poster
- Directed by: J. Lee Thompson
- Written by: John M. Crowther; R. Lance Hill
- Based on: The Evil That Men Do (1978 novel) by David Lee Henry
- Produced by: Pancho Kohner
- Starring: Charles Bronson; Theresa Saldana; Joseph Maher; José Ferrer
- Cinematography: Javier Cruz Ruvalcaba
- Edited by: Peter Lee Thompson
- Music by: Ken Thorne
- Production companies: ITC Entertainment; Capricorn Productions
- Distributed by: Tri-Star Pictures (US); ITC Film Distributors (UK & Ireland)
- Release date: September 21, 1984
- Running time: 90 minutes
- Countries: United States; United Kingdom
- Language: English
- Budget: $4.6 million
- Box office: $13.1 million

The Evil That Men Do is a 1984 American action thriller film directed by J. Lee Thompson and starring Charles Bronson, Theresa Saldana, Joseph Maher and José Ferrer. It is adapted by R. Lance Hill (under the alias ‘David Lee Henry’) and John M. Crowther from Hill’s 1978 novel. Bronson plays a former assassin who comes out of retirement to avenge the death of his journalist friend at the hands of a torturer called "The Doctor", who works for various dictatorships worldwide, particularly those of Operation Condor.

The film was co-produced by ITC Entertainment and filmed entirely on-location in Guadalajara, Mexico. The Evil That Men Do marks the fifth collaboration between Bronson and director Thompson, following St. Ives (1976), The White Buffalo (1977), Caboblanco (1980), and 10 to Midnight (1983).

The film was released by Tri-Star Pictures on September 21, 1984, and received mixed reviews.

== Plot ==
In Suriname, Clement Molloch, referred to as "The Doctor", tortures journalist Jorge Hidalgo to death with electricity in front of government officials. Outside of the building, an Israeli Mossad team attempts to rig a bomb under the Doctor's car. The operation fails and one team member is killed.

In the Cayman Islands, Holland, a retired assassin, lives in relative peace. An old friend asks him to assassinate the Doctor. Though he initially refuses to intervene, after learning his friend Jorge was killed by him and watching video testimonies of Molloch's other torture victims around the world, including Chile and Asia, Holland changes his mind. He agrees to search for Molloch but wants to appear as a family man/tourist and therefore accompanies Jorge's widow Rhiana and her daughter Sarah into Guatemala, where the Doctor is based.

The three meet up with Max Ortiz, a friend, who takes them to a cockfighting ring frequented by Molloch. They are followed by an apparently crippled man, but Holland alerts him to his presence before he can attack, and he escapes. Later, Max takes them to Molloch's compound. Holland returns at night and sees the "crippled" man walking normally. He scopes out the lights and cameras for later.

Holland and Rhiana go to a bar in town for information. While Holland is at the bar, a large local man harasses Rhiana. Holland crushes his testicles, subduing him, and then kills him by crushing his neck while the bar crowd cheers. This catches the attention of another of Molloch's henchmen. Holland and Rhiana trick him into returning to their hotel for a "threesome", and Holland kills him with a knife. Rhiana is horrified and Holland demands she return home, as his mission is becoming dangerous. However, Rhiana refuses, wanting to see the Doctor killed in person.

Holland decides to draw the Doctor out by kidnapping his sister Claire. He breaks into her hotel room and awaits her return. She returns, but with her female lover, and Holland is forced to wait for her to leave, hiding under the bed during their romantic encounter. After she leaves, a male henchman comes in and begins rolling a joint. Holland apprehends him while Claire showers. He kidnaps Claire and throws the man off the balcony with a fire hose tied around his neck, hanging him publicly to cause a distraction for him and Claire to escape. They go to a ranch owned by Max and Holland advises Max to go into hiding.

Unbeknownst to Holland, Molloch has the local militia arrest Max, whom he tortures to reveal Holland's hideout. When Molloch calls to negotiate, he inadvertently reveals that he knows their location. Holland puts Claire in the trunk of a car, and he and Rhiana drive off. Assassins sent by the US ambassador (whom Molloch has paid off) follow, and after a shootout and chase, crash their car and die; Claire dies in Holland's trunk. Holland and Rhiana buy a local farmer's truck and head to the village of Magdalena. They are followed by the US ambassador and other thugs.

When Holland and Rhiana arrive, they meet a man who owns a cafe and phone. They go to his place to use the phone and are confronted by the ambassador and a gunman. Holland kills both men and calls Molloch, demanding he come alone to retrieve Claire from a nearby abandoned mine. At the mine, they find disfigured men looking for any remaining opal. They advise the men to leave because of danger approaching, but they refuse, going into hiding only when they see Molloch's car approaching.

Molloch reveals he has captured Rhiana's daughter, Sarah. Panicking because they do not have Claire, Holland plays a tape recording of her voice. Molloch runs into the open and the miners recognize him as the man who disfigured and tortured them. They approach his car and, becoming nervous when a miner hits him with a rock, the chauffeur holding Sarah is distracted and Holland kills him. Sarah runs to Rhiana and the miners encroach on Molloch in his car, breaking in and killing him with their hammers and picks. Holland, Rhiana and Sarah return safely to Holland's home in the Cayman Islands.

== Cast ==
- Charles Bronson as Holland / Bart Smith
- Theresa Saldana as Rhiana Rhead Hidalgo
- Joseph Maher as Clement "The Doctor" Molloch
- José Ferrer as Hector Lomelin
- Antoinette Bower as Claire Molloch
- Angélica Aragón as María
- René Enríquez as Max Ortiz
- John Glover as Ambassador Paul Briggs
- Raymond St. Jacques as Randolph Whitley
- Mischa Hausserman as Karl Hauser
- Jorge Luke as Cillero
- Jorge Humberto Robles as Jorge Hidalgo
- Nicole Thomas as Sarah Hidalgo
- Enrique Lucero as Colonel Aristos
- Roger Cudney as Cannell
- Constanza Hool as Isabel Lomelin
- Joe Seneca as Santiago
- Ernesto Gómez Cruz as Cafe Owner
- Anaís de Melo as Dominique

== Original novel ==
The film was based on a novel that was published in 1978. The Globe and Mail said "The elements of a good thriller are here. The action is well paced, Guatemala is evoked superbly as a backdrop and the research is impeccable. But this gives us only an ornate playing board without much of a game transpiring on the surface." The New York Times said "if it's action you crave, The Evil that Men Do is as lively as they come."

== Production ==
=== Development ===
Film rights were purchased in 1980 by a company consisting of Charles Bronson, his wife Jill Ireland, J. Lee Thompson and producer Pancho Kohner. They arranged for a script to be written. Kohner almost set up the movie at Cannon Films, who had a success making Death Wish II with Bronson, but Cannon refused to reimburse the cost of the screenplay and rights option. Bronson wound up making Ten to Midnight for Cannon directed by Thompson. Kohner succeeded in securing $4.6 million in finance for The Evil That Men Do from ITC Entertainment. It was the last of a three picture deal between ITC and Bronson, the first two being Love and Bullets and Borderline.

Thompson became involved in editing 10 to Midnight and dropped out of the movie. In March 1983 it was announced that Charles Bronson would star alongside his wife Jill Ireland with Fielder Cook to direct. Ireland decided to drop out and give her role to Theresa Saldana, an actress who had been the victim of a recent stalking attack and was struggling to re-establish herself.

=== Writing ===
The movie's first draft was written by the novel's writer, R. Lance Hill (as per the terms of his contract). John Crowther was hired to rewrite the draft in the spring of 1982. Crowther was originally hired on a weekly contract, but when the producers realized the extent to which the script needed rewriting, it was drastically extended. Prior to rewriting the film's screenplay, Crowther had written the martial-arts, action movie Kill and Kill Again. Crowther had known Pancho Kohner—the movie's producer—for many years. It was Kohner who hired him to rewrite the script. In addition to this, Crowther had worked on Bronson's earlier movies. For example, he was an uncredited writer on Love and Bullets; and a casting director on 10 to Midnight.

According to Crowther, Hill's script was of poor quality, and the producers knew that it would need "major rewrites". In Crowther's opinion, there were "holes" in the logic of Hill's script. He gave an example where, in the novel, Molloch is said to have better security than an "Israeli Mossad". But in the reality of Hill's script, Molloch merely has "three lame-os" providing him with security. Crowther called Hill's premise "ridiculous". Crowther felt that it was a constant challenge to rewrite the script.

To make the movie more interesting, seven of the novel’s minor characters were cut from the script. In addition to this, a number of vignettes were also cut, including: Molloch’s surreal dream of being tortured in a concentration camp by Josef Mengele.

=== Filming ===
Filming took place entirely on-location in Guadalajara, Mexico, beginning in March 1983. Producer Pancho Kohner and executive producer Lance Hool were on set for the entire time of filming.

When the unit went to Mexico, Fielder Cook was still director. Crowther says that during pre production "it became painfully obvious after about a week or so that Fielder was really not up to this" and the director was fired. J. Lee Thompson was called in to replace him only days before filming was to start.

Bronson was contracted to film at least eight hours a day. According to Crowther, because Bronson's family was with him on set, he would not work more hours than what was stated in his contract. Kohner said that during filming, Thompson was very proficient and knew exactly what shots he wanted to capture.

== Release ==
=== Box office ===
The Evil That Men Do had box office sales of $4,538,400 in 1,464 theaters on its opening weekend of September 21, 1984 and ultimately making a gross of $13,102,025.

=== Home media ===
The film was released on Blu-Ray by Shout Factory in July 2026.

== Reception ==
Rotten Tomatoes, a review aggregator, reports that 40% of five surveyed critics gave the film a positive review; the average rating was 4.8/10. Metacritic, which uses a weighted average, assigned the film a score of 31 out of 100, based on 5 critics, indicating "generally unfavorable" reviews.

=== Critical response ===
Janet Maslin of The New York Times wrote that audiences want to see Bronson kill people, and the film delivers many audience-pleasing kills. Time Out called it "a clumsy catalogue of pain and death".

Fred Lutz of the Toledo Blade identified the film as a comeback for Bronson. Dan Lorentz of the Milwaukee Sentinel wrote that the film is violent and exploitative, but it will probably satisfy fans of Bronson.

The Washington Post wrote: "But for all the effort it costs him, he could be shooting tin cans off a log by way of passing a lazy summer's afternoon. Bronson's persona -- the cool, controlled professional vigilante -- is so cool this time as to be near comatose. It's one thing to know that Bronson will ultimately prevail over the meanies who cross his path on an average of once every 10 minutes. But "The Evil That Men Do" never allows its indomitable hero to experience a moment's jeopardy."

== See also ==
- Guatemalan genocide
