= Jay Acovone =

American actor (born 1955)

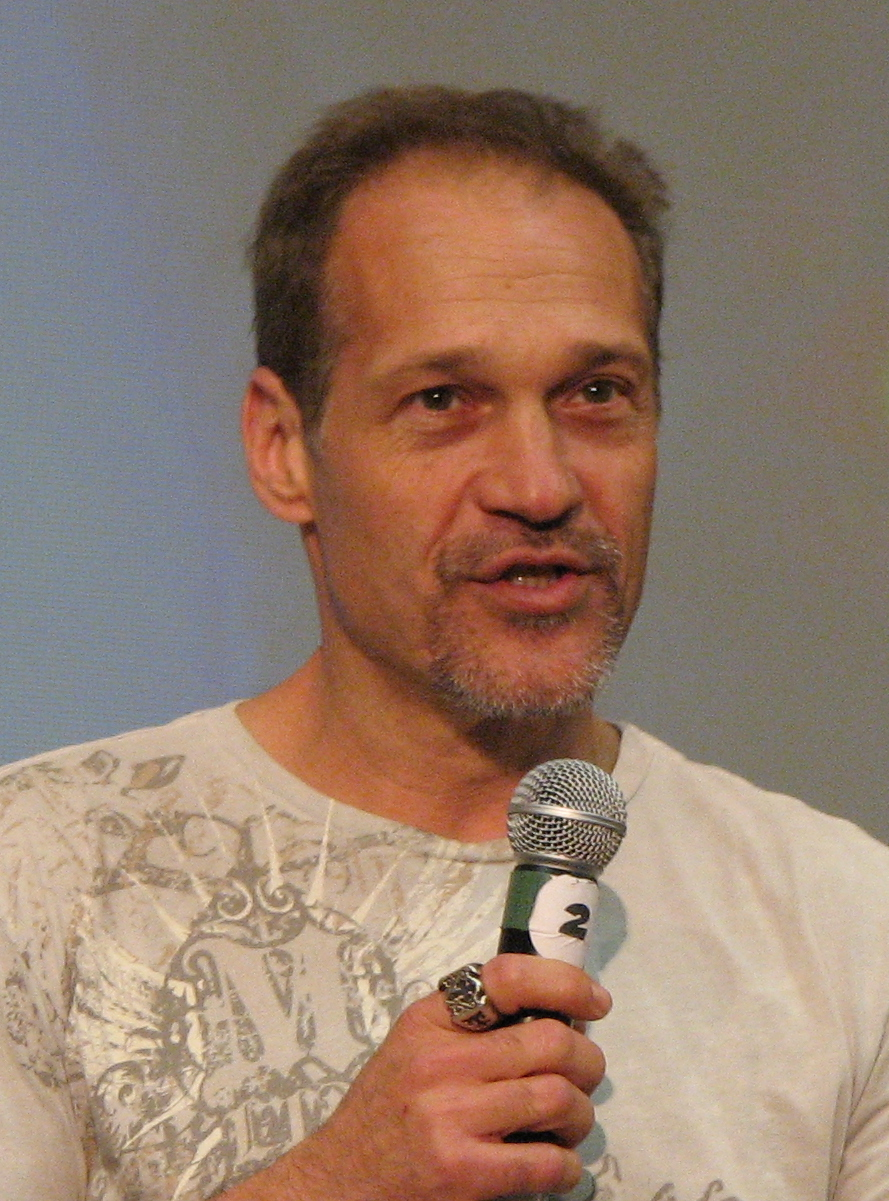
- Acovone in 2007
- Born: August 20, 1955 (age 71); New York City, New York, U.S.
- Occupation: Actor
- Years active: 1980–present

Jay Acovone (born August 20, 1955) is an American actor who is best known for portraying major Charles Kawalsky in Stargate SG-1.

== Early life ==
Acovone was born in New York City. His family later moved to Mahopac, New York where his parents owned a dry-cleaning business.

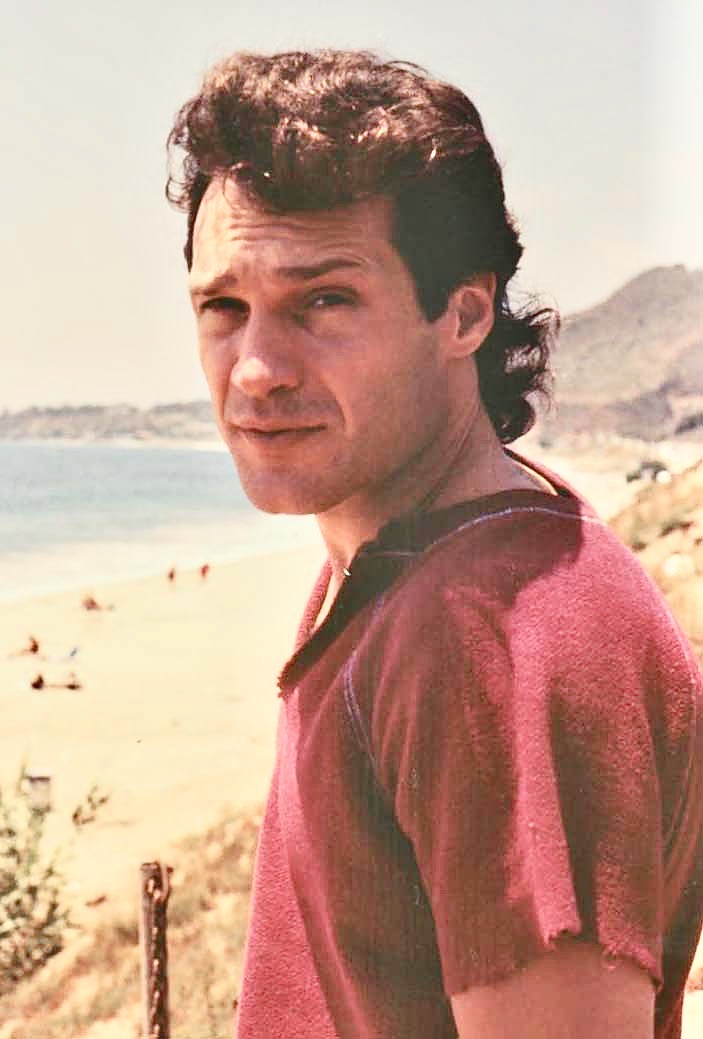
Jay Acovone in Malibu 1989

== Career ==
Acovone has over 100 credits to his name spanning four decades of work in film and television. His television appearances include Search for Tomorrow as Brian Emerson; Beauty and the Beast where he played D.A. Joe Maxwell over the show's three season run; and Hollywood Beat. In a connection to his Beauty and the Beast co-star Linda Hamilton, he can be seen playing the officer pulling over the TX Terminator in Terminator 3.

In 2016, he acted in the motion capture video game Mafia III (2K Games), playing the role of an Italian Mafia boss and main antagonist of the game, Sal Marcano.

== Personal life ==
He is divorced from his former manager, the late Fonda St. Paul. He is currently married to Carrie.

== Filmography ==
=== Film ===
Year	Title	Role	Notes
1980	Cruising	Skip Lee	
1980	Times Square	Plainclothes Cop	
1987	Cold Steel	"Cookie"	
1991	Out for Justice	Bobby "Arms"	
1992	Doctor Mordrid	Tony Gaudio	
1992	Stepfather 3	Steve Davis	
1993	Conflict of Interest	Detective Bob Falcone	
1994	Lookin' Italian	Vinny Pallazzo	
1994	Cercasi successo disperatamente		
1995	Crosscut	Frank	
1996	Independence Day	Area 51 Guard	
1996	Foxfire	Chuck	
1996	Crash Dive	Murphy	
1996	Snitch	MacElroy	
1997	Opposite Corners	"Puggy"	
1997	The Peacemaker	Cop	
1997	Time Under Fire	Schmidt	
1998	The Get	Michael Irish	
1999	Molly	Jack, The Bartender	
2000	The Amati Girls	Mr. Moltianni	
2000	Cast Away	Pilot Peter	
2001	The Seventh Sense	Melvin Snow	Short
2001	Crocodile Dundee in Los Angeles	Eric	
2002	Collateral Damage	Bennie	
2003	Studio City	Bobby Falcone	Short
2003	Terminator 3: Rise of the Machines	Cop, Westside Street	
2003	S.W.A.T.	Lear Jet Pilot	
2004	Rancid	Captain Peters	
2005	Sharkskin 6	Molina	
2005	Mobsters and Mormons	Jackie	
2006	Paved with Good Intentions	John Barrhauser	
2006	World Trade Center	Donna's Male Neighbor	
2007	The Hills Have Eyes II	Wilson	
2007	Traci Townsend	Jesse	
2007	InAlienable	Gerhard	
2007	Shadow People	Eerie Man	
2009	My New SweetHeart	Jay	Short
2017	12 Round Gun	Ray Bruno	
2019	Rattlesnakes	Jamie Jarret	

=== Television ===
Year	Title	Role	Notes
1982	Parole	Leo	TV movie
1983–1984	Search for Tomorrow	Brian Emmerson	8 episodes
1985	Hollywood Beat	Detective Jack Rado	14 episodes
1986	Women of Valor	Captain Rader	TV movie
1987	Werewolf	Mick	Episode: "Running with the Pack"
1987	Down and Out in Beverly Hills	Eddie	Episode: "Jerry Jumps Right In"
1989	War and Remembrance	Quartermaster Maselli (Barracuda)	TV miniseries
1989	Hardball	Matelli	Episode: "The Out of Towner"
1990	Jake and the Fatman	Sonny Rosetti	Episode: "I'll Dance at Your Wedding"
1987–1990	Beauty and the Beast	District Attorney Joe Maxwell	55 episodes
1991	Growing Pains	Jake	Episode: "Carol's Carnival"
1992	Quicksand: No Escape	Detective Harris	TV movie
1992	Stepfather III	Steve Davis	TV movie
1992	Nails	Captain Evan Graham	TV movie
1992	A Murderous Affair: The Carolyn Warmus Story	Lieutenant Robert Carlino	TV movie
1993	Civil Wars	Neil Leeuwen	Episode: "Hit the Road, Jack"
1993	Marked for Murder	Minelli	TV movie
1993	The Commish	Nick Colette	Episode: "Family Business"
1993	Born to Run	Richie	TV movie
1993	The Magician	David Katz	TV movie
1990–1994	Murder, She Wrote	Lieutenant Nick Acosta / Sergeant Nick Acosta / Sergeant Vinnie Grillo	3 episodes
1994	Locals		TV movie
1987, 1995	Matlock	Joe Ahern / Dr. Bruce Jacobs	2 episodes
1995	Friends	Fireman Charlie	Episode: "The One with the Candy Hearts"
1995	Columbo	Bruno Romano	Episode: "Strange Bedfellows"
1995	High Tide		Episode: "Down South"
1996	Crime of the Century	Sergeant Wallace	TV movie
1996	Viper	Victor Rand	Episode: "Condor"
1996	The Sentinel	Gary Hendrickson	Episode: "Spare Parts"
1996	Red Shoe Diaries	Goucho	Episode: "The Forbidden Zone"
1997	Dark Skies	Max Kinkaid	Episode: "The Warren Omission"
1994, 1997	Renegade	Russell, The Burglar / Brother Mike	2 episodes
1997	On the Line	Captain Unander	TV movie
1997	Total Security	Tommy Annunziato	Episode: "Looking for Mr. Goombah"
1991–1998	Silk Stalkings	Joey Pantangelo / Detective Ray Quiller / Tony Fielding / Ray	4 episodes
1999	Diagnosis: Murder	Clifton Moloney	Episode: "Trapped in Paradise"
1999	Honey, I Shrunk the Kids: The TV Show	Frankie Beans	Episode: "Honey, It Takes Two to Mambo"
1999	Pensacola: Wings of Gold	Johnny Terelli	Episode: "True Stories"
1997–2000	Sliders	Stu / Ben Siegel III / Dr. Tassler	3 episodes
2000	The Pretender	Detective Stan Wilkins	2 episodes
2000	Murder, She Wrote: A Story to Die For	Lieutenant Bob Mankowski	TV movie
2000	The Dukes of Hazzard: Hazzard in Hollywood	B.B. Bascomb	TV movie
1995–2001	NYPD Blue	Raymond DiSalvo	3 episodes
2001	18 Wheels of Justice	Agent Billingsley	Episode: "A Place Called Defiance"
2001	The Invisible Man	O'Ryan	2 episodes
1997, 2001	The X-Files	Duffy Haskell / Detective Curtis	2 episodes
2002	Charmed	Keats	Episode: "Bite Me"
1999–2002	Providence	Vincent / Aldini	4 episodes
2004	Strong Medicine	Jimmy Gentile	Episode: "Quarantine"
2001, 2004	JAG	General Montrose / Colonel Harry R. Presser	2 episodes
2003	As the World Turns	Del Brakett	
2005	CSI: NY	Paul Gionetti	Episode: "Tri-Borough"
2005	Monk	Ray Galardi	Episode: "Mr. Monk Gets Stuck in Traffic"
1997–2005	Stargate SG-1	Major Charles Kawalsky	7 Episodes
2005	Cold Case	Tom Collison In 2005	Episode: "Kensington"
2005	Las Vegas	Ray Abazon	Episode: "Magic Carpet Fred"
2005	Criminal Minds	Detective Morrison	Episode: "Won't Get Fooled Again"
2006	24	Tom Wegman	Episode: "Day 5: 5:00 p.m.-6:00 p.m."
2008	General Hospital	Joe Smith	9 episodes
2008	Children of the Gods	Major Charles Kawalsky	(Video)
2011	How I Met Your Mother	Vance	Episode: "Field Trip"
2011	Prime Suspect	Detective of The Month Award Presenter	Episode: "The Great Wall of Silence"
2012	The Mentalist	Nicky Shaw	Episode: "Pink Champagne on Ice"
2012	Leverage	Samuel Busey	Episode: "The (Very) Big Bird Job"
2012	CSI: Crime Scene Investigation	Tommy Grazetti (Present Day)	Episode: "It Was a Very Good Year"
2012	Vegas	Nicky Tomisano	Episode: "Estinto"
2013	NCIS	Frankie Dean	Episode: "Prime Suspect"
2018	Lethal Weapon	Elliott Nunziata	Episode: "What the Puck"

=== Video games ===
Year	Title	Role	Notes
2016	Mafia III	Sal Marcano	Voice and mo-cap
