= Justice (2023 film) =

2023 documentary film by Doug Liman

- Directed by: Doug Liman
- Produced by: Amy Herdy
- Starring: Brett Kavanaugh (himself)
- Release date: 2023
- Running time: 85 minutes
- Country: United States
- Language: English

Justice is a 2023 documentary film about American Supreme Court Justice Brett Kavanaugh. The film was directed by Doug Liman. The film recounts the sexual assault allegations made against Kavanaugh, including the testimony of Christine Blasey Ford and Deborah Ramirez. It debuted on January 20, 2023, to a sold-out screening at the Sundance Film Festival.

It features a never-before-heard audio recording made by Partnership for Public Service president and CEO Max Stier, a Yale colleague of Kavanaugh's, that corroborates Ramirez's charges and suggests that Kavanaugh violated another unnamed woman. Stier relays that he witnessed Kavanaugh with his pants down with a group of rowdy soccer players forcing a drunk female freshman to hold Kavanaugh's penis. Stier goes on to explain that he had heard from classmates about Ramirez's similar encounter with Kavanaugh, which she personally describes in the film.

The documentary also highlights the narratives Kavanaugh advanced to sway public opinion and gain support of Republicans. It suggests that Kavanaugh and his team were aware of Ford and Ramirez's charges before they became public and preemptively countered them by planting alternate narratives with friends and acquaintances.

== Reception ==
On Rotten Tomatoes, the film has an approval rating of 71% based on 7 reviews, with an average rating of 7/10.
