= Doctor Mordrid =

1992 film directed by Charles Band and Albert Band

- Promotional release poster
- Directed by: Albert Band; Charles Band
- Written by: C. Courtney Joyner
- Produced by: Charles Band
- Starring: Jeffrey Combs; Brian Thompson; Jay Acovone; Yvette Nipar
- Cinematography: Adolfo Bartoli
- Edited by: Lauren A. Schaffer
- Music by: Richard Band
- Production company: Full Moon Entertainment
- Distributed by: Full Moon Entertainment; Paramount Home Video
- Release date: September 24, 1992
- Running time: 74 minutes
- Country: United States
- Language: English

Doctor Mordrid is a 1992 American superhero film directed by Albert and Charles Band, and starring Jeffrey Combs. The film was originally intended to be an adaptation of Marvel Comics' Doctor Strange, but the studio's rights expired during pre-production. Full Moon elected to still produce the movie, with the character renamed, and enough other changes made to avoid a lawsuit.

== Plot ==
Anton Mordrid is a wizard sent to Earth by a being called the Monitor, to stop the evil wizard Kabal from opening the gate to Hell. Kabal needs the philosopher's stone and several alchemical elements to complete the spell and open the gate, unleashing his minions from the Fourth Dimension upon the Earth. Mordrid watches for signs of Kabal's presence for 150 years; as the time of their epic battle approaches, Mordrid assumes the role of a criminal psychologist, and becomes the mysterious landlord to Samantha Hunt, a research consultant to the police.

Dr. Mordrid detects a series of thefts of the elements that Kabal is seeking, and Mordrid begins to search for his nemesis. Samantha is persistent in her attempts to penetrate Mordrid's secretive life. The battle for Earth spills over into the Magic Dimension where the gate is closely guarded by other good wizards. They are no match for Kabal, who defeats all but one of them. This survivor confirms Kabal's plans for Mordrid, and Mordrid returns to Earth to prepare his defenses. When Mordrid is arrested for murder, Samantha attempts to help prove his innocence. Mordrid reveals his true nature and his mission to her, and she agrees to help him escape.

In the final showdown, Kabal and Mordrid do battle within the Cosmopolitan Museum with Kabal animating the Tyrannosaurus skeleton on display to threaten several police officers while he opens the portals to his demonic realm. Mordrid animates a nearby mastodon skeleton to battle the dinosaur while he deals with Kabal. Using his wits and his magical power, Mordrid narrowly manages to vanquish Kabal by having the mastodon impale him on its tusk while he's distracted, preventing the destruction of reality as we know it. His mission accomplished, Mordrid is called by The Monitor to cross over once again into the Magic Dimension and leave the Earth behind. Later that year on Christmas, he returns to Earth and spends time with Samantha, inviting her to come with him should he be called away again.

== Cast ==
- Jeffrey Combs as Dr. Anton Mordrid
- Yvette Nipar as Samantha Hunt
- Jay Acovone as Tony Gaudio
- Brian Thompson as Kabal
- Keith Coulouris as Adrian
- Ritch Brinkley as Gunner
- Pearl Shear as Sara Golden
- Murray Rubin as Mr. Berstein
- Jeff Austin as Detective Levitz
- John Apicella as Morrie
- Julie Michaels as Irene
- Mark Phelan as Officer 1
- Kenn Scott as Officer 2
- Scott Roberts as Fireman
- Steven Marca as Newscaster
- Jonathan Kruger as Armored Car Driver

== Production ==
The film was produced by Charles Band and co-directed by Band and his father, Albert Band. It was written by C. Courtney Joyner and released by Full Moon Features. The Bands, which previously made successful B-films such as Robot Jox and Re-Animator, had used their influence to get a license to produce a Doctor Strange film from Marvel Entertainment. Pre-production took long enough that by the start of production, the Bands had lost the license. Rather than scrap what they had done, they rebranded the film as Doctor Mordrid and made changes to the plot to avoid the copyright problems with Doctor Strange.

Some sources claim the movie was never intended to be based on Doctor Strange. The main character was reportedly going to be called "Doctor Mortalis" when Empire International Pictures had the project, and concept art was created by Jack Kirby.

== Release ==
Doctor Mordrid was released direct to video on VHS in 1992. The film received a DVD release in 2012. The film was released on Blu-ray for the first time in 2014. In 2017, a collector’s edition steelbook was released exclusively in Germany, including both Blu-ray and DVD copies of the film along with new bonus features.

== Legacy ==
The film was featured on Season 13 of the cult TV series Mystery Science Theater 3000 on June 10, 2022.

== Canceled sequels ==
Two sequels were planned for Doctor Mordrid, titled Doctor Mordrid II: Crystal Hell and Doctor Mordrid III: Shadow Queen. Reportedly, both films were scrapped after Full Moon Features ended its distribution deal with Paramount Pictures in 1995.

== Other media ==
Dr Mordrid appears in the third issue of Dollman Kills the Full Moon Universe, a crossover comic featuring Brick Bardo from Dollman tracking down different Full Moon monsters and villains to kill, published by Full Moon Comix in 2018.
