= Out for Justice =

1991 film directed by John Flynn

- Theatrical release poster
- Directed by: John Flynn
- Written by: R. Lance Hill (as David Lee Henry)
- Produced by: Steven Seagal; Arnold Kopelson
- Starring: Steven Seagal; William Forsythe; Jerry Orbach; Jo Champa
- Cinematography: Ric Waite
- Edited by: Don Brochu; Robert A. Ferretti; Michael Eliot
- Music by: David Michael Frank
- Production company: Warner Bros.; Kopelson Productions; Seagal/Nasso Productions; San Rocco Productions
- Distributed by: Warner Bros.
- Release date: April 12, 1991 (U.S.)
- Running time: 91 minutes
- Country: United States
- Language: English
- Budget: $14 million
- Box office: $39,673,161 (U.S.)

Out for Justice is a 1991 American crime action film directed by John Flynn, from a screenplay by R. Lance Hill, starring and co-produced by Steven Seagal. Seagal plays Gino Felino, a veteran New York City police detective who sets out to avenge his partner murder by killing the trigger-happy, drug-addicted mafioso culprit (played by William Forsythe). The cast also features Jerry Orbach, Jo Champa, Gina Gershon, Dominic Chianese and Julianna Margulies in her film debut.

The film was released theatrically by Warner Bros. on April 12, 1991. Out for Justice received mixed-to-negative reviews, but was a commercial success.

== Plot ==
Gino Felino is a NYPD detective from Dyker Heights in Brooklyn, who has strong ties within his neighborhood. Gino's partner Bobby Lupo is murdered by Richie Madano, who shoots him multiple times in broad daylight in front of his wife and children. The three of them had previously grown up together as children.

Though nominally an enforcer for a local mafia family, Richie is a homicidal and psychotic drug addict now on an unsanctioned killing spree. His small group of henchmen are horrified by what he does, but follow him with the promise of a vault's contents of ill-gotten money at the end of the night.

Knowing Richie won't leave Brooklyn until all his deadly scores are settled, Gino asks his captain Ronnie Donziger for clearance for a manhunt, which is granted. Gino visits his mob connection, Frankie, and his boss, Don Vittorio, and tells them he will get in the way of their plans to take out Richie, whom they view as a loose cannon and a liability. While driving, Gino sees a fellow driver discard something moving from his car. Upon investigating, Gino rescues an abandoned German Shepherd puppy.

Gino starts the hunt for Richie at a bar run by Richie's brother, Vinnie. Vinnie and his friends refuse to provide information, so Gino beats up several of them, to no avail. Gino attempts to coax Richie out of hiding by arresting his sister Pattie and by talking to his estranged, elderly father.

Afterwards, Gino and his wife, Vicky, who are in the middle of a divorce, decide not to get one and reconcile, but they, along with their son, Tony, are attacked by Richie's men when they storm into their apartment. Gino kills them all and saves his wife and son. Richie later comes back to the bar and beats up Vinnie for not killing Gino earlier. He also has information leaked to the mob that he is at the bar, then emerges from hiding and ambushes the mob's hitmen in a shoot-out.

After visiting a number of local hangouts and establishments trying to find information, Gino discovers Richie killed Bobby because Bobby was having an affair with two women – Richie's girlfriend, Roxanne Ford, and a waitress named Terry Malloy. When Gino goes to Roxanne's home, he finds her dead. Gino believes that Richie killed Roxanne before he killed Bobby. Gino goes to Laurie's house and tells the widow what is going on. In Laurie's purse, Gino finds the picture that Richie dropped on Bobby's body after killing him. Bobby turns out to have been a corrupt cop who wanted a money-making lifestyle like Richie's, and Laurie knew it. Laurie had found a picture of Bobby and Roxanne having sex. She had given Richie the picture out of jealousy, never expecting Richie to kill Bobby in retaliation. Laurie took the picture away from where Richie dropped it on Bobby because she wanted to protect her husband's reputation.

Following a tip from his local snitch, Gino eventually finds Richie in a house in the old neighborhood owned by his girlfriend Rica. At the same time, a mob hit squad arrives to kill Richie. Gino gets Rica out, before taking out all of Richie's men one-by-one. Confronted by Richie with an empty gun, the two have a brutal fight to death, with Gino killing Richie with a corkscrew through his forehead. He then uses the lead mobster's gun to shoot the already-dead Richie several times, then tells him to return to his boss and take credit for Richie's death.

Gino and his wife adopt the puppy as a family pet, naming him Coraggio (Italian for courage or bravery). Whilst visiting Coney Island, they encounter the same man who abandoned the puppy earlier, and Gino confronts him. When the man attacks him, Gino defends himself, knocking the man down. Gino and his wife laugh as the puppy urinates on the man's head.

== Cast ==
- Steven Seagal as Det. Gino Felino
- William Forsythe as Richie Madano
- Jerry Orbach as Capt. Ronnie Donziger
- Jo Champa as Vicky Felino
- Sal Richards as Frankie
- Gina Gershon as Pattie Madano
- Julianna Margulies as Rica
- Shareen Mitchell as Laurie Lupo
- Kent McCord as Jack
- Ronald Maccone as Don Vittorio
- Anthony DeSando as Vinnie Madano
- Dominic Chianese as Mr. Madano
- Vera Lockwood as Mrs. Madano
- George Vallejo as Picolino
- Robert LaSardo as Bochi
- Jay Acovone as Bobby "Arms"
- Nicky Corello as Joey "Dogs"
- Jerry Clauri as Bennie "The Book"
- Jorge Gil as Chas "The Chair"
- Thomas F. Duffy as Det. O'Kelly
- Joe Spataro as Det. Bobby Lupo
- Gianni Russo as Sammy
- Joe Lala as Vermeer
- Raymond Cruz as Hector
- Carl Ciarfalio as Paulie
- Shannon Whirry as Terry Malloy
- Julie Strain as Roxanne Ford
- Dan Inosanto as "Sticks"
- Julius Nasso Jr. as Tony Felino
- John Toles-Bay as King
- John Leguizamo as Boy in Alley
- Cameron as Go Go Dancer
- Kane Hodder as Gang Member (uncredited)

== Production ==
=== Writing ===
John Flynn later claimed the original title was The Price of Our Blood, "meaning Mafia blood. That was the title that Steven and I wanted, but Warner Bros. said no. It had to be a three-word title like the other Steven Seagal films (Above the Law, Hard to Kill, and Marked for Death)." During filming, the working title was The Night. Seagal claimed to have completely rewritten the original script, though only R. Lance Hill (under his pen name David Lee Henry) was credited on the final film.

The story was inspired by the death of Costabile “Gus” Farace. Farace was a Bonanno family associate who became the subject of a manhunt by both law enforcement and his own mob cronies after killing an undercover DEA agent. He was eventually caught and killed by a mob assassin in November 1989. The incident was also dramatized in a made-for-television film, Dead and Alive: The Race for Gus Farace, also released in 1991.

=== Filming ===
Filming took place on-location in the Brooklyn borough of New York City, and in Los Angeles. Flynn repeatedly clashed with Seagal during filming, later recalling:

I really liked working with Bill Forsythe and Jerry Orbach and all those guys in the car who played the killers. But I didn't get along with Steven. He was always about an hour late for work and caused a lot of delays. We shot until October 31, 1990, because an IATSE strike was threatened. Warner Bros. told us we had to be on a plane by November 1. So we shot for about a month in Brooklyn. The rest of Out for Justice was shot in and around south Los Angeles. We filmed those scenes on Lacy Street, in a slummy area of old wooden buildings that could pass for Brooklyn.

==== Gene LeBell incident ====
During filming, there was an alleged physical altercation between Seagal and stunt coordinator Gene LeBell. While on the production set, Seagal allegedly claimed that due to his aikido training, he was "immune" to being choked unconscious. At some point, LeBell, a 10th degree red belt in judo and experienced catch wrestler, heard about the claim and gave Seagal the opportunity to prove it. He supposedly placed his arms around Seagal's neck, and once Seagal said "go", choked him into unconsciousness, urination and defecation. The popularity of this incident led LeBell to be counted in 1992 as a potential additional member of Robert Wall's controversial "Dirty Dozen," a group of martial artists willing to answer to a public challenge made by Seagal.

Seagal has denied the incident ever took place, calling LeBell a "sick, pathological scumbag liar" and offered the name of a witness who could discredit the other account. After refusing to comment for many years, LeBell circumspectly referred to the story in 2012 in an Ariel Helwani when questioned on the matter in an interview; some outlets chose to consider this confirmation of the story, despite LeBell refusing to directly comment. He was quoted as saying: "When we had a little altercation or difference of opinion, there were thirty stuntmen and cameramen that were watching. Sometimes Steven has a tendency to cheese off the wrong people, and you can get hurt doing that." After being asked whether he was not going to directly confirm it, LeBell said: "Well, if thirty people are watching, let them talk about it."

Stuntman Steven Lambert, who was also Seagal's part-time bodyguard, stated he was present and said that a confrontation did happen. In Lambert's telling, Seagal explained to LeBell that he did not believe his choke hold was effective, and that he could escape from it. LeBell demonstrated the choke hold by putting it on Seagal. Without locking the hold, Seagal side stepped and swung his forearm backwards into his crotch. LeBell came off the floor by a few feet. As soon as he landed, LeBell used a foot sweep to sweep Seagal off the floor, with Seagal landing on his back. LeBell helped Seagal up.

==== Julianna Margulies incident ====
The film was the screen debut of Julianna Margulies. In her 2021 memoir Sunshine Girl, Margulies claimed Steven Seagal sexually harassed her during production, describing him as a sexual predator.

=== Editing ===
The film was originally much longer and included more plot and characters. Seagal reportedly cut some of William Forsythe's scenes because he felt that Forsythe was upstaging him. Also, Warner Bros. brought in editor Michael Eliot to re-edit the original cut of the movie so that it would be shorter and more profitable at the box office. Eliot did the same job on a few other Warner Bros. movies - Wes Craven's sci-fi horror Deadly Friend (1986) and Mark L. Lester's action movie Showdown in Little Tokyo (1991). Some scenes were deleted, and some others were cut for pacing, so two montage scenes with no dialogue are in the movie. Re-editing also caused some minor continuity mistakes.

The theatrical trailer shows two deleted scenes: Richie shooting inside a clothing store from which he took a new shirt (in his first few scenes, he is wearing one shirt, then all of a sudden, he is wearing another shirt for the rest of the movie), and a scene where the police captain tells Gino that body count is going up. Some TV versions of the movie included two deleted scenes: Richie stealing the new shirt from store because he got blood on it (also seen in trailer), and Richie and his guys breaking into the house where Gino's wife is and trying to find her, but leaving when some neighbors show up.

Further cuts were made after the film received an NC-17 rating for violence.

== Reception ==
=== Box office ===
Out for Justice debuted at number one for the U.S. box office, the third straight Seagal movie to do so. It eventually grossed $40 million, about a third less than his prior movie, Marked for Death.

=== Critical response ===
The movie received generally negative reviews. On Rotten Tomatoes, the film has an approval rating of 23% based on reviews from 22 critics. On Metacritic, the film has a score of 38 out of 100 based on reviews from 12 critics. Audiences polled by CinemaScore gave the film an average grade of "B+" on an A+ to F scale.

=== Censorship ===
Additional cuts for violence were made for the film's release overseas. In the United Kingdom in particular, several of the gruesome action scenes were trimmed for the video release, cutting the duration by 54 seconds. It was later released uncut for DVD.
