= Harry Tracy =

American Old West outlaw (1875–1902)

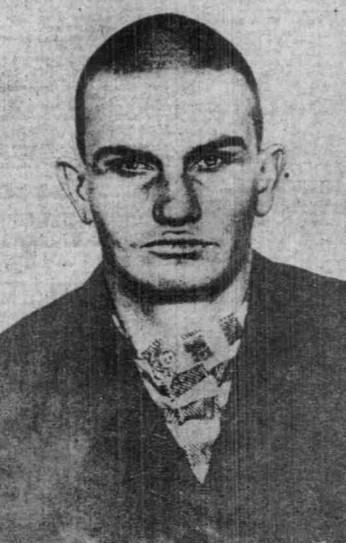
Tracy's mugshot as an inmate in the Oregon State Penitentiary

Harry Tracy (23 October 1875 – 6 August 1902) was an outlaw in the American Old West.

== Biography ==
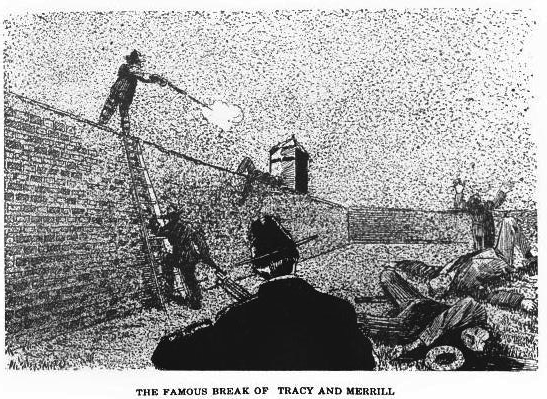
Depiction of Harry Tracy and David Merrill escaping from Oregon State Penitentiary

His real name was Harry Severns. Tracy is said to have run with Butch Cassidy and the Hole in the Wall Gang, but there is no evidence to this claim. By the time he had reached adulthood, he was actively taking part in acts of robbery and theft. On March 1, 1898, Tracy and three accomplices engaged in a gunfight at Brown's Park, Colorado, in which Valentine S. Hoy, a member of the posse, was killed. Tracy and accomplice David Lant from the Brown's Park gunfight were captured but escaped the Routt County Jail in Hahns Peak Village. They were recaptured and in June 1898 were sent to the Aspen jail. After a couple months both Tracy and Lant escaped again. Lant disappears from history, but Tracy made his way to Washington and Oregon. In late 1901, Tracy was captured, convicted, and incarcerated at the Oregon State Penitentiary.

In all the criminal lore of the country there is no record equal to that of Harry Tracy for cold-blooded nerve, desperation and thirst for crime. Jesse James, compared with Tracy, is a Sunday school teacher

— Seattle Daily Times, July 3, 1902

With fellow convict David Merrill he escaped on June 9, 1902, shooting and killing corrections officers Thurston Jones Sr., Bailey Tiffany, Frank Ferrell and three civilians in the process. His claim to infamy is the size and scope of the manhunt and the extensive media coverage of same. He evaded capture for a month, mostly taking refuge in the Seattle, Washington, area. On June 28, 1902, an argument broke out between him and Merrill, which ended in a duel. Tracy cheated during their duel and spun around early, and Merrill was killed. His body was found on July 14. On July 3, 1902, he set up an ambush near Bothell, Washington, where he killed detective Charles Raymond and deputy John Williams during a shootout. Tracy fled, took several hostages in a residence, and engaged other law enforcement officers in a shootout. During that shootout he killed posse member Cornelious Rowley and police officer Enoch Breece. On August 6, 1902, in Creston, Washington, Tracy was cornered and seriously wounded in the leg during an ambush by a posse from Lincoln County. Sheriff Gardner arrived and had his posse surround the field that Tracy had crawled into. Tracy committed suicide to avoid capture. The pistol Tracy used can be found on display at the White River Valley Museum in Auburn, Washington. Harry Tracy's death mask is on display at the Lincoln County Museum in Davenport, Washington.

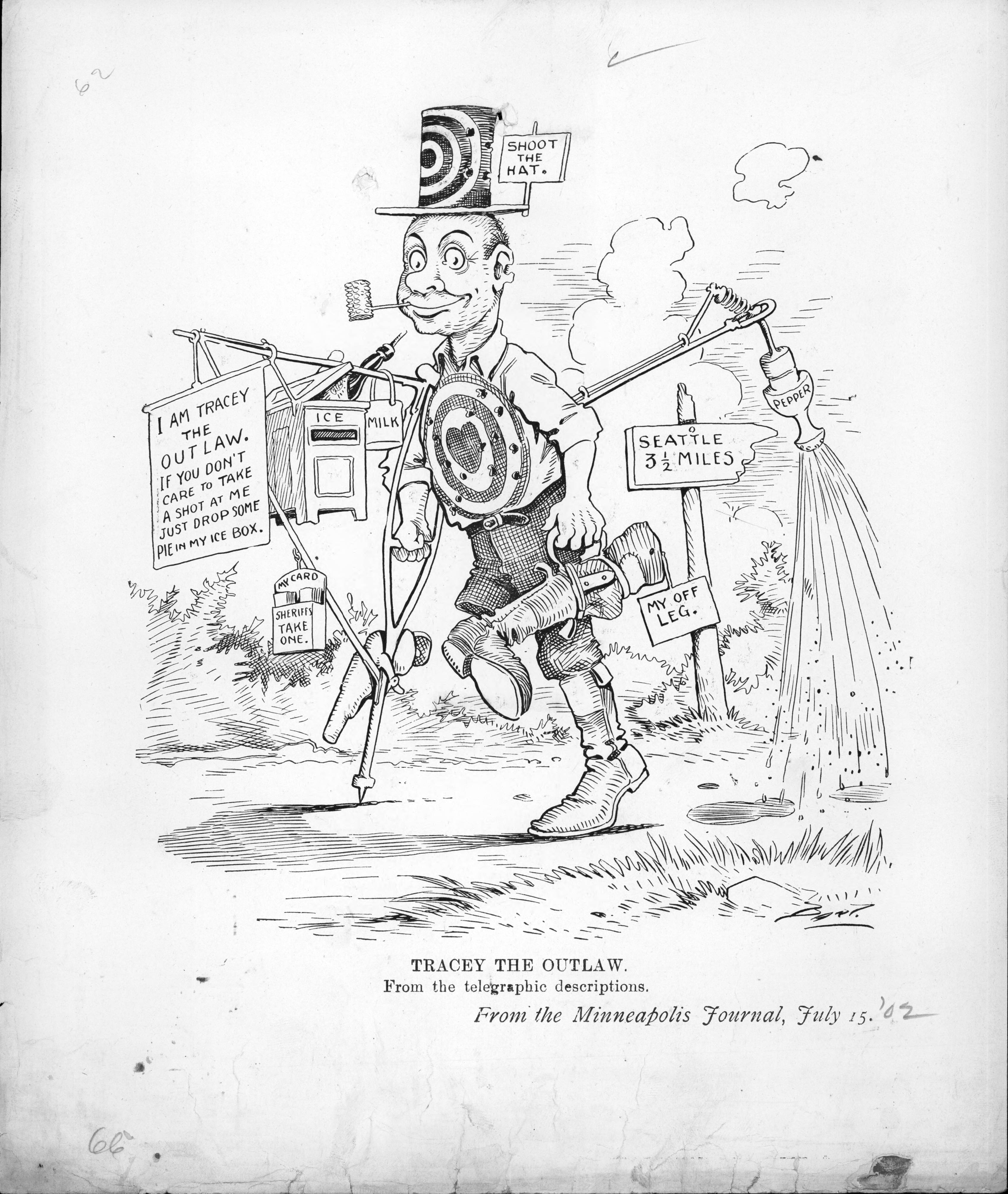
July 15, 1902 cartoon of Tracy

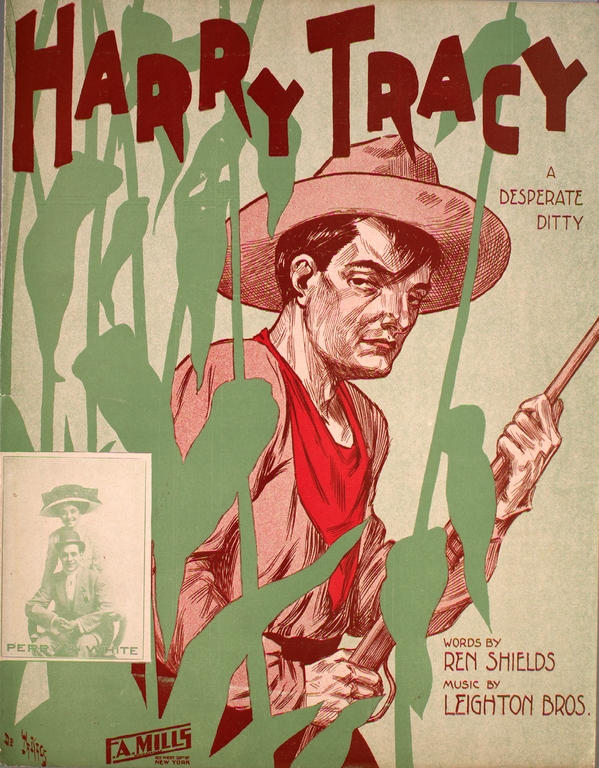
Harry Tracy: A Desperate Ditty sheet music cover (1911)

== Popular culture ==
Tracy was portrayed by the actor Steve Brodie in a 1954 episode of the syndicated television series, Stories of the Century, starring and narrated by Jim Davis.

Bruce Dern plays Tracy in the 1982 film Harry Tracy, Desperado.

Look Away by Scottish band Big Country is allegedly about the last stand of Harry Tracy.

== See also ==
- List of fugitives from justice who disappeared
