= Justice (2017 film) =

2017 film directed by Richard Gabai

Justice is a 2017 American western drama film directed by Richard Gabai, written by John Lewis, Shawn Justice, D.C. Rahe, and Jeff Seats, with music by Boris Zelkin, cinematography by Scott Peck, and starring Stephen Lang, Jamie-Lynn Sigler, Jackson Rathbone, and others. The film was produced by Chasing Butterflies Pictures, Splash House Pictures, and Check Entertainment; it was released on September 15, 2017.

Justice received mixed reviews from critics. Some reviews praised the performances and traditional Western atmosphere, while others noted its reliance on familiar genre tropes.

== Plot ==
A U.S. marshal wants justice for his brother's murder. He protects a small town from a corrupt mayor and his henchmen, who want to provoke a civil war.

== Cast ==
- Stephen Lang as Mayor Pierce
- Jamie-Lynn Sigler as Melissa
- Jackson Rathbone as Thomas McCord
- Robert Carradine as Stratton Collins
- Lesley-Anne Down as Elizabeth
- Ellen Hollman as Ginny
- Nathan Parsons as James McCord
- Quinton Aaron as Benjamin

== Reception ==
Blu-ray Review said, "The film does nothing to draw the audience in or make them care about any of the characters. It's a poor paint-by-numbers effort that gets the superficialities more or less right but fails to build on anything beyond."
