= Hollywood Beat =

1985 American television series

- Genre: Crime drama
- Created by: Henry Rosenbaum
- Starring: Jack Scalia; Jay Acovone
- Opening theme: "Hollywood Beat" performed by Natalie Cole
- Composers: Ken Harrison; Stewart Levin
- Country of origin: United States
- Original language: English
- No. of seasons: 1
- No. of episodes: 14 (6 unaired)

Production
- Executive producers: Aaron Spelling; Douglas S. Cramer
- Production locations: Los Angeles, California, United States
- Running time: 60 minutes
- Production company: Aaron Spelling Productions

Original release
- Network: ABC
- Release: September 21 – November 23, 1985

Hollywood Beat is an American crime drama series that aired on ABC from September 21 until November 23, 1985. starring Jack Scalia, Jay Acovone, Edward Winter and John Matuszak. The series aired on Saturday nights at 8:00 p.m Eastern time.

== Cast ==
- Jack Scalia as Det. Nick McCarren
- Jay Acovone as Det. Jack Rado
- John Matuszak as George Grinsky
- Edward Winter as Capt. Wes Biddle

== Episodes ==
| No. | Title | Directed by | Written by | Original release date | Prod. code |
|---|---|---|---|---|---|
| 1 | "Pilot" | Jerry London | Henry Rosenbaum | September 21, 1985 | 000 |
| 2 | "King of Diamonds" | James L. Conway | James L. Conway | September 28, 1985 | 001 |
| 3 | "Double Exposure" | Don Chaffey | Henry Rosenbaum | October 5, 1985 | 002 |
| 4 | "No Place to Hide" | Mike Robe | William T. Conway | October 12, 1985 | 003 |
| 5 | "Baby Blues" | Don Chaffey | Story by : Shea E. Butler; Teleplay by : Fred McKnight | November 2, 1985 | 006 |
| 6 | "Across the Line" | Joel Oliansky | Fred McKnight | November 9, 1985 | 006 |
| 7 | "The Long Weekend" "Love Hurts" | James L. Conway | S : Nancy Ann Miller; T : William T. Conway | November 16, 1985 | 008 |
| 8 | "Fast Hustle" | Charlie Picerni | Fred McKnight | November 23, 1985 | 009 |
| 9 | "Siege" | James L. Conway | Fred McKnight & William T. Conway | Unaired | TBA |
| 10 | "Let's Have Lunch" | Don Chaffey | Scott Shepherd | Unaired | TBA |
| 11 | "Dead Heat" "Green Heat" | Charlie Picerni | Story by : Michelle Ashford; Teleplay by : William T. Conway | Unaired | TBA |
| 12 | "Girls, Girls, Girls" | Charlie Picerni | Scott Shepherd | Unaired | TBA |
| 13 | "Connections" | Don Chaffey | Henry Rosenbaum | Unaired | TBA |
| 14 | "Out in the Cold" | Cliff Bole | Scott Shepherd | Unaired | TBA |
