= Harry Tracy, Desperado =

1982 Canadian drama Western film by William A. Graham

- Directed by: William A. Graham
- Written by: David Lee Henry; R. Lance Hill
- Produced by: Ronald I. Cohen; Sid & Marty Krofft
- Starring: Bruce Dern; Helen Shaver; Gordon Lightfoot; Michael C. Gwynne
- Cinematography: Allen Daviau
- Edited by: Ron Wisman
- Music by: Micky Erbe; Maribeth Solomon
- Production companies: Canadian Film Development Corporation (CFDC); Richard Cohen Productions; Sid & Marty Krofft Pictures
- Distributed by: Astral Films
- Release date: December 17, 1982
- Running time: 107 minutes
- Country: Canada
- Language: English
- Budget: $8.3 million

Harry Tracy, Desperado is a 1982 Canadian Western drama film directed by William A. Graham, and starring Bruce Dern, Helen Shaver, Gordon Lightfoot, and Michael C. Gwynne.

== Plot ==
By the end of the 19th century, Butch Cassidy, the Sundance Kid, John Wesley Hardin, and virtually all of the Old West's legendary outlaws are either dead or in jail pending execution-all of them, that is, except train robber and escape artist extraordinaire, Harry Tracy.

As the last survivor of the Wild Bunch, Harry pulls off a series of profitable robberies before making his way west to Portland, Oregon, in search of Catherine Tuttle, a judge's daughter with whom he is in love. Instead, Harry is betrayed, arrested, and imprisoned.

Tracy escapes and becomes the target of the largest manhunt in the history of North America. He seeks out Catherine, who joins him in his flight, and their love deepens under the constant threat of capture. With hundreds of posses and national guardsmen on their heels, Tracy knows that he has only two options: surrender or die. When a posse traps Tracy in a barn, he kills himself rather than return to jail.

== Cast ==
- Bruce Dern as Harry Tracy
- Helen Shaver as Catherine Tuttle
- Gordon Lightfoot as U.S. Marshal Morrie Nathan
- Michael C. Gwynne as David Merrill
- Lynne Kolber as Judy Tuttle
- Daphne Goldrick as Mrs. Tuttle
- Frank C. Turner as Eddie Hoyt
- Fred Diehl as Governor Raymond Millhouse
- Jack Ackroyd as Ely Porter
- Suzie Payne as Helen Porter
- Richard MacBride as Matt Porter
- Kerry Salisbury as Glendoline Porter
- Tom Braidwood as Aspen Storekeeper

== Production ==
Filming took place throughout Alberta and British Columbia, Canada. Nathan's farm was previously featured in the 1978 film Superman: The Movie.

The Portland street scenes including a period street-car were filmed in Victoria, B.C. where the pavement of a long block of Johnson Street was covered with dirt and rails were installed to replicate Portland of the era. Interior shots were done inside a local period house and horseback chase scenes were filmed along shoreline trails at Rathtrevor Beach Provincial Park. From 1946 to 1952, the old farm house and barn were owned by the Spiritual Community of Christ, a commune of former Sons of Freedom, and later bought by the Corry de Condelo family who rented it in 1980 for the movie.

== Accolades ==
- 1983
  - Genie Award for Best Achievement in Film Editing - Ron Wisman - Nominated
  - Genie Award for Best Achievement in Overall Sound - Rod Haykin, David Appleby, Don White - Nominated
  - Genie Award for Best Achievement in Sound Editing - Bruce Carwardine, Brian French, Glen Gauthier, Tim Roberts, Brian Rosen - Nominated
  - Genie Award for Best Motion Picture - Ronald I. Cohen - Nominee
  - Genie Award for Best Original Song - Leslie Pouliot - Nominee
  - Genie Award for Best Performance by a Foreign Actor - Bruce Dern - Nominated
  - Genie Award for Best Original Screenplay - David Lee Henry - Nominated

== See also ==
- Harry Tracy
