= Road House 2 (2006 film) =

2006 direct-to-video action film by Scott Ziehl

- Promotional release poster
- Directed by: Scott Ziehl
- Screenplay by: Miles Chapman; Johnathon Schaech; Richard Chizmar
- Story by: Miles Chapman
- Based on: Characters by David Lee Henry
- Produced by: Yoram Pelman
- Starring: Johnathon Schaech; Ellen Hollman; Richard Norton; Jake Busey; Will Patton
- Cinematography: Thomas L. Callaway
- Edited by: Edgar Burcksen
- Music by: Amotz Plessner
- Production companies: Metro-Goldwyn-Mayer; Sony Pictures Home Entertainment; Manyana Films
- Distributed by: Sony Pictures Home Entertainment
- Release date: July 18, 2006
- Running time: 86 minutes
- Country: United States
- Language: English

Road House 2 is a 2006 American direct-to-video action film, the sequel to Road House and second installment overall in the Road House franchise. Directed by Scott Ziehl from a script collaboratively written by Miles Chapman, Johnathon Schaech and Richard Chizmar which was based on an original story by Chapman; the events of the plot explore the career of James Dalton (Patrick Swayze)'s son. Schaech stars as a D.E.A. Agent Shane Tanner, who must protect a Louisiana bar from criminals. Road House 2 was released by Sony Pictures Home Entertainment on July 18, 2006.

== Plot ==
D.E.A. agent Shane Tanner is the son of a legendary cooler named James Dalton. Nate Tanner is Shane's uncle, and the owner of the Black Pelican, a bar located in Nate's new permanent home of Tyree, Louisiana. Nate gets a call from his rival, who is nicknamed "Wild Bill" Decarie, the former Black Pelican cooler who has been trying to steal it from Nate. Wild Bill asks Nate to meet him at a pier, supposedly to discuss a truce. Nate goes to the pier and is ambushed and beaten badly by Wild Bill.

Meanwhile, in New York City, Shane, along with other agents, bust drug dealers in a night club. Shane later gets a phone call about Nate being in the hospital and getting badly beaten. Shane gets Nate's location and leaves for Tyree. Shane takes off for local authorities to find out who ambushed Nate. Shane decides to stay in Nate's house and run the Black Pelican in Nate's absence, much to the dismay of Wild Bill. The location is best for drug-running, as the Black Pelican is close to the border. However, like Nate, Shane refuses to sell the bar and damages the numerous thugs that Wild Bill sends his way.

Shane also still looking for the murderer who killed Dalton, many years ago when Shane arrived home from work as a rookie Louisiana state trooper. After Dalton's murder, Shane left town and joined the DEA as a field agent. Now, Wild Bill's boss, Miami crime syndicate kingpin Victor Cross, decides that it is time to handle matters personally, since Wild Bill's men have not been doing a good job of taking care of Shane. Shane is soon faced with impossible odds and a low number of staff members at the Black Pelican.

To rid Louisiana of Victor, Wild Bill and their organization, Shane teams up with local school teacher and Wild Bill's cousin Beau Hampton, who has a military background. Soon, Beau and Shane take down Wild Bill and Victor. In the end, Victor is badly beaten and left at Beau's house and Wild Bill is impaled by the symbolic black pelican at the bar.

It is revealed that Victor had wanted Shane dead for a drug bust he did on Victor long ago as a state trooper. Victor had hired Wild Bill, then a cooler at the bar, to kill Dalton. Shane decides to stay in town since he can finally be at peace after finding Dalton's murderers and exacting justice from them.

== Cast ==
- Johnathon Schaech as Shane Tanner
- Ellen Hollman as Beau Hampton
- Richard Norton as Victor Cross
- Jake Busey as Wild Bill Decarie
- Will Patton as Nate Tanner
- Marisa Quinn as Nadja
- William Ragsdale as Sands Cooper
- Louis Herthum as Deputy Garland Hendricks
- Crystal Mantecón as Sherri
- Stuart Greer as Captain Chris Shilton
- Ritchie Montgomery as Embry Davis

== Reception ==
=== Critical response ===
Scott Weinberg of DVD Talk rated it 2.5/5 stars and called it a predictably "mindless, silly mess" that was made to capitalize on the first film's fandom. In a review of both films, Cam Lindsay of Exclaim! wrote that it was better to ignore the sequel and simply rewatch the original film instead.

== Remake ==
Road House, 2024 remake of preceding 1989 film directed by Doug Liman
