= R. Lance Hill =

Canadian screenwriter

- Born: 1943 (age 82–83); Canada
- Occupations: Screenwriter, novelist
- Writing career
- Pen name: David Lee Henry
- Language: English
- Years active: 1982–present
- Genres: Film, novels
- Notable works: 8 Million Ways to Die (1986); Road House (1989); Out for Justice (1991)

R. Lance Hill (born 1943), also known under the pen name David Lee Henry, is a Canadian screenwriter and novelist. He is best known for writing the 1989 cult film Road House, as well as the novel and screenplay for The Evil That Men Do.

== Career ==
Hill was raised in Canada, and wrote for the Canadian motor-sports magazine Track & Traffic in his early days.

He moved out to Hollywood after his first novel King of White Lady was optioned to be made into a film. In 1979, Monte Hellman was hired to adapt the book into a screenplay, and Francis Ford Coppola was attached to direct and produce through his American Zoetrope production banner, but the project was ultimately abandoned after Coppola became pre-occupied with the troubled production of Apocalypse Now. The book would go on to be optioned several more times, but as of today, remains unfilmed.

While waiting for King of White Lady to go into production at Paramount, Hill wrote a spec script about Harry Tracy, which would go on to become his first produced screenplay, Harry Tracy, Desperado. The film starred Bruce Dern and Helen Shaver and was nominated for several Genie Awards in 1983, including Best Original Screenplay. Fellow Canadian Gordon Lightfoot wrote music for the film, and also appears onscreen as U.S. Marshal Nathan.

Hill's next two scripts both sold and immediately went into production, culminating in the 1984 Charles Bronson film The Evil That Men Do, and the 1986 neo-noir thriller 8 Million Ways to Die. The latter of which starred Jeff Bridges, Rosanna Arquette, and Andy Garcia, and was the final film of Hal Ashby. It was also the first attempt to adapt the Matthew Scudder detective stories of Lawrence Block for the screen, which proved to be difficult. The studio brought on both Oliver Stone, and Robert Towne to do drafts of the script, before ultimately going back to Hill for the final draft.

Hill's next script was for United Artists, the 1989 film Road House. Directed by Rowdy Herrington and starring Patrick Swayze as a cooler at a newly refurbished roadside bar who protects a small Missouri town from a corrupt businessman, the film would go on to become a beloved cult classic.

Hill's last on-screen credit was 1991's Out for Justice, starring Steven Seagal, although he was credited for "original characters" on the 2006 direct-to-video action film Road House 2.

In February 2024, Hill sued the producers of the 2024 Road House remake film, alleging the producers used generative AI of the film's actors, in defiance of the SAG-AFTRA collective bargaining agreement. Hill had previously moved to regain copyright to his original Road House screenplay.

== Filmography ==
- Harry Tracy, Desperado (1982)
- The Evil That Men Do (1984)
- 8 Million Ways to Die (1986)
- Road House (1989)
- Out for Justice (1991)
- Road House 2 (2006) (Characters only)
- Road House (2024) (Story only)
