= Road House 2 (upcoming film) =

- Directed by: Ilya Naishuller
- Written by: Will Beall
- Based on: Characters by David Lee Henry
- Produced by: Charles Roven; Alex Gartner; Jake Gyllenhaal; Josh McLaughlin; Joel Silver
- Starring: Jake Gyllenhaal; Dave Bautista; Aldis Hodge; Iko Uwais; Jay Hieron; Leila George; Andrew Bachelor; Peter Sarsgaard; Rob Delaney
- Production companies: Metro-Goldwyn-Mayer; Silver Pictures; Atlas Entertainment; Nine Stories Productions
- Distributed by: Amazon MGM Studios
- Country: United States
- Language: English

Road House 2 is an upcoming American action film directed by Ilya Naishuller and written by Will Beall. It serves as the sequel to Road House (2024). Jake Gyllenhaal and Jay Hieron reprise their roles from the first film, alongside Dave Bautista, Aldis Hodge, Iko Uwais, Leila George, Andrew Bachelor, Peter Sarsgaard, and Rob Delaney.

== Cast ==
- Jake Gyllenhaal as Dalton
- Jay Hieron as Jax "Jetway" Harris
- Leila George
- Dave Bautista
- Aldis Hodge
- Rico Verhoeven
- Michael Chandler
- Michael Page
- Dustin Poirier
- Stephen Thompson
- Tyron Woodley
- Andrew Bachelor
- Iko Uwais
- Hidetoshi Nishijima
- Peter Sarsgaard
- Rob Delaney

== Production ==
In May 2024, Amazon MGM Studios announced that a sequel to Road House (2024) was officially in development, with Jake Gyllenhaal reprising his role as Dalton, as well as serving as a producer on the film. In April 2025, Guy Ritchie was hired to direct, and Will Beall to write the screenplay. In June, Dave Bautista was offered a role. In July, Ritchie exited the project. Later that month, Ilya Naishuller was in talks to direct. In August, Dave Bautista and Leila George joined the cast in undisclosed roles, with Naishuller confirmed to direct. In September, Aldis Hodge joined the cast. In November, six professional fighters were added to the cast along with Jay Hieron, who is returning to reprise his role in the sequel. Andrew Bachelor, Iko Uwais, Hidetoshi Nishijima, Peter Sarsgaard, and Rob Delaney were also added to the cast.

=== Filming ===
Principal photography began in October 2025 in the United Kingdom, Malta, and Savannah, Georgia.
