= Ellen Hollman =

American actress

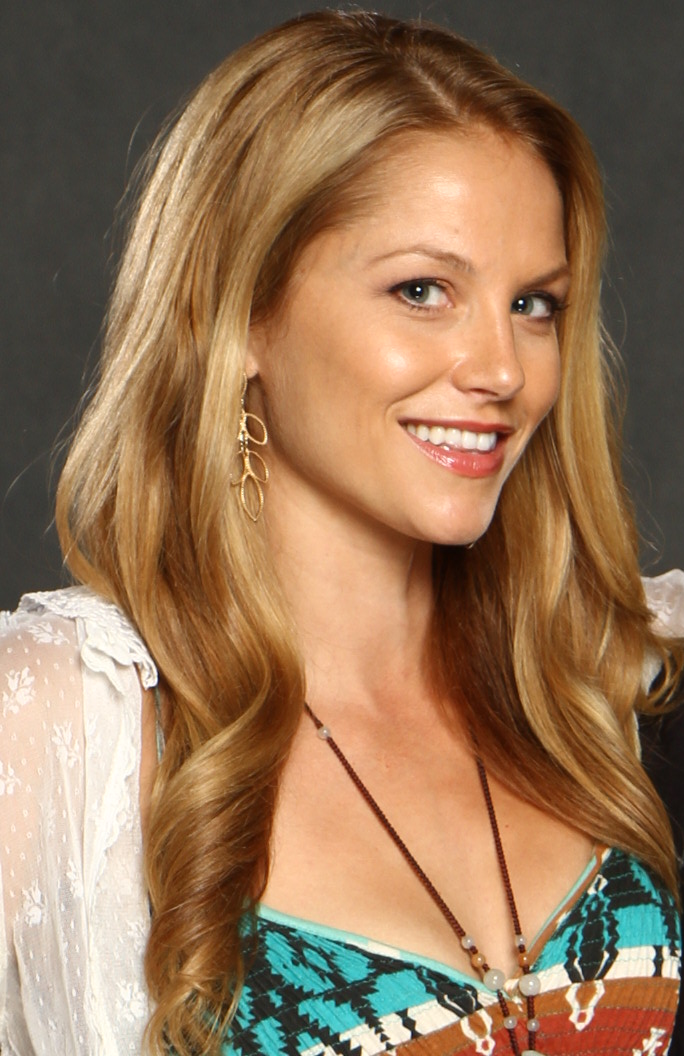
- Hollman at the 2014 Florida SuperCon
- Born: April 1, 1983 (age 43); Detroit, Michigan
- Occupation: Actress
- Years active: 2005–present

Ellen Hollman (born April 1, 1983) is an American actress. She is known for her roles on television, including Saxa in the Starz series Spartacus: Vengeance (2012) and Spartacus: War of the Damned (2013), and Zypher in AMC's Into the Badlands (2015). Her film appearances include Road House 2 (2006), Love and Monsters (2020), and The Matrix Resurrections (2021).

== Career ==
Hollman's early film and television credits included Road House 2: Last Call, Surf School, Asylum, Skateland, Rules of Engagement, Numb3rs, Medium,, Victorious, Weeds, In Plain Sight, Criminal Minds, NCIS, and Malcolm in the Middle. She later played Saxa in the Starz series Spartacus: Vengeance and Spartacus: War of the Damned. In 2015, she appeared as Zypher in AMC's Into the Badlands. Her later film roles included Love and Monsters, Army of One, and The Matrix Resurrections, released in 2021.

== Personal life ==
Hollman was also associated with Visual Impact Now, a Los Angeles-based nonprofit that partnered with OneSight to provide eye exams and glasses to children and families unable to afford them.

== Filmography ==
=== Film ===
Year	Title	Role	Notes
2006	Road House 2	Beau Hampton	Direct-to-video
2006	Surf School	Megan	
2008	Asylum	Ivy	
2008	Fling	Alison	
2010	Skateland	Deana Trammel	
2010	Sinatra Club	Jane	
2011	Last Halloween	Jett	Short film
2012	True Love	Kate Sunderland	
2015	The Scorpion King 4: Quest for Power	Valina Reskov	Direct-to-video
2015	Shepherd's Blade	Kat Kelly	Short film
2016	Jack and Jill	Jill	Short film
2016	The Secrets of Emily Blair	Emily Blair	
2017	Justice	Ginny	
2017	The Good Nanny	Lily Walsh	
2020	Love and Monsters	Dana	
2020	Army of One	Brenner Baker	Also producer
2021	The Matrix Resurrections	Echo	
2023	Inside Mam	Carol Allen	
2023	Don't Suck	Stephanie	Also producer

=== Television ===
Year	Title	Role	Notes
2005	Sex, Love & Secrets	Bartender	Episode: "Secrets"
2005	Malcolm in the Middle	Maayke	Episode: "Blackout"
2006	NCIS	Tina Larsen	Episode: "Family Secret"
2007	The O.C.	Young Kirsten Nichol	Episode: "The Case of the Franks"
2007	Criminal Minds	Vickie Wright	Episode: "True Night"
2009	In Plain Sight	Amy Atkins / Amy Adams	Episode: "Gilted Lily"
2009	Weeds	Tenly	Episode: "Where the Sidewalk Ends"
2009	Numbers	Lola Sacco	Episode: "Con Job"
2010	Medium	Mallory Kessinger	Episode: "Will the Real Fred Rovick Please Stand Up?"
2010	Victorious	Melinda Murray	Episode: "Beck's Big Break"
2011	Rules of Engagement	Maya	Episode: "Double Down"
2012	Spartacus: Vengeance	Saxa	Supporting role
2013	Spartacus: War of the Damned	Saxa	Supporting role
2014	CSI: Crime Scene Investigation	Janet Riggins / Helen Morrison	Episode: "Keep Calm and Carry-On"
2014	A Perfect Christmas List	Sara	Television film
2015	NCIS	Tina Larsen	Episode: "Status Update"
2015	Into the Badlands	Zypher	Recurring role
2016	Lethal Weapon	Angela Carlson	Episode: "Best Buds"
2017	Six	Gloria Taggart	2 episodes
2017	Sharing Christmas	Stephanie	Television film
2018	NCIS: New Orleans	Amelia Parsons Stone	5 episodes
2019	9-1-1	Tara d'Agostino	3 episodes
2019	Hawaii Five-0	Olivia Parks	Episode: "Ka Ia'au kumu 'ole o Kahilikolo"

=== Web series ===
Year	Title	Role	Notes
2020	Gambit: Play for Keeps	Rogue	Short web film
