= Chuck Mondry =

American screenwriter (born 1968)

- Born: Charles Mondry
- Occupation: Screenwriter

Charles Mondry (born 1968) is an American screenwriter. He is best known for co-writing the reboot of MGM's Road House (2024), starring Jake Gyllenhaal and directed by Doug Liman. And Play Dirty (2025), an adaptation of Donald Westlake's Parker series about a professional thief, starring Mark Wahlberg and LaKeith Standfield, directed by Shane Black for Amazon. The screenplay was co-written with Black and Anthony Bagarozzi.

== Career ==
Mondry became a professional writer when he broke into the entertainment industry with a million dollar spec sale. The screenplay, entitled "Tick Tock" (co-written with Anthony Bagarozzi) starred Jennifer Lopez and Samuel Jackson but was cancelled following the attacks on the World Trade Center on September 11, 2001. He is currently co-owner of Modern Pictures, with Anthony Bagarozzi and Randi Nguyen, which produces independently financed features.

Mondry has several projects in development. Sony Pictures, Doc Savage, a live-action movie adaptation to be directed by Shane Black and starring Dwayne Johnson, based on the pulp serial novels of the 1930s; Jekyll, a modern-day reimagining of the classic Jekyll and Hyde story, based on Steven Moffat's BBC mini-series and produced by Jeff Kleeman and Ellen DeGeneres for Summit Entertainment. The Cold Warrior, a project Netflix acquired from Universal Pictures in late 2017, which tells the story of a retired Cold War spy who teams up with a younger agent to stop a terrorist threat orchestrated by Russia.
