= White River Valley Museum =

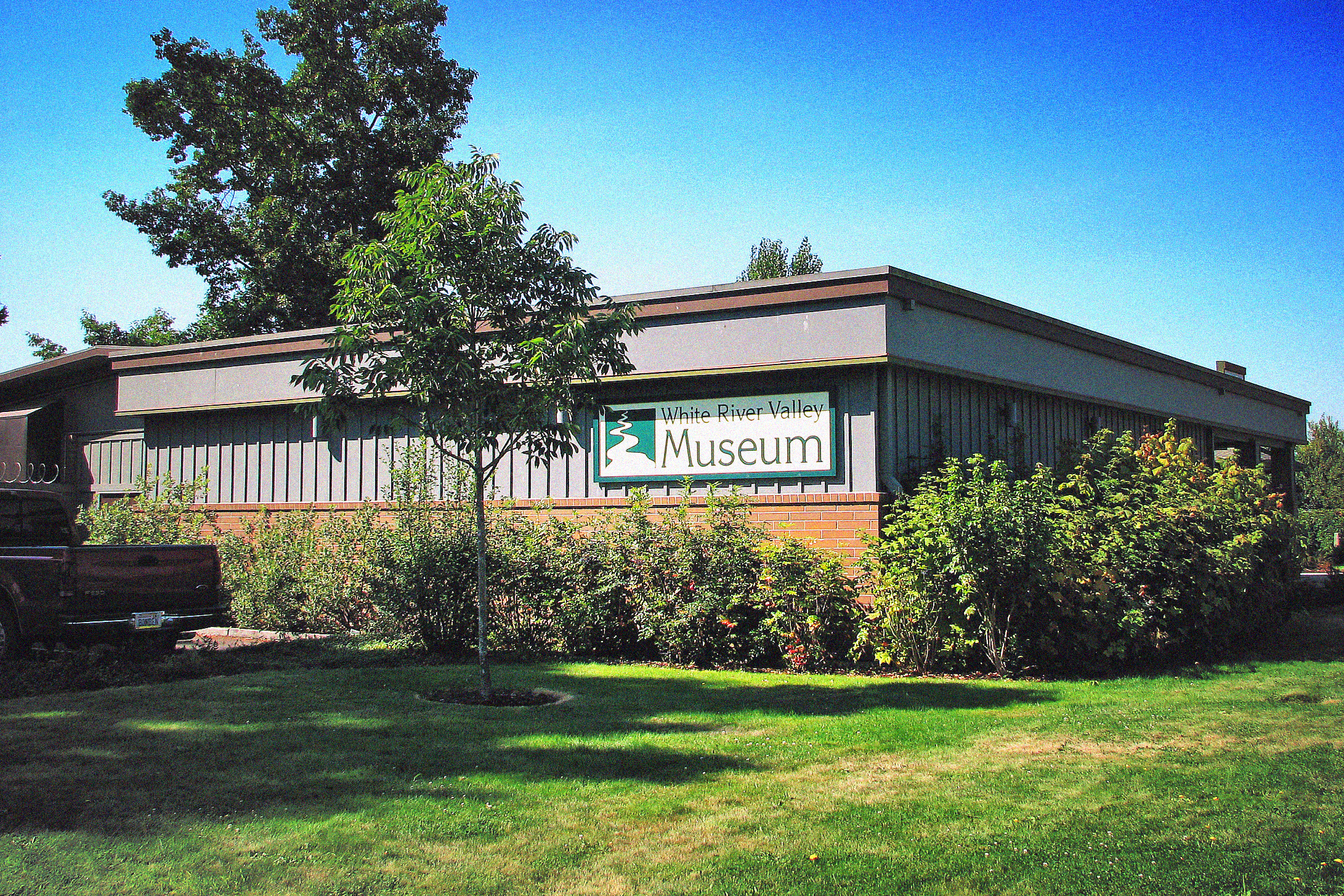
- Established: 1996
- Location: 918 H St SE, Auburn, Washington
- Coordinates: 47.2991°N 122.2184°W
- Type: History museum
- Website: www.wrvmuseum.org

White River Valley Museum is a historical museum located in Auburn, Washington.

== History ==
Created through the combined effort of the City of Auburn and the White River Valley Historical Society, the White River Valley Museum has been open to the public as far back as January 1996. Since then, the museum has published a monthly newsletter, "White River Journal", while working to preserve regional historical artifacts and sites, including the Mary Olsen Farm. In 2001, the White River Valley Museum applied for and received the Mary Olson Farm's placement onto the National Register of Historic Places.

== Mission ==
The White River Valley Museum's mission statement is: "The White River Valley Museum is a partnership with the city of Auburn and combines history and culture to create an exciting and educational experience for visitors."

== Exhibits ==
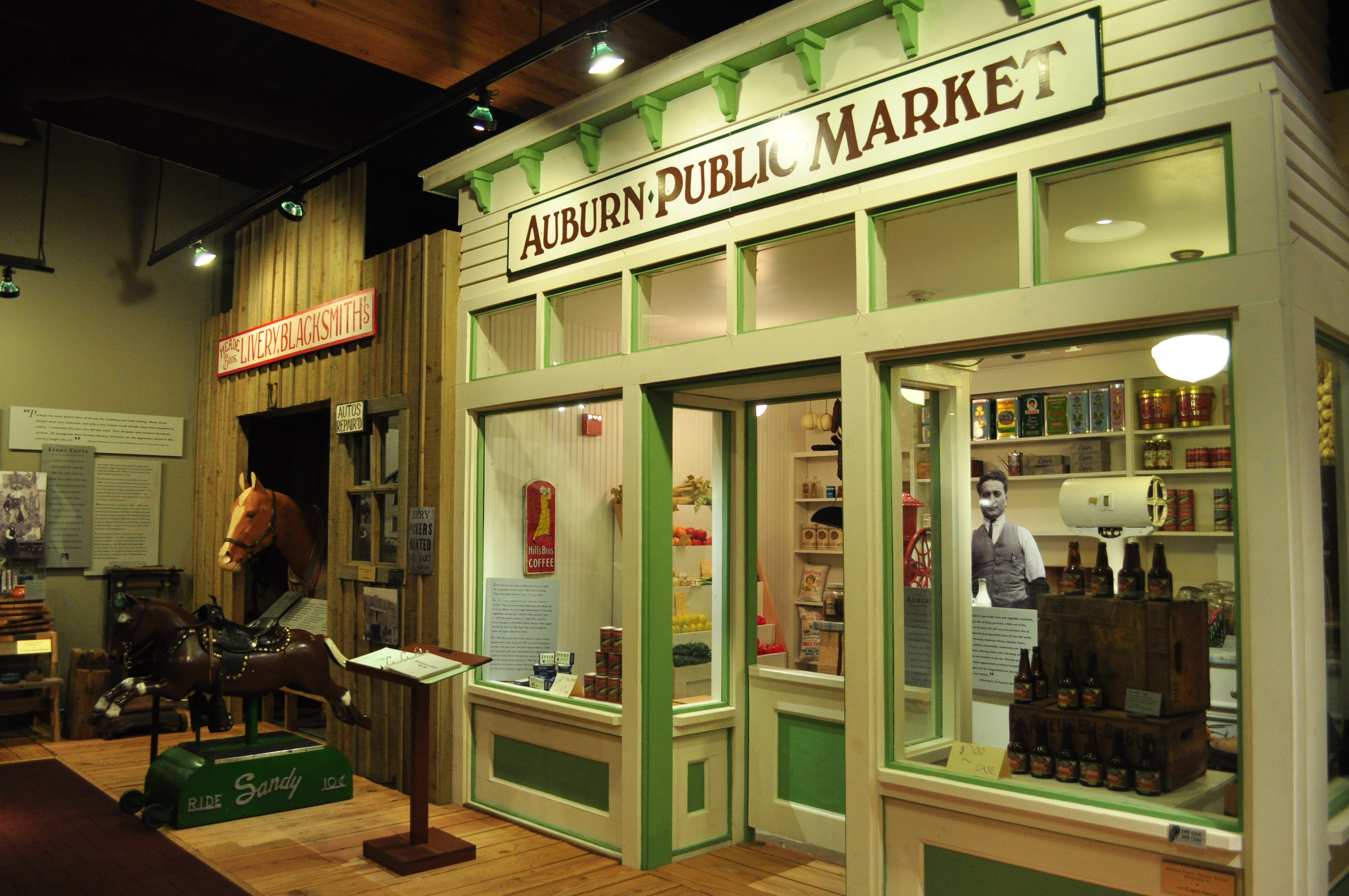
Replica turn-of-the-20th century grocery store

The White River Valley Museum has both permanent exhibits and four temporary exhibits per year. The museum's collections focus on local Puget Sound history, Northwest Indian culture, Japanese-Americans, and the Northern Pacific Railroad.

- 1924 Auburn Depot - visitors can view and experience the Northern Pacific Railroad depot and caboose.
- 1915 Japanese Farmhouse - teaches visitors about the Iseri Family of Thomas Washington, including picture brides, Buddhist home altars, and life on truck farms.
- Downtown Auburn in the 1920s - includes the Auburn Public Market and the Auburn Hat Shop with replica hats that museum visitors may handle.
- Muckleshoot Indian Tribe (the original settlers of the region) - includes a c 1890 river canoe display and a scale model of a winter house.
- Northern Clay Company, aka Gladding, McBean - illustrates the architectural terra cotta of Seattle and Tacoma, and the clay industry of the Green River Valley, the Auburn laborers, and Vienna designers.
- Tourist Hotel of 1924 - illustrates Auburn as a boom town in the 1920s and includes photos of the 1924 mayor Otto Bersch and a conductor for the Northern Pacific Railroad.

Examples of the museum's temporary exhibits include "On Track": a collection of railroad photographs of Warren McGee taken between the 1930s and 1970s, and a collection of Auburn "Our Story" Videos covering a variety of regional historical topics.

== Collections ==
The White River Valley Museum's collections include the historic site Mary Olson's Farm, as well as an archive of the monthly museum publication "White River Journal". The museum's photograph collection contains thousands of regional historic images dating between 1894 and 1982, while the museum's small research library holds books, diaries and regional newspapers from the same period. The museum also has an extensive collection of regional artifacts from both historic Auburn and its people, as well as objects from regional Native American tribes, including the Coast Salish including the Muckleshoot.
