= Doug Liman =

American film director and producer (born 1965)

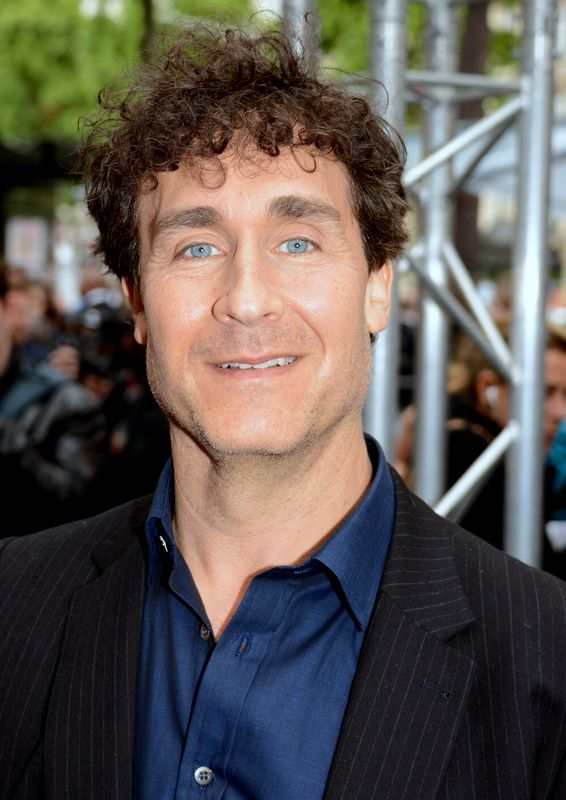
- Liman in 2014
- Born: Douglas Eric Liman; July 24, 1965 (age 61); New York City, U.S.
- Education: Brown University
- Occupations: Film director, producer
- Years active: 1994–present
- Father: Arthur L. Liman
- Relatives: Lewis J. Liman (brother)

Douglas Eric Liman (/ˈlaɪmən/; born July 24, 1965) is an American film director and producer. He is known for directing the films Swingers (1996), Go (1999), The Bourne Identity (2002), Mr. & Mrs. Smith (2005), Jumper (2008), Edge of Tomorrow (2014), American Made (2017), and Road House (2024).

Most of his career has been associated with the production company Hypnotic. He is co-owner with Dave Bartis, whom he met as an undergraduate at Brown University where they co-founded Brown Television (BTV) and the National Association of College Broadcasters (NACB).

Liman is on the advisory board of the Legal Action Center and the Arthur Liman Public Interest Program at Yale Law School.

== Early life ==
Liman, who is Jewish, was born in New York City, the son of Ellen (née Fogelson), a painter and writer, and Arthur L. Liman, a lawyer.

Liman began making short films while still in junior high school and studied at International Center of Photography in New York City. While attending Brown University, he helped to co-found the student-run cable television station BTV and served as its first station manager. He also co-founded the NACB, the first trade association geared to student-staffed radio and television stations, in 1988.

Liman attended the graduate program at University of Southern California, where he was tapped to helm his first project in 1993, the comedy film Getting In.

== Career ==
Liman's first major success was Swingers, released in 1996. The film, written by Jon Favreau and based on Favreau's life, is a comedy about struggling actors amid the L.A. club milieu. Liman raised the funding and the film was made on the cheap, starring Favreau and his friends (Vince Vaughn, Ron Livingston, and Patrick Van Horn), ultimately costing $250,000. The film was a critical success, and jump-started the careers of Liman and the featured actors. Liman sold the film to Miramax for $5.5 million.

Liman next directed Go (1999), which tracks the events of a drug deal gone wrong through three different points of view as plot lines diverge and reconverge; Liman was also the film's cinematographer. The film was a modest success, grossing $28.4 million worldwide against a $20 million budget, and garnered positive reviews from critics.

In 1999, Liman shot a commercial for Nike featuring Tiger Woods.

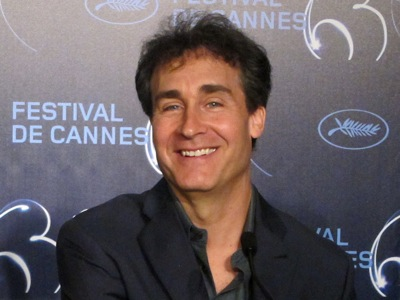
Liman at the Cannes Film Festival, May 2010

Liman next directed the 2002 action thriller The Bourne Identity starring Matt Damon, an adaptation of the 1980 Robert Ludlum novel. The film was a box office success, earning over $200 million, and began a Bourne film franchise that has since included four additional films. Liman directed only the first Bourne film, after a notoriously "chaotic" shoot disrupted his relationship with the studio. As he had personally acquired the rights to the franchise from Ludlum, he served as an executive producer for three of the four sequels (2004's The Bourne Supremacy, 2007's The Bourne Ultimatum and 2016's Jason Bourne).

Liman executive-produced and directed the first two episodes ("Premiere" and "The Model Home") of the successful Fox prime time drama The O.C. (2003–2007). Liman produced and directed a series of comedy shorts for the Chrysler Film Project and Cannes Film Festival entitled Indie Is Great.

Liman also directed Mr. & Mrs. Smith (2005), a romantic comedy about an increasingly distant married couple who come to fear their whole relationship was a lie after they discover they are both secretly assassins. The film was Liman's most commercially successful to date, and is well known for the off-screen romance that developed between stars Brad Pitt and Angelina Jolie while making the film.

In 2005, Liman signed on to direct the pilot episode of NBC's television series Heist, which is about a season-long attempt to rob three jewelry stores on Beverly Hills' swanky Rodeo Drive. Also that same year, the production company Hypnotic struck a deal with NBC Universal Television Studio. Shortly afterwards, he renamed the production company from Hypnotic to Dutch Oven.

His film adaptation of Steven Gould's science fiction novel Jumper was released in 2008.

In 2009, he co-founded the website 30ninjas.com which produces content using AI and XR technology.

Liman directed 2010's Fair Game, about the Plame affair, which competed for the Palme d'Or at the 2010 Cannes Film Festival.

In 2011, Liman directed and produced I Just Want My Pants Back, a television series that aired on MTV. He produced Covert Affairs and Suits, two original series on the USA Network. He directed the film adaptation of the Hiroshi Sakurazaka novel, All You Need is Kill, released as Edge of Tomorrow (2014), starring Tom Cruise. In 2017, he directed Aaron Taylor-Johnson and John Cena in the military thriller The Wall, and directed Cruise again, in the crime-action film American Made, a biopic of pilot Barry Seal.

In August 2016, having left the adaptation of Gambit, Liman signed on to direct Dark Universe, a film set within the DC Extended Universe and based on superhero team Justice League Dark. However, Liman departed from this project due to scheduling conflicts with the filmChaos Walking (2021), that Liman was working on that time.

In January 2020, Liman announced that the Edge of Tomorrow sequel, Live Die Repeat and Repeat, was currently in its early planning stages.

In May 2020, it was reported that Liman would be directing, writing, and producing a fictional movie shot in outer space. Tom Cruise was set to star and produce. According to reports, they would fly to space and to the International Space Station as part of the SpaceX Axiom Space-2 mission. As of 2022, no script had been finished and the film was described as "aspirational".

In November 2021, it was reported that Liman was in talks to direct a remake of the 1989 film Road House, with Jake Gyllenhaal starring. The film was officially greenlit on August 2, 2022, by Amazon Studios, with Liman and Gyllenhaal's involvement confirmed, and production began later that month in the Dominican Republic. He later condemned Amazon's decision to release the film straight to streaming instead of a theatrical release and said he would boycott its SXSW premiere as a result.

In December 2022, it was announced Liman would direct heist film The Instigators, starring Matt Damon and Casey Affleck, for Apple Studios, marking Liman's first film with Damon since The Bourne Identity. The film was released in select theatres on August 2, 2024, before premiering on Apple TV+ on August 9.

In January 2023, the 2023 Sundance Film Festival premiered Liman's documentary Justice, about sexual misconduct charges against 2018 Supreme Court nominee Brett Kavanaugh.

In May 2026, it was announced that Liman's upcoming satirical Bitcoin film will star Casey Affleck, Gal Gadot, Isla Fisher and Pete Davidson, playing versions of Jeff Bezos, Jack Dorsey, Mark Zuckerberg, Vladimir Putin, Kim Jong Un and Eric Trump.

== Filmography ==
=== Film ===
Director

| Year | Title | Director | Producer | DoP |
|---|---|---|---|---|
| 1994 | Getting In | Yes | No | No |
| 1996 | Swingers | Yes | No | Yes |
| 1999 | Go | Yes | No | Yes |
| 2002 | The Bourne Identity | Yes | Yes | No |
| 2005 | Mr. & Mrs. Smith | Yes | No | No |
| 2008 | Jumper | Yes | No | No |
| 2010 | Fair Game | Yes | Yes | Yes |
| 2014 | Edge of Tomorrow | Yes | Executive | No |
| 2017 | The Wall | Yes | No | No |
| 2017 | American Made | Yes | No | No |
| 2021 | Locked Down | Yes | Executive | No |
| 2021 | Chaos Walking | Yes | No | No |
| 2024 | Road House | Yes | No | No |
| 2024 | The Instigators | Yes | No | No |
| TBA | Bitcoin | Yes | No | No |
| TBA | Snake Island | Yes | TBA | |

Producer

- Mail Order Wife (2004)

Executive producer

- The Bourne Supremacy (2004)
- The Bourne Ultimatum (2007)
- The Killing Floor (2007)
- Jason Bourne (2016)
- The Phantom (2021)

=== Documentary film ===
- Reckoning with Torture (2016)
- Justice (2023) (Also executive producer)

=== Television ===
| Year(s) | Title | Director | Executive Producer | Notes |
|---|---|---|---|---|
| 2003–2004 | The O.C. | Yes | Yes | Episodes "Premiere" and "The Model Home" |
| 2006 | Heist | Yes | Yes | Episode "Pilot" |
| 2008–2009 | Knight Rider | No | Yes | |
| 2010–2014 | Covert Affairs | No | Yes | |
| 2011–2012 | I Just Want My Pants Back | Yes | Yes | Episodes "Pilot" and "The Blackout" |
| 2011–2019 | Suits | No | Yes | |
| 2016 | Captive | No | Yes | |
| 2018–2019 | Impulse | Yes | Yes | Episodes "Pilot" and "Mind on Fire" |
| 2019 | Pearson | No | Yes | |
| 2022 | The Recruit | Yes | Yes | Episodes "I.N.A.S.I.A.L." and "N.L.T.S.Y.P." |

TV movies

| Year(s) | Title | Director | Executive Producer |
|---|---|---|---|
| 2007 | Mr. & Mrs. Smith | Yes | Yes |
| 2008 | Knight Rider | No | Yes |

== Awards and nominations ==
| Year | Award | Nomination | Title | Result |
|---|---|---|---|---|
| 1996 | MTV Movie & TV Awards | Best New Filmmaker | Swingers | Won |
| 1999 | Independent Spirit Awards | Best Director | Go | Nominated |
| 2010 | Cannes Film Festival | Palme d'Or | Fair Game | Nominated |
| 2014 | Saturn Awards | Best Director | Edge of Tomorrow | Nominated |

== See also ==
- Doug Liman's unrealized projects
