= Road House (2024 film) =

American film by Doug Liman

- Promotional release poster
- Directed by: Doug Liman
- Screenplay by: Anthony Bagarozzi; Charles Mondry
- Story by: Anthony Bagarozzi; Charles Mondry; David Lee Henry
- Based on: Road House by: David Lee Henry; Hilary Henkin
- Produced by: Joel Silver
- Starring: Jake Gyllenhaal; Daniela Melchior; Billy Magnussen; Jessica Williams; Joaquim de Almeida; JD Pardo; Austin Post; Conor McGregor
- Cinematography: Henry Braham
- Edited by: Doc Crotzer
- Music by: Christophe Beck
- Production companies: Amazon MGM Studios; Silver Pictures
- Distributed by: Amazon MGM Studios (Note: Released through the Metro-Goldwyn-Mayer banner.)
- Release dates: March 8, 2024 (SXSW); March 21, 2024 (United States)
- Running time: 121 minutes
- Country: United States
- Language: English
- Budget: $85 million

Road House is a 2024 American action film directed by Doug Liman. It is a remake of the 1989 film and the third installment overall in the Road House franchise. It stars Jake Gyllenhaal as an ex-UFC fighter who takes a job as a bouncer at a Florida Keys roadhouse. The film also stars Daniela Melchior, Billy Magnussen, Jessica Williams, Joaquim de Almeida, JD Pardo, Austin Post, and Conor McGregor.

Road House premiered on March 8, 2024, at the opening night of the South by Southwest festival, and was released by Amazon MGM Studios via Prime Video on March 21, 2024. It received mixed reviews from critics. A sequel, Road House 2, is in production.

== Plot ==
Troubled former UFC middleweight fighter Elwood Dalton makes a living scamming gamblers on the underground fight circuit. He is approached by Frankie, the owner of an unruly roadhouse in the Florida Keys community of Glass Key, who offers him a job as head bouncer. Initially hesitant, Dalton takes up the offer after narrowly averting a suicide attempt with a freight train that destroys his car. He takes a bus to Glass Key and then walks to Frankie's establishment, called simply the Road House. On the way, he befriends Charlie, a teenager who runs a bookstore with her father, Stephen.

At the Road House, Dalton fends off a motorcycle gang working for local crime boss Ben Brandt and personally drives the injured thugs to the hospital, where he meets Ellie, a doctor who tends to his injuries. Staying in Frankie's disused houseboat, Dalton mentors the other bouncers and becomes popular with the locals. After an attempt on his life by gang leader Dell, Dalton finds him lying in wait at his houseboat with a shotgun. He throws Dell overboard but is unable to save him from being killed and eaten by a crocodile.

Knox, a psychopathic enforcer, is tasked by Brandt's incarcerated father to hunt down Dalton. After an unexpected date with Ellie, Dalton is confronted at gunpoint by the Monroe County sheriff, who tells him to leave town. However, Ellie, revealed to be the sheriff's daughter, intervenes. She explains that her father is in league with Brandt, who has inherited his wealthy father's drug empire. Brandt meets Dalton at the Road House and taunts him about his past: in a UFC title fight against a friend, Dalton was overcome with rage and killed his opponent in the cage. Knox arrives with Brandt's men, and an all-out bar fight ensues, leaving Dalton badly beaten.

Frankie admits that Brandt has been buying up property to build an expensive resort, but she is the lone holdout. Dalton decides to leave town but discovers that Charlie and Stephen are in the hospital after Brandt's men burned down their bookstore. Enraged, Dalton kills one of the thugs responsible and captures a sheriff's deputy making a large delivery of Brandt's illicit cash, framing the deputy for the murder and taking the money. The sheriff soon informs Dalton that Brandt has kidnapped Ellie and will exchange her for the money.

Stealing a bomb-laden motorboat to reach Brandt's catamaran yacht, Dalton finds him with the sheriff, who tells him the kidnapping was a lie to lure Dalton aboard. However, Brandt reveals that he is holding Ellie hostage. Tempers flare as Knox approaches in his boat, but Dalton detonates the motorboat and finds Ellie below deck, attempting to smash a window. Fleeing the sinking yacht, Brandt recaptures Ellie while Dalton commandeers Knox's boat. Catching up to Brandt, Dalton and Ellie leap off as Brandt is launched on top of the Road House.

Climbing up on a causeway, Knox carjacks a pickup truck and crashes into the Road House, leading to a brutal fistfight with Dalton. When Brandt orders him to kill Dalton, Knox snaps Brandt's neck instead. He prepares to finish off Dalton with a shard of wood, but Dalton gains the upper hand and repeatedly stabs Knox into submission. The sheriff arrives, agreeing to cover up for Dalton.

As Frankie and Stephen begin to rebuild, Charlie says goodbye to Dalton as he waits for his bus out of town. Stephen discovers Dalton has left them the trunk of cash as the bus pulls away. In a mid-credits scene, Knox has woken up. He assaults the hospital staff, before leaving in his gown.

== Cast ==
- Jake Gyllenhaal as Dalton
- Daniela Melchior as Ellie
- Conor McGregor as Knox
- Billy Magnussen as Ben Brandt
- Jessica Williams as Frankie
- B.K. Cannon as Laura
- Joaquim de Almeida as Sheriff
- Austin Post as Carter
- Lukas Gage as Billy
- Dominique Columbus as Reef
- Arturo Castro as Moe
- J. D. Pardo as Dell
- Beau Knapp as Vince
- Hannah Love Lanier as Charlie
- Kevin Carroll as Stephen
- Robert Menery as Jack
- Darren Barnet as Sam
- Travis Van Winkle as Dex
- Jay Hieron as Jax "Jetway" Harris

== Production ==
=== Development ===
In November 2013, Metro-Goldwyn-Mayer began development on the film with Rob Cohen directing and Michael Stokes writing. In September 2015, Cohen and Stokes had vacated the project while mixed martial arts (MMA) fighter Ronda Rousey was cast in the lead role with filming projected to begin sometime the following year. The next month, Nick Cassavetes boarded the film as writer and director. The project was then put on hold until November 2021, when MGM began another attempt, with Jake Gyllenhaal set to star and Doug Liman to direct. The studio prioritized the film despite Gyllenhaal and Liman's individual commitments to Guy Ritchie's The Covenant and Everest. A search for a new writer began to revise a previous draft by Anthony Bagarozzi and Chuck Mondry. By August 2022, Sheldon Turner had turned in a rewrite of the script. Ultimately, Bagarozzi and Mondry received final screenplay credit, with story credit given to the duo and the original's story writer David Lee Henry.

Early on, Amazon gave Gyllenhaal and the filmmakers a choice between a $60 million production budget and a theatrical release or an $85 million budget and have the film go straight to streaming, and they decided on the latter.

=== Casting ===
The project was officially greenlit in August 2022 by Amazon Studios, which had purchased MGM five months earlier. Daniela Melchior, Billy Magnussen, Conor McGregor, Gbemisola Ikumelo, Lukas Gage, Hannah Love Lanier, Travis Van Winkle, B.K. Cannon, Arturo Castro, Dominique Columbus, Beau Knapp and Bob Menery were added to the cast alongside Gyllenhaal. Joaquim de Almeida, Darren Barnet, Kevin Carroll and J. D. Pardo were added to the cast later in the month. In June 2023, Jessica Williams revealed she has a role in the film.

=== Filming ===
Filming began in the Dominican Republic on August 23, 2022. On March 3, 2023, Gyllenhaal shot a scene with former Ultimate Fighting Championship fighter Jay Hieron following the ceremonial weigh-ins for UFC 285 at MGM Grand Garden Arena in Las Vegas, Nevada. The scene was done in front of fans who attended the weigh-ins and included UFC president Dana White, play-by-play announcer Jon Anik and other regular UFC event personnel. A walkout scene with Gyllenhaal was filmed during an intermission in the event.

== Music ==
Volker Bertelmann was to compose the film's score, but in January 2024 it was announced that he had left the project, with Christophe Beck replacing him.

== Release ==
=== Streaming ===
Road House premiered at South by Southwest on March 8, 2024, as the opening night film, and was released in the United States via streaming on Prime Video by Amazon MGM Studios on March 21, 2024. It is the first film to be released as part of the centennial anniversary celebration of the founding of MGM, with a "100th anniversary" variant of its 2021 logo unveiled at the start of the film. The film got a special theatrical release at 17 cinemas operated by the Army & Air Force Exchange Service on March 16, 2024. Liman wrote an editorial piece in Deadline Hollywood criticizing Amazon for bypassing a wide theatrical release after they purchased MGM and announced a $1 billion investment to release 12–15 films a year theatrically. He wrote that he would not attend the film's premiere at SXSW in protest. Gyllenhaal responded by stating that while he sympathized with Liman's views, Amazon made it clear that it would have a streaming release for the film. Liman ultimately attended the SXSW premiere.

On February 27, 2024, hoping to block the film's release, R. Lance Hill, screenwriter of the original 1989 version, sued MGM and Amazon, claiming copyright infringement and accusing the studio of using AI-generated voices of the actors to complete the project during the 2023 SAG-AFTRA strike. MGM and Amazon launched a countersuit in May 2024.

== Reception ==
=== Critical response ===
On the review aggregator website Rotten Tomatoes, 59% of 207 critics' reviews are positive, with an average rating of 5.6/10. The website's consensus reads: "Road House updates a cult classic for a new generation, happily replicating the original's emphasis on cheesy brawn over narrative brains." Metacritic, which uses a weighted average, assigned the film a score of 57 out of 100, based on 46 critics, indicating "mixed or average" reviews.

Owen Gleiberman of Variety gave the film a positive review, writing "If the first Road House was a better Chuck Norris movie, the new one is something more uncanny—it's like a Jason Statham movie directed by Jonathan Demme". He also thought it could have been "a decisive hit" if it had been theatrically released. Christian Zilko of IndieWire gave it a B− grade, with praise for Gyllenhaal and McGregor's performances. He ended his review with, "All in all, this Road House is a fitting update to its predecessor's legacy. Not because it's better, or even because it's all that similar, but because it moves with the same unselfconscious stupidity that fueled so many of the '80s blockbusters we remember so fondly".

Chris Wasser of the Irish Independent gave the film two stars. He criticized the story, the performances of Jake Gyllenhaal and Conor McGregor, the direction of Doug Liman, and the fight sequences.

Brian Tallerico of RogerEbert.com gave the film a score of two out of four stars. He criticized the extensive use of CGI for fight sequences. He wrote "Punches and their reactions look like cut scenes in a video game far too often, especially a long bar brawl and a boat sequence in the end that have CGI so janky that I wonder if the reason that Prime didn't want this on a big screen was because people would be less likely to notice on a small screen". Rocco T. Thompson of Slant Magazine wrote that "any excitement evaporates as it becomes abundantly clear that the well-choreographed match-ups have been accentuated with unfortunate instances of CGI, undercutting the immersion of the action". He gave it a score of one and a half out of four. Kevin Maher of The Times awarded the movie two stars out of five, writing that “Jake Gyllenhaal is embarrassingly outshone by the mixed martial artist Conor McGregor in this pointless remake of the Eighties movie with Patrick Swayze.”

== Sequel ==
In March 2024, Gyllenhaal expressed interest in reprising his starring role and developing a sequel. By May of the same year, a sequel was officially announced to be in development with Gyllenhaal reprising the lead role. Amazon MGM Studio head Jennifer Salke stated that work on the project is ongoing. In April 2025, it was reported that Guy Ritchie was in talks to direct the sequel. He was confirmed to direct later that month, from a screenplay by Will Beall. In June 2025, Dave Bautista was reported to be offered a role. In July 2025, Ritchie left the film. Ilya Naishuller later entered talks to replace him. In August 2025, Leila George joined the cast.
