= Road House (1989 film) =

American action film by Rowdy Herrington

- Theatrical release poster
- Directed by: Rowdy Herrington
- Screenplay by: David Lee Henry; Hilary Henkin
- Story by: David Lee Henry
- Produced by: Joel Silver
- Starring: Patrick Swayze; Ben Gazzara; Kelly Lynch; Sam Elliott
- Cinematography: Dean Cundey
- Edited by: John F. Link; Frank J. Urioste
- Music by: Michael Kamen
- Production company: Silver Pictures
- Distributed by: United Artists
- Release date: May 19, 1989
- Running time: 114 minutes
- Country: United States
- Language: English
- Budget: $15 million
- Box office: $61.6 million

Road House is a 1989 American action film directed by Rowdy Herrington. Written by David Lee Henry and Hilary Henkin, it stars Patrick Swayze, Ben Gazzara, Kelly Lynch and Sam Elliott. The film follows professional bouncer James Dalton (Swayze), who is hired to clean up a violent roadside bar in the small town of Jasper, Missouri, where he becomes embroiled in a conflict with a ruthless local businessman and crime lord.

Road House was filmed primarily in California in 1988, primarily in Newhall, Valencia, and Canyon Country. Swayze performed many of his own stunts. The film's soundtrack featured performances by Jeff Healey and his band, with an original score composed by Michael Kamen.

Released by United Artists on May 19, 1989, Road House grossed $61.6 million worldwide against a $15 million budget. Critical reception was generally negative, with reviewers criticizing its violent content, although audience polling was more favorable. It was nominated for five Golden Raspberry Awards, with award founder John Wilson later naming Road House as one of the 100 most enjoyably bad movies ever made.

In the years following its release, Road House developed a cult reputation and became one of Swayze's most recognizable films. Its enduring popularity led to the creation of the Road House franchise, which includes an off-Broadway stage adaptation, the direct-to-video sequel Road House 2 (2006), and the remake Road House (2024).

== Plot ==
James Dalton is a professional bouncer working security for a club in New York City. Although stoic and cool-headed, Dalton is tormented by memories of a man he killed in self-defense by ripping out his throat. Frank Tilghman, a businessman, recruits Dalton to take over security at his club "Double Deuce" in Jasper, Missouri. Tilghman plans to invest substantial funds into the dilapidated club and needs Dalton's highly regarded skills to tackle the endemic violence and rough customers. Dalton agrees in exchange for full authority over the club's operations and immediately fires several employees for poor behavior, theft, and drug dealing. For privacy, Dalton stays in a sparse barn owned by a farmer named Emmett, unaware that the mansion on the adjacent lake belongs to Brad Wesley, a crime lord who controls the town through bribery, intimidation, and violence.

Wesley's nephew, Pat McGurn, one of the fired employees, tries to intimidate Tilghman into giving him his job back, but fails. Pat later attacks Dalton, who, with the help of his new bouncers, badly injures Pat and his accomplices. Receiving a knife wound in the process, Dalton visits a hospital, befriending Dr. Elizabeth Clay, to whom Wesley is also attracted. After sending his henchmen to unsuccessfully try to disrupt business at the Double Deuce, Wesley offers to hire Dalton himself. Dalton refuses, and Wesley uses his connections to prevent the Double Deuce from purchasing alcohol from any suppliers. Dalton uses his own connections to secure some supplies and reunites with his mentor Wade Garrett, an aging bouncer who arrives in town after a disconcerting phone call from Dalton. Wesley sends his men to destroy the Double Deuce's supplies, but Dalton and Garrett defeat them.

One evening, the auto shop next to the Double Deuce—owned by Elizabeth's uncle, Red Webster—is destroyed by arson. After Dalton and the crowd return inside the Double Deuce, they find Wesley awaiting them, who deploys his henchman, Jimmy Reno, to instigate a massive brawl with the Double Deuce bouncers. When Dalton intervenes, Wesley calls the fight to a stop and leaves the bar. Wesley continues tightening his grip on Jasper by sabotaging other businesses while the local owners discuss their futile efforts to stop him. Garrett and Elizabeth both attempt to calm Dalton, trying to assuage his guilt about killing in self-defense and his frustration at being unable to end Wesley's campaign. Tensions peak when Reno blows up Emmett's home. Although Emmett is saved, the enraged Dalton fights Reno, killing him in self-defense by ripping out his throat when Reno draws a gun, much to Elizabeth's shock and disgust.

Later, Wesley contacts Dalton and threatens to kill either Elizabeth or Garrett by coin toss: Heads for Elizabeth, Tails for Garrett. A badly beaten Garrett arrives at the Double Deuce, while Dalton leaves to check on Elizabeth, who is safe but unwilling to leave with him. Dalton returns to the bar and finds Garrett slumped over the bar. Assuming he's drunk, Dalton attempts to wake him before turning him over and discovering he's been stabbed to death, with a note pinned to the knife reading "It was Tails". Distraught, Dalton storms Wesley's estate, kills most of his henchmen, and defeats Wesley, but refrains from killing Wesley himself. Elizabeth arrives and reconciles with Dalton, but Wesley recovers and attempts to shoot him before being shot dead by the locals, including Emmett and Red. The police arrive, but everyone present claims they saw nothing.

Sometime later, the modernized and refined Double Deuce bustles with customers while Dalton and Elizabeth swim together in a lake.

== Cast ==
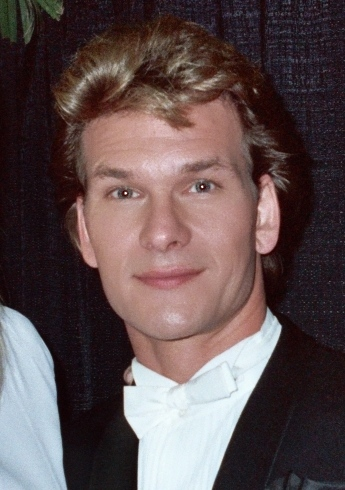
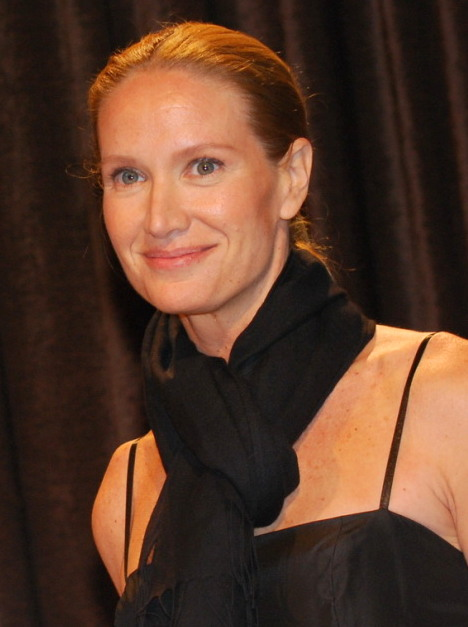
Patrick Swayze (pictured in 1990) and Kelly Lynch (2007)
- Patrick Swayze as Dalton
- Kelly Lynch as Dr. Elizabeth "Doc" Clay
- Sam Elliott as Wade Garrett
- Ben Gazzara as Brad Wesley
- Kevin Tighe as Frank Tilghman
- Red West as Red Webster
- Jeff Healey as Phil Cody
- Sunshine Parker as Emmett
- Jon Paul Jones as Pete Stroudenmire
- Marshall Teague as Jimmy Reno
- John Doe as Pat McGurn
- Kathleen Wilhoite as Carrie Ann
- Terry Funk as Morgan
- Gary Hudson as Steve
- Anthony De Longis as Gary Ketchum
- Travis McKenna as Jack
- Keith David as Ernie Bass
- John William Young as Tinker
- Julie Michaels as Denise
- Michael Rider as O'Connor

== Production ==
=== Casting ===
Annette Bening was originally cast as Dr. Elizabeth Clay. However, since she had little chemistry with Patrick Swayze, she was replaced by Kelly Lynch. Scott Glenn turned down the role of Jimmy Reno, which eventually went to Marshall Teague. Joel Silver cast Sam Elliott as Wade Garrett due to his "baggage".

=== Filming ===
Filming started in April 1988 on location throughout California, primarily in Newhall, Valencia, and Canyon Country. The filming of much of the New Double Deuce used Anaheim's Cowboy Boogie, also later called the Bandstand among other names until it closed. The opening and monster truck scenes were filmed in Reedley, California. The Kings River runs between the two residences. The monster truck used was Bigfoot #7, which was originally built for the film. The scene cost $500,000 to film. While filming the famous fistfight scene, Teague broke Swayze's ribs.

== Music ==
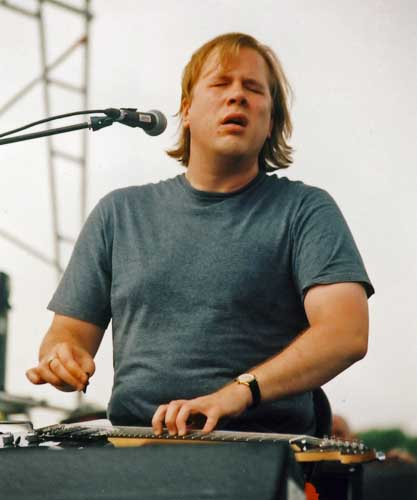
Jeff Healey, seen here performing in 2002, whose band is featured in the film as the house band for the Double Deuce.

The soundtrack for Road House features Canadian guitarist Jeff Healey, whose band is featured in the film as the house band for the Double Deuce. Cruzados are the band in the opening credits, contributing three songs to the film that never made the soundtrack. Patrick Swayze also wrote one song and sang two for the soundtrack. The film's score was composed by Michael Kamen. A limited edition 14-track score album was issued by Intrada Records in 2012. An expanded limited 31-track score was reissued for the film's 30th anniversary by La-La Land Records in 2019.

== Release ==
=== Theatrical ===
The film premiered in New York City and Los Angeles on May 19, 1989.

=== Home media ===
Between VHS, DVD, Blu-ray and streaming service sales, Road House has grossed over $203 million, including its original box office of $61 million. The film was originally released on VHS and then on DVD. In the United States Metro-Goldwyn-Mayer first released the film on DVD on February 4, 2003, with a 2.35:1 aspect ratio and theatrical trailer as the sole extra feature.

In 2006 a Deluxe Edition DVD was released with two audio commentaries including one with the director, two featurettes titled On the Roadhouse and What Would Dalton Do?. Road House was first issued by MGM Home Entertainment on Blu-ray disc on June 2, 2009. A second disc combines the same six special features ported from the Deluxe DVD.

After being reissued numerous times in the U.S., in 2016 Shout! Factory released a 2-disc Blu-ray collectors edition with fourteen extra features with material ported over from the previous editions. New supplements include a behind the scenes documentary with new interviews by Rowdy Herrington, actors Kelly Lynch, John Doe, Kevin Tighe, Julie Michaels and Red West, a separate conversation with Herrington and a featurette for the film's music. The magnet clasp boxed limited edition 4K Ultra HD Blu-ray/Blu-ray combo pack from Vinegar Syndrome was released on November 25, 2022.

== Reception ==
=== Box office ===
Road House grossed $30 million in the United States and Canada and $31 million internationally for a worldwide total of $61 million. It has also found life on cable television.

=== Critical response ===
Upon its release Road House received mostly negative reviews from critics, while audiences polled by CinemaScore gave the film an average grade of B on an A+ to F scale. Roger Ebert of the Chicago Sun-Times gave the film two-and-a-half stars out of four and commented, "Road House exists right on the edge between the 'good-bad movie' and the merely bad. I hesitate to recommend it, because so much depends on the ironic vision of the viewer. This is not a good movie. But viewed in the right frame of mind, it is not a boring one, either." Gene Siskel of the Chicago Tribune was less complimentary, calling it "outrageous in terms of its cartoon-like plotting and dialogue" and lamenting "Swayze's mindless posturing. A young star has sold himself to become a pinup boy."

In The Washington Post, Hal Hinson's scathing review dismissed the film as "Full of gratuitous mayhem, head-bashing, gay-bashing and woman-bashing, Road House has a malicious, almost putrid tone." Caryn James of The New York Times was similarly critical, saying "Road House is much funnier than most comedies, until it turns vile instead of just stupid." She also said the film made Swayze's career "look like a bad joke" and sent it "spinning out of control". Sheila Benson of the Los Angeles Times compared Road House unfavorably to Swayze's recent hit Dirty Dancing, "It wasn't sex that Dirty Dancing delivered, it was romance. But in deep Road House country, . . . the undefined made crassly visible, there isn't a whiff of romance anywhere, any more than there's a single jot of common sense."

On Rotten Tomatoes, Road House has a rating of 44% based on 50 reviews, with an average rating of 5.40/10. The consensus states: "Whether Road House is simply bad or so bad it's good depends largely on the audience's fondness for Swayze -- and tolerance for violently cheesy action." Metacritic, which uses a weighted average, assigned the film a score of 36 out of 100, based on 16 critics, indicating "generally unfavorable" reviews.

=== Accolades ===
At the 10th Golden Raspberry Awards, Road House was nominated for (but did not "win") five Golden Raspberry Awards: Worst Picture, Worst Actor (Patrick Swayze for this film and Next of Kin), Worst Supporting Actor (Ben Gazzara), Worst Director and Worst Screenplay. The film is listed in Golden Raspberry Award founder John Wilson's book The Official Razzie Movie Guide as one of The 100 Most Enjoyably Bad Movies Ever Made.

== Franchise ==
=== Sequel ===
A sequel, Road House 2, was released directly to DVD in July 2006. Set many years later and telling the story of Dalton's adult son Shane Tanner (Johnathon Schaech), it featured no characters from the original cast and only a few references to Dalton (who was reportedly shot dead before the film took place). The sequel confirmed that Dalton's first name was James, which could be seen momentarily on the medical chart in the original film's hospital scene, but which had been otherwise left unsaid. At the same time Road House 2 was released, the original film was reissued in a deluxe edition featuring, among other features, separate audio commentary tracks by director Herrington, Kevin Smith and Scott Mosier, which the duo had expressed an interest in doing during the introduction of the tenth anniversary Clerks DVD.

In 2003, an off-Broadway musical production of Road House was staged as a campy comedy by Timothy Haskell, as seen by its full title of Road House: The Stage Version Of The Cinema Classic That Starred Patrick Swayze, Except This One Stars Taimak From The 80's Cult Classic "The Last Dragon" Wearing A Blonde Mullet Wig.

Road House proved to be enough of an obsession for Crow T. Robot (Trace Beaulieu) from Mystery Science Theater 3000 in episode 321 to inspire a special board game based on the movie as his misfit toy for the new Island of Misfit Toys in the Invention Exchange and later a new Christmas carol, "Let's have a Patrick Swayze Christmas", as well as countless comparisons of the movie to the movie he, Joel Robinson (Joel Hodgson) and Tom Servo (Kevin Murphy) were riffing (Santa Claus Conquers the Martians), all the way to changing some lyrics of the theme song in its closing reprise: "S-A-N-T-A C-L-A-U-S/Hooray for Patrick Swayze".

In the Family Guy season 8 episode "Brian's Got a Brand New Bag", Peter Griffin (Seth MacFarlane) purchases a DVD copy of Road House for a dollar at a closing video store. After watching the film, he decides that the only way to solve every problem is by roundhouse kicking everything in sight including his family. The episode was dedicated in memory of Swayze, who died of pancreatic cancer on September 14, 2009.

Following the death of Eric Garner, the New York City Police Department began using a scene from Road House as part of a mandatory, three-day retraining course for 22,000 officers expected to "be nice" under pressure.

In Young Sheldon season 4, episode 2, "A Docent, A Little Lady And A Bouncer Named Dalton" from November 2020, it is discovered that Mary Cooper (Zoe Perry)'s secret pleasure is watching action movies like Road House, which creates an unexpected bond with her teenager son Georgie (Montana Jordan).

=== Remake ===
In September 2015, it was announced that Ronda Rousey would star in a remake of Road House. A month later, Nick Cassavetes was announced to write and direct the film. However, plans for the film fell through and the remake was quietly canceled in 2016.

In November 2021, it was reported that Jake Gyllenhaal was in talks to star in a remake of Road House by Metro-Goldwyn-Mayer with Doug Liman directing. In August 2022, a full cast was announced, and principal photography commenced. The film was released worldwide on Amazon Prime Video on March 21, 2024, following its premiere at South by Southwest.
