= Three Kings (1999 film) =

1999 film by David O. Russell

- Theatrical release poster
- Directed by: David O. Russell
- Screenplay by: David O. Russell
- Story by: John Ridley
- Produced by: Charles Roven; Paul Junger Witt; Edward L. McDonnell
- Starring: George Clooney; Mark Wahlberg; Ice Cube; Spike Jonze; Nora Dunn; Jamie Kennedy; Mykelti Williamson; Cliff Curtis; Saïd Taghmaoui
- Cinematography: Newton Thomas Sigel
- Edited by: Robert K. Lambert
- Music by: Carter Burwell
- Production companies: Village Roadshow Pictures; Village-A.M. Film Partnership; Coast Ridge Films; Atlas Entertainment
- Distributed by: Warner Bros. (Worldwide); Roadshow Films (Australia & New Zealand)
- Release dates: October 1, 1999 (United States); January 13, 2000 (Australia)
- Running time: 115 minutes
- Countries: United States; Australia
- Language: English
- Budget: $48 million
- Box office: $107.7 million

Three Kings is a 1999 black comedy war film written and directed by David O. Russell from a story by John Ridley. It stars George Clooney, Mark Wahlberg, Ice Cube, and Spike Jonze as four American soldiers on a gold heist that takes place during the 1991 uprisings in Iraq against Saddam Hussein following the end of the First Gulf War.

Three Kings was released on October 1, 1999, in the United States and on January 13, 2000 in Australia. Warner Bros. distributed the film worldwide, while Roadshow Films distributed the film in Australia and New Zealand. The film received critical acclaim and grossed $107.7 million against a $48 million budget.

== Plot ==
Following the end of the Gulf War, U.S. soldiers remaining in theatre are bored from the lack of action and throw parties at night. Major Archie Gates, a U.S. Army Special Forces soldier, is trading sex for stories with a journalist, Cathy Daitch, when he is interrupted by Adriana Cruz, the television reporter he is assigned to escort.

While disarming and searching an Iraqi officer, U.S. Army Reserve Sergeant First Class Troy Barlow, his best friend Private First Class Conrad Vig, and their unit find a map in the officer's anus. Troy asks Staff Sergeant Chief Elgin to help interpret the document. Major Gates identifies it as a map of bunkers near Karbala containing gold bullion stolen from Kuwait. They decide to steal it, and Gates distracts Adriana by assigning Specialist Walter Wogeman to take her to investigate a false news tip.

They find the gold among other Kuwaiti plunder, and stumble on the interrogation of Amir Abdullah, whose wife pleads with them not to abandon the anti-Saddam dissidents. She is executed by the Iraqi Republican Guard and the group decides to free the Iraqi prisoners, triggering a firefight. They withdraw as Iraqi reinforcements arrive. Trying to evade a CS gas attack, they blunder into a minefield and get separated. Iraqi soldiers capture Troy while the others are rescued by a group of rebels who take them to their underground hideout. Conrad, Chief, and Archie agree to help the rebels and their families reach the Iranian border after they rescue Troy. Confined in the bunker in a room full of Kuwaiti cell phones, Troy calls his wife on a MicroTAC and tells her to report his location to his local Army Reserve unit. The call is cut short when he is dragged to an interrogation by Iraqi Captain Saïd.

The Americans and the rebels persuade a band of Iraqi Army deserters to sell them looted Kuwaiti luxury cars, then outfit them to resemble Saddam's entourage. The phony convoy scares away the bunker's defenders and Troy is freed. Saïd is spared, and they find more Shi'ite dissidents held in a dungeon. Iraqi soldiers return before they can depart, and in the ensuing firefight they kill Conrad and wound Troy with a punctured lung. Archie radios Walter and Adriana to arrange transport for the dissidents while hapless American officers in the camp try to locate the trio after the message from Troy's wife arrives. Every rebel is given a bar of gold, and the Americans bury the rest before the convoy arrives.

The convoy carries the dissidents to the Iranian border, where the three Americans intend to escort the rebels across to protect them from the Iraqi border guards. American officers intervene and arrest the trio while the rebels are recaptured. Archie offers the buried gold to the American officers in exchange for letting the refugees through. The commanding officer agrees to assisting the rebels get into Iran, but insists the charges of being absent without leave and disobeying orders will result in a courts-martial of Archie, Troy, and Chief.

The epilogue reveals the three surviving soldiers were cleared of the charges and honorably discharged because of Adriana's reporting. Archie becomes a military adviser for Hollywood action films, Chief leaves his airport job to work with Archie, and Troy returns to his wife and baby to run his own carpet store. The stolen gold is returned to Kuwait, who claim a small amount is still missing.

== Cast ==
- George Clooney as Major Archie Gates
  A career U.S. Army Special Forces officer close to retirement, who is disillusioned with the war.
- Mark Wahlberg as Sergeant First Class Troy Barlow
  An office worker with a wife and baby daughter at home. He wears the U.S. Army Civil Affairs and Psychological Operations patch and identifies himself as a Civil Affairs Reservist.
- Ice Cube as Staff Sergeant Chief Elgin
  An airline baggage handler from Detroit who believes he is protected by a ring of "Jesus-fire", also wears the U.S. Army Civil Affairs and Psychological Operations patch.
- Spike Jonze as Private First Class Conrad Vig
  A jobless, semi-literate soldier from a group home in Dallas who idolizes Troy; also wears the U.S. Army Civil Affairs and Psychological Operations patch.
- Nora Dunn as Adriana Cruz
  A tough cable news correspondent who is determined to get a good story.
- Jamie Kennedy as Specialist Walter Wogeman
  A bumbling soldier whom Archie uses to distract Adriana.
- Mykelti Williamson as Colonel Ron Horn
  Archie's superior officer, who discovers the plan to steal the gold.
- Cliff Curtis as Amir Abdullah
  A Shi'ite Iraqi rebel who has been captured by Saddam's troops. Educated in the U.S. at Bowling Green State University, he was an entrepreneur in Baghdad, running several cafes before they were destroyed by Coalition bombs.
- Saïd Taghmaoui as Captain Saïd
  An Iraqi interrogator who tortures Barlow with electric shocks after he is captured.
- Judy Greer as Cathy Daitch
  A journalist competing with Adriana who has sex with Archie early in the film.
- Liz Stauber as Debbie Barlow, Troy's wife
- Holt McCallany as Captain Doug Van Meter
  Troy's superior officer, an obstreperous stickler for the rules.
- Alia Shawkat as Amir's daughter.
- Jim Gaffigan as Cuts Troy's cuff soldier
- Fahim Fazli as Refugee

== Production ==
Three Kings was filmed in the deserts of Casa Grande, Arizona, California and Mexico, with many of the extras played by actual Iraqi refugees. According to David O. Russell, two of the cast members had "personally defaced 300 murals of Saddam." After one of the military advisers to the film died during production, Russell said the death was "perhaps due to chemicals he was exposed to in the Gulf."

=== Script controversy ===
Former stand-up comic John Ridley had originally written the screenplay, then titled Spoils of War, as an experiment to see how fast he could write and sell a film. The writing took him seven days, and Warner Bros. bought the script 18 days later in 1995, for Witt-Thomas Films, a unit of Witt-Thomas Productions. The film was initially set to be produced by Paul Junger Witt, Tony Thomas and Edward McDonnell, until Thomas was replaced in the position by Charles Roven, whose Atlas Entertainment production company had a deal with Warner Bros., itself inherited from a pre-existing deal with Turner Pictures, and was producing Fallen and City of Angels, and had the title changed from Spoils of War to Three Kings. When the studio showed a list of their purchased scripts to Russell, the one-sentence description of Spoils of War, "heist set in the Gulf War", appealed to him. Although Russell claimed he never read Ridley's script, so as not "to pollute my own idea", he admits that "John gets credit where it's due. The germ of the idea that I took was his." Ridley maintains that Russell shut him out of the process, saying: "I never heard a word while he was shooting the movie. Never saw any of the script changes. And then finally, a year later, I get a copy of the script, and my name isn't even on it." Although Warner Bros. worked out a deal to give Ridley a "story by" credit, Ridley remains unhappy with the experience, and has blocked Russell's efforts to publish the Three Kings screenplay in book form.

=== Casting ===
Russell penned the script with several actors in mind. Although Spike Jonze had never acted in a film before, Russell wrote the part of Conrad Vig specifically for him, and the two practised Conrad's Southern accent over the phone while Jonze directed his first feature film, Being John Malkovich. Although Russell had to convince a wary Warner Bros. to cast an inexperienced actor in such a large role, he eventually won out. Russell said Jonze's lack of previous acting work was beneficial to the film, citing the "chaos that a nonactor brings to the set...he really shakes things up."

Co-star George Clooney also expressed initial reservations about the choice of Jonze. "It's always worrisome when somebody says, 'I got a friend,' and you've never heard of them. But within five minutes of meeting Spike, you just go, 'Oh, he's perfect for the part.'"

The part of Archie Gates was originally planned for Clint Eastwood, but Russell decided to rewrite it as a younger character. George Clooney eventually saw a copy of the script and was "blown away" by it. When he heard the part was being re-written, he jumped at the chance to get involved. At this point in Clooney's career, he was best known for his role as the handsome Dr. Doug Ross on the popular television drama ER. Clooney was ready to pursue a role in film. Unfortunately, Russell seemed unwilling to cast Clooney in the role. Persistent, Clooney sent a humorously self-deprecating letter signed "George Clooney, TV actor" to Russell asking for the part, and showed up at Russell's New York City apartment to plead his case. Russell still wasn't satisfied that Clooney could portray the character. He instead convinced Nicolas Cage to play the role. However, when Cage became unavailable after being cast in Martin Scorsese's Bringing Out the Dead, Russell gave the part to Clooney. Russell later stated that Clooney "was meant to play the part."

Many of the Iraqi roles were played by actual Iraqi refugees in the United States.

=== Film techniques ===
Much to the chagrin of Warner Bros., Russell decided to use a number of experimental cinematic techniques in the film. Handheld cameras and Steadicam shots were used to give the film a journalistic feel. Russell shot a majority of the film on Ektachrome transparency stock that was cross-processed in colour negative chemicals, to reproduce "the odd colour of the newspaper images [of the Gulf War]." Though the process produced a unique quality and look to the film, it was exceedingly unreliable to develop, and many film labs would not provide insurance for the transparency stock if it did not develop properly. Russell feared that the scenes would need to be reshot until finally a lab was found that would develop the transparency stock in the negative chemicals. The opening was shot on conventional negative stock and bleach bypassed to give a deep black and high contrast look. Some interior shots were also filmed on conventional negative stock and processed normally. Russell also credited the realism of the firefights to the film's cinematographer, Newton Thomas Sigel, who had shot several documentaries on South American civil wars, saying "he knew what it was like to be in that kind of world."

All of the explosions in the movie were filmed in one shot, as opposed to a typical film where each would have been covered by multiple cameras. Russell explained, "to me that's more real. The car's blowing up on this guy, and we just park the camera. Of course the producer says, 'we gotta run three cameras!' But if I cut three ways, then it just looks like an action picture." Russell also had the sound post-production team tone down the sounds of gunfire, saying he didn't want to "Bruce Willis-ize" the film." One frequently noted shot in the film is an image of a bullet piercing a number of internal organs, releasing bile into the abdominal cavity, used when Gates is describing sepsis as the effect of a gunshot wound. This internal camera is again used when SFC Barlow is shot in the torso and his chest begins to fill with air, crushing his lung. Both of these scenes were inspired by Russell asking an emergency room doctor friend "What's the weirdest wound you've ever seen?" It also erupted a minor controversy, when Russell began to joke around that the gunshots were fired into a real corpse; a statement everyone vehemently denied later.

=== Conflicts ===
The film's production process was particularly difficult for Russell, who was taking a variety of risks with what was a $42 million studio film. At the time it was made, Warner Bros. had not financed an auteur film in many years, and executives were hesitant to put such money in the hands of filmmakers who were used to working independently. The film's political overtones also worried the studio, especially with conflict still occurring in the Middle East. As a result, Warner Bros. gave Russell a number of limitations. The shooting schedule was reduced to only 68 days instead of the 80 Russell had initially asked for. The studio wanted the budget lowered to $35 million. Executives were also asking for the removal of more violent scenes, such as the exploding cow and the shooting of an Iraqi woman. Russell was also forced to sign a legal document requiring that scenes containing pedophilia accusations against Michael Jackson be removed from the film.

The shoot took place in Arizona during October. The crew were unused to the improvisational, on-the-fly directing style that Russell implemented. Rather than preparing organized shot lists, Russell preferred to use ideas as they came to him, often asking for longer hours. Early on, some of the crew began to feel a dislike for these methods and Russell along with them. Clooney noted that "there's an element of David that was in way over his head... he was vulnerable and selfish, and it would manifest itself in a lot of yelling." When Russell's frustration led to outbursts, Clooney took it upon himself to defend crew members and extras, leading to increased tensions. When an extra had an epileptic seizure on set, Clooney ran to his aid while Russell apparently remained indifferent. Afterward, Clooney criticized Russell for ignoring the incident, though Russell later stated that he was busy setting up a shot some yards away from the extra and was not aware that the extra had suffered a seizure. Another on-set conflict between the two arose while shooting footage on a Humvee with a camera mounted to it. Clooney recalls Russell yelling at the driver to drive faster. Clooney then approached the director, telling him to "knock it off". Russell remembers the incident differently: "The camera broke, we were losing the day and I was upset about that. So I jumped off the truck and I was like, 'Fuck!' I was just kicking the dirt and everything like that. And then George had this big thing about defending the driver, whom I hadn't really said anything to." During the shoot, Clooney was exhausted as he was still shooting ER in Los Angeles three days a week, while working on Three Kings the other four.

Clooney was determined to stay with the role and remained loyal to the script. He helped convince executives to support certain aspects of the film (such as the exploding cow scene) even after he was urged to drop out of production, as his contract called for his compensation with or without his decision to stay in the film. After a number of arguments, Clooney wrote Russell a letter that criticized Russell's behavior in a last attempt to make peace between the two, days before another fight broke out during the filming of the movie's finale. In it, the three lead characters attempt to escort Iraqi rebels across the border to Iran. There were a number of actors and extras in the scene, as well as other elements such as helicopters flying overhead and landing in the center of the location. The fight began after an extra was having difficulty throwing Ice Cube's character to the ground. After a number of takes, Russell came to the extra and put him through the motions of the action. Some individuals present on the set during the incident state that Russell was simply showing the extra how to convincingly act in the scene. However, Clooney and others thought that Russell had violently thrown the extra to the ground. Clooney recalls: "We were trying to get a shot and then he went berserk. He went nuts on an extra." Clooney approached Russell and began criticizing him again, coming to the extra's defense. The two began shouting at one another before getting into a physical fight. Second assistant director Paul Bernard was so fed up that he put down his camera and walked off the set, effectively quitting. Clooney concludes: "Will I work with David ever again? Absolutely not. Never. Do I think he's tremendously talented and do I think he should be nominated for Oscars? Yeah." Russell offered a different view, saying: "We're both passionate guys who are the two biggest authorities on the set," and maintained that the two continue to be friends. Ice Cube felt the conflict helped the film, saying, "It kind of kicked the set into a different gear where everybody was focused and we finished strong. I wouldn't mind if the director and the star got into an argument on all of my movies."

Though the fight was initially kept under wraps, both Russell and Clooney eventually gave official statements saying that the argument had blown over and neither harbored any ill will towards the other. Clooney continued to describe the event in later interviews, as well as in the cover story of the October 2003 issue of Vanity Fair, in which he states: "I would not stand for him humiliating and yelling and screaming at crew members, who weren't allowed to defend themselves. I don't believe in it and it makes me crazy. So my job was then to humiliate the people who were doing the humiliating." Executive producer and production manager Gregory Goodman later stated of Clooney's comments in the media, "It doesn't reflect well on [Clooney]. It's like some stupid sandbox quarrel." In early 2012, Clooney indicated that he and Russell had mended their relationship, saying, "We made a really, really great film, and we had a really rough time together, but it's a case of both of us getting older. I really do appreciate the work he continues to do, and I think he appreciates what I'm trying to do." However, in a 2024 interview, Clooney ruled out working with Russell again.

== Release ==
The film was released in the United States and Canada on October 1, 1999, on 2,942 screens.

=== Planned re-release ===
In 2004, Warner Bros., feeling the film had become relevant again due to the Iraq War, decided to re-release it in theaters and on DVD. Having no additional footage to add, Russell instead shot Soldiers Pay, a short documentary about the Iraq War, to accompany the film. Taking its name from William Faulkner's first novel of the same name about an airman's return home in World War I's aftermath, Russell said the documentary examined "both sides of the war, people who feel good about the war, who believe in the mission, people who feel bad."

While making the documentary, Russell spoke with both Iraqis and U.S. troops. Asked how the Iraqis he had interviewed felt about the war, Russell said:

Every Iraqi I know is glad that Saddam is gone. I would completely disagree with Michael Moore about that. I think it's good that Saddam is gone. And I think basically the movie takes the position of, is Iraq better off without Saddam? Yes. Is the world better off with this war? Not sure, don't think so.

Although Russell had planned to release the film before November 2004, hoping to "perhaps make a difference before the election", Warner Bros. abandoned the project at the last minute, citing "controversy surrounding the documentary, combined with a later-than-expected arrival of the bonus footage". Russell disputed the time-crunch excuse, saying: "I think if they really wanted to, they could make it happen." Eventually, the documentary was purchased by the Independent Film Channel, where it was aired in its entirety the night before the 2004 U.S. presidential election.

== Reception ==
=== Box office ===
The film opened at number two at the United States box office for the weekend with a gross of $15,847,636, behind Double Jeopardy's second weekend gross of $17 million. Exit polls suggested the film played to an older audience than anticipated. The film grossed $60,652,036 in the United States and Canada and $47.1 million internationally, for a worldwide total of $107.8 million.

=== Critical reception ===
Three Kings received critical acclaim. On Rotten Tomatoes, the film holds a 94% rating, based on 128 reviews, with an average rating of 7.8/10. The site's critical consensus reads: "Three Kings successfully blends elements of action, drama, and comedy into a thoughtful, exciting movie on the Gulf War." Metacritic, which uses a weighted average, assigned the film a score of 82 out of 100, based on 34 critics, indicating "universal acclaim". Audiences surveyed by CinemaScore gave the film a grade B on scale of A to F.

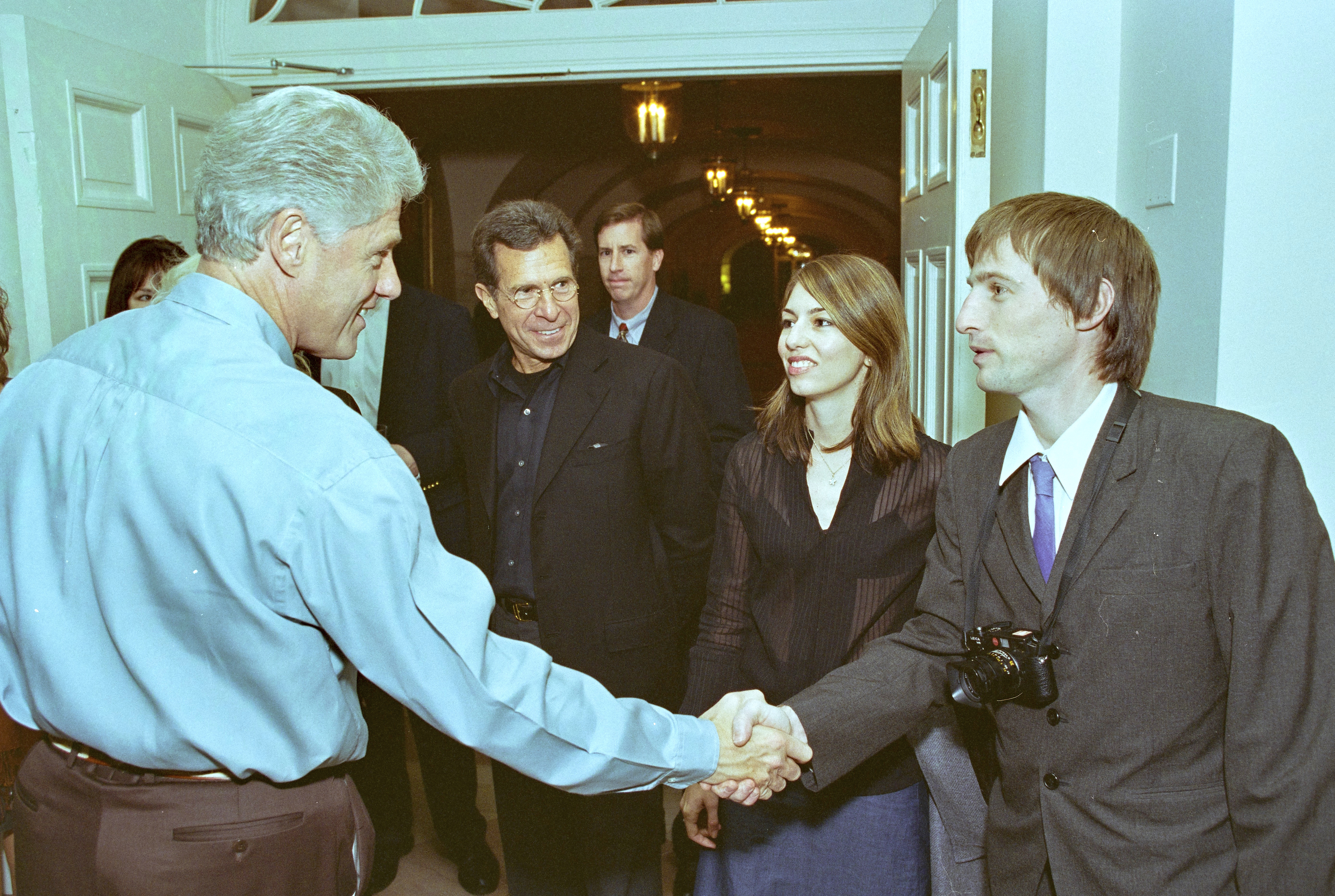
Actor Spike Jonze greets Bill Clinton at screening in the White House.

Peter Bradshaw says, "A strange flavour, but this is an enjoyable and intelligent action film." Roger Ebert of the Chicago Sun-Times gave the film four out of four, writing "Three Kings is some kind weird masterpiece, a screw-loose war picture that sends action and humor crashing head-on into each other and spinning off into political anger". He placed it third on his list of the best films of 1999. David Edelstein of The New York Times said: "It remains the most caustic anti-war movie of this generation."

The director's commentary of the film reveals that then-incumbent President Bill Clinton liked the film so much that he had it screened for his staff, friends and advisors at the White House.

In Reel Power: Hollywood Cinema and American Supremacy Matthew Alford called Three Kings "an unusual ideological product on Hollywood terms, which begins to break down the official history of the Gulf War [...but nevertheless...] suggests that the problems of Iraq can be solved, and only solved, by the application of US force". He observes that Russell "sheepishly indicated Three Kings' ideological consistency with the 2003 Iraq War" when Russell met George W. Bush in 1999(?) and said he was making a film that would question his father's legacy in Iraq. Alford quotes Bush as responding to Russell: "Then I guess I'm going to have to finish the job, aren't I?"

A. O. Scott described 1999 as a magic year for movies, "up there with 1939 and 1962 and 1974", highlighting Three Kings and Magnolia. He chose the movie one of his "Critics' Picks".

== See also ==
- Kelly's Heroes, a 1970 film with a similar premise, set during World War II, based on an actual heist
- Renegades, A 2017 movie about a gold heist in a 1990s conflict
