= Get Smart's Bruce and Lloyd: Out of Control =

- DVD cover
- Directed by: Gil Junger
- Written by: Tom J. Astle; Matt Ember
- Based on: Get Smart by Mel Brooks; Buck Henry; Tom J. Astle; Matt Ember
- Produced by: Alex Gartner; Charles Roven; Andrew Lazar; Michael Ewing; William Green
- Starring: Masi Oka; Nate Torrence; Jayma Mays; Marika Dominczyk; Terry Crews; Larry Miller; Patrick Warburton
- Cinematography: Luke Geissbuhler; Dave Perkal
- Edited by: Dean Holland
- Music by: Paul Linford
- Production companies: Mad Chance; Mosaic Media Group; Callahan Filmworks; Atlas Entertainment
- Distributed by: Warner Bros. Pictures (Note: Released under the Warner Premiere label.)
- Release date: July 1, 2008
- Running time: 72 minutes
- Country: United States
- Language: English

Get Smart's Bruce and Lloyd: Out of Control is a direct-to-video film released in 2008. It is a side spin-off of the 2008 film Get Smart and was released in North America on July 1, 2008, 11 days after the parent film began its theatrical run. Directed by Gil Junger, the film is written by Tom J. Astle and Matt Ember, based upon concepts created for the original Get Smart TV series by Mel Brooks and Buck Henry. The film's DVD sales have passed 100,000 copies with $2.2 million gross.

== Plot ==
Klause Krause is the president of Maraguay and kidnaps a top scientist to work for him.

A new "Optical Camouflage Technology" (OCT) or invisibility cloak is developed by Bruce and Lloyd in the USA, but has a short battery life, lasting only 6 minutes, which they hope to later turn into over 24 hours.

The Lab is bombed and the OCT is stolen. They first think it could be Bob Howard of the CIA, but someone is shown using it in Maraguay, so they decide to break into the Maraguay embassy using a robot called Hymie, which unfortunately fails.

In the lab cameras, an employee Isabella is revealed as stealing the OCT. They think of using Lloyd as a Honey trap to get the OCT back from Isabella, but before Lloyd can hit on Isabella, Howard beats him to it. Before he can charm her though, they use a laser beam to render him bald, and he leaves humiliated.

Isabella meets with President Krause, who tells her the organization KAOS has offered $50 million for the OCT, but the President is more interested in Bruce and Lloyd, the principal developers of the OCT. Isabella wants to trade Bruce and Lloyd for the scientists of Maraguay, one of whom is her father.

Bruce and Lloyd discover that polarized sunglasses act as an anti-OCT to view the invisibility cloak. They enter the Maraguay embassy with Nina, where Isabella offers to help them because the president kidnapped her father. They find the President in his bed and knock him out with a toxic perfume. They open the safe in his room and find the OCT in it, which they use to escape the guards unnoticed.

The President finds and threatens them with a gun, but Lloyd tases him and he is killed when an elk head falls on him. Isabella gives them the cloak and is later reunited with her father.

Bruce and Lloyd are back to their lab, and receive the Presidential medal of freedom.

== Main cast ==
- Masi Oka - Bruce
- Nate Torrence - Lloyd
- Jayma Mays - Nina
- Marika Dominczyk - Isabella
  - Brianna Rain King as Young Isabella
- Patrick Warburton - Hymie
- Larry Miller - The Underchief and his brother
- Ruben Garfias - El Presidente
- Terry Crews - Agent 91
- Amanda Tosch as Agent 34
- Luisa Moraes as Woman in Dress
- Regan Burns - Lab Tech
- Kelly Karbacz - Judy the receptionist
- J. P. Manoux - Neil
- Eddie J. Fernandez - Guard
- Matt Kaminsky - C.I.A. Guy (as Matthew Kaminsky)
- Vincent M. Ward - C.I.A. Agent
- Ernie Grunwald - Laboratory Worker
- Brian Gattas - Laboratory Worker
- Anne Hathaway - Agent 99 (uncredited cameo)
