= Alex Gartner =

American film producer

- Born: United States
- Occupation: Film producer
- Notable work: The Upside of Anger

Alex Gartner is an American film producer. As of 2020, he is a producer with Atlas Entertainment. He was a part of the convoluted, decade-long quest to film Triple Frontier. Formerly, he was a production executive at MGM and Mosaic Media Group.

== Filmography ==
Producer

- The Handmaid's Tale (1990) (Associate producer)
- Josh and S.A.M., (1993) (co-producer)
- Barbershop 2: Back in Business (2004)
- The Upside of Anger (2005)
- Live! (2007)
- Get Smart (2008)
- Get Smart's Bruce and Lloyd: Out of Control (2008)
- Season of the Witch (2011)
- Warcraft (2016)
- Triple Frontier (2019)
- Uncharted (2022)
- Road House 2 (TBA)

Executive producer

- Indecent Proposal (1993)
- Out of Time (2003)
- The Bank Job (2008)
- The Great Wall (2016)
- What/If (2019)
