= Dawn Steel =

American filmmaker (1946–1997)

- Born: August 19, 1946; New York City, U.S.
- Died: December 20, 1997 (aged 51); Los Angeles, California, U.S.
- Education: Boston University; New York University
- Occupations: Film studio executive Film producer
- Years active: 1979–1997
- Known for: Flashdance; Top Gun; Fatal Attraction; City of Angels
- Notable work: They Can Kill You But They Can't Eat You
- Spouses: Ronnie Rothstein (m. 1975; div. 1975) Charles Roven (m. 1985)
- Children: 1
- Parent(s): Nat Steel; Lillian Steel

Dawn Leslie Steel (August 19, 1946 – December 20, 1997) was an American film studio executive and producer. She was one of the first women to run a major Hollywood film studio, rising through the ranks of merchandising and production to head Columbia Pictures in 1987.

== Early life ==
Steel was born to a Jewish family in the Bronx, New York to Nathan "Nat" Steel (born Spielberg), a zipper salesman to the military and semi-professional weight lifter called the "Man of Steel," and Lillian Steel (née Tarlow), a businesswoman.

Lillian Tarlo Steel, Dawn's mother, died from lung cancer at age 55. She was the daughter of Nathan and Rebecca Tarlo, Polish immigrants. She had two brothers named Abraham and Paul. Their name became spelled T-A-R-L-O-W when Abraham joined the U.S. military during World War I. Paul and Abraham's children reside in NYC and Georgia, while Lillian's children live in California.

Dawn grew up in Manhattan and in Great Neck, New York, according to her autobiography. Her brother Larry Steel was her only sibling.

Both of her parents were of Russian-Jewish descent. When she was nine years old, Steel's father suffered a nervous breakdown, so her mother was the family's sole support.

Steel attended the School of Business Administration at Boston University from 1964 to 1965, but left due to financial problems. She attended New York University from 1966 to 1967, studying marketing, but did not graduate.

== Career ==
In 1968, Steel worked as a sportswriter for Major League Baseball Digest and the NFL in New York.

In 1968, after starting out as a secretary, Steel became merchandising director for Penthouse.

In 1975, she founded a merchandising company that produced novelty items such as designer logo toilet paper called Oh Dawn! Inc. One of the products she created was Gucci-logo embellished toilet paper. Within months the Gucci family sued Steel for trademark infringement. Steel hired attorney Sid Davidoff, a former top aide to Mayor John Lindsay. The case was in the news as "toilet paper caper" and was the subject of an editorial cartoon. The case was settled out of court.

In 1978, Steel moved to Los Angeles, working as a merchandising consultant for Playboy.

=== Paramount Pictures ===
In 1978, Steel sold her interest in the Oh Dawn! merchandising business to her ex-husband and asked Davidoff to place a call to Hollywood. Davidoff made an introduction to Richard Weston, who ran Paramount Pictures' merchandising unit. In 1978, Steel joined Paramount Pictures as Director of Merchandising and Licensing, where she planned marketing tie-ins for Star Trek: The Motion Picture. She was promoted to vice president, and then vice president of production in 1980 and senior vice president of production in 1983. She was a protégé of Barry Diller, the CEO of Paramount at the time.

While at Paramount, Steel's support for Flashdance (1983) and the movie's massive success helped her secure the position of president of production for the studio in 1985. She also oversaw Top Gun (1986), Fatal Attraction (1987), and The Accused (1988), among others. Steel was the second woman to head a major film production department, after Sherry Lansing at Twentieth-Century Fox.

=== Columbia Pictures ===
Steel became president of Columbia Pictures in 1987. She was the first female studio head. The first film she approved as president was Casualties of War; Pauline Kael said that "whatever else [Steel] does, she should be honored for that decision, because twenty years later this is still risky material." Under her tenure, the studio also released When Harry Met Sally... which had been developed and produced independently by Castle Rock productions. Steel's brief two-year tenure was marked by continued turmoil and losses, continuing a string of bad news begun under David Puttnam before her appointment. She was asked to leave the studio in 1989 and shortly thereafter Coca-Cola spun off the studio and exited the movie business; Columbia was thereafter sold to Sony Corporation of Japan. She resigned from this position on January 8, 1990.

=== Independent producing ===
==== Steel Pictures ====
In 1990, Steel formed Steel Pictures in a production deal at The Walt Disney Company. She left Disney in 1993 after making two films, 1993's Cool Runnings, a comedy about the Jamaican bobsled team, and Sister Act 2: Back in the Habit. Cool Runnings was her first Disney film as a producer.

==== Atlas Entertainment ====
In 1993, she was considered to join Turner Pictures in an effort to expand into theatrical film production, but it fell apart. Instead, in 1994, Steel formed Atlas Entertainment with husband Charles Roven and Bob Cavallo. They had a three-year first look deal with Turner Pictures. Her final two films before her death from cancer were Fallen and City of Angels.

=== Memoir ===
In 1993, she wrote a memoir, They Can Kill You But They Can't Eat You, which described her time at Columbia. In the book Steel describes finding out – after giving birth to her daughter – that she was fired as President of Production at Paramount.

== Legacy ==
In her obituary for The New York Times, Nora Ephron said:

Dawn certainly wasn't the first woman to become powerful in Hollywood, but she was the first woman to understand that part of her responsibility was to make sure that eventually there were many other powerful women. She hired women as executives, women as producers and directors, women as marketing people. The situation we have today, with a huge number of women in powerful positions, is largely because of Dawn Steel.

Steel's career at Paramount as Chief of Production was referenced in the HBO series Entourage, in the Season Three (2006) episode "What About Bob?", when fictional producer Bob Ryan asks Ari Gold whether Dawn Steel would still be working there, to which Ari replies: "Bob, Dawn Steel died nine years ago."

== Awards ==
In 1989, Steel was awarded the Women in Film Crystal Award for outstanding women who, through their endurance and the excellence of their work, have helped to expand the role of women within the entertainment industry.

== Personal life ==
Steel's father changed the family surname from "Spielberg" before her birth. The name Steel was chosen to reflect her father's weightlifting career.

In 1975, Steel married Ronnie Rothstein, a former business partner in the Oh Dawn! merchandising company. She dated young struggling actor Richard Gere in 1975 and director Martin Scorsese (after his divorce from Isabella Rossellini) in 1983.

In 1985, she married film producer Charles Roven with whom she had a daughter in 1987.

== Death ==
In April 1996, at age 49, Steel was diagnosed with brain cancer and ultimately died on December 20, 1997, after a 20-month battle against the disease. Her film City of Angels was dedicated to her memory.

== Filmography ==
She was a producer in all films unless otherwise noted.

=== Film ===
Year	Film	Notes
1992	Honey, I Blew Up the Kid	
1993	Cool Runnings	
1993	Sister Act 2: Back in the Habit	
1995	Angus	Final film as a producer
1998	Fallen	Posthumous credit
1998	City of Angels	Posthumous credit

=== Television ===
Year	Title	Credit	Notes
1993	For Our Children: The Concert	Executive producer	Television special

== Works and publications ==
- Steel, Dawn. They Can Kill You but They Can't Eat You: Lessons from the Front. New York: Pocket Books, 1993. ISBN 978-0-671-73833-4 OCLC 31007903
- Steel, Dawn. They Can Kill You but They Can't Eat You. New York: Simon & Schuster AudioWorks, 1993. Audio book read by the author (cassette format). ISBN 978-0-671-86555-9. OCLC 28867741

== See also ==
- Film producers
- List of notable brain tumor patients
