= Bob Cavallo =

US entertainment manager and film producer

- Born: 1939 (age 86–87); Brooklyn, New York, U.S.
- Education: Georgetown University
- Occupations: Chairman Disney Music Group, chairman (1998–2011), entertainment manager, film producer, business owner
- Employer(s): Walt Disney Studios (1998–2011), Atlas Entertainment (1988–1998)
- Known for: Purple Rain, co-producer, City of Angels, co-producer 12 Monkeys, co-producer and Fallen, co-producer
- Spouse: Judy Cavallo
- Children: 2, including Rob Cavallo

Bob Cavallo is an American entertainment manager, producer, and business owner. Cavallo worked for Walt Disney Studios from 1998 through 2011, during which time he reorganized the company's recorded music, music publishing and concert operations into one centralized business entity named the Disney Music Group. Cavallo was chairman of the Disney Music Group, which distributes Walt Disney Records and Hollywood Records labels and manages artists Jonas Brothers, Selena Gomez, Grace Potter, Breaking Benjamin, Miley Cyrus and Plain White T's.

== Career ==
=== Music management ===
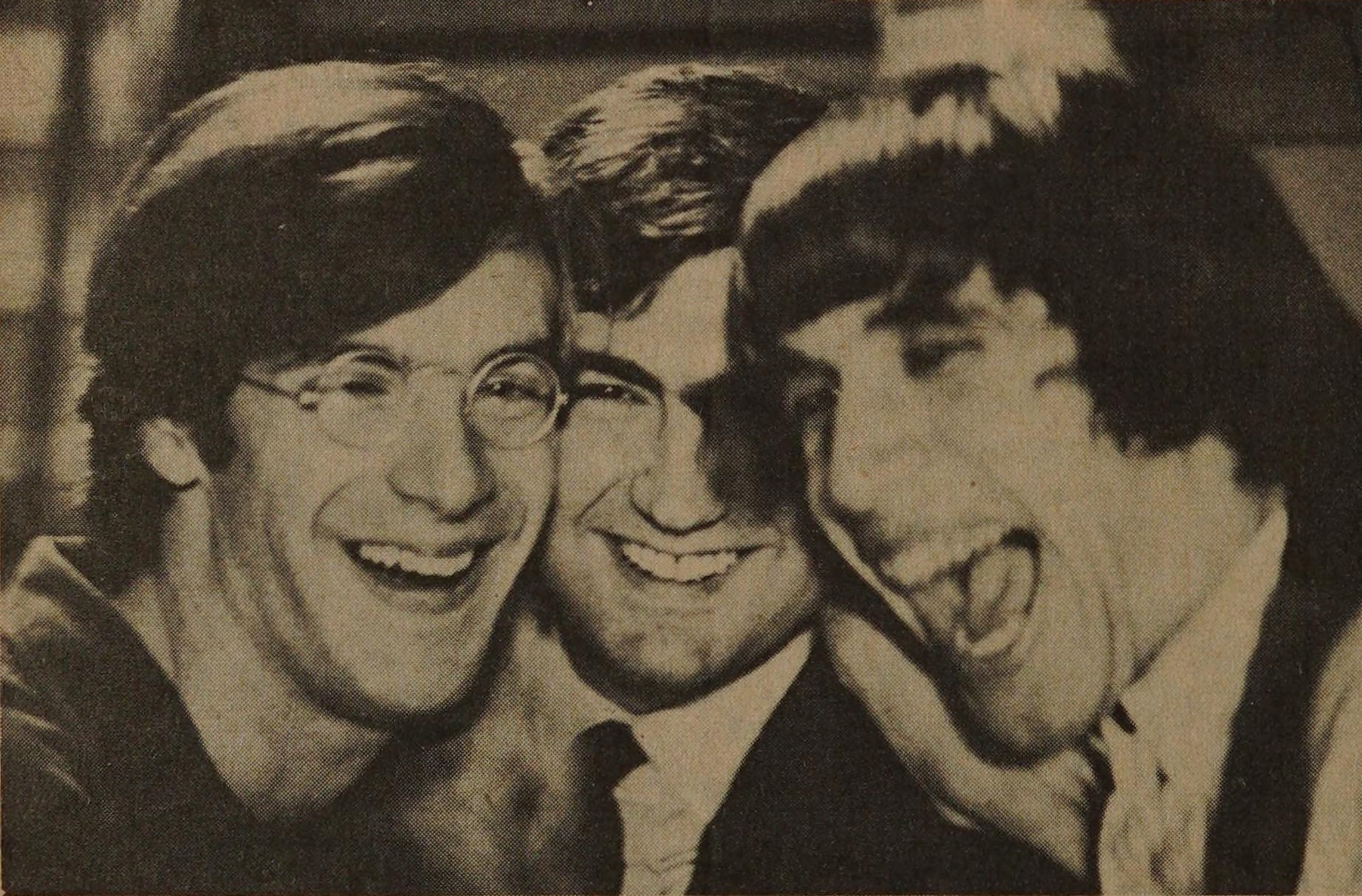
Cavallo (center) with John Sebastian (left) and Zal Yanovsky of the Lovin' Spoonful, 1965

Cavallo's career began as a nightclub owner and event producer before becoming a music manager. While attending Georgetown University, Cavallo promoted several ventures, including the first Intercollegiate Jazz Festival at Georgetown University in 1960. Cavallo also booked musicians Dave Brubeck and Dizzy Gillespie. In 1961, Cavallo and business partner Frank Weis invested in the Shadows, which became a successful night club featuring folk singing entertainment in Washington D.C. Cavallo was an entertainment manager for 35 years managing acts such as the Mugwumps, the Lovin' Spoonful, Weather Report, Little Feat, Prince, and Earth Wind & Fire.

Cavallo founded Third Rail, a management firm which had a client list that included Green Day, Seal, the Goo Goo Dolls, Weezer, Kara's Flowers, Savage Garden and Alanis Morissette. Third Rail earned more than 10 gold and platinum albums and several Grammy Awards.

=== Film producer ===
Cavallo produced the films Purple Rain in 1983 and later Under the Cherry Moon in 1985 both starring Prince. Cavallo along with business partner Charles Roven produced the films City of Angels, 12 Monkeys and Fallen. Cavallo and Danny Bramson produced the music soundtrack for City of Angels featuring the hits "Iris" by the Goo Goo Dolls and "Uninvited" by Alanis Morissette.

=== Walt Disney Company ===
Cavallo worked with Atlas Entertainment from 1988 through 1998. In 1998, he became chairman of the Buena Vista Music Group overseeing Walt Disney Company's recorded music and music publishing operations. During his time with Walt Disney Company's, Cavallo renovated Disney’s music group by reversing the decade-long decline of Walt Disney Records and Hollywood Records by building upon the Disney Channel's youthful stars such as Hilary Duff, star of Lizzie McGuire, who released two soundtracks and five solo albums that sold more than 10 million copies since 2002. Disney Music Group success also included Miley Cyrus in Hannah Montana, Raven-Symoné, Jesse McCartney, and Disney Channel movie soundtracks such as High School Musical, Camp Rock, and Lemonade Mouth. In 2012, Bob Cavallo retired from Disney Music Group.
