= Turner Entertainment Co. =

American multimedia company

- Type: Subsidiary
- Industry: Entertainment
- Founded: August 2, 1986; 40 years ago
- Founder: Ted Turner
- Headquarters: Ted Turner Campus, 1050 Techwood Drive, Atlanta, Georgia, U.S.
- Area served: Worldwide
- Products: Films; Television shows
- Owner: Skydance
- Parent: Turner Broadcasting System (1986–1996); Warner Bros. Entertainment (1996–present)
- Divisions: Turner Home Entertainment (1986–1996); Turner Pictures (1989–1996); Turner Interactive (1994–1996)
- Subsidiaries: Turner Home Entertainment International (1988–1996); Turner Pictures Worldwide Distribution, Inc. (1989–1996); Turner Feature Animation (1993–1997); Hanna-Barbera (1991–1996); Castle Rock Entertainment (1993–1996); New Line Cinema (1994–1996)

Turner Entertainment Co. is an American multimedia company founded by Ted Turner on August 2, 1986. Purchased by Time Warner on October 10, 1996, as part of its acquisition of Turner Broadcasting System (TBS), the company was largely responsible for overseeing the TBS library for worldwide distribution. In recent years, this role has largely been limited to being the copyright holder, as it has become an in-name-only subsidiary of Warner Bros., which currently administers their library. Through WB's parent Skydance, Turner Entertainment also shares common ownership with Paramount Pictures.

== History ==
On March 25, 1986, Ted Turner and his Turner Broadcasting System purchased Metro-Goldwyn-Mayer (MGM) from Kirk Kerkorian for $1.5 billion, and renamed it MGM Entertainment Company, Inc. However, due to concerns in the financial community over the debt-load of his companies, on August 26, 1986, he was forced to sell the MGM name, all of United Artists, and the MGM Culver City studio lot back to Kerkorian for approximately $300 million after just five months of ownership. But in order to still pursue his plans to broadcast the MGM/UA assets as "originals" on his TBS and upcoming TNT channels, Turner struck a deal with Kerkorian: Turner kept the studio's film, television and cartoon library, as well as a small portion of the United Artists library, forming Turner Entertainment Company during the process of this exchange. The new company was headed up by Roger Mayer, who was a former executive of MGM, and formed a development division aimed at making movies and television shows. The library also included most of the pre-1950 Warner Bros. library (including all color Looney Tunes and Merrie Melodies cartoons released before August 1948), the Fleischer Studios/Famous Studios Popeye cartoons originally released by Paramount Pictures, the US/Canadian/Latin American/Australian distribution rights to the RKO Radio Pictures library (not including any films produced by Walt Disney and Samuel Goldwyn), and most of the Gilligan's Island television franchise (excluding the television movie sequels owned by other companies), all of which were owned by United Artists.

In order to save funds, Turner instituted a policy that they would pass up on making sequels to properties now owned by Turner, in favor of colorization of old black-and-white movies. On December 2, 1987, Turner Entertainment had entered into an agreement with American Film Technologies (AFT) to computer-colorize three films from the MGM library that were originally in black-and-white: Boom Town, They Were Expendable and Catered Affair, with Turner having the option for AFT to colorize an additional 22 films, and a second option to do another 24 films by 1992. On December 10, 1987, Turner acquired the worldwide licensing rights to 800 of RKO's films from its then-parent company Wesray Capital Corporation.

On October 3, 1988, Turner Broadcasting System launched the TNT network. This was followed by the April 14, 1994 launch of Turner Classic Movies, which was to air films from the Turner Entertainment libraries (among others), uncut and without commercial interruptions or colorization. In doing so, Turner played a major part in film preservation and restoration. By broadcasting such classic films as King Kong, The Wizard of Oz, Gone with the Wind, Citizen Kane, Casablanca, Meet Me in St. Louis, Singin' in the Rain and the original The Jazz Singer on numerous Turner-affiliated cable channels, as well as in showing them in revival movie houses and on home video worldwide, Turner introduced a new generation to these films.

On November 29, 1989, Turner made another attempt to buy MGM/UA, but the deal failed, and they formed Turner Pictures and Turner Pictures Worldwide instead.

On October 29, 1991, Turner acquired Hanna-Barbera Productions and most of the pre-1991 Ruby-Spears Productions library from Great American Broadcasting for $320 million. Shortly after the acquisition, on October 1, 1992, Turner Broadcasting System launched Cartoon Network, and later Boomerang, to serve as the primary broadcaster of its vast animation library.

On August 17, 1993, Turner purchased Castle Rock Entertainment and New Line Cinema for over $650 million.

Turner Entertainment self-distributed much of its library for the first decade of its existence, but on October 10, 1996, Turner Broadcasting System merged with Time Warner, with the latter doing a large integration of its distribution functions into Warner Bros. As a result, Turner Entertainment is now an in-name-only subsidiary of Warner Bros., serving merely as a copyright holder for a portion of their library. Hanna-Barbera's current purpose as the in-name only unit of Warner Bros. Animation is to serve as the copyright holder for its creations such as The Flintstones, Scooby-Doo and Yogi Bear while Warner Bros. handles sales and merchandising.

== Divisions ==
=== Turner Pictures ===
Turner Pictures
- Type: Division
- Industry: Film
- Founded: October 24, 1989; 37 years ago
- Founder: Ted Turner
- Defunct: November 14, 1996
- Fate: Folded into Warner Bros. Pictures
- Successor: Warner Bros. Pictures
- Headquarters: Atlanta, Georgia, U.S.
- Products: Feature films Documentaries
- Parent: Turner Broadcasting System

Turner Pictures was a film production company and distribution company founded by Ted Turner on October 24, 1989, specifically to produce movies for TNT and international sales in overseas.

As a production company, Turner Entertainment also created original in-house programming, such as documentaries about the films it owns, new animated material based on Tom & Jerry and other related cartoon properties, and once produced made-for-television films, miniseries, and theatrical films such as Gettysburg, Tom and Jerry: The Movie, Fallen, and The Pagemaster under the Turner Pictures banner. In 1995, the Turner Pictures production company developed a film slate. Turner also had an international distribution sales unit, accordingly named Turner Pictures Worldwide Distribution, Inc. (also known as Turner Pictures International).

Turner initially handled made-for-TV movies, specifically for the TNT cable network, until it was expanded to theatrical releases, which led to the aborted hiring of Dawn Steel in 1993, and the hiring of former Columbia Pictures executive Amy Pascal in 1994.

In 1991, the company signed a deal with Live Entertainment to finance Tom and Jerry: The Movie, an animated motion pictue that was intended to be distributed in North America by Carolco Pictures under the Seven Arts label, by New Line Cinema, until Carolco's troubles led distribution to switch to Miramax Films. Also that year, the company signed a deal with First Independent Films for theatrical and home video rights to its titles.

In 1993, the company partnered with New Line Cinema to handle the 70mm theatrical release of Gettysburg, which became a major success that prompted Turner into the world of theatrical movies. The expansion of theatrical releases was funded by the film's success and the subsequent acquisitions of New Line Cinema and Castle Rock Entertainment in 1994, with New Line Cinema planning on to distribute theatrical releases produced by Turner Pictures.

The first major coup came in 1994 when the newly-formed Atlas Entertainment, led by Charles Roven, Bob Cavallo, and Dawn Steel, signed a first-look deal with Turner Pictures. After that, the company inked a deal with Larry Brezner of MBST Entertainment to develop feature films after leaving 20th Century Fox, but it quickly expired in favor of a pact with The Walt Disney Studios due to creative differences on the unproduced film Hamlet.

In 1995, Denise Di Novi, via Di Novi Pictures, had signed a first-look deal with Turner Pictures to produce theatrical feature films. Also that year, the company grew when Turner signed deals with Oliver Stone, Spike Lee, Nora Ephron, Michael Crichton, Robin Swicord, John Travolta, Denzel Washington and Chris Farley, and intended to be a major player in Hollywood under the supervision of Amy Pascal, with distribution intended to be controlled by New Line Cinema.

Turner Pictures was folded into Warner Bros. Pictures on November 14, 1996, after the Turner-Time Warner merger, and currently holds the distribution rights to the films made by the production division. Distribution rights were transferred to New Line Cinema to Warner Bros. Pictures after Turner was folded. Amy Pascal then rejoined Columbia Pictures after Turner Pictures was folded. Two other employees of Turner Pictures, including Matt Tolmach and Kristine Belson then joined Pascal at Columbia Pictures.

Time Warner transferred some of Turner's leftover projects like Any Given Sunday, Scooby-Doo, Practical Magic, City of Angels and You've Got Mail into Warner Bros. In 2001, five years after Turner Pictures shut down and the merger between Turner Broadcasting System and Time Warner, Ted Turner formed his new film production company, Ted Turner Pictures, which was affiliated with Warner Bros., and the only film to came out of the deal was Gods and Generals, which was a flop.

=== Turner Feature Animation ===
Turner Feature Animation
- Type: Animation studio
- Industry: Animation
- Predecessor: Hanna-Barbera Animation
- Founded: 1993; 33 years ago
- Founders: Dennis Miller
- Defunct: 1997
- Fate: Folded into Warner Bros. Animation
- Successor: Warner Bros. Animation
- Headquarters: Atlanta, Georgia, U.S.
- Products: Animated films
- Parent: Turner Broadcasting System

Turner Feature Animation was Turner's animation unit ran as a division of Turner Pictures founded in 1993, and led by Turner Pictures president Dennis Miller, and was later succeeded by Amy Pascal as president. The two animated movies The Pagemaster and Cats Don't Dance were produced under Turner's animation unit. Spun off from the feature film division of Hanna-Barbera Productions, Turner Feature Animation was folded into Warner Bros. Animation in 1997.

The unit came as an outgrowth of the former Hanna-Barbera feature animation unit, who was producing Once Upon a Forest for 20th Century Fox, and signed a partnership between Turner Pictures and Fox to envision and finance the animated feature film The Pagemaster, for release by Fox in 1994, with Turner handling foreign sales.

This was followed in 1993 by two more family films with producer David Kirschner and his partner Paul Gertz through an independent production deal, such as Cats Don't Dance and the unmade Through the Horn.

In 1995, Brad Bird, who was writing for The Simpsons, inked a deal with Turner Pictures in an effort to create their feature animation group and expand their feature animation plans. Also that year, Joy Every, an executive at Hanna-Barbera signed a deal with Turner Featue Animation to work for its independent production company.

Also in 1995, Turner hired Elizabeth Cantillon as executive VP of feature animation to oversee their animated feature films. Later that year, the company signed a first-look deal with Colossal Pictures to develop its feature animation films, starting with a planned adaptation of The Flying Dutchman.

In 1996, distribution of Cats Don't Dance and other planned films transferred from New Line Cinema to Warner Bros. Pictures under the Warner Bros. Family Entertainment label. The relations between Turner and Colossal strained when Turner decided to put their adaptation of The Flying Dutchman into turnaround due to rival Warner Bros. Feature Animation is doing a similar version as executive Joe Kwong included a first-look clause.

Many of its executives, including Brad Bird joined Warner Bros. and joined its in-progress projects already set up at Warners, like The Iron Giant, while cancelling projects already developed by Turner like Ray Gunn and Wolf, a project led by Denis O'Neill.

=== Turner Interactive ===
Turner Interactive is Turner's interactive video game label that was formed in 1994 by Turner Home Entertainment as the company expanded to video game production. The first games to came out of the label were PC CD-ROM game versions of The Pagemaster and Gettysburg, followed by Dinotopia.

In 1995, the company was integrated into Turner New Media, and also opened a separate San Francisco office called Turner Games, and a separate division Turner Learning, which was affiliated with the Cartoon Network, and also purchased the titles of the Incredible Software Factory. In February 1996, the company was dissolved shortly before the merger.

== Home video ==
In the first decade of its existence, Turner released most of its own catalogue on home video through Turner Home Entertainment (THE). However, the MGM and Warner Bros. film libraries which Turner owned were still distributed by MGM/UA Home Video along with THE until their rights expired in 1999, while THE handled the home video distribution of titles from the RKO library. THE released films produced by Turner Pictures on home video with their distributors and independently released the Hanna-Barbera cartoon library on home video.

The company was formed in 1986 by Ted Turner as a subsidiary of Turner Broadcasting System, and its titles was initially distributed by MGM/UA Home Video, before spinning off into its home video distribution label in 1988 when Turner released its first self-distributed title, a computer colorized version of King Kong, followed by other titles drawn from the RKO library and other titles from Turner networks.

THE also released World Championship Wrestling (WCW) pay-per-view (PPV) events, wrestler profiles, and "Best Of" packages on video until the demise of WCW in 2001; the WCW video library, along with the rights to the WCW name and certain talent contracts, were sold to the World Wrestling Federation (WWF, now known as WWE) in March 2001. In 1987, THE had signed a distribution deal with the Video Institute of the Soviet Union to release 10 titles from the pre-May 1986 MGM library in Russian videocassette rental shops, and the deal with Turner would be a first for the Soviet home video market, where officials indicate that there are 660,000 VCR recordings, and films include Zabriskie Point, and other titles, none of them were colorized.

In October 1988, Turner launched an international home video label, Turner Home Entertainment International, which was drawn around the international market.

In 1991, the company entered into a home video deal with First Independent Films for the United Kingdom market. Also that year, the company had absorbed Hanna-Barbera Home Video, a unit of Hanna-Barbera. In April 1992, Turner Home Entertainment signed a home video distribution deal with ACI to handle home video releases of ACI's television movies.

In 1994, the company signed a deal with Prism Entertainment to handle home video releases of its titles. From early 1995 to early 1997, THE also distributed home video releases from New Line Home Video, taking over from Columbia TriStar Home Video as well as distributing PBS programs on home video the year before (taking over from the defunct Pacific Arts). NLHE distributed New Line films on video by itself from 1997 until New Line Cinema merged with Warner Bros. in 2008. PBS shows are now distributed on video and DVD by PBS's own distribution company, PBS Distribution.

In 1995, THE entered a distribution deal with Columbia TriStar Home Video in France, Britain, Germany, Austria and Switzerland, the deal expired in 1997 (although some films released on VHS by THE are distributed in the United Kingdom by First Independent Films).

Upon the Turner-Time Warner merger, THE was absorbed into Warner Home Video as an in-name-only unit in December 1996. However, Turner Classic Movies does release special edition DVD boxsets of films from both the Turner and Warner catalogs under the TCM label. (Some magazines, most notably Starlog, when listing upcoming releases from Warner related to Cartoon Network programming listed it as being released by THE, likely to differentiate it from other, adult-oriented titles.)

== Library ==
Turner Entertainment's current library includes:

- The Brut Productions library
- Material from MGM's predecessors (Metro Pictures, Goldwyn Pictures, and Louis B. Mayer Pictures) (post-1915) that did not enter the public domain and all of Metro-Goldwyn-Mayer's film, television, and cartoon library released prior to May 23, 1986, excluding Babes in Toyland and Electric Dreams, and the 1964–1967 Flipper series and Fame, all owned by Amazon MGM Studios, with ownership of the first three handled through Orion Pictures, and Electric Dreams being copyrighted to MGM via their acquisition of the pre-1996 Polygram Filmed Entertainment library, which included the production library of Virgin Films, the production company for Electric Dreams, as well as the Flip the Frog and Willie Whopper cartoons, either in the public domain or owned by Blackhawk Films, and films owned by third-party companies
- Some material from United Artists, including:
  - The US and Canadian distribution rights to the RKO Radio Pictures library, excluding franchises and films owned by third-party companies (including the Walt Disney Company) or fallen in the public domain
  - Most of the Gilligan's Island franchise (the original series and animated sequels and spin-offs), co-owned with the estate of Phil Silvers
  - The former Associated Artists Productions catalogue, which includes:
    - Warner Bros. Pictures' library of films released prior to January 1, 1950, excluding films that are either in the public domain or owned by third-party companies
      - The pre-September 1948 The Vitaphone Corporation library
    - The Fleischer Studios/Famous Studios Popeye cartoons, originally released by Paramount Pictures between 1933 and 1957
      - The Betty Boop cartoon Popeye the Sailor (1933)
      - Let's Sing with Popeye (1934)

=== Former assets ===
All of the following were transferred to Warner Bros. Entertainment.

- The pre-August 1948 Warner Bros. Cartoons library, excluding films that are in the public domain (color cartoons) (Note: The latest released Warner Bros. cartoon sold to a.a.p. was Haredevil Hare, which was released on July 24, 1948.)
  - Distribution rights to every Harman-Ising-produced Merrie Melodies cartoon, except Lady, Play Your Mandolin!
- Bugs Bunny: Superstar
