= Get Smart (film) =

2008 film by Peter Segal

- Theatrical release poster
- Directed by: Peter Segal
- Written by: Tom J. Astle; Matt Ember
- Based on: Get Smart by Mel Brooks; Buck Henry
- Produced by: Leonard B. Stern; Alex Gartner; Charles Roven; Andrew Lazar; Michael Ewing
- Starring: Steve Carell; Anne Hathaway; Dwayne Johnson; Alan Arkin; Terence Stamp; James Caan
- Cinematography: Dean Semler
- Edited by: Richard Pearson
- Music by: Trevor Rabin
- Production companies: Village Roadshow Pictures; Mosaic Media Group; Brooksfilms; Mad Chance; Callahan Filmworks; Atlas Entertainment
- Distributed by: Warner Bros. Pictures
- Release date: June 20, 2008
- Running time: 110 minutes
- Country: United States
- Language: English
- Budget: $80 million
- Box office: $230 million

Get Smart is a 2008 American spy action comedy film based on the 1965-1970 television series of the same name by Mel Brooks and Buck Henry. Directed by Peter Segal, written by Tom J. Astle and Matt Ember and produced by Leonard B. Stern, who was also the producer of the original series, the film stars Steve Carell, Anne Hathaway, Dwayne Johnson, and Alan Arkin, with Terence Stamp and James Caan in supporting roles. Bernie Kopell, who played Siegfried in the original series, also appeared in the film.

The film centers on highly intelligent analyst Maxwell Smart of the CONTROL agency who, after long dreaming of becoming a real field agent, finally becomes a bumbling one who is tasked with preventing rival spy agency KAOS from carrying out a nuclear terrorist attack.

Get Smart was released in North America on June 20, 2008, by Warner Bros. Pictures. The film received mixed reviews from critics but was a commercial success, earning $230 million on an $80 million budget.

== Plot ==
Maxwell Smart, an analyst for CONTROL, a top secret American intelligence agency, yearns to become a field agent. However, when he finally passes the exam he is blocked by the Chief, who values his analytical skills. After their headquarters is bombed by the terrorist organization KAOS, who also obtain the identities of CONTROL's agents, Smart is promoted to Agent 86 and is paired with Agent 99, who is unknown to KAOS after undergoing plastic surgery, and doubts Max's competence.

Max traces the suspects to Moscow, but while on a commercial flight going there, he is arrested by the Air Marshal after he mistakes his attempts to clean his shoe for a bomb attempt. Detained in the bathroom, after many attempts he manages to break his ties with a specialized Swiss Army knife containing a mini-crossbow.

However, one of the darts hits the "eject" button, sending Max plummeting to earth. Agent 99 jumps after him with a parachute and retrieves him, but is followed by a KAOS assassin. She distracts with a kiss, enabling her to activate the parachute while the assassin crashes into a barn.

Arriving at KAOS' chief bomb-maker Ladislas Krstic's mansion during a party, Max and 99 infiltrate his office. They trace nuclear material to a KAOS nuclear weapons factory disguised as a bakery in Moscow. They are caught by Krstic and his men, but manage to eliminate them before escaping.

At the bakery, Max meets with KAOS boss Siegfried and his second-in-command, Shtarker, both of whom expose him and 99. Smart manages to escape and destroy the factory, but he and Agent 99 are confronted by the assassin from the plane. Smart recognizes him as Dalip from his research and counsels him on his failing marriage, prompting him to let them go.

Agent 23 is sent to observe the factory cleanup, but fails to find evidence as KAOS had snuck the weapons out beforehand. As Max was alone during his key discoveries, CONTROL believes he is a double agent. Agent 99, who has developed feelings for Max, takes him into custody, just when he suspects that she is the double agent.

Siegfried reveals to Shtarker that he plans to detonate a nuclear bomb in Los Angeles while the President of the United States is there. Siegfried contacts the U.S. government and threatens to release nuclear weapon detonator codes to hostile countries unless given $200 billion. However, he is ignored by everyone except the Chief.

Detained in a CONTROL holding cell, Max receives a coded warning from Dalip via American Top 40, alerting him to Siegfried's plan. He escapes and arrives in Los Angeles to reunite with the Chief and Agents 99 and 23, convincing them he is not the double agent. As the President arrives at the Walt Disney Concert Hall, Siegfried, Shtarker and Dalip plant the bomb there.

Agent 23 is revealed to be the real double agent after Max's Geiger counter–equipped watch picks up traces of radiation on him. So, he takes 99 hostage and flees. After a chase, Max rescues her, but in the struggle, the car is set on fire and forced onto railroad tracks. Max kisses Agent 23 to distract him. Both he and 99 are thrown off the vehicle before it collides with a freight train, killing Agent 23.

Analyzing Agent 23's nuclear football, Max realizes the final note of Beethoven's "Ode to Joy" will trigger the bomb. Rushing to the concert hall, Max tackles the conductor just before the final note, saving everyone. Siegfried, dismayed after realizing his plan has failed, insults Dalip's wife and is thrown off by Dalip into a river, to Shtarker's delight.

Max is formally inducted as a spy and is honored at CONTROL headquarters, with Agent 99 giving him a puppy, as they are secretly a couple. Upon leaving, Max attempts to fix a jammed door but gets stuck between the sliding doors and shrieks in pain after again being accidentally struck by a dart.

== Cast ==
- Steve Carell as Maxwell "Max" Smart
- Anne Hathaway as Agent 99
- Dwayne Johnson as Agent 23
- Alan Arkin as The Chief
- Terence Stamp as Siegfried
- Terry Crews as Agent 91
- David Koechner as Larabee
- James Caan as The President
- Masi Oka as Bruce
- Nate Torrence as Lloyd
- Ken Davitian as Shtarker
- David S. Lee as Ladislas Krstic
- Dalip Singh as Dalip
- Geoff Pierson as Vice President
- Bill Murray as Agent 13
- Patrick Warburton as Hymie
- John Farley as Agent 38
- Larry Miller and Kevin Nealon as CIA Agents
- Blake Clark as General
- Cedric Yarbrough as Tate
- Danielle Bisutti as Airline Passenger
- Stephen Dunham as Secret Service Commander
- Kelly Karbacz as Judy, Receptionist at CONTROL Headquarters
- Felisha Terrell as a CONTROL Assistant

Bernie Kopell, who played Siegfried in the original TV series, has a cameo as a motorist. Ryan Seacrest made a voice cameo as himself, hosting American Top 40.

== Production ==
Warner Bros. Pictures and Village Roadshow Pictures owned the rights to the television series of the same name, with Peter Segal attached as a director, after directing three of Adam Sandler's films. Prior to Segal's involvement, the project was in development for years with Jim Carrey, Martin Lawrence, and Will Ferrell attached at one point or another.

According to Segal, he stated in an interview with AMC that he loved the show as a kid. Steve Carell was cast as the main character, Maxwell Smart and Anne Hathaway was cast as Agent 99. Segal and Carell talked about how they had already done "that kind of spoofy police comedy" as Segal directed The Naked Gun 33 1/3: The Final Insult and Carell starred in the scrapped David Zucker pilot H.U.D., and decided to go in a different direction in terms of comedy tone.

== Soundtrack ==
This film's score was composed by former Yes guitarist Trevor Rabin, who had previously scored films such as Armageddon, Enemy of the State and Deep Blue Sea. Varèse Sarabande released a soundtrack album of the score.

=== Track listing ===
All music is composed by Trevor Rabin.

No.	Title	Length
1.	"Smart Dreams"	1:52
2.	"Get Smart Theme"	1:28
3.	"Cake Factory"	3:00
4.	"Theme (Look One)"	1:48
5.	"Max Denied"	2:29
6.	"Max Takes a Bow"	0:54
7.	"Dropping Like Flies"	0:07
8.	"Theme (Look Two)"	2:15
9.	"Agent 23"	0:34
10.	"Max Ejects"	1:53
11.	"Skydiving"	2:01
12.	"Laser Hallway"	4:04
13.	"Entering Moscow"	1:22
14.	"Rooftop Fight"	3:07
15.	"Max Calls 99"	5:01
16.	"Theme (Look Three)"	1:13
17.	"The Big Chase"	4:58
18.	"Wish We Had More Time"	1:46
19.	"Smart Exit"	0:56
20.	"Theme (Look Four)"	1:17
Total length:		42:05

== Release ==
=== Theatrical ===
Get Smart was distributed by Warner Bros. Pictures and released in the United States on June 20, 2008. The film was released in the United Kingdom on August 22, 2008.

=== Marketing ===
In addition to traditional television advertisement and movie trailers, Warner Bros. Entertainment commissioned Pepsi to produce a flavor of Sierra Mist soft drink dubbed "Undercover Orange" to help promote the film. In Latin America, Get Smart was shown in a Spanish language dubbed version, produced in Mexico. The theatrical posters had a sticker that highlighted the return of Jorge "El Tata" Arvizu, a highly regarded Mexican actor who was returning to the character after a 13-year hiatus, having dubbed Don Adams in the 1960s TV series and again in the short-lived 1990s Get Smart TV series starring Andy Dick.

=== Home media ===
Get Smart was released on DVD and Blu-ray on November 4, 2008, by Warner Home Video. Two versions of the film were released: the theatrical version and an enhanced version that allows viewers to view alternate takes and deleted scenes that are placed within the context of the film.

The film was released on DVD in the United Kingdom on February 23, 2009. Approximately 2,088,163 DVD units were sold, translating to revenue of $34,652,714 (Blu-ray sales/rentals not included).

== Reception ==
=== Box office ===
Get Smart opened with $13.3 million on its opening day, and grossed over $38.6 million on its opening weekend in 3,911 theaters, ranking #1 for the weekend of June 20-22. The opening averaged $9,891 per venue. It scored the fifth-highest opening weekend for a film based on a television series at the time. The film later earned $20.2 million on its second weekend and dropped to #3 behind new releases WALL-E and Wanted. In the United Kingdom, the film opened at #3 behind Hellboy II: The Golden Army and Mamma Mia!.

At the end of its box office run, Get Smart recouped its production budget of $80 million as it grossed $130.3 million in the United States and Canada, and $100.3 million internationally, bringing its worldwide total to $230.6 million. It is the 27th highest-grossing film of 2008 worldwide, and the 19th highest-grossing film in the United States and Canada of 2008.

=== Critical response ===
On Rotten Tomatoes, Get Smart has a 51% rating based on 223 reviews with an average rating of 5.60/10. The site's critical consensus reads "Get Smart rides Steve Carell's considerable charm for a few laughs, but ultimately proves to be a rather ordinary action comedy". Metacritic gave the film a score of 54 out of 100, based on 34 critics, indicating "mixed or average" reviews. Audiences polled by CinemaScore gave the film an average grade of "B+" on an A+ to F scale.

The film received positive reviews from Roger Ebert and Lisa Schwarzbaum from Entertainment Weekly. Richard Roeper of the Chicago Sun-Times also gave the film a thumbs up, saying that it was "one of the more pleasant surprises of the year". Critic James Berardinelli also gave it a positive review.

Negative responses came from Glenn Whipp of the Los Angeles Daily News calling it "staggeringly bad" and Mick LaSalle of the San Francisco Chronicle stating that "It couldn't buy a laugh in a nitrous oxide factory with a fistful of clown noses." Kenneth Turan of the Los Angeles Times said "it neglects the laughs and amps up the action, resulting in a not very funny comedy joined at the hip to a not very exciting spy movie."

It also received negative reviews from Richard Schickel from Time and David Ansen from Newsweek, with the latter stating, "it's not Maxwell who's clueless, but the filmmakers ... Director (Pete) Segal ... is a comedy specialist lacking any apparent sense of humor."

=== Awards and nominations ===
Year	Award	Category	Nominated work	Result	Ref.
2009	Casting Society of America	Casting - Big Budget Feature - Comedy	Roger Mussenden	Nominated	
2009	Nickelodeon Kids' Choice Awards	Favorite Movie Actress	Anne Hathaway	Nominated	
2009	MTV Movie Awards	Best Comedic Performance	Steve Carell	Nominated	
2009	MTV Movie Awards	Best Villain	Dwayne Johnson	Nominated	
2009	People's Choice Awards	Favorite Comedy Movie	Get Smart	Nominated	
2009	Teen Choice Awards	Choice Movie: Summer – Comedy	Get Smart	Won	

== Future ==
=== Spin-off ===
A spin-off film, Get Smart's Bruce and Lloyd: Out of Control (featuring Oka, Torrence, Miller, Warburton, Crews and a cameo by Hathaway reprising their roles), was released on DVD on July 1, 2008, eleven days after the feature film's theatrical release. The film tells a standalone story that takes place concurrently with the events within the film (including a scene in which Agent 99 calls Lloyd and angrily berates him for the poor quality of her gadgets compared to Max's; that scene takes place immediately after Max accidentally renders himself unconscious with a blowgun during a stakeout in the main film).

=== Cancelled sequel ===
On October 7, 2008, it was reported that Warner Bros. and Village Roadshow Pictures were producing a sequel. Steve Carell, Anne Hathaway, and Alan Arkin were set to return, but the status of other cast members had yet to be announced. In July 2010, Carell stated that he had recently been given a potential script for the sequel to Get Smart, but had passed on it. He said that he was still very interested in eventually making a Get Smart sequel, but was willing to wait until a decent script was developed.

In 2010, Carell said: "I took a pass at Get Smart 2, write a completely new story and we'll see what happens with that somewhere down the line perhaps... Anne Hathaway is definitely in and Alan Arkin, so at some point... we don't have any projected date and the script still needs some tweaking and some rewriting."

During 2013, Carell stated that it was unlikely that there really would be a sequel. In December 2013, however, Peter Segal claimed a Get Smart 2 had been close to being made, with the "funny script" written by Carell himself.

By 2019, Segal stated that too much time had passed for a Get Smart sequel to be viable. Arkin died in 2023, which would further negate any chance of a sequel.

In 2026, it was announced that a new film was in development with John Mulaney starring as Maxwell Smart. The film will be written by Seth Grahame-Smith.
