= Live! (2007 film) =

2007 film by Bill Guttentag

- DVD cover
- Directed by: Bill Guttentag
- Written by: Bill Guttentag
- Produced by: Charles Roven; Alex Gartner; William Green
- Starring: Eva Mendes; David Krumholtz; Rob Brown; Katie Cassidy; Jay Hernandez; Eric Lively; Monet Mazur; Jeffrey Dean Morgan; Missi Pyle; Andre Braugher
- Cinematography: Steven Kazmierski
- Edited by: Jim Stewart
- Music by: Phil Marshall
- Production companies: The Weinstein Company; Atlas Entertainment; Mosaic Media Group
- Distributed by: Lionsgate Home Entertainment
- Release dates: April 28, 2007 (Tribeca); December 1, 2009 (United States)
- Running time: 96 minutes
- Country: United States
- Language: English
- Box office: $2.2 million

Live! is a 2007 American mockumentary film written and directed by Bill Guttentag, and starring Eva Mendes, David Krumholtz, Rob Brown, Katie Cassidy, Jay Hernandez, Eric Lively, Monet Mazur, Jeffrey Dean Morgan, Missi Pyle, and Andre Braugher. The film had its world premiere at the Tribeca Festival on April 28, 2007. It was released theatrically in select international markets starting in November 2007, followed by a DVD release in the United States on December 1, 2009, by Lionsgate Home Entertainment.

== Plot ==
Television executive Katy Courbet develops what she hopes will become the most watched television show of all time, the ultimate game show called Live!, in which six contestants play Russian roulette with a revolver with six chambers loaded with one live cartridge and five dummy cartridges. During the show, after the cylinder is randomly turned, the six will fire the gun one by one pointed at their head, without intermediate extra turning of the cylinder, until one is killed. At first the idea is to give each of the six contestants $1,000,000, but while there are more applicants at the auditions than expected, they are suicidal people. This is not desired, the contestants should want to live; therefore the prize is raised to $5,000,000 each for the surviving contestants, while the family of the killed contestant does not get any prize.

As the TV executive struggles to overcome the challenges by the Federal Communications Commission, her network, and the show's advertisers, a documentary filmmaker, Rex, films every detail of her glamorous, high-powered life. Rex becomes involved in the making of the show by creating biographical segments about the contestants. They are Byron, a young, struggling writer; Brad, an extreme sports star; Rick, a man who had to spend much on medical bills for his young son and is now trying to save his family's farm; Jewel, an aspiring actress; Abalone, a former supermodel turned performance artist; and Pablo, a young, gay Mexican immigrant determined to help his family.

Jewel is first, Pablo next, both are unharmed. Next is Abalone; before pulling the trigger with the gun pointed at herself she does a performance in which she frightens others by pointing the gun at the host and threatening to kill him; she is also unharmed, but plays falling dead. The fourth is Byron, also unharmed. Brad is fifth and kills himself. Katy is shocked and feels guilty, and goes to the bathroom to throw up. The body is quickly removed off-camera. Rick, who would be sixth, wins the prize without having to pull the trigger. After that, during the after-show press gang, a man comes forward with another gun and kills Katy. The network claims the murder is unrelated to the theme of the show. Apart from the murder the show is a success. It has become an annual broadcast, with six new contestants every year.

== Cast ==
- Eva Mendes as Katy Courbet
- David Krumholtz as Rex
- Rob Brown as Byron
- Katie Cassidy as Jewel
- Eric Lively as Brad
- Jay Hernandez as Pablo
- Monet Mazur as Abalone
- Jeffrey Dean Morgan as Rick
- Missi Pyle as Plummy
- Andre Braugher as Don
- Jessica Collins as Starlet
- Winston Story as Camouflage Guy

== Reception ==
On the review aggregator website Rotten Tomatoes, 47% of 15 critics' reviews are positive, with an average rating of 4.8/10. The website's consensus reads: "Uneven media satire on how far TV will go to secure ratings. Unfortunately it's neither as funny or as sharp as it hopes to be."
