= City of Angels (film) =

1998 film by Brad Silberling

- Theatrical release poster
- Directed by: Brad Silberling
- Screenplay by: Dana Stevens
- Based on: Wings of Desire by: Wim Wenders; Peter Handke; Richard Reitinger
- Produced by: Charles Roven; Dawn Steel
- Starring: Nicolas Cage; Meg Ryan; Dennis Franz; Andre Braugher
- Cinematography: John Seale
- Edited by: Lynzee Klingman
- Music by: Gabriel Yared
- Production companies: Regency Enterprises; Atlas Entertainment
- Distributed by: Warner Bros.
- Release date: April 10, 1998 (United States)
- Running time: 114 minutes
- Country: United States
- Language: English
- Budget: $55 million
- Box office: $198.7 million

City of Angels is a 1998 American romantic fantasy film directed by Brad Silberling, and starring Nicolas Cage and Meg Ryan. Set in Los Angeles, California, the film is a loose remake of Wim Wenders's 1987 film Wings of Desire (Der Himmel über Berlin).

As with the original, City of Angels tells the story of an angel (Cage) who falls in love with a mortal woman (Ryan), and wishes to become human to be with her. With the guidance of a man (Dennis Franz in his final film appearance) who has already made the transition from immortality, the angel falls and begins the human experience.

When producer Dawn Steel saw potential to pursue more story ideas in Wenders's original concept, she and her husband Charles Roven acquired the rights for an English-language adaptation. After years of delay, they found support from Warner Bros. and recruited Silberling and screenwriter Dana Stevens to execute the project. Themes were borrowed from Wenders's work, though the ending was altered, to a more tragic effect. City of Angels was filmed around California and dedicated to Steel, who died before the premiere.

The remake was released to financial success, but mixed reviews, with some critics judging it to be a mawkish adaptation. Despite this City of Angels was praised for its soundtrack and performances which led to its nominations for several awards.

== Plot ==
In Los Angeles, California, Seth is one of many angels who watch over humans, protecting them in unseen ways. His main responsibility is to appear to those who are close to death and guide them to the next life.

During this task, Seth and one of his fellow angels, Cassiel, ask people what their favorite thing in life is. Despite these daily encounters, they struggle to understand human beings and their ways, as angels lack human senses.

While waiting to escort a man undergoing heart surgery to the other world, Seth is impressed by the vigorous efforts of the surgeon, Maggie Rice, to save the ill-fated man's life and her sincere anguish at her failure to do so.

Seth soon becomes focused on Maggie and makes himself visible to her. They develop a connection that soon turns into mutual attraction, although she is already involved with one of her colleagues, Jordan Ferris.

Seth then meets Nathaniel Messinger, one of Maggie's patients, who senses Seth's presence. He tells him that he, too, had once been an angel. Endowed with the same free will as mortals, Nathaniel traded immortality by "falling" to experience humanity firsthand, eventually finding love and raising a family.

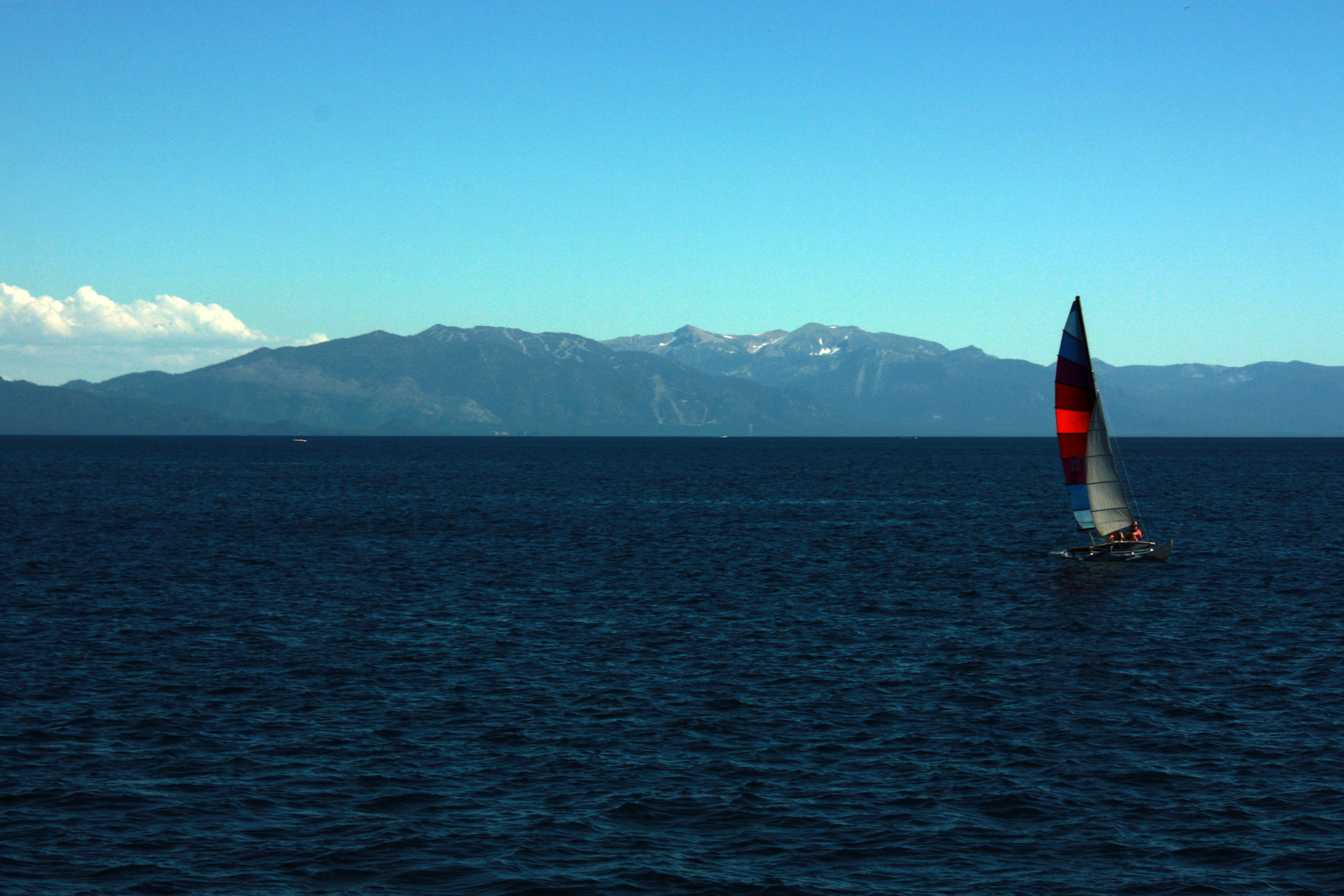
Lake Tahoe is featured in the film.

Seth becomes human by jumping from the top of a skyscraper. Immediately upon awakening, he starts to experience many human feelings and sensations that he had never been able to understand, beginning with physical pain. As a human, Seth heads to the hospital to see Maggie but is told she has gone to her uncle's mountain cabin at Lake Tahoe.

Penniless and naïve, he cannot pay for the journey and gets mugged. He eventually hitches a ride to Lake Tahoe and appears, soaked and cold, at Maggie's doorstep. She realizes he has become mortal for her love, and they make love.

The next morning, as Seth is showering, Maggie rides her bicycle to a local store. On her way back, happy and fulfilled, she rides her bicycle with her eyes closed and her arms wide open. Her happiness is cut short when she fails to notice a logging truck crossing her path and is gravely wounded in the collision.

Seth senses that Maggie is in trouble and runs to her aid. He arrives in time for her to tell him she sees the angel who has come to accompany her. Although Seth can no longer see angels, he senses one nearby and frantically begs Maggie not to look at them. She tells him she is not afraid anymore and that when they ask her what her favorite thing in life was, she will say it was Seth, and she then dies.

Grieving and alone, Seth is visited by Cassiel. He asks if he is being punished for becoming human, and Cassiel assures him that this is not the case. Sometime later, Seth expresses his joy in being human, feeling no regret for his time with Maggie. He has accepted his new life by running into the ocean, feeling the waves at dawn, in sight of the angels.

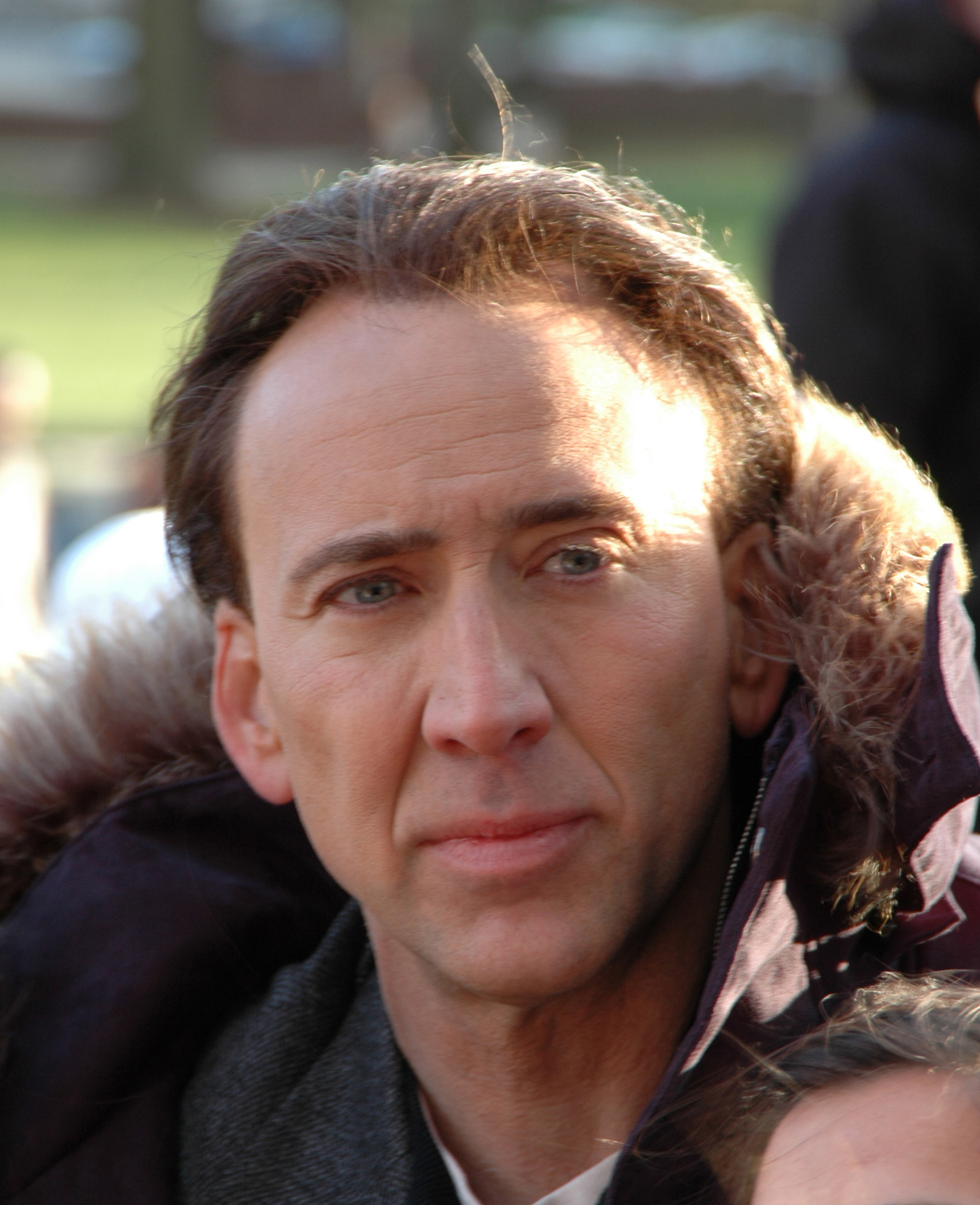
Nicolas Cage stars as Seth.

== Cast ==
- Nicolas Cage as Seth
- Meg Ryan as Dr. Maggie Rice
- Andre Braugher as Cassiel
- Colm Feore as Jordan Ferris
- Dennis Franz as Nathaniel Messinger
- Robin Bartlett as Anne
- Joanna Merlin as Teresa Messinger
- Sarah Dampf as Susan

== Themes ==
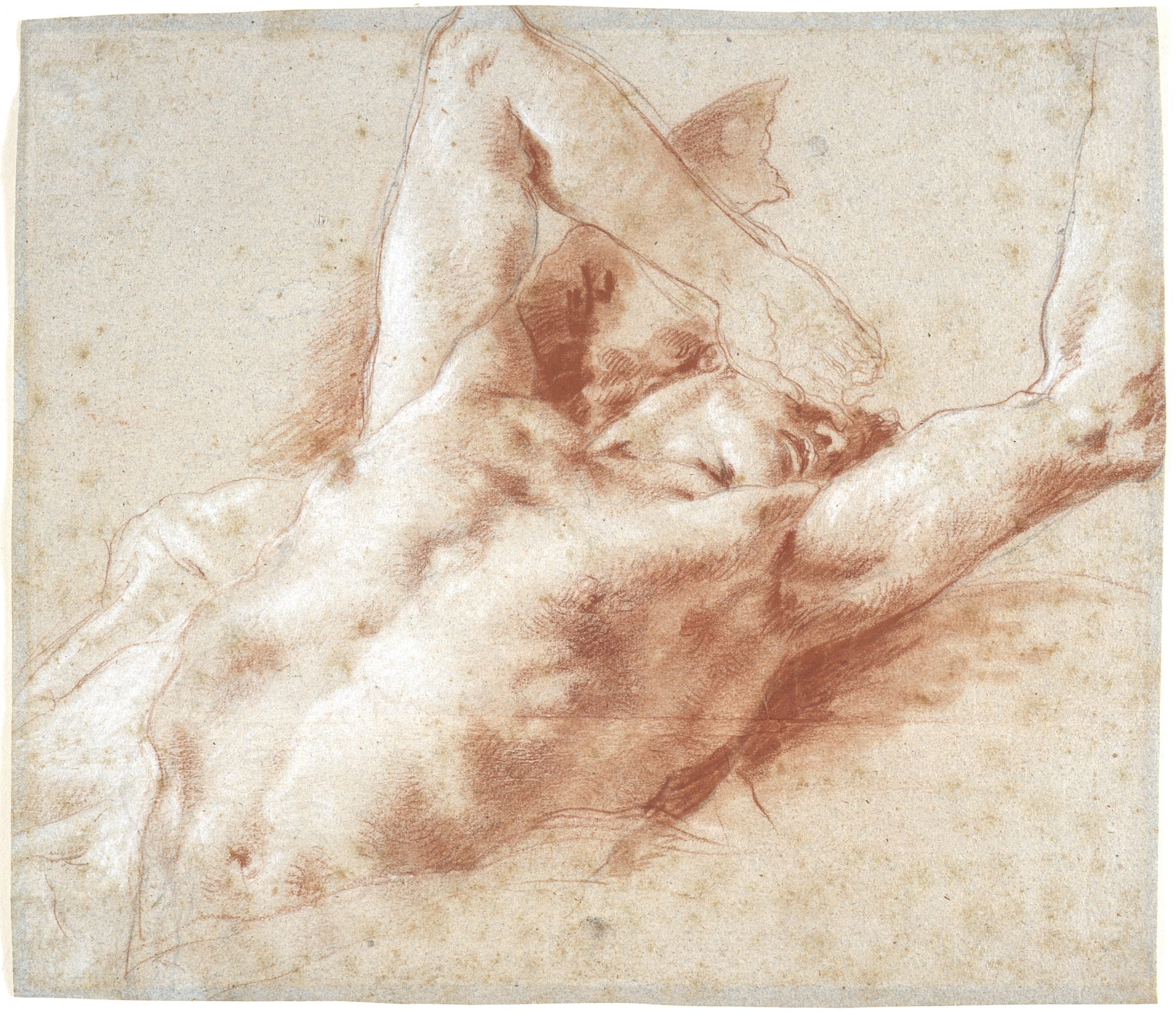
Seth's story invokes the mythology of fallen angels.

City of Angels invokes the idea of the fallen angel in Seth's transformation into a human. However, author Scott Culpepper argues this is not related to evil or exile from heaven, and is instead based on free will. The fact that Maggie is killed very shortly after Seth's transformation poses the question of whether Seth left "heaven for ashes", but the conclusion is that "the very temporality of relationships, experiences and feelings are what make them meaningful". Seth's realization is followed by the concluding scene in which he dives into the ocean, and the otherwise "stoic" Cassiel smiles for him. Sociologists Albert Bergesen and Andrew Greeley write that this communicates "not only the glory of being alive ... but the seeming approval by heaven of that choice".

Writer Brian Godawa interprets the film as having a "humanistic worldview" in which physical experiences humans can enjoy have more value to angels than the spiritual. However, Godawa feels this contradicts 1 Peter 1:12, where "things which angels desire to look into" are spiritual truths in the gospel of the Holy Spirit. Encyclopedist Andrew Tate writes Maggie is a surgeon with no spiritual faith and, through Seth, she "learns to trust the invisible", while Seth learns the wonders of life through her.

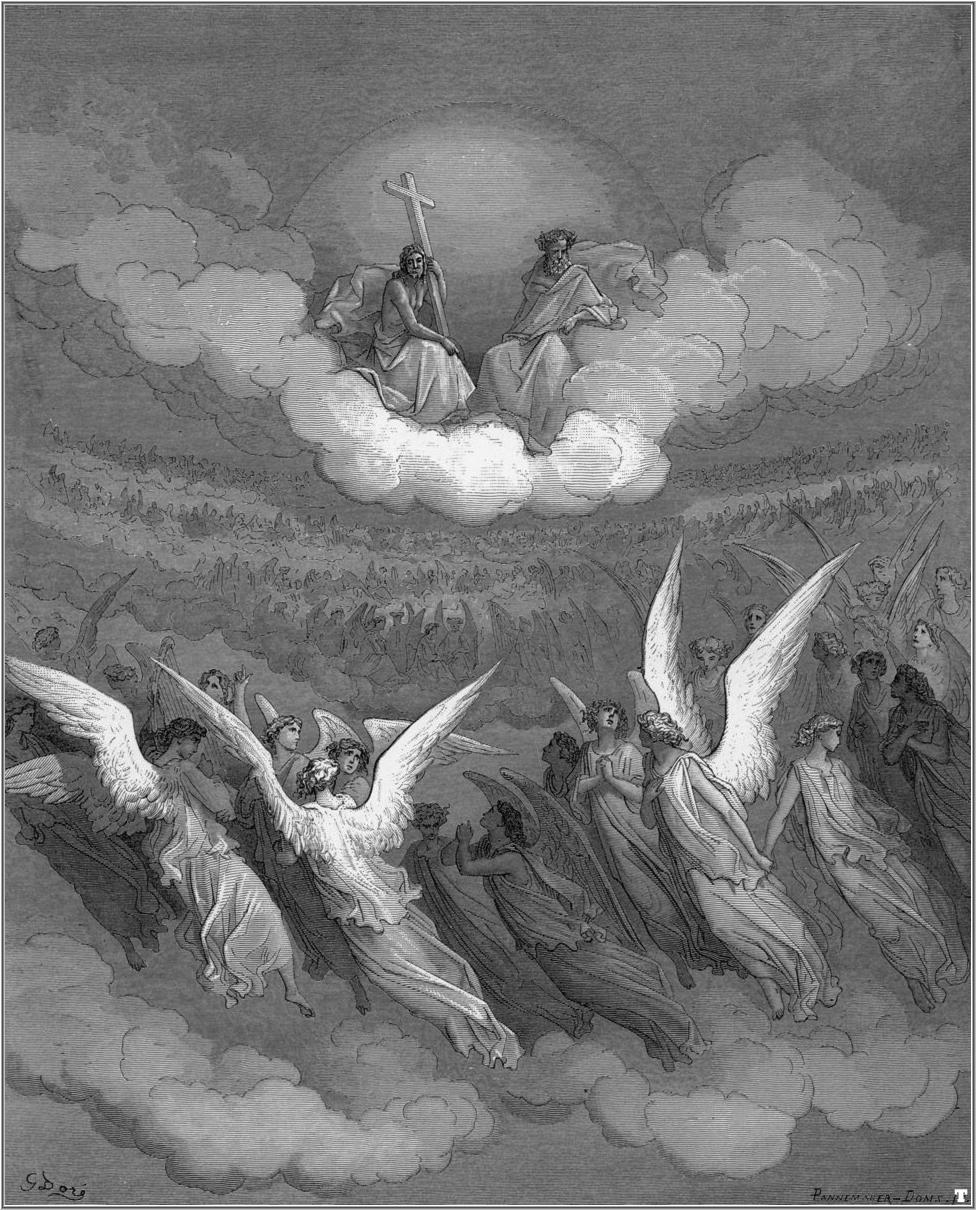
Professor Christopher R. Miller contrasted City of Angels' characters to the angels of Paradise Lost.

Professor Christopher R. Miller observes Seth's book recommendation for Maggie is Ernest Hemingway's A Moveable Feast, but Miller suggests John Milton's Paradise Lost would have been more interesting. Miller contrasted Milton's epic, in which "angels were matter and spirit" and "sybaritic show-offs", with the depiction of the supernatural beings in the film.

Tate believes the fact that angels reside in libraries indicates that they represent "an age of reason, order and learning", though these principles led to decline in faith, contemplating Nathaniel's line "They don't believe in us anymore". Miller questions the "no one believes" line, pointing to 1998 New Age book sales, the play Angels in America and the television series Touched by an Angel.

On the choice of Los Angeles as a setting, Gabriel Solomons contrasts the depiction of the city as a door to heaven to other films depicting it as a "psychological dead end" or actual hell (as in Constantine). However, Professor Jeff Malpas says that, whereas Wings of Desire was informed by Berlin, Los Angeles, sometimes known in real life as the "City of Angels", "provides nothing more than a convenient location".

== Production ==
=== Development ===
Director Brad Silberling praised Wim Wenders' 1987 Franco-German film Wings of Desire, calling it "truly the most incredible cinematic experience of observation of human detail". Silberling, while acknowledging Wenders' film was meant as a tribute to West Berlin, remarked that it became "a larger human discussion". In 1989, at the initiative of producer Dawn Steel, her company reached out to Wenders to purchase the rights for an adaptation. However, production was delayed, as Steel took the project to The Walt Disney Company and Turner Entertainment through its Turner Pictures subsidiary, who gave president Amy Pascal the greenlight, before finally settling at Warner Bros. Pictures, after Time Warner acquired Turner Broadcasting System. Silberling secured the position of director after his success with the 1995 film adaptation of Casper.

While Steel's husband Charles Roven said she "felt that there was another movie in the idea for Wings of Desire", screenplay drafts by various authors dissatisfied her. She subsequently selected Dana Stevens as screenwriter. Stevens professed admiration for Wenders' original and believed she could "capture its essence", while reconsidering its nonlinear narrative. She also defended the California setting, saying "Los Angeles is metaphorically more representative of America than any other city ... It has every personality, and I like the idea of angels being among all these different ethnic cultures".

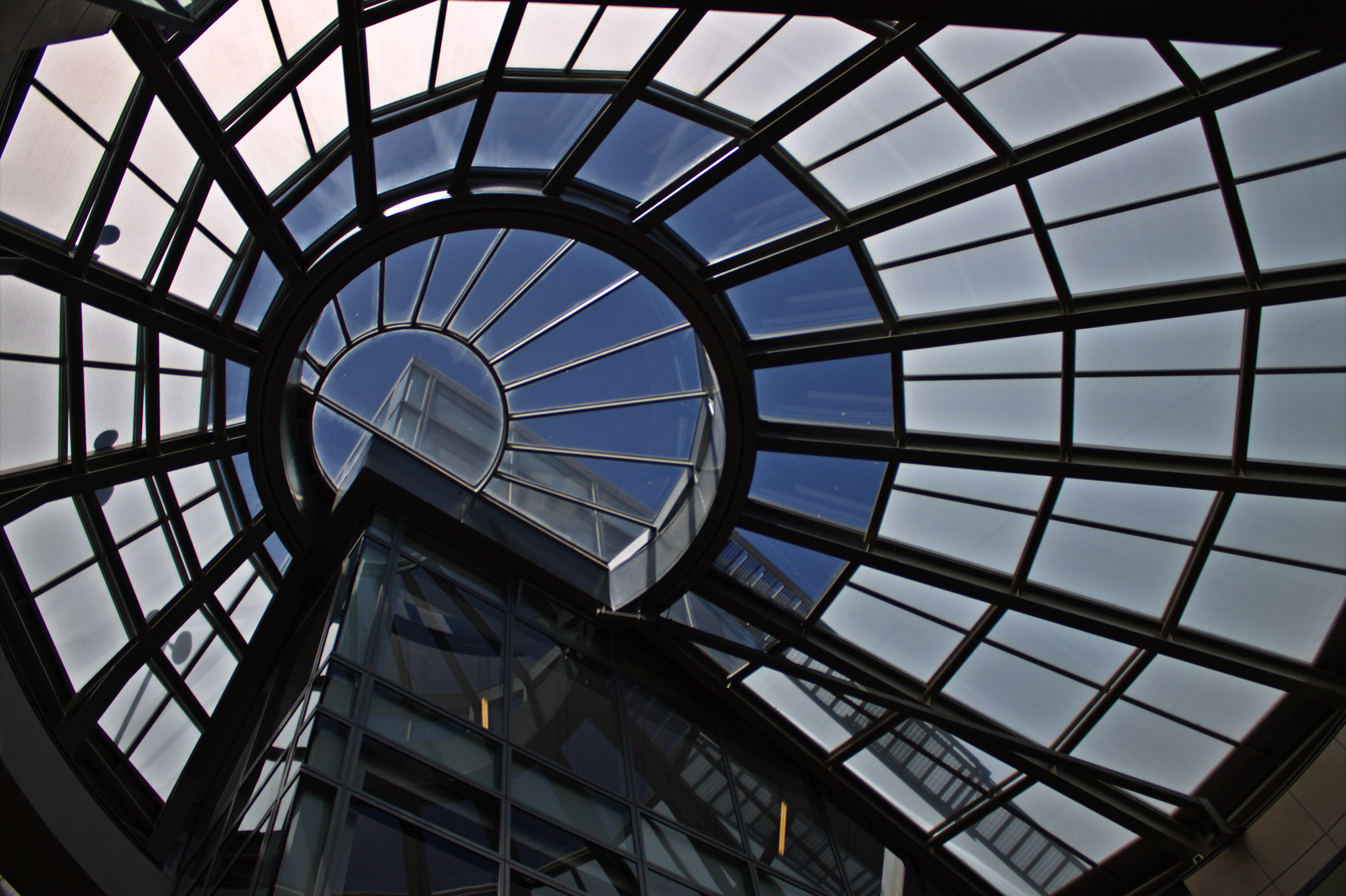
San Francisco Public Library was a filming location.

Star Nicolas Cage said that moving the setting from Berlin in the time of the Wall to Los Angeles demanded story changes, with heavier focus on romance. Silberling and Cage noted the project followed other angel-themed films, such as Michael and The Preacher's Wife, both released in 1996. They were unimpressed with these earlier films, and drew angel wings in the City of Angels screenplay to identify parts they felt needed improvement.

Though Silberling did not use the black-and-white the angels see in the original Wings of Desire and Faraway, So Close!, the remake does borrow the idea of angels inhabiting libraries. Wenders and his crew also developed the costume design of overcoats for angels, with Wenders telling Silberling they experimented with costumes during production before deciding on this look. The ending of the story was altered, so Maggie is killed, a less happy conclusion than the original. Silberling equated this to a scene in Wings of Desire where the angel protagonist goes to the side of a motorcyclist near death.

Silberling claimed there was minimal supervision from Warner Bros. throughout writing and filming, due to priority given to the Batman film franchise. City of Angels was the last film produced by Steel and Roven before her death, and it is dedicated to her.

=== Casting ===
Originally, Silberling envisioned employing novice actors in the lead roles, but acknowledged performers with the level of recognition of Cage and Meg Ryan would attract support for the production. After having completed action-oriented roles in The Rock, Con Air and Face/Off, Cage was eager to star in a more profound film when he received Stevens' screenplay. He agreed to accept the role, noting the spiritual issues in the story and the impact it had on him, but not elaborating on his own beliefs. Ryan also agreed to accept the role of Maggie, remarking "I don't know if angels are floating around, but the idea that there's a guiding force is something I embrace".

Andre Braugher, an actor on the television series Homicide: Life on the Street, was able to work on the project while Homicide was on break before the beginning of its sixth season. His new co-star Dennis Franz was also starring on a police procedural series, NYPD Blue.

=== Filming ===
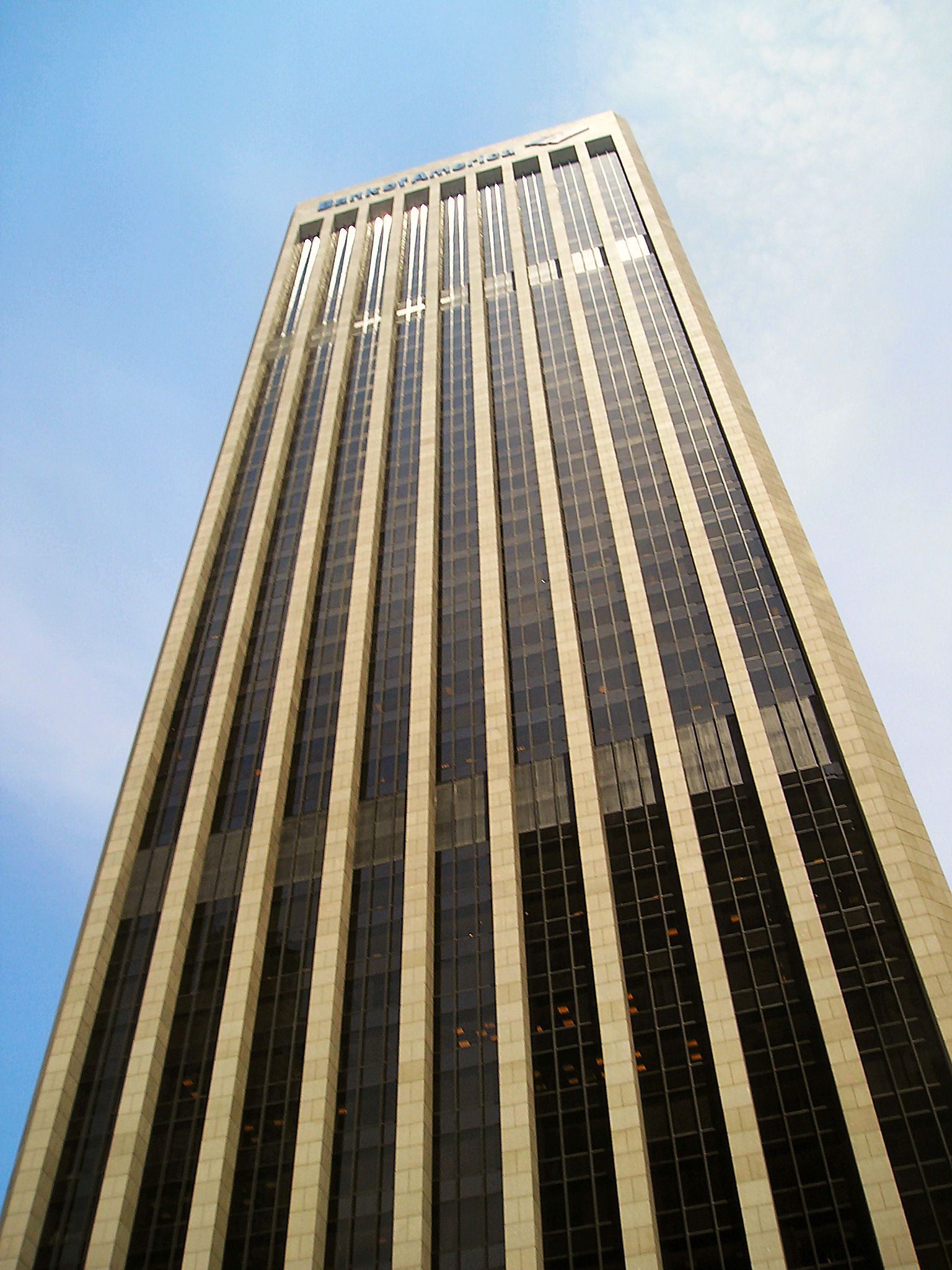
The Los Angeles Bank of America was used for the falling scene.

Cage said that with this role, he had to switch from his regular methods of constant movements to trying to be "effective" while often still. He remarked on having to adopt the mindset of a child, and act impressed by commonplace experiences such as feeling rain or sunlight. A rig for the camera was built for the scene where the angelic Seth sees Maggie look in the mirror, and the crew shot the mirror without the actors for one take so Cage's reflection could be edited out from the take with both.

Other special effects involved a "going to the light" afterlife depiction, in which Seth walks with a little girl, played by Sarah Dampf, who has died. After cinematographer John Seale shot the scene in a hallway, Sony Pictures Imageworks' John Nelson increased the brightness to end in white, adding splinters of light.

Some of the film was shot at Lake Tahoe's surrounding areas and Kern County. The "falling" scene was partially shot at the Los Angeles Bank of America, while Cage was placed on a moving rig over a bluescreen. Ryan's death scene was filmed on Old Mill Road in Crestline, California. The library scenes were shot at San Francisco Public Library. For angel scenes shot at Malibu Beach, though the characters are not physical beings, it was decided that the angels would have briefly visible footprints to avoid the perception that the sand was too hard to leave imprints. Thus, Nelson erased the footprints soon after they are first seen.

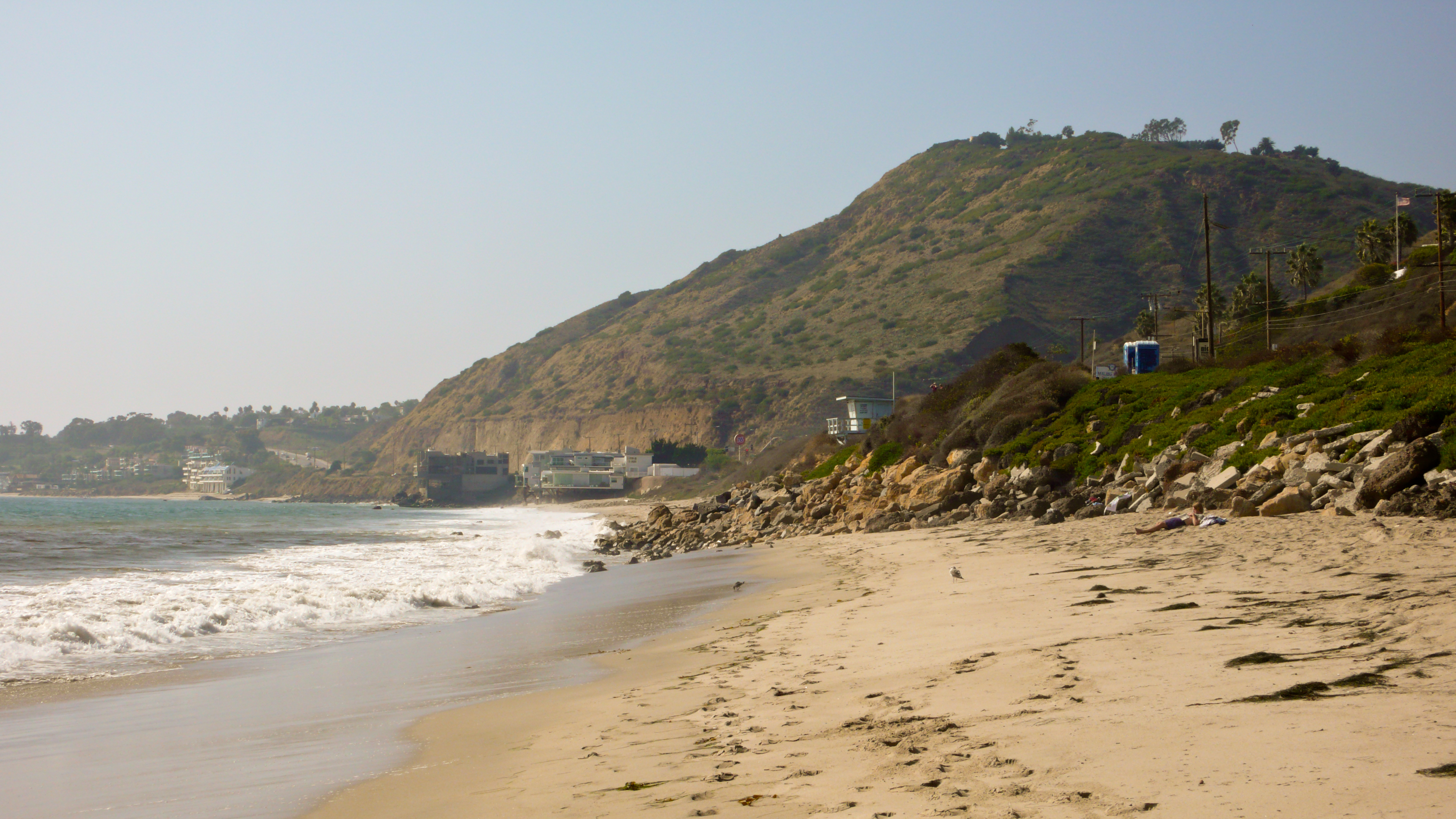
Scenes were shot at Malibu Beach.

=== Music ===
The score was composed by Gabriel Yared, often using three notes to convey ascent. Pop synthesizers, pianos and strings were used for the three-note compositions where the angels observe Los Angeles, where the child in the prologue dies and where Seth experiences Maggie's despair, respectively. Yared also employed violins and celli, sometimes using one to accompany a line of voice-over dialogue and another for follow-up dialogue. Choirs and distant voices reminiscent of Jürgen Knieper's Wings of Desire score can be heard.

The soundtrack debuted at number 23 on the Billboard 200 chart on the issue dated April 18, 1998. Its two singles, the Goo Goo Dolls' "Iris" and Alanis Morissette's "Uninvited", were released to U.S. radio in March and were still receiving substantial radio airplay by August.

While composing "Iris" for the film, songwriter John Rzeznik described feeling inspired to write the lyrics from the point of view of a character, rather than in his own voice. Music author John Braheny wrote that Rzeznik's composition in "Iris" follows a form where a melody, represented by A, is given AAA repetition, with an added repeating chorus lyric.

== Release ==
In test screenings, Silberling said the film had favorable reactions, though with some confused viewers. City of Angels had its debut at Los Angeles' Mann Theatres on April 8, 1998. The screening was held to benefit the Dawn Steel Putting Girls in the Picture Fund, in honor of Steel, who died in December 1997. Silberling, Roven and the stars were in attendance. The film's wider release in the United States took place during the weekend, distributed by Warner Bros.

Warner Home Video published a special edition DVD in December 1998. In 2014, Warner Home Video released a Blu-ray in Region A, with audio commentary from Silberling, Roven and Stevens.

== Reception ==
=== Box office ===
City of Angels grossed $78.7 million in the United States and Canada, and $120 million in other territories, for a total of $198.7 million.

The film opened first in the box office, making $16.1 million in its opening weekend. It displaced Lost in Space, which was first in the box office for one week, after overtaking Titanic, first for 15 weeks. Titanic ranked third behind City of Angels and Lost in Space. City of Angels reached the $100 million mark by October 26, 1998.

=== Critical response ===
On the review aggregator website Rotten Tomatoes, 57% of 58 critics' reviews are positive, with an average rating of 6.2/10. The website's consensus reads: "City of Angels may not tug the heartstrings as effortlessly as it aims to, but the end results will still leave more than a few viewers in tears." Metacritic, which uses a weighted average, assigned the film a score of 54 out of 100, based on 22 critics, indicating "mixed or average" reviews. Audiences polled by CinemaScore gave the film an average grade of "B" on an A+ to F scale.

Roger Ebert gave City of Angels three stars, saying Meg Ryan was at her best here, but the film was "more of a formula story" than the original Wings of Desire, and that many of its qualities were lifted from there. In Variety, Emanuel Levy positively reviewed Cage as "endlessly resourceful" and Ryan as "terrifically engaging". In The Christian Science Monitor, Jennifer Wolcott compared it to Ghost (1990) and Contact (1997) as a U.S. film that could explore religion and love, highlighting Maggie's realization that her life will continue after the death of her blood cells, and that love is more than "a chemical reaction". Sun-Sentinel reviewer Roger Hurlburt praised the acting, direction and "profound" feelings, and advised readers, "don't forget the Kleenex". Wenders was satisfied with the adaptation of his work, remarking, "It's done with respect, with a sense of discovery all its own".

The New York Times's Stephen Holden wrote the standard romantic clichés were "sumptuously" displayed, Cage resembled a serial killer more than an angel, and he preferred Ryan. David Denby wrote in New York that unlike Berlin, Los Angeles offers "the sunlit paradise" where people do not need convincing as to how nice life can be. Entertainment Weekly gave the film a C, with Owen Gleiberman describing it as "a hymn to sappiness". CNN's Paul Clinton dismissed the remake as a "schmaltzy" and "vapid" version of Wings of Desire. The Washington Post's Michael O'Sullivan dismissed it as "a mawkish debasement of its source material", asking "When will Hollywood learn to leave well enough alone?" Michael Wilmington gave it two and a half stars in the Chicago Tribune, enjoying the appearance of the film but concluding it feels "forced and mechanically weepy". Writing for Empire, William Thomas credited Silberling for "a fresh eye", but felt the film fell short in "philosophical claptrap". Andrew Johnston writing in Time Out New York concluded: "In the final reel, what began as a philosophical study of death and longing becomes a blatant tearjerker, but even then the accumulated momentum sweeps you along. Mainstream films are seldom more lyrical."

In 2012, Time included it in its Top ten On-Screen Depictions of Heaven list, for its portrayal of the "go toward the light" afterlife experience. In his 2015 Movie Guide, Leonard Maltin gave it two and a half stars, judging it "still intriguing" though losing much of the atmosphere of the original. That year, Indiewire, in reviewing remakes, called City of Angels "a sickly bastardization" of its source material, though remarking Wenders himself was unable to duplicate its success with his 1993 sequel, Faraway, So Close!. In 2017, MSN included it in its 20 All-Time Worst Movie Remakes list, acknowledging it as a financial hit but "a schmaltzy tearjerker" compared to the poetry of the original.

=== Accolades ===
City of Angels: Music from the Motion Picture received nominations at the 41st Grammy Awards, and the film received nominations and awards at ceremonies honoring cinema:

Award	Date of ceremony	Category	Recipient(s)	Result	Ref(s)
ASCAP Award	1999	Top Box Office Films	City of Angels	Won	
Blockbuster Entertainment Awards	1999	Favorite Actor – Drama/Romance	Nicolas Cage	Won	
Blockbuster Entertainment Awards	1999	Favorite Actress – Drama/Romance	Meg Ryan	Nominated	
Golden Globes	January 24, 1999	Best Original Song	"Uninvited" by Alanis Morissette	Nominated	
MTV Movie Awards	June 5, 1999	Best On-Screen Duo	Nicolas Cage and Meg Ryan	Nominated	
MTV Movie Awards	June 5, 1999	Best Movie Song	"Iris" by Goo Goo Dolls	Nominated	
Satellite Awards	January 17, 1999	Best Original Score	Gabriel Yared	Nominated	
Saturn Awards	June 9, 1999	Best Fantasy Film	City of Angels	Nominated	
Saturn Awards	June 9, 1999	Best Actress	Meg Ryan	Nominated	
Saturn Awards	June 9, 1999	Best Supporting Actor	Dennis Franz	Nominated	

== See also ==
- List of films about angels

== Bibliography ==
- Bergesen, Albert; Greeley, Andrew (2017). "Angel Angst and the Direction of Desire". God in the Movies. London and New York: Routledge. ISBN 978-1351517218.
- Braheny, John (2006). The Craft & Business of Songwriting (Third ed.). Cincinnati, Ohio: Writer's Digest Books. ISBN 1582974667.
- Culpepper, Scott (2016). "No More Mr. Nice Angel". The Supernatural Revamped: From Timeworn Legends to Twenty-First-Century Chic. Rowman & Littlefield. ISBN 978-1611478655.
- Detweiler, Craig (2017). "10. Wings of Desire". God in the Movies: A Guide for Exploring Four Decades of Film. Brazos Press. ISBN 978-1493410590.
- Godawa, Brian (2011). Hollywood Worldviews: Watching Films with Wisdom & Discernment. InterVarsity Press. ISBN 978-0830869534.
- Kalat, David P. (2011). "Andre Braugher". Homicide: Life on the Streets- the Unofficial Companion. St. Martin's Press. ISBN 978-1429938792.
- King, Mike (2014). "Ghosts, Angels and the Afterlife". Luminous: The Spiritual Life on Film. McFarland. ISBN 978-1476613239.
- Laing, Heather (2004). Gabriel Yared's The English Patient: A Film Score Guide. Scarecrow Press. ISBN 0810849658.
- Laing, Heather (2007). Gabriel Yared's The English Patient: A Film Score Guide. Scarecrow Press. ISBN 978-1461658818.
- Malone, Aubrey (2010). Sacred Profanity: Spirituality at the Movies. Santa Barbara, California, Denver and Oxford: Praeger. ISBN 978-0313379222.
- Malpas, Jeff (2008). "Wim Wenders: The Role of Memory". Cinematic Thinking: Philosophical Approaches to the New Cinema. Stanford, California: Stanford University Press. ISBN 978-0804758000.
- Maltin, Leonard (2014). Leonard Maltin's 2015 Movie Guide. Penguin. ISBN 978-0698183612.
- Marcus, Laura (2015). "The Library in Film: Order and Mystery". The Meaning of the Library: A Cultural History. Princeton and Oxford: Princeton University Press. ISBN 978-1400865741.
- Medved, Harry; Akiyama, Bruce (2007). Hollywood Escapes: The Moviegoer's Guide to Exploring Southern California's Great Outdoors. St. Martin's Press. ISBN 978-1429907170.
- Riggs, Thomas (2000). Contemporary Theatre, Film and Television. Vol. 31. Cengage Gale. ISBN 0787646369.
- Riggs, Thomas (2004). Contemporary Theatre, Film and Television. Cengage Gale. ISBN 0787671010.
- Solomons, Gabriel (2011). World Film Locations: Los Angeles. Intellect Books. ISBN 978-1841504858.
- Tate, Andrew (2011). "Angels". Encyclopedia of Religion and Film. ABC-CLIO. ISBN 978-0313330728.
