= Atlas Entertainment =

American film financing and producing company

Atlas Entertainment, LLC
- Logo used since 2019
- Type: Private
- Industry: Film
- Predecessors: Roven/Cavallo Entertainment; Steel Pictures
- Founded: 1994; 32 years ago
- Founders: Charles Roven; Bob Cavallo; Dawn Steel
- Headquarters: Los Angeles, California, U.S.
- Products: Motion Pictures Production and Financing
- Parent: Mosaic Media Group (1999-2008)
- Subsidiaries: Atlas Artist; Atlas Literary

Atlas Entertainment, LLC is an American film financing and production company, started by Charles Roven, Bob Cavallo and Dawn Steel in 1994. Its logo features the Greek Titan Atlas, which was the basis for the company's name.

== History ==
=== Predecessors ===
==== Roven/Cavallo Entertainment ====
In 1978, Charles Roven formed its own Los Angeles-based independent production company, Charles Roven Productions, which in 1988, partnered with Bob Cavallo to became formed Roven/Cavallo Entertainment.

In April 1991, Roven/Cavallo signed a first-look production deal with Tri-Star Pictures, where the following year, TriStar and Roven/Cavallo bought out the rights to Isaac Asimov's The Foundation trilogy, but it never went into production.

==== Steel Pictures ====
In 1990, Roven's wife Dawn Steel, who was formerly an employee of Columbia Pictures formed Steel Pictures, and signed a deal with Walt Disney Studios to produce feature films.

Steel subsequently severed its ties with Disney in late 1992 and went into independent production. Steel attempted to get a job at Turner Pictures to produce films in an effort to expand its theatrical efforts, but Steel never got a job.

=== First stint as independent entity (1994-1999) ===
In March 1994, they merged Roven/Cavallo Entertainment with Steel Pictures to create a new entity Atlas Entertainment, and it signed an exclusive feature film deal with Turner Pictures, with international backers, including TF1. The company already had a combined number of 40 projects from previous deals with TriStar Pictures and Universal Pictures (representing Roven/Cavallo Entertainment) and The Walt Disney Studios (representing Steel Pictures).

In 1997, Bob Cavallo left Atlas Entertainment to join Walt Disney Studios. Later that year, Dawn Steel, a manager in the company, died.

=== As Mosaic Media Group division (1999-2008) ===
On July 29, 1999, Atlas Entertainment was merged with Gold/Miller Management to create Mosaic Media Group. Atlas continued to operate as a division of Mosaic Media Group. In 2000, the combined company had signed a first-look deal with Metro-Goldwyn-Mayer Pictures to develop feature films.

In 2005, the Atlas division bought out the film rights to the God of War film franchise.

=== Second stint as independent entity (2008-present) ===
In 2008, Charles Roven split off their ties from Mosaic Media Group, and relaunched Atlas Entertainment as an independent company, with a first-look deal at Sony Pictures. Also that year, the company signed a deal with Relativity Media to produce feature films.

On May 6, 2014, Atlas promoted Curt Kanemoto from production executive to VP of production, joining Andy Horwitz and Jake Kurily, Topher Rhys-Lawrence from first assistant to creative executive, joining Rebecca Roven and Dan Wiedenhaupt, and promoted Patrick Blood from Atlas executive to VP of legal and business affairs. In December 2014, Atlas started its subsidiary, a management company called Atlas Artists, headed by Dave Fleming.

Charles Roven and Richard Suckle produced 2013 film American Hustle, for which both producers were nominated for Academy Award for Best Picture. 12 Monkeys episode “Mentally Divergent” was also nominated for Cinematography Awards. Atlas also produced the films The Whole Truth with Suckle, while Warcraft (release date June 10, 2016) and Batman v Superman: Dawn of Justice (release date March 25, 2016) with Roven. Uncharted was also produced by Atlas along with Arad Productions. Atlas co-produced the 2023 film Oppenheimer with Syncopy Inc., which won multiple accolades, including the Academy Award for Best Picture for Roven, Emma Thomas and director Christopher Nolan.

== Filmography ==
=== Theatrical films ===
==== 1990s ====
Year	Title	Distributor	Notes	Budget	Gross (worldwide)
1995	Angus	New Line Cinema	co-production with Turner Pictures and the BBC	$1.5 million	$4.8 million
1995	12 Monkeys	Universal Pictures	co-production with Classico	$29.5 million	$168.8 million
1998	Fallen	Warner Bros. Pictures	co-production with Turner Pictures	$46 million	$25.2 million
1998	City of Angels	Warner Bros. Pictures	co-production with TaurusFilm and Regency Enterprises	$55 million	$198.7 million
1999	Three Kings	Warner Bros. Pictures	co-production with Village Roadshow Pictures, Village-A.M. Film Partnership and Coast Ridge Films	$48 million	$107.7 million

==== 2000s ====
Year	Title	Distributor	Notes	Budget	Gross
2002	Rollerball	Metro-Goldwyn-Mayer	co-production with Helkon Media KG, Mosaic Media Group, Toho-Towa and Yorktown Productions	$70 million	$25.9 million
2002	Scooby-Doo	Warner Bros. Pictures	co-production with Mosaic Media Group	$84 million	$275.7 million
2003	Bulletproof Monk	Metro-Goldwyn-Mayer	co-production with Mosaic Media Group, Lakeshore Entertainment and Lion Rock Productions	$52 million	$37.7 million
2004	Scooby-Doo 2: Monsters Unleashed	Warner Bros. Pictures	co-production with Mosaic Media Group	$25–80 million	$181.2 million
2005	The Brothers Grimm	Dimension Films	co-production with Mosaic Media Group, Daniel Bobker Productions and Metro-Goldwyn-Mayer	$80–88 million	$105.3 million
2006	Idlewild	Universal Pictures	co-production with Forensic Films, HBO Films and Mosaic Media Group	$10 million	$12.6 million
2008	Get Smart	Warner Bros. Pictures	co-production with Village Roadshow Pictures, Mosaic Media Group, Mad Chance and Callahan Filmworks	$80 million	$230.7 million
2008	The Bank Job	Lionsgate	co-production with Mosaic Media Group, Relativity Media and Skyline Productions	$20 million	$66.1 million
2009	The International	Sony Pictures Releasing	co-production with Columbia Pictures and Relativity Media	$50 million	$60.2 million

==== 2010s ====
Year	Title	Distributor	Notes	Budget	Gross
2011	Season of the Witch	Relativity Media	co-production with Rogue	$40 million	$91.6 million
2013	Get Lucky	Universal Pictures	under Atlas Independent; co-production with Gateway Films	$5 million	
2013	American Hustle	Sony Pictures Releasing	co-production with Columbia Pictures and Annapurna Pictures	$40 million	$251.2 million
2014	Open Grave	Tribeca Films	under Atlas Independent; co-production with 852 Films and Speranza13 Media	—N/a	$489,812
2016	Mojave	A24	under Atlas Independent; co-production with Henceforth Pictures and MICA Entertainment		$8,602
2016	Batman v Superman: Dawn of Justice	Warner Bros. Pictures	co-production with DC Entertainment, RatPac Entertainment and Cruel and Unusual Films	$250–300 million	$873.6 million
2016	Warcraft	Universal Pictures	co-production with Legendary Pictures, Blizzard Entertainment, Tencent Pictures and Huayi Brothers	$160 million	$439 million
2016	Suicide Squad	Warner Bros. Pictures	co-production with DC Films and RatPac Entertainment	$175 million	$746.8 million
2016	The Whole Truth	Lionsgate Premiere	co-production with FilmNation Entertainment, PalmStar Entertainment, Likely Story and Merced Media	$7.9 million	$1.8 million
2016	The Monster	A24	under Atlas Independent; co-production with Unbroken Pictures	$3 million	$74,700
2016	The Hollow Point	Vertical Entertainment	under Atlas Independent	—N/a	$9,149
2017	The Great Wall	Universal Pictures	co-production with Legendary East, China Film Group, Le Vision Pictures, Dentsu Inc. and Fuji Television Network, Inc.	$150 million	$334.9 million
2017	Wonder Woman	Warner Bros. Pictures	co-production with DC Films, RatPac Entertainment, Cruel and Unusual Films, Tencent Pictures and Wanda Pictures	$120–150 million	$821.8 million
2017	Justice League	Warner Bros. Pictures	co-production with DC Films, RatPac Entertainment and Cruel and Unusual Films	$300 million	$657 million

==== 2020s ====
Year	Title	Distributor	Notes	Budget	Gross
2020	Wonder Woman 1984	Warner Bros. Pictures	co-production with DC Films and The Stone Quarry	$200 million	$188.1 million
2021	The Suicide Squad	Warner Bros. Pictures	co-production with DC Films and The Safran Company	$185 million	$167.4 million
2022	Uncharted	Sony Pictures Releasing	co-production with Columbia Pictures, Arad Productions and PlayStation Productions	$120 million	$407.1 million
2023	Oppenheimer	Universal Pictures	co-production with Syncopy Inc.	$100 million	$976 million
2026	Mercy	Amazon MGM Studios	co-production with Bazelevs Company	$60 million	$54.6 million

==== Upcoming ====
Year	Title	Distributor	Notes
2027	The Thomas Crown Affair	Amazon MGM Studios	co-production with Outlier Society
TBA	American Speed	Amazon MGM Studios	
TBA	Road House 2	Amazon MGM Studios	co-production with Nine Stories Productions and Silver Pictures
TBA	Redcoat	TBA	co-production with Ghost Machine

=== Direct-to-video/streaming films ===
Year	Title	Distributor	Notes
2007	Live!	Vivendi Entertainment	co-production with Vivendi and Mosaic Media Group
2013	Revenge for Jolly!	Sony Pictures Releasing	under Atlas Independent; co-production with Sony Pictures Home Entertainment and A Saboteur
2019	Triple Frontier	Netflix	co-production with Netflix Original Films
2021	Zack Snyder's Justice League	HBO Max	co-production with Warner Bros. Pictures, DC Films, Access / Dune Entertainment and The Stone Quarry
2024	The Killer	Peacock	co-production with Entertainment One, A Better Tomorrow Films and Taewon Entertainment
2025	Vicious	Paramount Pictures	under Atlas Independent

=== Television series ===
Years	Title	Network	Notes	Seasons	Episodes
2015–2018	12 Monkeys	Syfy	co-production with Division Street (seasons 3–4) and Universal Cable Productions	4	47
2018–2020	Dirty John	Bravo (season 1); USA Network (season 2)	co-production with Universal Content Productions, Los Angeles Times Studios and Nutmegger	2	16
2019	What/If	Netflix	co-production with Page Fright, Compari Entertainment and Warner Bros. Television	1	10
2025	Aka Charlie Sheen	Netflix	co-production with Skydance Television, Boardwalk Pictures and North of Now Group	1	2

=== Television films ===
Year	Title	Network	Notes
2010	Scooby-Doo! Curse of the Lake Monster	Cartoon Network	co-production with Warner Premiere, Telvan Productions and Nine/8 Entertainment
