= Fallen (1998 film) =

1998 American film by Gregory Hoblit

- Theatrical release poster
- Directed by: Gregory Hoblit
- Written by: Nicholas Kazan
- Produced by: Charles Roven; Dawn Steel
- Starring: Denzel Washington; John Goodman; Donald Sutherland; Embeth Davidtz; James Gandolfini; Elias Koteas
- Cinematography: Newton Thomas Sigel
- Edited by: Lawrence Jordan
- Music by: Tan Dun
- Production companies: Turner Pictures; Atlas Entertainment
- Distributed by: Warner Bros.
- Release date: January 16, 1998
- Running time: 124 minutes
- Country: United States
- Language: English
- Budget: $46 million
- Box office: $25.2 million

Fallen is a 1998 American supernatural horror crime thriller film directed by Gregory Hoblit and written by Nicholas Kazan. Denzel Washington plays a Philadelphia police detective who is stalked and taunted by a demon possessing people that it uses in a killing spree in a similar fashion to a serial killer he put away. The neo-noir film also stars John Goodman, Donald Sutherland, Embeth Davidtz, James Gandolfini and Elias Koteas in supporting roles. Warner Bros. released Fallen on January 16, 1998. Despite mixed critical reviews and a poor box office performance, it received a cult following.

== Plot ==
Philadelphia Police Department detective John Hobbes (Denzel Washington) visits convicted serial killer Edgar Reese (Elias Koteas) on death row shortly before his execution. Reese appears strangely cheerful, grips Hobbes' hand, and delivers what seems to be gibberish in an unknown language later identified as Syrian Aramaic. As he is executed, Reese mocks the witnesses and sings the Rolling Stones song "Time Is on My Side".

Soon after, a series of murders occurs resembling Reese's crimes. Hobbes and his partner Jonesy (John Goodman) initially assume a copycat killer is responsible. Following clues, Hobbes seeks out Gretta Milano (Embeth Davidtz), whose late father, a detective, committed suicide after being accused of similar occult-related killings. At the abandoned Milano family cabin, Hobbes discovers books on demonic possession and the name "Azazel" hidden beneath layers of paint in the basement.

Gretta warns Hobbes to abandon the investigation but later explains that Azazel is a fallen angel who can possess humans through touch. She reveals that the demon will attempt to ruin Hobbes' life, as he cannot be possessed directly. Hobbes soon notices people around him suddenly singing "Time Is on My Side", realizing Azazel is taunting him by moving from host to host, including fellow officers and civilians.

Azazel escalates by possessing Hobbes' nephew Sam and attacking his intellectually disabled brother Art. The demon then engineers a confrontation that forces Hobbes to shoot a possessed schoolteacher in front of witnesses. Testimonies, influenced by Azazel, implicate Hobbes in the killing. Soon after, Azazel murders Art and marks Sam, prompting Hobbes to hide his nephew with Gretta. She tells him that if expelled from a host body, Azazel can only survive for the length of a single breath before dying.

Determined to end the demon, Hobbes lures Azazel to the Milano cabin. Jonesy and Lieutenant Stanton (Donald Sutherland) arrive, but Jonesy—possessed by Azazel—kills Stanton. Planning to shoot himself so that Azazel will then inhabit Hobbes, Jonesy is mortally wounded in a struggle. Hobbes reveals he has poisoned himself with the same toxin Azazel used to murder Art, ensuring that if possessed, the demon will die stranded in the wilderness without another host nearby. After killing Jonesy, Azazel enters Hobbes but quickly succumbs to the poison.

In a closing voiceover, Azazel ridicules the audience for believing he has been defeated. As he speaks, a cat emerges from beneath the cabin and wanders away; the demon has survived by transferring into the animal. The film ends with the song "Sympathy for the Devil" playing over the credits.

== Cast ==
- Denzel Washington as Detective John Hobbes
- John Goodman as Detective "Jonesy" Jones
- Donald Sutherland as Lieutenant Stanton
- Embeth Davidtz as Gretta Milano
- James Gandolfini as Detective Lou
- Elias Koteas as Edgar Reese
- Gabriel Casseus as Art Hobbes
- Michael J. Pagan as Sam Hobbes
- Robert Joy as Mickey Noons / Charles Olom
- Aida Turturro as Detective Tiffany
- Cress Williams as Detective Joe
- Reno Wilson as Mike
- Renee Spei as Azazel (voice)

== Production ==
Gregory Hoblit and Nicholas Kazan were initially working on an adaptation of James Ellroy's The Big Nowhere when Kazan shared with Hoblit a script titled Fallen which he had penned with Alan Dershowitz. The spec script was sold to Turner Pictures and Atlas Entertainment, outbidding Mandalay Entertainment, Universal Pictures, and Warner Bros. in a bidding war. Hoblit was so impressed with the script he immediately agreed to direct it. Hoblit cited his experience directing police procedural TV shows and how the script reminded him of Rosemary's Baby, The Omen and The Exorcist as motivating factors in wanting to direct the film as it allowed a fascinating opportunity to combine those elements together. Kazan stated that he wanted the demon to remain unseen and implied rather than an explicit monster because real evil is often unseen and unexpected which makes it scary.

== Release ==
Fallen was released in 2,448 theaters on January 16, 1998. It landed at #3 at the box office and made $10.4 million in its opening weekend. In its second weekend, it made $4.9 million. After being in cinemas for four weeks, the film made $23.3 million in the U.S. and $981,200 internationally for a total of $25.2 million.

== Reception ==
On Rotten Tomatoes Fallen has an approval rating of 41% based on reviews from 58 critics. The site's consensus reads: "Has an interesting premise. Unfortunately it's just a recycling of old materials, and not all that thrilling." Metacritic, which uses a weighted average, assigned the film a score of 52 out of 100, based on 28 critics, indicating "mixed or average" reviews. Audiences polled by CinemaScore gave the film an average grade of "C+" on an A+ to F scale.

Janet Maslin of The New York Times called it "A stylish if seriously far-fetched nightmare", but Variety wrote that "Washington has the almost impossible task of holding together a convoluted picture that's only intermittently suspenseful and not very engaging emotionally or intellectually". Roger Ebert gave the film a mixed review, writing "the idea is better than the execution, and by the end, the surprises become too mechanical and inevitable." The Chicago Reader praised Washington's performance, but referring to the film's continual use of the Rolling Stones song "Time Is on My Side", wrote "The first half of this movie holds some promise, but time is not on its side."

Fallen has since gained a cult following and is considered one of Washington's more underrated performances.
