= Charles Roven =

American film producer (born 1949)

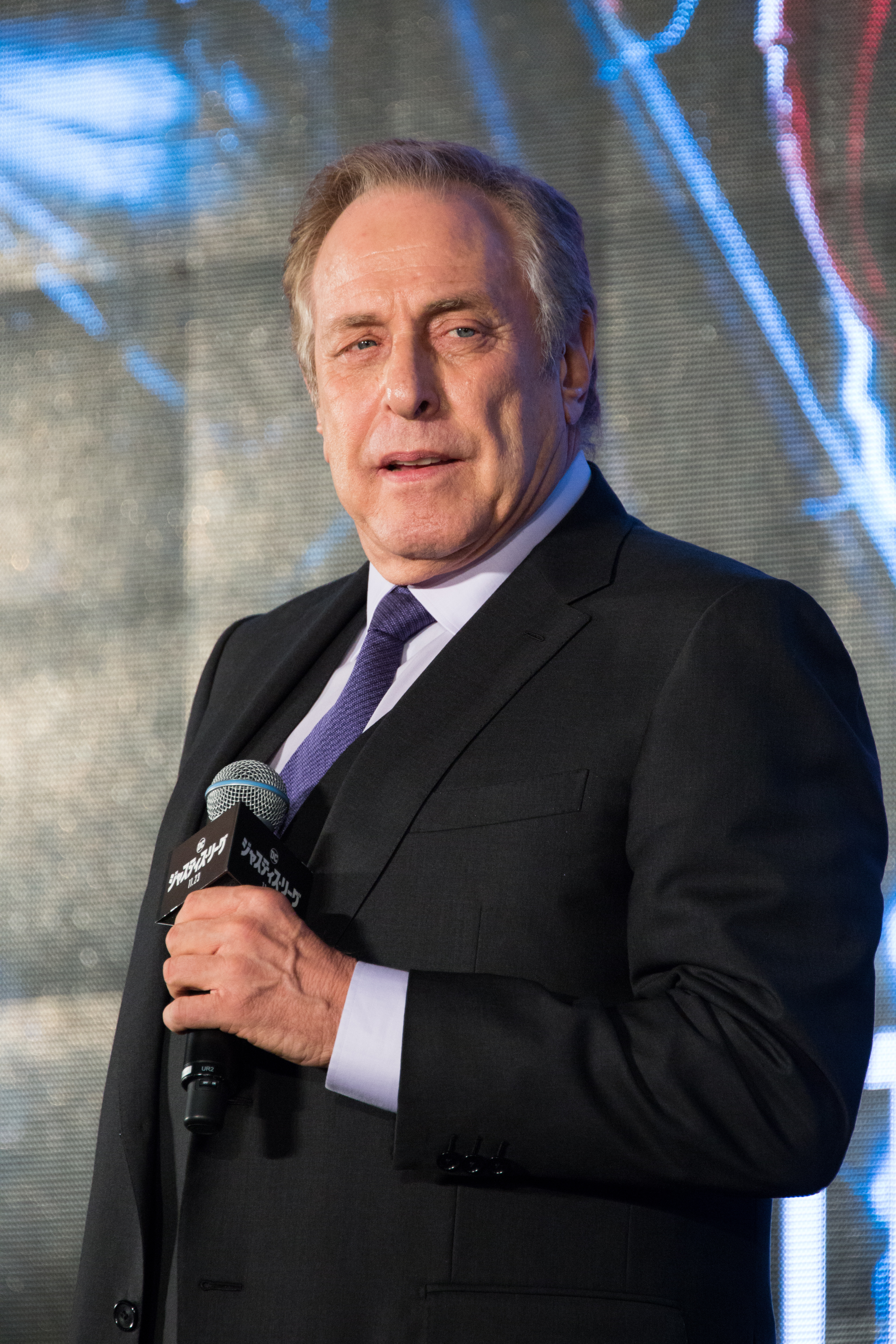
- Roven in 2017
- Born: August 1, 1949 (age 77)
- Occupation: Film producer
- Spouses: Dawn Steel (m. 1985; died 1997): Stephanie Haymes
- Children: 1

Charles "Chuck" Roven (born August 1, 1949) is an American film producer and the president and co-founder of Atlas Entertainment.

He is known for producing superhero films such as The Dark Knight Trilogy, Man of Steel, Batman v Superman: Dawn of Justice, and Suicide Squad.

== Awards and nominations ==
His film American Hustle was nominated for the Academy Award for Best Picture in 2014, as well as in 9 other categories. In January 2018, Roven received the David O. Selznick Achievement Award for his body of work from the Producers Guild of America. He received a Golden Globe Award for Best Motion Picture - Drama for producing Oppenheimer, along with Emma Thomas and Christopher Nolan. He also received the Academy Award for Best Picture for Oppenheimer alongside Nolan and Thomas.

== Personal life ==
He was married to producer Dawn Steel from 1985 until her death in 1997. The two had a daughter born in March 1987. Roven later married restaurateur Stephanie Haymes, the daughter of entertainers Dick Haymes and Fran Jeffries.

== Filmography ==
He was a producer in all films unless otherwise noted. Roven was also producer of the ill-fated Atuk with comedian Sam Kinison as the lead. The film was shut down in its first week of production.

Producer

Year	Title	Notes	Ref.
1973	Some Call It Loving	Assistant producer	
1983	Heart Like a Wheel		
1987	Made in U.S.A.		
1989	Johnny Handsome		
1989	The Blood of Heroes		
1990	Cadillac Man		
1992	Final Analysis		
1995	Angus		
1995	12 Monkeys		
1998	Fallen		
1998	City of Angels		
1999	Three Kings		
2002	Rollerball		
2002	Scooby-Doo		
2003	Bulletproof Monk		
2004	Scooby-Doo 2: Monsters Unleashed		
2005	Batman Begins		
2005	The Brothers Grimm		
2006	Idlewild		
2007	Live!		
2008	The Bank Job		
2008	Get Smart		
2008	Get Smart's Bruce and Lloyd: Out of Control	Direct-to-video	
2008	The Dark Knight		
2009	The International		
2011	Season of the Witch		
2012	The Dark Knight Rises		
2013	Man of Steel		
2013	American Hustle	Nominated — Academy Award for Best Picture	
2016	Batman v Superman: Dawn of Justice		
2016	Warcraft		
2016	Suicide Squad		
2016	The Great Wall	co-produced with Thomas Tull , Jon Jashni and Peter Loehr	
2017	Wonder Woman		
2017	Justice League		
2019	Triple Frontier		
2020	Wonder Woman 1984		
2021	Zack Snyder's Justice League		
2021	The Suicide Squad		
2022	Uncharted		
2023	Oppenheimer	Academy Award for Best Picture	
2024	The Killer		
2026	Mercy		
2026	Ramayana: Part 1	Co-produced along with Namit Malhotra and Yash	
2027	The Thomas Crown Affair		
2027	Ramayana: Part 2	Co-produced along with Namit Malhotra and Yash	
TBA	Road House 2		

Executive producer

- Kicking & Screaming (2005)
- The Whole Truth (2016)
- 12 Monkeys: Recap/Finale (2016) (TV movie)
- 12 Monkeys (2015−17)
- The Brothers Grimm (2017)
- What/If (2019)
- Dirty John (2018−20)
- Scoob! (2020)

Thanks

Year	Film	Role
1989	The Rainbow	The producers wish to thank
2015	No Escape	Special thanks
2016	The Hollow Point	Special thanks
2016	The Monster	The producers wish to thank
2018	Alpha	Special thanks
