= Allen Shapiro =

American film producer

- Born: Chicago, Illinois
- Education: Northwestern Pritzker School of Law
- Occupations: Managing Partner, Mosaic Media Investment Partner
- Known for: Former executive chairman and CEO of Dick Clark Productions; former chairman of TV Guide Network; co-founding SPACs

Allen Shapiro is a media executive and investor. He is the former executive chairman and CEO of Dick Clark Productions (DCP), a former chairman of TV Guide, and a former entertainment lawyer. Shapiro was the executive producer of DCP's flagship programming and oversaw the development, production and licensing of the company's high-profile properties. Since 1999, he is a managing partner of Mosaic Media Investment Partners production and talent management company.

== Life and career ==
Shapiro was born in Chicago, Illinois. He attended Northwestern Pritzker School of Law, earning a J.D. in 1972.

=== Entertainment lawyer ===
Shapiro's professional career began in his hometown of Chicago in the Office of the General Counsel at Playboy Enterprises, Inc.

In 1983, Shapiro joined the law firm of Gipson Hoffman & Pancione, subsequently became a partner. The firm represented numerous entertainment clients including Robert Redford, Sean Connery and Miramax. Shapiro also headed the music practice at Kaplan, Livingston, Goodwin, Berkowitz & Selvin. In private practice, Shapiro specialized in music and entertainment law.

=== Media industries ===
In 1999, Shapiro helped shape a merger between Gold/Miller Management and film music company Atlas Entertainment, that formed Mosaic Media Investment Partners, with himself as a partner and president of Mosaic Media Group; he subsequently serves as managing partner. Early clients included Jim Carrey. Tea Leoni, Vince Vaughn and Keenen Ivory Wayans. After the merger it acquired Dick Clark Productions.

Before joining Mosaic, Shapiro was president / CEO of The IndieProd Company, where he arranged the sale of the company to Carolco Pictures Inc. While at IndieProd, the company produced numerous films and television shows including Universal Soldier, Air America, Roxanne, L.A. Story, Footloose and All That Jazz.

In 2004, Shapiro facilitated the leveraged buyout of DCP from Dick Clark, and became CEO of the company. Three years later, DCP was successfully sold to RedZone Capital Management in June 2007. In October 2012, Shapiro once again became CEO of Dick Clark Productions after the company was purchased from Redzone Capital Management by Guggenheim Partners, Mandalay Entertainment and Mosaic Media Investment Partners. Shapiro is the co-executive producer of "Dick Clark's New Year's Rockin' Eve" and co-produces its successor, "New Year’s Rockin' Eve with Ryan Seacrest" with its host.

Macrovision Solutions Corporation sold its TV Guide Network to Shapiro and One Equity Partners, an investment arm of JPMorgan Chase, for about $255 million in 2008. Three months later, in 2009, Shapiro partnered TV Guide and One Equity Partners with Lionsgate, serving as chairman of the joint venture. Shapiro was responsible for steering TV Guide's overall business strategy, while also overseeing its P&L operations and long-term growth.

In 2013, Shapiro and Keshet International formed a joint venture called Keshet DCP, to serve as a platform for the two companies to jointly finance, develop and produce unscripted television programming in English and Spanish for U.S. and worldwide audiences. One of the first shows Keshet DCP wanted to exploit was Rising Star, a live talent show using real-time audience voting through a downloadable app. Among other DCP productions in 2013, was the American Music Awards followed, in January 2014, by the 71st Golden Globe Awards. That month DCP announced a multi-year television agreement with CBS to broadcast the Hollywood Film Awards.

In 2014, Shapiro made his first appearance on the Billboard Power 100 List at No. 26. In 2015, Shapiro appeared on Billboard's first "TV's Top Music Power Players List", and was No. 25 on the Billboard Power 100 List of the most influential people in the music business.

Shapiro is an investor in the Los Angeles football club Team Liquid, Blaze Pizza, Skims, Epic Games, Niantic, and Next VR, among several other properties. He was an investor in Aviation Gin, which was sold to Diageo in a $610 million deal.

In September 2020, Shapiro partnered with John D. Howard to launch Celebrands, to partner with celebrity owners and others to both found and acquire consumer-facing brands.

In December 2020, Shapiro formed special-purpose acquisition company (SPAC) Bright Lights Acquisition Corp. with former Dick Clark Productions CEO Michael Mahan, which had a January 2021 IPO of $US200 million. Directors include singer-songwriter Ciara and former Dick Clark chairman and media mogul Peter Guber. In November 2021, Manscaped, the men's grooming start-up backed by Channing Tatum, announced a deal with Bright Lights Acquisition Corp. in a deal that values the company at $1 billion.

In 2021, having optioned Dennis McDougal's unauthorized biography of Lew Wasserman, The Last Mogul, Shapiro was reported as co-executive producer, with Mark Canton, of a new film version of the book depicting MCA chairman Lew Wasserman and his "Hollywood fixer", attorney Sidney Korshak.

=== Mosaic Media Group ===
Mosaic Media was formed as a talent management company representing such artists as Will Ferrell, Jim Carrey, Green Day and Alanis Morissette, and as a film production company, which produced shows such as Get Smart. In addition to DCP, Mosaic Media bought and sold Hamstein Music Group, owner of the ZZ Top and Clint Black catalogues, and Daksel Seldak Music, owner of the Aerosmith catalogue. Mosaic Media Investment Partners also acquired the Time Life infomercial business. Mosaic was included in the consortium that took Dick Clark Productions from public to private in 2002. Production credits include:

- Rollerball (2002)
- Scooby-Doo (2002)
- Bulletproof Monk (2003)
- Scooby-Doo 2: Monsters Unleashed (2004)
- Kicking & Screaming (2005)
- The Brothers Grimm (2005)
- Talladega Nights: The Ballad of Ricky Bobby (2006)
- Idlewild (2006)
- Live! (2007)
- The Bank Job (2008)
- Semi-Pro (2008)
- What Happens in Vegas (2008)
- Get Smart (2008)
- Step Brothers (2008)
- Land of the Lost (2009)
- She's Out of My League (2010)
- The Other Guys (2010)
- Bad Teacher (2011)
- The Lazarus Effect (2015)
- Holmes & Watson (2018)

=== TV shows ===
- Bad Teacher (2014)
- Apollo Gauntlet (2016)
- Weird City (2019)
- The Stand (2020–21)
