= All You Need Is Kill (film) =

2025 film by Kenichiro Akimoto

- North American theatrical release poster
- Directed by: Kenichiro Akimoto
- Screenplay by: Yūichirō Kido
- Based on: All You Need Is Kill by Hiroshi Sakurazaka
- Produced by: Eiko Tanaka
- Starring: Ai Mikami; Natsuki Hanae; Kana Hanazawa; Hiccorohee; Mō Chūgakusei
- Music by: Yasuhiro Maeda
- Production companies: Warner Bros. Pictures Animation; Studio 4°C; Warner Bros. Japan
- Distributed by: Warner Bros. Pictures
- Release dates: June 9, 2025 (2025 Annecy International Animation Film Festival); January 9, 2026 (Japan)
- Running time: 82 minutes
- Country: Japan
- Language: Japanese
- Box office: US$741,618

All You Need Is Kill is a 2025 Japanese animated science fiction action film based on the 2004 novel by Hiroshi Sakurazaka. Produced by Warner Bros. Japan and animated by Studio 4°C, it is directed by Kenichiro Akimoto in his feature directorial debut. It is the second film adaptation of the novel, following the American live-action production Edge of Tomorrow.

The film premiered on June 9, 2025, during the Annecy International Animation Film Festival, and opened in Japanese theaters on January 9, 2026. It was released in North American theaters by GKIDS on January 16, 2026.

== Plot ==
Rita Vrataski is a young soldier in the United Defense Force (UDF), a military unit sent to approach and study Darol; an enormous extraterrestrial plant that landed on Earth one year prior and been dormant since. On the aliens' one-year anniversary on earth, Darol sprouts monstrous vegetation which attacks the UDF soldiers. Rita is killed, but awakens again that morning, finding herself trapped in a time loop.

After being killed twice more by the alien vegetation, Rita attempts to escape the time loop both by deserting the UDF and committing suicide by drowning, to no avail. She resolves to fight Darol, despite feeling isolated because no one else is experiencing the time loop's effects, and no one believes her when she tries to tell them. Through numerous loops, Rita improves her combat aptitude against the aliens, but twice experiences a reset of the loop despite not having died.

She soon discovers Keiji Kiriya, another UDF soldier, who is also experiencing the time loop and has been secretly watching her efforts to break free. The two surmise that they are both stuck in the loop, and that it resets if either of them dies, because they were both present when a specific class of the aliens with the ability to manipulate time was killed before Rita died. They assume that if they kill that same alien once more, the time loop may break.

Rita and Keiji eventually succeed in killing the alien again, but find that the time loop simply resets as normal with no apparent changes. As a last resort, they make contact with Shasta Ray, a UDF scientist, who tells them that Darol is seeking to wipe out the human race and is assimilating both of them into itself through the time loop. It is surmised that they will have only one or two more chances to break from the loop before they are completely assimilated.

Rita and Keiji climb Darol to strike its core and defeat it. Keiji realizes that he is being subsumed into Darol first and fights with Rita, insisting that he must be sacrificed in order to defeat it. Rita refuses, as she wishes for both of them to survive. Ultimately, she kills Darol, causing the loop to break and return to the previous morning, where Darol is found to have died, with no one except Rita remembering the cause of its death.

Rita assumes that Keiji died when he was assimilated into Darol, and is at first distraught. However, Keiji is revealed to have survived, although he does not remember the time loop or his experiences with Rita. Rita tearfully reunites with Keiji.

== Voice cast ==
| Character | Voice actor | |
| Character | Japanese | English |
|---|---|---|
| Rita Vrataski | Ai Mikami | Stephanie Sheh |
| Keiji Kiriya | Natsuki Hanae | Jadon Muniz |
| Shasta Raylle Carter | Kana Hanazawa | Lisa Kay Jennings |
| Rachel Kisaragi | Hiccorohee | Cherami Leigh |
| Yonabaru Jin | Mō Chūgakusei | Jonny Cruz |

== Reception ==
On the review aggregator website Rotten Tomatoes, 83% of 41 critics' reviews are positive. Metacritic, which uses a weighted average, assigned the film a score of 64 out of 100, based on 12 critics, indicating "generally favorable" reviews.
