= Stars (manga) =

Japanese manga series

- First tankōbon volume cover, featuring Maho Shirafune

ST&RS -スターズ- (Sutāzu)
- Genre: Science fiction
- Manga
- Written by: Ryosuke Takeuchi
- Illustrated by: Masaru Miyokawa
- Published by: Shueisha
- Imprint: Jump Comics
- Magazine: Weekly Shōnen Jump
- Original run: July 4, 2011 – April 16, 2012
- Volumes: 5
- icon

Stars (Japanese: ST&RS -スターズ-, Hepburn: Sutāzu) is a Japanese manga series written by Ryosuke Takeuchi and illustrated by Masaru Miyokawa. The series follows Maho Shirafune as he tries to become an astronaut. It was serialized in Shueisha's shōnen manga magazine Weekly Shōnen Jump from June 2011 to April 2012, with its chapters compiled into five tankōbon volumes.

== Plot ==
On August 10, 2019, Earth received an extraterrestrial message stating: "Let us meet on Mars on July 7, 2035". With this, a space agency representing all of Earth was formed, named ST&RS. From there on, many different events occurred quite quickly, such as the re-landing of people on the Moon in 2022 and the construction of many new space stations. Later on, the Space Academy was founded as a way to train upcoming generations of ST&RS.

On the same day that Earth received the message from the alien life form, a young boy named Shirafune Maho uttered his first word, and the word was "Mars". Ever since that moment, Maho has been obsessed with astronomy, and the only thing that he has on his mind is the universe. He decides at an early age that he will apply to the Space Academy to train to become an astronaut, along with his childhood friend, Hishihara Meguru, and a transfer student and genius classmate, Amachi Wataru. The newfound trio begins a seemingly impossible journey to get accepted into an academy where all applicants only have a 1% chance of being accepted into the Space Academy.

== Characters ==
Maho Shirafune (白舟 真帆, Shirafune Maho)
A 15-year-old boy with a passion for space, Maho Hoshizora dreams of joining the Space Academy to reach Mars by 2035. Highly knowledgeable about astronomy, he can precisely estimate planetary positions and distances, quickly detecting inaccuracies. Though stubborn at times, he is clever, kind-hearted, and supportive of those in need. He shares a strong friendship with Meguru Hishihara and Wataru Amachi. Maho possesses exceptional spatial awareness called "Dimensional Ability", allowing him to judge distances with precision—such as tossing a bottle into a narrow recycling bin—and reconstruct complex models like the Apollo spacecraft blindfolded using only verbal cues.
Meguru Hoshihara (星原 めぐる, Hoshihara Meguru)
Meguru Hishihara is Maho Hoshizora's childhood friend, born just one day apart in the same hospital. While she often acts as his caretaker, she secretly harbors feelings for him, becoming flustered when the topic arises. Originally an aspiring Olympic volleyball player, she later played a key role in motivating Maho's ambitions. The most physically capable of the trio due to her rigorous training, Meguru has the least familiarity with space compared to Maho and Wataru.
Wataru Amachi (宙地 渡, Amachi Wataru)
Wataru Amachi transfers to Maho and Meguru's school shortly before the space academy briefing session. Sharing Maho's passion for space, he initially aspired to follow his father's medical career until an encounter with an astronaut-physician inspired him to pursue both professions. The most composed member of the group, he maintains his calm demeanor unless someone mocks another's wellbeing. His intelligence makes him the trio's primary source of technical knowledge, and his polite nature earns him considerable popularity among female classmates.

== Publication ==
Stars, written by Takeuchi Ryosuke and illustrated by Miyokawa Masaru, was serialized in Shueisha's Weekly Shōnen Jump from July 4, 2011, to April 16, 2012. Shueisha collected its chapters in five tankōbon volumes released from November 4, 2011, to June 4, 2012.

Shueisha published the first chapter in English on their English Weekly Shōnen Jump website. The manga has been published by Panini Comics in France.

== Reception ==
A columnist from Manga News liked the world building and beginning of the story, stating that they were interested in learning more. They also felt the artwork was detailed. Faustine Lillaz of Planete BD liked the characters, which she felt fit well in the story. She felt the artwork was a bit too detailed and had too much dialogue, though.

== See also ==
- All You Need Is Kill, a light novel whose manga adaptation is written by Ryosuke Takeuchi
- Moriarty the Patriot, another manga series written by Ryosuke Takeuchi
