= All You Need Is Kill =

Japanese light novel by Hiroshi Sakurazaka

- Cover of the light novel released by Shueisha in December 2004
- Genre: Adventure; Science fiction
- Light novel
- Written by: Hiroshi Sakurazaka
- Illustrated by: Yoshitoshi Abe
- Published by: Shueisha
- English publisher: NA/UK: Viz Media
- Imprint: Super Dash Bunko
- Published: December 18, 2004
- Manga
- Written by: Ryosuke Takeuchi
- Illustrated by: Takeshi Obata
- Published by: Shueisha
- English publisher: NA/UK: Viz Media
- Imprint: Young Jump Comics
- Magazine: Weekly Young Jump
- English magazine: NA: Weekly Shonen Jump
- Original run: January 9, 2014 – May 29, 2014
- Volumes: 2
- Films
- Edge of Tomorrow (2014); All You Need Is Kill (2025)
- icon

All You Need Is Kill is a Japanese science fiction light novel by Hiroshi Sakurazaka with illustrations by Yoshitoshi Abe. The book was published in Japanese by Shueisha under their Super Dash Bunko imprint in December 2004, and was later released in English by Viz Media under their Haikasoru imprint. All You Need Is Kill follows a soldier named Keiji Kiriya, who, after dying in a battle with extraterrestrials, is caught in a time loop that makes him live the same day repeatedly, allowing Kiriya to improve his fighting skills.

A manga adaptation, written by Ryosuke Takeuchi and illustrated by Takeshi Obata, was serialized in Shueisha's Weekly Young Jump magazine between January and May 2014 and was also published by Viz Media in its Weekly Shonen Jump magazine. In November 2014, the Viz translation was released in a collected edition that included the entire series. A separate graphic novel adaptation, written by Nick Mamatas and illustrated by Lee Ferguson, was released in North America in May 2014. A live-action film adaptation from director Doug Liman starring Tom Cruise and Emily Blunt, titled Edge of Tomorrow, was released in May 2014. The English-language film tie-in edition of the novel also uses this title. An anime film adaptation produced by Studio 4°C was released in January 2026.

The novel was Sakurazaka's breakthrough science fiction novel, earning wide praise from fellow novelists including Yasutaka Tsutsui and Chōhei Kanbayashi and was entered in contention for the Best Japanese Long Work in the 36th Seiun Awards in 2005.

== Plot ==
The story is told from the perspective of Keiji Kiriya, a new recruit in the United Defense Force. Despite equipping its soldiers with powered exoskeletons, the UDF is losing its fight against the mysterious "Mimics" (ギタイ, gitai), extraterrestrials who have laid siege to Earth. Keiji is seemingly killed on his first sortie after killing an unusual-looking Mimic but, through some inexplicable phenomenon, he wakes and finds he has returned to the day before the battle. As this process continues, he finds himself caught in a time loop as his death and resurrection repeat time and time again. Keiji's skill as a soldier grows as he passes through each time loop in a desperate attempt to change his fate. After several dozen loops, he realizes his fate is similar to that of Rita Vrataski, a prominent ace who preferred to use a battle axe rather than a firearm. He uses his knowledge of the day to get close to her and her mechanic, from whom he gets a copy of her massive axe. He learns to use the weapon well; the boltgun most troops are issued quickly runs out of ammo and jams easily.

Realizing he is a fellow looper, Rita confides in Keiji, telling him of the system the Mimics use: on death, they have the ability to send a signal into the past, allowing them to see the future and change their behavior to avoid that fate. In each group of Mimics, there is one that acts as a central nexus that can cause the day to loop, as well as several antenna Mimics, all of which signal the loop to reset; Keiji became trapped in the loop as a result of contact with one such antenna. To escape as Rita once did, Keiji must first kill all the antennae and then the nexus. The Mimics constantly adapt to Keiji's attacks. He and Rita manage to eliminate the nexus, only to have the loop reset with Rita forgetting what has transpired. After telling Rita this, she acknowledges they missed one antenna. On the 160th loop, they proceed to eliminate the antennae again. Rita then attacks Keiji once they are out of sight of allied forces, explaining her hypothesis that being trapped in the loop has modified their brains. In essence, both of them are similar to the antenna Mimics, meaning one of them has to die before killing the nexus; otherwise, the loop will continue indefinitely. Reluctantly, the two battle. Keiji mortally wounds Rita and stays by her side as she dies. Before Rita dies, Keiji confesses his developing feelings for her before she tells him to win the war quickly and prevent anyone else from suffering their fate. He slaughters the remaining Mimics and destroys the nexus. Weeks later, he is hailed as a new hero of the United Defense Forces while he silently reflects on what transpired and the sacrifice needed for them to win the battle. He paints his exoskeleton blue in honor of her memory.

== Characters ==
Keiji Kiriya (キリヤ・ケイジ, Kiriya Keiji)
Voiced by: Natsuki Hanae (Japanese); Jadon Muniz (English)
A new recruit in the United Defense Force. He finds himself caught in a time loop where he wakes up one day in the past after having been killed on the battlefield. Through the training and battles he experiences in these loops, he comes into his own as a soldier. After the death of Rita and his elevation to hero of the United Army, he is given the moniker, "Killer Cage" and has his armored exoskeleton painted blue in honor of Rita's memory.
In the Edge of Tomorrow film adaptation, his counterpart is an American named William Cage, played by Tom Cruise.
Rita Vrataski (リタ・ヴラタスキ, Rita Vuratasuki)
Voiced by: Ai Mikami (Japanese); Stephanie Sheh (English)
A U.S. special forces soldier. Highly decorated and peerless in battle, she is seen as a hero by the entire world and known as the "Full Metal Bitch" to other soldiers. Her name is a false identity she used to join the UDF at a young age after her parents were killed by Mimics. Like Keiji, she has also been through a loop of her own, from which she gained her experience and reputation, and comes to assist Keiji after learning of his loops. She was noted to hate the color red while favoring blue. However, she chose to paint her armored exoskeleton red in order to draw attention from the enemy in combat. While mortally wounded, she revealed that she knew that their final battle was bound to happen once they met and knew of her eventual fate.
In Edge of Tomorrow, she is played by Emily Blunt, with her nationality changed to British.
Shasta Raylle Carter (シャスタ・レイル・カーター, Shasuta Reiru Kātā)
Voiced by: Kana Hanazawa (Japanese); Lisa Kay Jennings (English)
Rita's mechanic, a bespectacled Native American woman who collects Gashapon. She is the developer of a large battleaxe used by Rita, and later by Keiji.
In Edge of Tomorrow, the character was adapted into the male Dr. Carter played by Noah Taylor.
Bartolome Ferrell (バルトロメ・フェレウ, Barutorome Fereu)
Voiced by: TBA (Japanese); Dave Fennoy (English)
Keiji's platoon sergeant. An overly fitness-conscious Latino-Asian man of Brazilian and Japanese descent who takes care of his subordinates.
In Edge of Tomorrow, his character is changed to that of an American played by Bill Paxton.
Rachel Kisaragi (レイチェル・キサラギ, Reicheru Kisaragi)
Voiced by: Hiccorohee (Japanese); Cherami Leigh (English)
A well-endowed canteen lady, known to have good rapport among the soldiers for her good cooking and looks.
Yonaval Jin (ヨナバル・ジン, Yonabaru Jin)
Voiced by: Mo-Junior High School (Japanese); Jonny Cruz (English)

== Media ==
=== Light novel ===
The original novel, written by Hiroshi Sakurazaka and illustrated by Yoshitoshi Abe, was first published by Shueisha under its Super Dash Bunko imprint on December 18, 2004. A republished version was released on June 19, 2014. Sakurazaka was inspired by an online account written by a video game player, where comments on how restarting the game after the playable character's death allowed for trial and error improvement made the writer conceive a story where a hero wound up "being played over and over". Prior to writing, Sakurazaka consulted other time loop-based fiction such as the film Groundhog Day.

Viz Media released an English-language trade paperback of the novel under their Haikasoru inprint on July 21, 2009. They re-released the novel in North America under the title Edge of Tomorrow on April 29, 2014.

=== Manga and graphic novel ===
A manga adaptation of All You Need Is Kill with illustrations by Takeshi Obata, storyboards by Ryosuke Takeuchi, and character designs by Yoshitoshi Abe was serialized in Japanese in Shueisha's Weekly Young Jump; and English in Weekly Shonen Jump from January 9 to May 29, 2014. The series was compiled into two tankōbon volumes released on June 19, 2014. Viz Media released the manga in English omnibus on November 4, 2014.

An American graphic novel adaptation of the novel, written by Nick Mamatas and illustrated by Lee Ferguson, was released in Viz Media's Haikasoru imprint on May 5, 2014.

==== Manga volumes ====
No.	Original release date	Original ISBN	English release date	English ISBN
1	June 19, 2014	978-4-08-880125-4	November 4, 2014	978-1-42-157601-5
2	June 19, 2014	978-4-08-880126-1	November 4, 2014	978-1-42-157601-5

=== Live-action film ===
Edge of Tomorrow is a 2014 American science fiction action film based on the novel. The film, directed by Doug Liman and produced by Warner Bros. Pictures and Village Roadshow, stars Tom Cruise as William Cage (the film's counterpart to Keiji Kiriya) and Emily Blunt as Rita Vrataski. The setting is changed to Western Europe, with the battle being a strike into Normandy that begins at Heathrow Airport. The ending is also significantly different from the original novel the film is based on. The film was released in theaters on May 30, 2014, in the United Kingdom, June 6, 2014, in North America, and July 4, 2014, in Japan.

=== Anime film ===
An anime film adaptation was announced on March 13, 2025. The film is produced by Warner Bros. Japan, animated by Studio 4°C and directed by Kenichiro Akimoto. The film is a retelling of the story from another point of view from the original novel and the American film adaptation. The film premiered on June 9, 2025, during the Annecy International Animation Film Festival, and opened in Japanese theaters on January 9, 2026. The theme song is "Tsuretette" performed by Akasaki. GKIDS licensed the film for distribution in North America, the UK, Ireland, Australia and New Zealand, and it opened in North American theaters on January 16, 2026.

== Reception ==
All You Need Is Kill was nominated for the Best Japanese Long Work category at the 36th Seiun Awards in 2005.

The manga was nominated for the "Best U.S. Edition of International Material—Asia" category at the 2015 Eisner Awards.

== See also ==
- Moriarty the Patriot, a manga series written by Ryōsuke Takeuchi
- Stars, a manga series written by Ryōsuke Takeuchi
- 2023 Prague shootings, the perpetrator of which styled himself as Keiji Kiriya
