= Modern Magic Made Simple =

Japanese light novel series

- Cover art for the new edition of the first light novel, featuring the main cast of characters

よくわかる現代魔法 (Yoku Wakaru Gendai Mahō)
- Light novel
- Written by: Hiroshi Sakurazaka
- Illustrated by: Miki Miyashita
- Published by: Shueisha
- Imprint: Super Dash Bunko
- Original run: December 25, 2003 – present
- Volumes: 6
- Manga

Yoku Wakaru Gendai Mahō comic edition
- Written by: Hiroshi Sakurazaka
- Illustrated by: Miki Miyashita
- Published by: Shueisha
- Magazine: Jump Square
- Original run: August 4, 2008 – September, 2009
- Anime television series
- Directed by: Yasuhiro Kuroda
- Produced by: Tetsuro Satomi; Nobuhiro Nakayama; Katsumi Koike; Takashi Takano; Tsuneo Takechi
- Written by: Yasuhiro Kuroda; Yūichi Kadota
- Music by: Yukari Hashimoto
- Studio: Nomad
- Licensed by: NA: Sentai Filmworks
- Original network: BS11, AT-X, Bandai Channel, Kids Station
- English network: NA: Anime Network
- Original run: July 11, 2009 – September 26, 2009
- Episodes: 12 + Special

Modern Magic Made Simple (Japanese: よくわかる現代魔法, Hepburn: Yoku Wakaru Gendai Mahō; lit. "Comprehensible Modern-Day Magic") is a Japanese light novel series by, and the debut work of, Hiroshi Sakurazaka, with illustrations by Miki Miyashita. As of March 25, 2009, six volumes have been published by Shueisha under their Super Dash Bunko imprint. A new edition of the first light novel was released on April 25, 2008. A manga adaptation started serialization in the shōnen magazine Jump Square on August 4, 2008. An anime adaptation was announced in October 2008. A 12-episode anime adaptation began airing in Japan on the networks BS11, AT-X, and Bandai Channel between July and September 2009.

== Plot summary ==
The protagonist, Koyomi Morishita, is a short, clumsy, female high school freshman who is mercilessly teased except by her good friend Yumiko. Seeing a flyer about a school for magicians, Koyomi takes the enrollment exam and becomes a student of Misa Anehara, a powerful master magician. Modern magic is accomplished with the aid of computers by writing special programs for them. As magic is not as easy as it seems, initially Koyomi's talent seems to consist of making washbasins randomly fall out of the sky.

== Characters ==
Koyomi Morishita (森下 こよみ, Morishita Koyomi)
Voiced by: Ai Nonaka
A bumbling 15-year-old first year high school student who has the body of a child. Since she is only 146 cm (4 ft 9½ in) tall, she is often mistaken for an elementary school student when she is wearing her own clothes. She gets lousy grades, is not very athletic and doesn't really have anything about herself to brag about, so she decides to go to a magic school that she saw in a flyer in order to change herself. She has the unusual ability of being able to take any code (spell) and change it into a washbasin summoning code. This ability has gradually been improving.
Yumiko Cristina Ichinose (一ノ瀬・弓子・クリスティーナ, Ichinose Yumiko Kurisutīna)
Voiced by: Haruka Tomatsu
A natural-born 15-year-old mage, she has purple eyes and silver hair. She is quick-learned at magic, seeing a complex spell and repeating it perfectly, without practicing. She has a staff and a spell book left to her by her great-grandfather, and usually wears white. She was often teased at elementary school and stared at in public because of her doll-like appearance. Upon meeting Koyomi, they become good friends, but Yumiko often displays a somewhat of a tsundere-like personality towards her.
Misa Anehara (姉原 美鎖, Anehara Misa)
Voiced by: Nabatame Hitomi
She is one of the most powerful modern-magic users. She is a 25-year-old college student who is majoring in programming. She is able to make practical use of her abilities as a leading modern magic user. She has no qualms about using magic to manipulate the will of normal people and uses it to help people sell products. The flyer which Koyomi read was distributed by the magic school run by Misa's grandfather, and Misa becomes Koyomi's magic teacher because of this. She has a sweet and laid-back personality but lacks common sense. As a hobby, she likes to buy useless things such as banana hangers and curry roux meant for large establishments from the internet. Her mother died when she was young, so she raised her younger brother Soshiro.
Kaho Sakazaki (坂崎 嘉穂, Sakazaki Kaho)
Voiced by: Minako Kotobuki
The class representative of Koyomi's class, she is quiet and a model student. She is a quick learner, compared to Koyomi, of modern magic. Although she is fairly skilled, she cannot see demons, ghostscripts, or genies because she cannot detect magic.
Sōshirō Anehara (姉原 聡史郎, Anehara Sōshirō)
Voiced by: Shintaro Asanuma
The younger brother of Misa, he is more sensible and serious, compared to his sister. He is usually seen doing chores around the residence. He mostly scolds Misa because of her illogical actions, but he also deeply cares about her. Due to his sister constantly feeding him enchanted food at a young age, he has built an immunity to magic. As a result, he refuses to believe the existence of magic even after magic is shown to him.

== Media ==
=== Light novel ===
The light novel series is by Hiroshi Sakurazaka, with illustrations by Miki Miyashita. As of March 25, 2009, six volumes have been published by Shueisha under their Super Dash Bunko imprint. A new edition of the first light novel was released on April 25, 2008.

=== Manga ===
A manga adaptation started serialization in the shōnen magazine Jump Square on August 4, 2008.

=== Anime ===
An anime adaptation was announced in October 2008. On July 11, 2009, the anime began airing in Japan on the networks BS11, AT-X and Bandai Channel, while also simulcast worldwide via Crunchyroll. It ran for 12 episodes, ending on September 26, 2009. North American licensor Sentai Filmworks released the series on DVD in December 2011.

The opening theme of the anime series was "programming for non-fiction" by Natsuko Aso. The ending theme was "Made in WONDER" by Aki Misato.
