= Moriarty the Patriot =

Japanese manga series

- First tankōbon volume cover, featuring William James Moriarty

憂国のモリアーティ (Yūkoku no Moriāti)
- Genre: Crime; Mystery; Thriller
- Created by: Sir Arthur Conan Doyle
- Manga
- Written by: Ryosuke Takeuchi (Note: Takeuchi is credited exclusively with storyboards and layout.)
- Illustrated by: Hikaru Miyoshi
- Published by: Shueisha
- English publisher: NA: Viz Media
- Imprint: Jump Comics SQ.
- Magazine: Jump Square
- Original run: August 4, 2016 – present
- Volumes: 23
- Anime television series
- Directed by: Kazuya Nomura
- Written by: Gō Zappa; Taku Kishimoto
- Music by: Asami Tachibana
- Studio: Production I.G
- Licensed by: Crunchyroll (Note: In North America through Crunchyroll, LLC (formerly known as Funimation).); SA/SEA: Muse Communication
- Original network: Tokyo MX, BS11, MBS
- English network: US: Crunchyroll Channel
- Original run: October 11, 2020 – June 27, 2021
- Episodes: 24 + 2 OVAs
- Manga

Moriarty the Patriot: The Remains
- Written by: Yōsuke Saita
- Illustrated by: Hikaru Miyoshi
- Published by: Shueisha
- Imprint: Jump Comics SQ.
- Magazine: Jump Square
- Original run: March 3, 2023 – July 4, 2024
- Volumes: 3
- icon

Moriarty the Patriot (Japanese: 憂国のモリアーティ, Hepburn: Yūkoku no Moriāti) is a Japanese manga series with storyboards by Ryosuke Takeuchi and illustrated by Hikaru Miyoshi, based on Sir Arthur Conan Doyle's Sherlock Holmes series. It focuses on Holmes' nemesis, William James Moriarty. It has been serialized in Shueisha's shōnen manga magazine Jump Square since August 2016, with its chapters collected in 23 tankōbon volumes as of August 2026.

An anime television series adaptation produced by Production I.G aired from October 2020 to June 2021.

A manga adaptation of the novel adaptations by Yōsuke Saita, titled Moriarty the Patriot: The Remains, was serialized in Jump Square from March 2023 to July 2024, with its chapters collected in three volumes.

== Plot ==
In the late 19th century, the British Empire has become a global power. Due to the strict class stratification, the average citizen has little chance of successfully rising up to the top, where the despicable nobility rules over them all.

The first son of Earl Moriarty, Albert Moriarty finds two orphans, Louis and his unnamed brother, that share a common hatred for the corrupt British nobility and adopts them as his brothers. They scheme together to kill Albert's cruel biological brother William, burn down the family estate, and start a new life together using illegal means to destroy the class system, with Louis's elder brother taking William's name and identity.

While enacting an elaborate scheme to murder a noble who was hunting commoners, William encounters Sherlock Holmes, who deduces a third party was involved in the murder. This piques William's interest in Sherlock, leading him to test his abilities by framing Sherlock for murder.

Thus ensues a battle of wits as William relentlessly pursues a better world and Sherlock pursues the reason why he was chosen by the infamous Lord of Crime to play a part in his murders.

== Characters ==
William James Moriarty (ウィリアム・ジェームズ・モリアーティ, Uiriamu Jēmuzu Moriāti)
Voiced by: Soma Saito, Shizuka Ishigami (young) (Japanese); Aaron Dismuke, Emily Neves (young) (English)
The middle Moriarty brother and a crime consultant. He possesses great intelligence and uses it to come up with perfect crimes in hopes of ending the class system and reforming society. He helps victims of class-influenced crimes get their revenge by setting up a crime scene where their victims do the killing without leaving any evidence of their involvement behind. William was originally raised in an orphanage before being adopted by Albert and assumed the identity of the real William after murdering him.
Albert James Moriarty (アルバート・ジェームズ・モリアーティ, Arubāto Jēmuzu Moriāti)
Voiced by: Takuya Satō (Japanese); Chris Guerrero (English)
The oldest of the Moriarty brothers. He is the only member of the original Moriarty family of the brothers. He adopted William and Louis after witnessing how broken his real family is and came to believe in William's dreams of remaking society. He serves as a lieutenant colonel in the British army before retiring to head MI6 under Mycroft Holmes's watchful eye.
Louis James Moriarty (ルイス・ジェームズ・モリアーティ, Ruisu Jēmuzu Moriāti)
Voiced by: Chiaki Kobayashi, Nao Tōyama (young) (Japanese); Howard Wang, Laura Stahl (young) (English)
The youngest of the Moriarty brothers and William's younger biological brother. As a child, he suffered from an unknown illness until Albert's father was manipulated into getting him life-saving surgery. He is devoted to William, and eventually takes over the leadership roles of both his brothers'.
Sherlock Holmes (シャーロック・ホームズ, Shārokku Hōmuzu)
Voiced by: Makoto Furukawa (Japanese); Theo Devaney (English)
William's friend and rival. He works as a consulting detective who helps Scotland Yard and other clients with cases they cannot solve. William takes an interest in him after realizing Sherlock's brilliance during their first meeting and proceeds to "cast" him in the role of a hero in his plan to remake society, but Sherlock has no interest in being manipulated or left behind by the one person he feels understands him.
John H. Watson (ジョン・H・ワトソン, Jon H Watoson)
Voiced by: Yūki Ono (Japanese); Ryan Colt Levy (English)
Watson is a veteran who was a combat medic in the First Anglo-Afghan War as well as Sherlock's flatmate who helps him solve cases and chronicles them with heavy fictionalizations to suit his and Sherlock's purposes.
Fred Porlock (フレッド・ポーロック, Fureddo Pōrokku)
Voiced by: Yūto Uemura (Japanese); Caleb Yen (English)
A youthful associate of William's who is a master of disguise and martial arts, including the deadly use of knives and firearms. He acts as William's spy and information broker and rarely speaks unless delivering the information he has gathered. Despite his withdrawn personality, at heart he is quite gentle and kind, especially around children, and hates when they are the victims of crimes.
Sebastian Moran (セバスチャン・モラン, Sebasuchan Moran)
Voiced by: Satoshi Hino (Japanese); Christopher Wehkamp (English)
A veteran who began working for William after returning home from India, marked Killed in Action after the death of his entire squad, and promoted up to his rank as Colonel. He is an expert sniper and acts as William's soldier, bodyguard, and assassin. He has sworn his life to William.
Mycroft Holmes (マイクロフト・ホームズ, Maikurofuto Hōmuzu)
Voiced by: Hiroki Yasumoto (Japanese); J. Michael Tatum (English)
Sherlock's older brother and the director of the UK's War Office. He also serves as M's boss and Albert's close friend. He is very stoic but equally sentimental, though he hides this under layers of denial.
Irene Adler (アイリーン・アドラー, Airīn'adorā) / James Bonde (ジェームズ・ボンド, Jēmuzu Bondo)
Voiced by: Yoko Hikasa (Japanese); Natalie Van Sistine (English)
Adler befriends Sherlock Holmes briefly and then begins working alongside the Moriartys after being forced to fake her death, after which Adler takes on the identity of "James Bonde" relying on her skills as an actress, saying that she is performing "the role that Will and Al have given me."
Jack Renfield (ジャック・レンフィールド, Jakku Renfīrudo)
Voiced by: Naoya Uchida (Japanese); Bruce DuBose (English)
A old veteran, nicknamed "Jack the Ripper", he worked as the Rockwells' butler while the Moriarty brothers were young, after they were taken in by the Rockwells following the murder of the rest of the Moriarty family. He taught them how to fight, kill, and cook, and is rehired by them as adults.
Von Herder (フォン・ヘルダー, Fon Herudā)
Voiced by: Kohsuke Toriumi (Japanese); Brandon McInnis (English)
An expert mechanic from Germany despite his blindness, Herder serves as William's inventor and in MI6 as "Q", designing weapons and gadgets well ahead of their time. He is an excitable man who is easily frustrated and reacts strongly to teasing. Based on the mechanic of the same name who was briefly mentioned in "The Adventure of the Empty House" as the manufacturer of Moran's air rifle.
Zach Patterson (ザック・パターソン, Zakku Patāson)
Voiced by: Tokuyoshi Kawashima (Japanese); Anthony Bowling (English)
He is the chief of police in Scotland Yard, serving as a mole for Moriarty and keeping the police as corruption free as he can. Based on the inspector of the same name who was briefly mentioned in "The Final Problem" as the one who convicts Moriarty's gang.
Charles Augustus Milverton (チャールズ・オーガスタス・ミルヴァートン, Chyāruzu Ōgasutasu Mirubāton)
Voiced by: Kenji Nojima (Japanese); Kayleigh McKee (English)
A corrupt journalist, self-styled as the "King of Blackmail", who enjoys forcing people into despair and leading them to their own sin and ruin.
Billy the Kid (ビリー・ザ・キッド, Birī za kiddo)
A Pinkerton agent working for the US government. He rescues Sherlock and William following The Final Problem and brings them to New York City to recover and work alongside him.
Miss Moneypenny (ミス・マネーペニー, Misu ManēPenī)
She works as a secretary for MI6, while also being a close associate of the Moriartys. She is very attached to her colleagues, and shows her combat skills on multiple occasions.

== Production ==
Moriarty the Patriot began as a suggestion from Hikaru Miyoshi's editor to write about Sherlock Holmes after the end of Miyoshi's previous series, and Ryosuke Takeuchi joined after the characters of William and Sherlock had already been established. The focus of the series wound up on Professor Moriarty instead, and Takeuchi has said despite liking heroes as a child, he began to empathize with villains as he grew older.

Miyoshi chose to subvert expectations of Sherlock and Professor Moriarty's personalities and create a "gentleman" criminal and a "rough" detective in order to create a story that stood out in a sea of adaptations. Takeuchi commented that every adaptation has a different "flavor" of Holmes, and hoped that the reader could think of Moriarty the Patriot's version as one of the many flavors of Holmes created. William and Sherlock were intentionally designed to be very similar and also contrast each other as opposites as much as possible, in both physical design and behavior.

After the end of the first part of the series, Takeuchi posted a message of thanks to everyone involved in the project on his Twitter account, and updated his bio to indicate his involvement in the series was limited to the first part.

== Media ==
=== Manga ===
Moriarty the Patriot, storyboarded by Ryosuke Takeuchi and illustrated by Hikaru Miyoshi, began serialization in Shueisha's shōnen manga magazine Jump Square on August 4, 2016. The series ended its first part on December 2, 2022. As of August 2026, it has been collected in twenty-three tankōbon volumes. The manga is licensed in North America by Viz Media.

The second part began serialization in Jump Square on December 4, 2024.

A manga adaptation of the spin-off novel series, written by Yōsuke Saita, titled Moriarty the Patriot: The Remains, started in Jump Square on March 3, 2023, and finished on July 4, 2024, with its chapters collected in three volumes.

==== Volumes ====
| No. | Original release date | Original ISBN | English release date | English ISBN |
|---|---|---|---|---|
| 1 | November 4, 2016 | 978-4-08-880857-4 | October 6, 2020 | 978-1-9747-1715-6 |
| 2 | March 3, 2017 | 978-4-08-881031-7 | January 5, 2021 | 978-1-9747-1935-8 |
| 3 | July 4, 2017 | 978-4-08-881123-9 | April 6, 2021 | 978-1-9747-1936-5 |
| 4 | November 2, 2017 | 978-4-08-881166-6 | July 6, 2021 | 978-1-9747-1050-8 |
| 5 | March 2, 2018 | 978-4-08-881365-3 | October 5, 2021 | 978-1-9747-2084-2 |
| 6 | July 4, 2018 | 978-4-08-881424-7 | January 4, 2022 | 978-1-9747-2085-9 |
| 7 | November 2, 2018 | 978-4-08-881627-2 | April 5, 2022 | 978-1-9747-2086-6 |
| 8 | March 4, 2019 | 978-4-08-881766-8 | August 2, 2022 | 978-1-9747-2087-3 |
| 9 | July 4, 2019 | 978-4-08-881889-4 | October 4, 2022 | 978-1-9747-2088-0 |
| 10 | November 1, 2019 | 978-4-08-882109-2 | January 3, 2023 | 978-1-9747-2089-7 |
| 11 | March 4, 2020 | 978-4-08-882233-4 | April 4, 2023 | 978-1-9747-2795-7 |
| 12 | July 3, 2020 | 978-4-08-882360-7 | July 4, 2023 | 978-1-9747-3749-9 |
| 13 | November 4, 2020 | 978-4-08-882482-6 | October 3, 2023 | 978-1-9747-2797-1 |
| 14 | April 2, 2021 | 978-4-08-882601-1 | January 2, 2024 | 978-1-9747-2798-8 |
| 15 | August 4, 2021 | 978-4-08-882741-4 | April 2, 2024 | 978-1-9747-3452-8 |
| 16 | December 3, 2021 | 978-4-08-882855-8 | July 2, 2024 | 978-1-9747-3453-5 |
| 17 | April 4, 2022 | 978-4-08-883086-5 | October 1, 2024 | 978-1-9747-3654-6 |
| 18 | August 4, 2022 | 978-4-08-883203-6 | January 7, 2025 | 978-1-9747-5160-0 |
| 19 | February 3, 2023 | 978-4-08-883312-5 | April 1, 2025 | 978-1-9747-5232-4 |
| 20 | May 2, 2025 | 978-4-08-884520-3 | July 21, 2026 | 978-1-9747-6577-5 |
| 21 | November 4, 2025 | 978-4-08-884711-5 | December 8, 2026 | 978-1-9747-6847-9 |
| 22 | March 4, 2026 | 978-4-08-884879-2 | — | — |
| 23 | August 4, 2026 | 978-4-08-885151-8 | — | — |

==== The Remains ====
| No. | Japanese release date | Japanese ISBN |
|---|---|---|
| 1 | August 4, 2023 | 978-4-08-883573-0 |
| 2 | February 2, 2024 | 978-4-08-883831-1 |
| 3 | August 2, 2024 | 978-4-08-884089-5 |

=== Musicals ===
A stage musical adaptation, titled Musical "Moriarty the Patriot" (ミュージカル『憂国のモリアーティ』, Myūjikaru "Yūkoku no Moriāti"), shortened as "Morimyu" (モリミュ), was first announced in December 2018. The stage musical originally consisted of five numbered productions, referred to as "Op." (opus), followed by an anniversary concert and "Reprise" productions.

All installments have been directed by Hideyuki Nishimori, with Tadasuke serving as the composer. The main roles of William James Moriarty and Sherlock Holmes have consistently been portrayed by Shogo Suzuki and Ryō Hirano, respectively, throughout the series, whereas other cast members have varied over time. Key cast members for the original runs included Ikkei Yamamoto as Louis James Moriarty, Hidetoshi Kubota as Albert James Moriarty, Yūki Izawa as Sebastian Moran, Ryotaro Akazawa (Op. 1–3) and Ryōki Nagae (Op. 4 and 5) as Fred Porlock, Seshiru Daigo as James Bonde, Kenta Kamakari as John H. Watson, Kanon Nanaki as Ms. Hudson, and Shun Takagi as George Lestrade.

"Reprise" productions were reimagined versions of previous installments. A Study in Scarlet: Reprise featured a dual-team system consisting of the "Op." and "Reprise" teams. The performed productions include:

1. Op. 1 (May 10–26, 2019)
2. Op. 2: The British Empire's Scandal (大英帝国の醜聞, Daiei Teikoku no Shūbun) (July 31 – August 16, 2020)
3. Op. 3: The Phantom of Whitechapel (ホワイトチャペルの亡霊, Howaito Chaperu no Bōrei) (August 5–22, 2021)
4. Op. 4: The Two Criminals (犯人は二人, Han'nin wa Futari) (January 27 – February 12, 2023)
5. Op. 5: The Final Problem (最後の事件, Saigo no Jiken) (August 24 – September 10, 2023)
6. Anniversary concert (July 11–15, 2024)
7. The British Empire's Scandal: Reprise (大英帝国の醜聞 Reprise, Daiei Teikoku no Shūbun Ripurīzu) (May 16 – June 8, 2025)
8. A Study in Scarlet: Reprise (緋色の研究 Reprise, Hiiro no Kenkyū Ripurīzu) (June 27 – July 19, 2026)

=== Stage plays ===
The stage play adaptation, Stage "Moriarty the Patriot" (舞台「憂国のモリアーティ」, Butai "Yūkoku no Moriāti"), was first announced in July 2019. It consisted of two parts, with the first one premiering on January 10, 2020, while the second one premiered on July 23, 2021. It was directed by Daisuke Nishida. The stage play starred Yoshihiko Aramaki as William James Moriarty and Ryo Kitamura as Sherlock Holmes. It loosely followed the story with an altered order of events.

=== Anime ===
An anime television series adaptation was announced at the Jump Festa '20 event on December 22, 2019. The series was directed by Kazuya Nomura at Production I.G, with Tooru Ookubo designing the characters and serving as chief animation director. Gō Zappa and Taku Kishimoto were in charge of scripts, and Asami Tachibana composed the music. This was the first time that Nomura served as the director of an anime adaptation of a manga series.

While the first episode was pre-screened on September 21, 2020, the first half of the series officially aired from October 11 to December 20, 2020, on Tokyo MX, BS11, and MBS. The first opening theme, "Dying Wish", was performed by Tasuku Hatanaka, while the first ending theme, "Alpha", was performed by Stereo Dive Foundation. The series ran for 24 episodes, with the second half of 13 episodes airing from April 4 to June 27, 2021. The second opening theme, "Twisted Hearts", was performed by Hatanaka, while the second ending theme, "Omega", was performed by Stereo Dive Foundation.

Muse Communication has licensed the anime in Southeast Asia and South Asia, which was streamed on its Muse Asia YouTube channel. Funimation also acquired the series to stream on its website in North America and the British Isles. On August 13, 2021, Funimation announced the series would receive an English dub, which premiered on August 15. Following the announcement that Funimation would be unified and merged under the Crunchyroll brand, the series became available on Crunchyroll. Both parts were released on two Blu-ray Disc sets each one on July 19 and November 1, 2022, respectively.

A two-episode original video animation (OVA) project was announced. It was released on April 27, 2022.

==== Episodes ====
| No. | Title (Note: All English titles are taken from Funimation.) | Directed by | Written by | Storyboarded by | Original release date | Ref. |
|---|---|---|---|---|---|---|
Part 1
| 1 | "The Earl's Crime"; Transliteration: "Hakushaku no Hanzai" (Japanese: 伯爵の犯罪) | Kazuya Nomura | Gō Zappa | Kazuya Nomura | October 11, 2020 (Note: It was pre-screened on September 21, 2020.) | |
William James Moriarty, future nemesis of Sherlock Holmes, lives in late 19th century London. William learns of a serial killer who has murdered seven young boys and immediately deduces from their fathers' occupations the killer is a nobleman who encountered the boys at their fathers' shops, except for one boy who was homeless. After interviewing the homeless boy's friend, William deduces the killer must have first seen the boy from a window of the Gastros fine dining club. William's brother, Albert, uses his connections to get William inside the club. William is immediately suspicious of Lord Argleton, a founding member. William notices Argleton's attire was bought from the boys' fathers. After hinting to Argleton he knows about his obsession with young boys, Argleton sends a thug after William, who is easily taken out by William's other brother, Louis. Later, William provides a restrained Argleton to his client, a father of one of the boys, for revenge, revealing that William secretly works as a crime consultant, alongside his brothers Albert and Louis, to help their clients commit crimes. With the police and general public unaware of Argleton's death and disappearance, William declares it another perfect crime.
| 2 | "The Scarlet Eyes Act 1"; Transliteration: "Hiiro no Hitomi Daiichimaku" (Japanese: 緋色の瞳 第一幕) | Daiki Katō | Gō Zappa | Kazuya Nomura | October 18, 2020 | |
As a young child, William frequently offered advice from his vast memory palace to anyone he met. After returning home with Albert, it is revealed William and Louis were actually orphaned brothers adopted into the Moriarty family and that William is not his real name. The real William was actually the second eldest Moriarty son who mistreated his two adopted brothers while only Albert showed them any kindness. It is revealed Albert had routinely visited Louis and fake William's orphanage to provide charity and when Albert's father was manipulated into adopting an orphan as an act of charity, Albert considered having fake William adopted due to his intellect, especially after learning fake William had already begun advising people how to strike back against abusive nobles and get away with it. After finding out that the real William had deliberately injured a maid, he went to fake William, who explained he planned to eventually overthrow the old class system and replace it with a society that values every citizen equally. Shortly afterwards, the Moriarty home burned to the ground, killing everybody except for Albert, Louis and the new William.
| 3 | "The Scarlet Eyes Act 2"; Transliteration: "Hiiro no Hitomi Dainimaku" (Japanese: 緋色の瞳 第二幕) | Shingo Uchida | Gō Zappa | Kazuya Nomura | October 25, 2020 | |
Several days before the fire, Albert decided to have fake William and Louis adopted against the wishes of his mother. Albert's father further infuriated her when he paid for Louis' surgery to impress another woman. The real William attempted to bully the brothers, but was unsuccessful. While listening to his family continually talk down about commoners, Albert became convinced fake William was right about the class system, so he decided to help fake William any way he could. That night, the real William attempted to hide stolen silverware in fake William's room to frame him. Fake William had guessed he would attempt this and caught the real William in the act before allowing Albert to stab the real William as a sign of his commitment. Assured of Albert's loyalty, fake William posed the real William in his bed to make it seem he was dead. He then set off a massive gas explosion in the mansion, killing the real William and Albert's parents. As the new head of the Moriarty family, Albert claimed to the authorities fake William was the real William and Louis was their adopted brother.
| 4 | "A Rare Breed"; Transliteration: "Kishōna Tane" (Japanese: 希少な種) | Michiru Itabisashi | Gō Zappa | Sayo Aoi | November 1, 2020 | |
In the past, the Viscount of Belfor rejected Burton and his wife Michelle's request to see his doctor for their ill son due to Burton being his gardener. As a result, the son died. In the present, William arrives in Durham where he learns about Michelle. When he catches up with Louis, he receives a dinner invitation from the viscount. Later that night, the Moriarty brothers find out the viscount has a heart condition he treats with quinine and a conservatory. The viscount decides to host a tea party in the conservatory. When Burton arrives at his home, it is revealed Michelle has not gotten over their son's death. The next night, William secretly meets Burton at a pub. At the tea party, the viscount enjoys some grapefruit marmalade when Michelle attempts to stab him. Burton stops her, but the viscount begins to feel faint. Before he dies, William reveals to the viscount that grapefruit can neutralize quinine and will disguise his death as natural causes. He also reveals he helped Burton set up the murder as revenge for his dead son. Afterwards, it is revealed that Albert has helped Burton get a job at Queen Mary's Botanical Garden.
| 5 | "The Dancers on the Bridge"; Transliteration: "Hashi no Ue no Odoriko" (Japanese: 橋の上の踊り子) | Asami Nakatani | Gō Zappa | Asami Nakatani | November 8, 2020 | |
One of William's noble students, Lucian Atwood, goes missing. William learns Lucian is dating a waitress named Frida. Dudley Bale, an administrative assistant for the university, advises William to ignore the situation. William learns from Frida's employer that Lucian had proposed marriage, despite Frida being a commoner, and she became pregnant. A man had later visited Frida and claimed Lucian no longer wanted to marry her, so Frida threw herself off a bridge and drowned. It is revealed that Dudley staged Frida's murder as a suicide then drugged and imprisoned Lucian in a brothel. William contacts two men, Sebastian Moran and Fred Porlock. Fred retrieves Lucian and places him near the bridge. Dudley rushes to retrieve Lucian only for Frida to rise from the river, terrifying Dudley into confessing to drugging Frida. William arrives and reveals Frida is Fred in disguise. He also reveals Dudley owns several brothels and opium dens and uses his noble status to lure students into them so he can blackmail their families. Moran fires several sniper shots at Dudley's feet, causing him to jump backwards and fall into the river where he drowns. A distraught Lucian has Frida buried in a noble cemetery.
| 6 | "The 'Noahtic' Act 1"; Transliteration: "Noatikku Gōjiken Daiichimaku" (Japanese: ノアティック号事件 第一幕) | Kazuki Yokoyama | Gō Zappa | Kazuki Yokoyama | November 15, 2020 | |
A commoner is chased down by a hunter and his dogs before being shot. The ocean liner Noahtic begins its maiden voyage and Count Blitz Enders, an openly arrogant noble, heavily criticizes that commoners are allowed aboard. Days previously, William shared his plan to slowly remake society by plunging London into an era of crime, all while committing murders designed to educate commoners in exactly how the nobility have been abusing them, starting with Blitz. Onboard, Moran pays Thomas Michaelson, a rapist and murderer, to provoke Blitz, hoping he will overreact against Thomas, reasoning that the death of a man like him can be put to good use. Fred further enrages Blitz by delivering a telegram claiming his home burned down and one of his coal mines closed after an industrial accident. William meets a man who instantly deduces that he is a mathematician, so William responds by deducing the man's hobbies, amusing the man who leaves without introducing himself. Blitz, revealed to be the hunter who hunts commoners for fun, lures Thomas to his cabin and murders him. With his plan a success, William enters Blitz's cabin, pretending to catch him in the act.
| 7 | "The 'Noahtic' Act 2"; Transliteration: "Noatikku Gōjiken Dainimaku" (Japanese: ノアティック号事件 第二幕) | Katsuya Shigehara | Gō Zappa | Katsuya Shigehara | November 22, 2020 | |
William pretends to believe Blitz's lie that he killed Thomas in self-defense and offers to cover up the crime. Together, they throw Thomas into the sea, though Fred and Moran secretly retrieve the body. The next night, during an onboard ballet, William approaches Blitz and reveals that Thomas is somehow alive. Blitz chases after Thomas through the ship, really Fred in disguise, intending to kill him again, only to be confronted with Thomas' corpse. Deciding to make sure he is dead, Blitz begins stabbing the body. When he is publicly revealed as a murderer, Blitz is disarmed by the man William met earlier, who immediately deduces something strange about Thomas' corpse. Blitz climbs the ship's mast to escape, but Moran shoots at him with a silenced rifle, causing him to fall to his death. William influences Parliament to investigate Blitz's hunting grounds so that when his victims' bodies are discovered, there will be public outrage among the commoners. He also reveals to his friends he has concerns about the man from the ship, who had approached him to reveal his deductions that the entire murder was staged, and had finally introduced himself as Sherlock Holmes.
| 8 | "A Study in 'S' Act 1"; Transliteration: "Shārokku Hōmuzu no Kenkyū Daiichimaku" (Japanese: シャーロック・ホームズの研究 第一幕) | Shintarō Itoga | Gō Zappa | Tomomi Kamiya | November 29, 2020 | |
Holmes gets in trouble with his landlady Mrs. Hudson for not paying his rent. Holmes' friend, Dr. Stamford, suggests Holmes get a flatmate and sends Dr. John Watson, whom Holmes deduces is a retired army doctor. Mrs. Hudson is impressed enough to allow Watson to become Holmes' flatmate. Inspector Lestrade of Scotland Yard arrives and arrests Holmes for suspicion of murdering Count Drebber who had written Holmes name in his own blood before he died. Assistant Inspector Gregson, who despises Holmes, collects evidence despite Holmes pointing out that it could easily be faked. Lestrade decides to trust Holmes and takes him and Watson to the crime scene where Holmes secretly steals a piece of evidence, then with Watson's assistance, proves Drebber would have died too quickly to write his name and that the name was clearly written by a very large man unskilled at shooting guns, probably being controlled by an intelligent mastermind. Holmes immediately recognizes the handiwork of the mastermind behind the Noahtic. Excited at the prospect of a real challenge, Holmes secretly passes a note to Watson. Elsewhere, it is revealed William orchestrated Drebber's murder, having helped a man dying of a terminal illness get revenge in exchange for leaving evidence that would test Holmes' deductive abilities.
| 9 | "A Study in 'S' Act 2"; Transliteration: "Shārokku Hōmuzu no Kenkyū Dainimaku" (Japanese: シャーロック・ホームズの研究 第二幕) | Daiki Katō | Gō Zappa | Tomomi Kamiya | December 6, 2020 | |
Holmes convinces Lestrade to let him escape, promising Lestrade the credit when he solves Drebber's murder. Holmes reveals to Watson the evidence he stole, a wedding ring engraved with the name Lucy. To tempt the mastermind, Holmes places a newspaper advert seeking the ring's owner. In response, William sends Fred disguised as an old woman. Fred claims the ring then escapes before Holmes can catch him. Holmes reveals to Watson inside a hansom cab he solved Drebber's murder. Drebber was suspected of raping lower class women then bribing them. One woman, Lucy, refused and was murdered; meaning Drebber's murderer was Lucy's husband, a large man named Jefferson Hope, the driver of the hansom cab. Holmes explains he has a network of homeless children, the Baker Street Irregulars, who located Jefferson based on Holmes' description of his large body. Jefferson reveals his illness will kill him soon anyway and offers Holmes a deal: if Holmes shoots him, a nearby Fred will reveal their master's identity. However, Holmes refuses, preferring to deduce his identity on his own and turns Jefferson in to Lestrade. Meanwhile, as he did not shoot Jefferson, William deems Holmes worthy to be his nemesis.
| 10 | "The Two Detectives Act 1"; Transliteration: "Futari no Tantei Daiichimaku" (Japanese: 二人の探偵 第一幕) | Shintarō Itoga | Gō Zappa | Naoki Arakawa | December 13, 2020 | |
Holmes has a nightmare where he willingly kills Jefferson. He later admits to Watson that despite his fame thanks to the Drebber case, he prefers to solve a bigger mystery. While he is alone, Holmes wonders whether or not he should have accepted Jefferson's offer. He then fires a gun which draws Mrs. Hudson, Watson, and Lestrade's attention. When Lestrade mentions that the Viscount of Redshire died on a lakefront in York, Holmes, Watson, and Lestrade go there to investigate. Following the investigation, Holmes and Watson have an argument. In the dining car, Holmes spots William and Louis. When he approaches them, he claims that he has figured out that William is the mastermind behind the aristocrat murders. While Louis is worried that Holmes knows the truth, William calls Holmes' bluff, stating that he would have to prove it. Later, as Lestrade introduces himself to the Moriarty brothers, they are informed there is a dead body. After Holmes proposes a contest to William to see who can solve the case first, Watson shows up while covered in blood.
| 11 | "The Two Detectives Act 2"; Transliteration: "Futari no Tantei Dainimaku" (Japanese: 二人の探偵 第二幕) | Michiru Itabisashi | Gō Zappa | Naoki Arakawa | December 20, 2020 | |
Railway police arrest Watson despite his protest the blood came from a man he bumped into near the toilets. Holmes and William determine the victim, Trevor Redwood, is a jeweler who was inadvertently killed when he woke up in the middle of a robbery after being drugged. With Holmes following the physical evidence, William constructs a psychological profile of the killer. Following their methods, they both determine the killer is a porter who is unable to dispose of his bloody uniform. Holmes discovers blood on porter Eddie Hawthorn, but Hawthorn claims the blood is his own from an earlier accident. William identifies additional blood evidence Holmes missed, which causes Hawthorn to confess. William reveals to Louis he planted the extra evidence, reasoning that while Holmes would have eventually found Hawthorn guilty, his illegal methods got results much faster. With Holmes defeated by William, he reluctantly asks for Watson's continued assistance in solving his cases. Meanwhile, Holmes' brother, Mycroft, meets a young Queen Victoria about missing documents relating to one of Britain's greatest national secrets and is given royal permission to do whatever is necessary to retrieve them.
Part 2
| 12 | "A Scandal in the British Empire Act 1"; Transliteration: "Daiei Teikoku no Shūbun Daiichimaku" (Japanese: 大英帝国の醜聞 第一幕) | Yoshitaka Nagaoka | Taku Kishimoto | Hirotaka Mori | April 4, 2021 (Note: Funimation pre-screened this episode on March 28, 2021.) | |
Mycroft visits Holmes and warns him to beware of women. Holmes then reveals to Watson that Mycroft runs the British government. Mycroft summons Albert Moriarty, who despite his links to William, is still a lieutenant colonel. He orders him to retrieve secret papers from Irene Adler, a former actress with links to nobility and the criminal underworld. He also orders him to kill her. William is interested Adler stole such documents, but has made no blackmail demands. Holmes and Watson meet their latest client, King Wilhelm of Bohemia. Adler possesses a photograph of his infidelity and is threatening to send it to his fiancé, so he offers Holmes £1000 to retrieve it. As the king leaves, he is revealed to be Adler in disguise. Holmes tricks his way into Adler's home but Adler, who knew Holmes was coming, hides the photograph and burns down her home, announcing she will now be living with Holmes. William is impressed that Adler has publicly linked herself to Holmes. Holmes is surprised when Adler, a supposed ruthless criminal, puts herself at risk to save a young girl from noble bullies. Adler later discovers someone managed to place a letter inside her jacket.
| 13 | "A Scandal in the British Empire Act 2"; Transliteration: "Daiei Teikoku no Shūbun Dainimaku" (Japanese: 大英帝国の醜聞 第二幕) | Katsuya Shigehara | Taku Kishimoto | Hirotaka Endō | April 11, 2021 | |
Albert arranges a masquerade ball based on rumors of a Lord of Crime. Adler attends the ball to see Albert. He offers to spare her life in exchange for what is in the documents, so Adler reveals a scandal concerning the very British Empire itself. Albert points out one of the guests, Baron Ronald Rollinson, burned down a theatre for insurance money, killing everyone inside. Rollinson abruptly dies of poison and Adler realizes Albert is involved with the Lord of Crime. Albert explains his plan to change society and demands the documents. Adler returns to Holmes' home, which suddenly explodes. Holmes and Watson claim a bomber was looking for Adler, tricking her into retrieving the documents, revealing the British government secretly started the French Revolution. Albert shares this with William who decides they must have the documents. Adler explains she had been trying to change society, so she stole the documents in order to blackmail the monarchy. Holmes gives the documents to Adler to return to the government. He then reveals to Watson that he deduced Adler is actually planning to give them to the Lord of Crime and plans to use her to finally learn his identity.
| 14 | "A Scandal in the British Empire Act 3"; Transliteration: "Daiei Teikoku no Shūbun Daisanmaku" (Japanese: 大英帝国の醜聞 第三幕) | Haruo Okuno | Taku Kishimoto | Haruo Okuno | April 18, 2021 | |
Adler meets Albert with his face hidden to hand over the documents, but Holmes appears, having deduced only the Lord of Crime could keep Adler safe from the government and so offers the documents if he keeps her alive. Albert agrees and gives Holmes an envelope with the name James Moriaty inside as an insurance policy if Holmes ever suspects Adler is dead. Albert takes Adler to William where she realizes the Lord of Crime is an organization. Mycroft meets with Albert, who admits he is fascinated that Maximilien Robespierre was secretly a British agent. Due to the scandalous nature of the documents, Mycroft is forced to let William continue reforming society. William suspects Mycroft's motives and Mycroft admits that he is also avoiding personal humiliation as Robespierre's real name was actually Sherrinford Holmes, his ancestor. Adler is later found dead, but Holmes had already been sent a sign by Adler and thus knows she had faked her death, so he burns the envelope without looking at the name inside. It is shown that under William's guidance, Adler has assumed a new identity as a man named James Bonde.
| 15 | "The Phantom of Whitechapel Act 1"; Transliteration: "Howaito Chaperu no Bōrei Daiichimaku" (Japanese: ホワイトチャペルの亡霊 第一幕) | Daiki Katō | Fūka Ishii | Kazuya Nomura; Daiki Katō | April 25, 2021 | |
Jack the Ripper begins murdering prostitutes in Whitechapel. Moran refuses to accept Bonde's male identity until he proves useful. William sends them to access a safe deposit box, just as thieves begin robbing the bank. When Bonde hesitates, Moran points out Bonde's lack of initiative and demands Bonde quickly concoct a plan to escape with the box and deal with the thieves without drawing the attention of Holmes. Bonde neutralizes the thieves and sets up a policeman as the hero. Returning home, they find an old man, Jack Renfield, the British army's most skilled close quarters assassin who taught both Moran and the Moriarty brothers how to fight and kill. Codenamed Jack the Ripper, he retrieves his knives from the deposit box and reveals the Whitechapel serial killer has stolen his codename and asks William to help stop the killer and take back his codename. Whitechapel becomes a warzone between the residents, who formed a Vigilance Committee to hunt the killer, and the police, who are more interested in disbanding the committee than catching the killer. William deduces that, far from being a lone psychotic killer, they are probably dealing with a group of killers with a specific goal.
| 16 | "The Phantom of Whitechapel Act 2"; Transliteration: "Howaito Chaperu no Bōrei Dainimaku" (Japanese: ホワイトチャペルの亡霊 第二幕) | Kazuki Yokoyama | Hisashi Kobayashi | Kazuki Yokoyama | May 2, 2021 | |
Lestrade asks Holmes to identify Jack the Ripper, but Holmes refuses. William believes Jack the Ripper is actually a group promoting conflict between the Vigilance Committee and the police. William has Jack expose himself as Jack the Ripper in public, galvanizing the residents and police to work together while pressuring the real killers to expose themselves. Jack lets the mob chase him around Whitechapel, but eventually the police decide to simply kill him with a Gatling gun. Moran and Bonde save Jack with a shot down the Gatling's rotating barrel, causing it to explode. Exhausted, Jack swaps clothes with Fred, who continues the chase so Jack can recover. The real killers expose themselves, claiming they want to remake society as well, but William rejects their methods and kills them, leaving the evidence for Holmes, curious to see if he will either expose or hide the truth. William is observed by Charles Augustus Milverton, the true mastermind behind Jack the Ripper, who now considers William a threat. Holmes deduces the truth and is forced to admit to himself that the Jack the Ripper murders must forever remain unsolved to keep Britain safe.
| 17 | "The Riot in New Scotland Yard"; Transliteration: "Sukottorando Yādo Kyōsō Kyoku" (Japanese: スコットランドヤード狂騒曲) | Tazumi Mukaiyama | Nagiko Ohara | Takaaki Ishiyama | May 9, 2021 | |
To salvage his own reputation, Chief Inspector Arterton has a doctor framed as Jack the Ripper. Mycroft contacts Albert in the hope the Lord of Crime can help the doctor. Lestrade informs his co-worker, Inspector Paterson, that he suspects Arterton planted evidence. Paterson suggests finding Arterton's financial ledger. Lestrade decides to ask Holmes for assistance while Paterson secretly meets with Bonde. Arterton denies the doctor access to his lawyer until he can fake his confession. Bonde accesses the station by getting arrested as a drunk. Meanwhile, Holmes is conflicted between wanting to learn the Lord of Crime's identity and helping the doctor. Lestrade and Holmes almost manage to obtain the ledger when they are caught by Arterton. Lestrade finally accuses Arterton of corruption and is himself arrested. Bonde finds and passes the ledger to Paterson in the chaos, who gives it to Lestrade, claiming he found it in Arterton's office. Lestrade and the doctor are both freed while Arterton is arrested and Paterson is promoted to Chief Inspector. While Holmes is glad justice was served, he is conflicted by the Lord of Crime's methods. William is pleased he now has a useful ally in the new Chief Inspector.
| 18 | "The Merchant of London"; Transliteration: "Rondon no Shōnin" (Japanese: ロンドンの証人) | Asami Nakatani | Yūki Takabayashi | Asami Nakatani | May 16, 2021 | |
As a child, William noticed money missing from the orphanage. The headmistress revealed Lord Baxter conned her into handing over the funds. William confronted Baxter and offered to repay Baxter's debt. Afterwards, William revealed to Louis the contract he made Baxter sign allowed him to remove a pound of flesh from Baxter's body if he did not repay. When the case went to court, Baxter claimed he had no assets to repay. William thus claimed his right to remove his flesh until Baxter's lawyer claimed William was not entitled to it. William called a witness, a waiter from Baxter's favorite restaurant, who revealed blood counts towards how Baxter's favorite steak was prepared. Baxter panicked and admitted he had a secret fortune, which William took and donated to the orphanage in exchange for not taking his flesh. In the present, Milverton deduces from the court record that William was the orphan. William, having left the record intact as a test for anyone investigating his past, realizes Milverton, the owner of a newspaper empire, is now his enemy and orders his allies to begin plans to kill him before he exposes their identities and crimes.
| 19 | "The White Knight of London Act 1"; Transliteration: "Rondon no Kishi Daiichimaku" (Japanese: ロンドンの騎士 第一幕) | Naoki Murata | Yūki Takabayashi | Kazuya Nomura | May 23, 2021 | |
London's newest MP, Lord Whitely, gains popularity by trying to pass a law giving the vote to the working class. Whitely survives a bombing and William suspects another MP hired the bomber yet hopes Whitely can legitimately bring about the equal society William dreams of. The bomber is later found dead in his police cell. Whitely decides to lead the murder investigation just in case the murderer was a member of Scotland Yard. Milverton is hired by several MPs to deal with Whitely. At the opening of a new public park, the Lords who oppose Whitely publicly blame him for delays in construction. Whitely surprises everyone by admitting it and apologizing, later revealing the delays were to make sure the park was safely built for wheelchair users like his brother Sam and does not care how unpopular the delays made him. Overhearing this, Albert provides Whitely with evidence the Lords hired the bomber and suggests he use it as blackmail material to pass his law. Later, the corrupt policeman who murdered the bomber is himself killed by a giant with monstrous strength, who receives a message from Milverton his next victim is to be Sam.
| 20 | "The White Knight of London Act 2"; Transliteration: "Rondon no Kishi Dainimaku" (Japanese: ロンドンの騎士 第二幕) | Katsuya Shigehara; Chihiro Kumano | Taku Kishimoto | Kazuya Nomura | May 30, 2021 | |
Whitely shows Milverton his blackmail evidence and demands the Lords pass his law, so Milverton pretends to agree. Fred spots an intruder in Whitely's home, but is attacked by the giant and his knife wielding partner. Whitely returns home and finds Sam and his servants murdered by Sturridge, one of Paterson's inspectors, who confesses that he was coerced due to his family's kidnapping. Whitely then murders Sturridge just as Milverton planned. Meanwhile, Fred is saved by Louis so the attackers flee, but tell Louis their boss wants to meet William. Later, when Whitely confesses to Albert, William explains that if the murder is ever revealed, Whitely's reputation will be ruined, but his death can still be of benefit. During a press conference, Whitely rededicates himself to fighting for equality in memory of Sam before he allows William to assassinate him. William claims that as the Lord of Crime, he intends to destroy society and he preserves Whitely's reputation by taking credit for the murders. Paterson suspects why the Lord of Crime chose to assassinate Whitely, but keeps it to himself, deciding the Lord of Crime might be the necessary evil required to save society.
| 21 | "The Sign of Mary"; Transliteration: "Yottsu no Shomei" (Japanese: 四つの署名) | Daiki Katō | Taku Kishimoto | Kazuya Nomura | June 6, 2021 | |
Watson introduces Holmes to his fiancée Mary Morstan, who asks Holmes to investigate the disappearance of her father, Arthur, the death of his friend, Major Sholto, and why someone keeps sending her valuable pearls. Holmes suspects Mary is hiding something. Visiting Sholto's estate, Holmes finds Sholto's son Bartholomew dead. Bartholomew's twin, Thaddeus, reveals Sholto confessed on his deathbed that he killed Arthur after they stole the Treasure of Agra in India. He made them swear to give Mary the treasure, but they could not find it so they began sending her pearls instead. They eventually located the treasure and the names Jonathon Small and Abdullah Tonga. Holmes deduces Small and Tonga helped steal the treasure, but were cheated of their share and killed Bartholomew to get it. Holmes tracks them on a boat; Tonga is shot by Watson and Small dumps the treasure in the river rather than surrendering it, ending any threat to Mary's life. Nonetheless, Mary is devastated by the treasure's loss, so Holmes deduces Mary is being blackmailed. Mary confesses that someone threatened her wedding to Watson unless she handed over the treasure, and Holmes deduces that Milverton is the culprit.
| 22 | "The Two Criminals"; Transliteration: "Hannin wa Futari" (Japanese: 犯人は二人) | Naoki Murata | Taku Kishimoto | Takaaki Ishiyama; Kazuya Nomura | June 13, 2021 | |
Milverton arrives at Holmes' home, proves he has evidence to have Mary sent to prison, and demands Holmes retrieve the treasure. However, Holmes plans to break into Milverton's Brighton villa to destroy his blackmail material. At the villa, Holmes and Watson hear gunshots. Watson goes to fetch police while Holmes breaks in and confronts Milverton, who reveals he manipulated Holmes into coming, and has likewise manipulated William into being there, who he reveals to Holmes is the Lord of Crime. He then reveals that he has arranged for William's identity to be released in his newspaper unless he allows Holmes to arrest him. However, Holmes, having suspected William's identity since the Noahtic and having deduced Milverton never kept the evidence against Mary, turns on Milverton and shoots him. Holmes allows William to leave, but promises to catch him one day before setting the villa on fire. Watson and the police arrive; Holmes confesses he murdered Milverton and is arrested, but assures Watson the evidence against Mary is destroyed. William reveals to Louis his surprise that Holmes became a murderer so easily and is now sure that Holmes will be looking to kill him too.
| 23 | "The Final Problem Act 1"; Transliteration: "Saigo no Jiken Daiichimaku" (Japanese: 最後の事件 第一幕) | Haruo Okuno | Taku Kishimoto | Kazuya Nomura | June 20, 2021 | |
William begins preparing the final problem for Holmes. Mycroft informs Holmes that since Milverton's body fell into the ocean, there is no proof of murder. Watson is furious Holmes became a murderer just so he could get married. William publicly admits to being the Lord of Crime and begins killing nobles almost at random. His companions suspect William intends to die, with William admitting his death will be repentance for his crimes. Fred conspires with Louis to keep William alive, even if it ruins the final problem. William kills a noble in front of his children, concerning Moran that William allowed himself to be seen committing a murder. Holmes uncovers William's past and deduces he and his brothers are the Lord of Crime together. Holmes apologizes to Watson before attending a secret meeting with the Queen. Holmes is certain the future of the country depends on him and William. Fred and Louis meet Holmes and ask him to spare William, but Holmes admits he always intended to save William as he sees him as a friend. William later appears in Holmes' home and asks him to help bring their story to its conclusion.
| 24 | "The Final Problem Act 2"; Transliteration: "Saigo no Jiken Dainimaku" (Japanese: 最後の事件 第二幕) | Kazuya Nomura | Taku Kishimoto | Kazuya Nomura | June 27, 2021 | |
William provides Holmes the location of the final problem. Meanwhile, Albert and Moran burn down buildings around London. Jack hands Holmes a letter revealing why they are nemeses. With the only place to draw water being located at riverfront properties, Moran gives an impassioned speech, shaming the nobles into helping extinguish the fires. Holmes confronts William atop Tower Bridge. William then attacks Holmes as a stunt before he attempts to jump off the bridge. Holmes begs him to live, but William jumps anyway and is shocked when Holmes jumps after him. Three months later, William and Holmes remain missing. Nobles and commoners work together to rebuild London. Watson publishes a book supporting William's wishes by painting him as the most evil criminal Holmes ever faced. Mycroft reveals Holmes made a deal with the Queen to abolish the House of Lords' superiority. Albert accepts responsibility for William's crimes and is arrested. Moran, Fred, and Jack move on with their lives. Louis is sentenced to spend his life serving Britain and is put in charge of a secret organization, answerable only to the Queen, called MI6. Later, it is shown that Holmes survived and located William in Switzerland.

== Reception ==
Writer Haruyuki Nakano described the manga as a high-quality picaresque fiction built upon a Sherlock Holmes pastiche.

== See also ==
- All You Need Is Kill, a light novel whose manga adaptation was written by Ryosuke Takeuchi
- Stars, a manga series written by Ryosuke Takeuchi
- Kanshikan Tsunemori Akane, a manga series written and illustrated by Hikaru Miyoshi
