= Edge of Tomorrow =

2014 film by Doug Liman

- Theatrical release poster
- Directed by: Doug Liman
- Screenplay by: Christopher McQuarrie; Jez Butterworth; John-Henry Butterworth
- Based on: All You Need Is Kill by Hiroshi Sakurazaka
- Produced by: Erwin Stoff; Tom Lassally; Jeffrey Silver; Gregory Jacobs; Jason Hoffs
- Starring: Tom Cruise; Emily Blunt; Bill Paxton; Brendan Gleeson
- Cinematography: Dion Beebe
- Edited by: James Herbert; Laura Jennings
- Music by: Christophe Beck
- Production companies: Warner Bros. Pictures; Village Roadshow Pictures; RatPac Entertainment; 3 Arts Entertainment; Viz Productions; Translux
- Distributed by: Warner Bros. Pictures
- Release dates: May 28, 2014 (London IMAX); June 6, 2014 (United States)
- Running time: 113 minutes
- Country: United States
- Language: English
- Budget: $178 million
- Box office: $381 million

Edge of Tomorrow (marketed for home media as Live Die Repeat: Edge of Tomorrow) is a 2014 American military science fiction action film directed by Doug Liman and written by Christopher McQuarrie, Jez Butterworth and John-Henry Butterworth, based loosely on the 2004 Japanese light novel All You Need Is Kill by Hiroshi Sakurazaka. Starring Tom Cruise and Emily Blunt, the film takes place in a future where most of Europe is occupied by an alien race known as Mimics. Major William Cage (Cruise), a public relations officer with no combat experience, is forced by his superiors to join a landing operation against the aliens, only to find himself experiencing a time loop as he tries to find a way to defeat the mimics. Bill Paxton, Brendan Gleeson and Noah Taylor appear in supporting roles.

In late 2009, 3 Arts Entertainment purchased the rights to All You Need Is Kill and sold the spec script to Warner Bros. Pictures. The studio produced Edge of Tomorrow with the involvement of 3 Arts, the novel's publisher Viz Media, and Australian production company Village Roadshow Pictures. Filming began in late 2012, taking place in England: at Warner Bros. Studios in Leavesden, outside London, and other locations, such as London's Trafalgar Square and the coastal Saunton Sands. A total of nine companies handled the visual effects.

Edge of Tomorrow was released theatrically in select territories on May 30, 2014, and in the United States on June 6. The film received positive reviews from critics, and grossed $381 million against a $178 million budget.

== Plot ==
In 2015, an alien race known as "Mimics" lands in Germany and swiftly conquers much of continental Europe, killing millions. By 2020, humanity has formed a global military alliance, the United Defense Force (UDF), to combat the Mimics. However, victory remained elusive until the recent Battle of Verdun, which was secured by the celebrated war hero Sergeant Rita Vrataski.

In Britain, the UDF amasses forces for a major invasion of France. General Brigham orders public affairs officer Major William Cage to cover the offensive from the front line, but the inexperienced and cowardly Cage attempts to blackmail Brigham into rescinding the order. Brigham has Cage arrested, demoted to Private and sent to the military base at Heathrow Airport to join the invasion as infantry, where he is assigned to Master Sergeant Farell and the misfit J-Squad, who dislike and belittle him. The following day, the invasion forces land on a French beach but are ambushed and massacred by Mimics. Cage uses a Claymore mine to kill a larger "Alpha" Mimic. Bathed in the Mimic's blood, Cage dies during the ensuing explosion.

Cage suddenly awakens at Heathrow, realizing he is reliving the previous morning. He makes failed attempts to warn against the invasion, and experiences multiple loops in which he dies on the beach only to awaken again at Heathrow. With each loop, his combat skills and knowledge of the battlefield improve. He tries to save Rita's life so she can lead them but, after recognizing his apparent prescience, she allows herself to die, ordering Cage to find her on his next loop.

Cage quickly convinces Rita of the reset because she gained the same power after exposure to an Alpha's blood. Her loops enabled her, an initially inexperienced soldier, to win at Verdun, but a later blood transfusion removed the power. Rita takes Cage to Mimic expert Dr. Carter, who explains the creatures are a superorganism controlled by a single, gigantic "Omega" Mimic. Whenever the Alpha Mimics are killed, the Omega restarts a loop and adjusts its tactics until the Mimics win. Rita realizes the Mimics allowed the UDF victory at Verdun to make them overconfident in their new exoskeletons and lure them into overcommitting their forces in retaking Europe, allowing the Mimics to exterminate most of the resistance.

Cage spends many loops training with Rita so they can reach the Omega, but he begins to care for her and struggles after seeing her repeatedly die. He experiences a vision of the Omega hidden in a German dam, and he and Rita seek it out. During the journey, the pair bond, but Rita remains distant, having seen someone she cared about die hundreds of times at Verdun. She eventually determines that this is not the first loop in which they approached the Omega. Cage reveals that she always dies before reaching the dam, regardless of his actions, and he is unwilling to kill the Omega and end the loops if she remains dead. Upset, Rita attempts to leave but is killed by a Mimic. Despondent, during the next loop, Cage travels to the dam alone. He discovers the vision was a trap and is ambushed by an Alpha, and Cage drowns himself before it can remove his power.

To find the Omega, Cage and Rita sneak into General Brigham's office and pressure him into handing over a prototype transponder designed by Carter. Having used it to locate the Omega beneath the Louvre Pyramid in Paris, Cage is knocked unconscious during their escape and given a blood transfusion for his injuries, removing his power.

Rita frees Cage, who then uses his detailed knowledge of J-Squad to convince them to help destroy the Omega. They fly to Paris, where the squad members sacrifice themselves to ensure Cage and Rita reach the Louvre. Cornered by an Alpha, Rita kisses Cage, lamenting that she does not have more time to get to know him. The Alpha kills Rita and mortally wounds Cage, but he drops several grenades that destroy the Omega, which not only kills the Mimics, but also bathes Cage in its blood.

Cage reawakens before his first meeting with General Brigham, and witnesses a news announcement that all Mimics are dead following a mysterious energy surge in Paris, before returning to Heathrow and finding Rita. Oblivious to his identity, she inquires what he wants; Cage chuckles.

== Cast ==
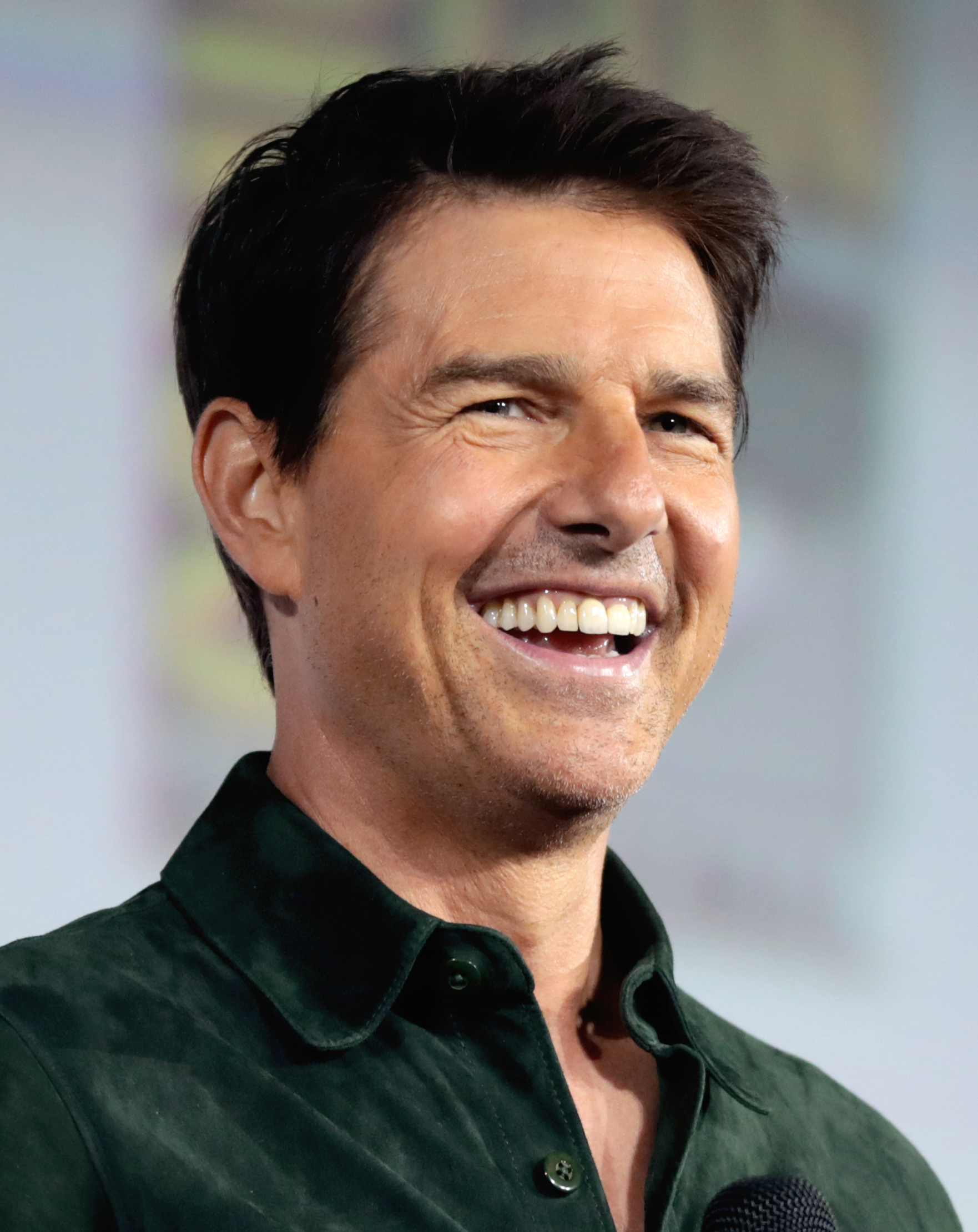
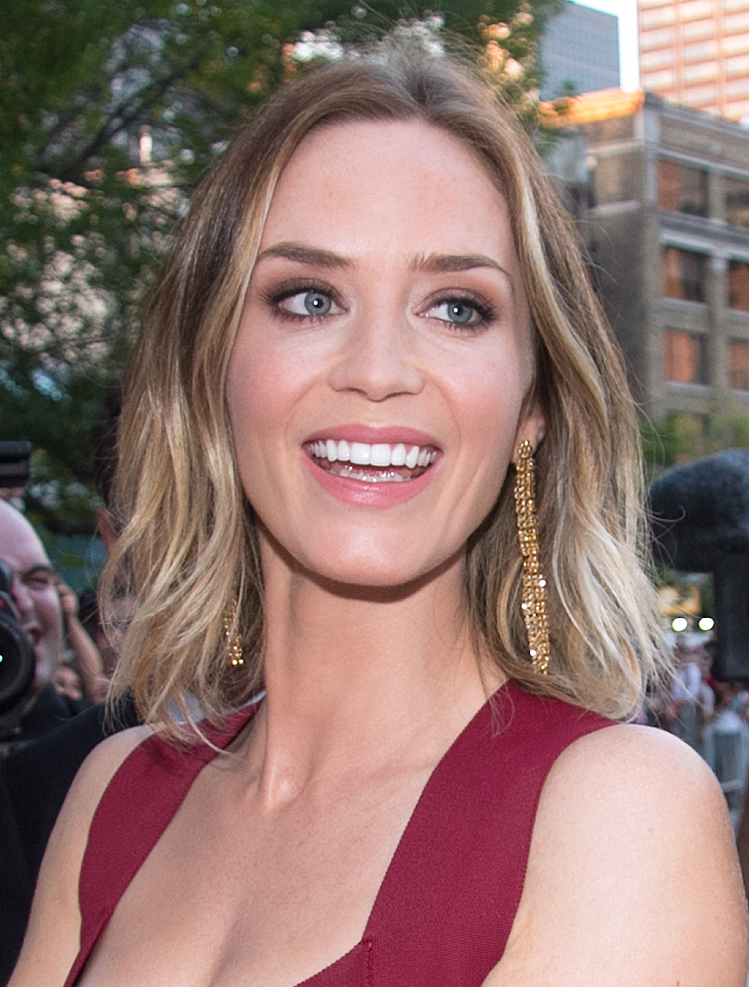
Tom Cruise and Emily Blunt play the lead roles in the film.
- Tom Cruise as Major William Cage
- Emily Blunt as Sergeant Rita Vrataski
- Bill Paxton as Master Sergeant Farell
- Brendan Gleeson as General Brigham
- Noah Taylor as Dr. Noah Carter
- Kick Gurry as Griff
- Dragomir Mrsic as Kuntz
- Charlotte Riley as Nance
- Jonas Armstrong as Skinner
- Franz Drameh as Ford
- Masayoshi Haneda as Takeda
- Tony Way as Kimmel
- Lara Pulver as Karen Lord
- Madeleine Mantock as Corporal Julie Montgomery
- Martin Hyder as Drunk
- Harry Landis as Old Man 3
- Marianne Jean-Baptiste as Dr. Whittle (uncredited)

== Crew ==
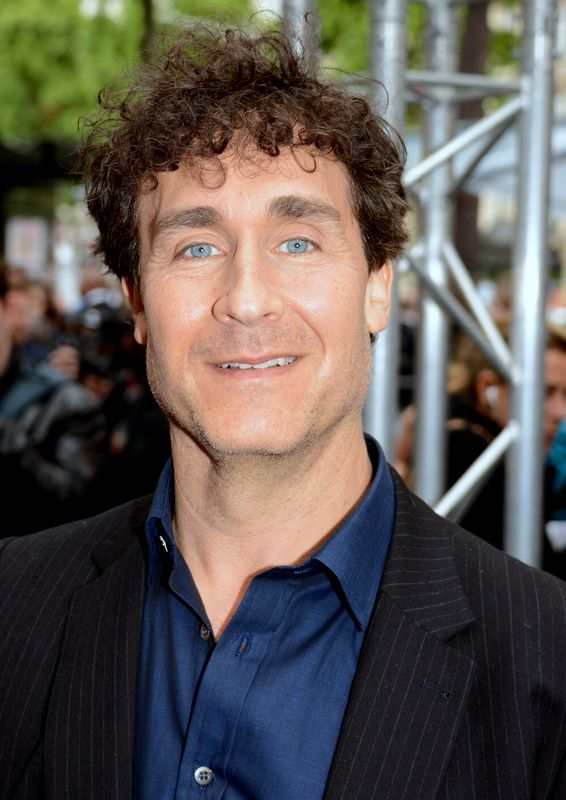
Director Doug Liman at the Paris premiere of the film

- Doug Liman – director
- Christopher McQuarrie – co-writer
- Jez Butterworth – co-writer
- John-Henry Butterworth – co-writer
- Erwin Stoff – producer
- Tom Lassally – producer
- Jeffrey Silver – producer
- Gregory Jacobs – producer
- Jason Hoffs – producer
- Dion Beebe – cinematographer
- Oliver Scholl – production designer
- Kate Hawley – costume designer
- James Herbert – editor
- Laura Jennings – editor
- Christophe Beck – music composer
- Nick Davis – visual effects supervisor

== Production ==
=== Development and writing ===
Viz Media published All You Need Is Kill in North America in 2009 as one of four translated Japanese science fiction novels that initiated its Haikasoru imprint. After drawing the interest of producer Erwin Stoff, his company 3 Arts Entertainment optioned the novel that same year. 3 Arts collaborated with the publisher's filmmaking subsidiary Viz Productions, headed by Jason Hoffs. Viz Media president Hidemi Fukuhara served as executive producer. Instead of making a pitch to a major studio to purchase the property and proceed with writing and producing a film adaptation, the company developed a spec script to show the studios. Stoff approached writer Dante Harper and sent him a copy of the novel. Harper found the book "too complex" to properly adapt, but, despite the prospect of not getting paid, he chose to "risk it" and accepted the job, taking eight months to write the script. Upon completion, Warner Bros. Pictures purchased it in a $3 million deal in April 2010. The studio hired Doug Liman to direct the film the following August. Harper's screenplay was listed in the 2010 edition of the Black List, a survey of most-liked unproduced screenplays.

In June 2011, Joby Harold was hired to rewrite the screenplay. By September, Warner Bros. approached Brad Pitt to star; after he declined, the studio then approached Tom Cruise. Once Cruise accepted, the script changed the age of the leading role to fit the actors. In December 2011, Cruise officially joined the film. Emily Blunt entered negotiations to star opposite Cruise in April 2012. Screenwriting duo Roberto Orci and Alex Kurtzman also delivered a draft of their own but their script wasn't used in the final version.

Six months before filming started, Liman discarded two-thirds of Harper's original script. Jez Butterworth and John-Henry Butterworth were hired to rewrite the script. Screenwriter Simon Kinberg took over from the Butterworths, and eight weeks before the start of filming, Kinberg was replaced by Christopher McQuarrie. McQuarrie was introduced to the project while directing Cruise in Jack Reacher. While reading the earlier script McQuarrie "understood very clearly what the premise of the story was and what they were looking for in terms of characters". Even if the previous scripts were darker, Cruise stressed the importance of the story's humor to McQuarrie. The actor compared Cage's violent demises to Wile E. Coyote and the Road Runner, declaring, "It's fun coming up with new ways to kill yourself."

The screenplay did not yet have a satisfactory ending, and, despite the producers and studio executives worried about starting filming without a set conclusion, Liman opted to finish the script during principal photography. McQuarrie at one point suggested adding a twist involving the Mimics figuring out Cage's attack on Paris and resetting time during his strike, but discarded it as "you were so exhausted by the time you got to that point." Eventually, McQuarrie considered that focusing on the comedic aspects meant "it needed to end in a way that wasn't harsh", and thus opted to end the plot where it started, on the helicopter bringing Cage to London, fulfilling the notion that "comedies generally have to go back to the way things were".

=== Filming ===
Production began at Warner Bros. Studios Leavesden near London, which Warner Brothers had purchased as a permanent studio site. WB had been renting space there for its production of the Harry Potter films, but had been leaving the sets up permanently for nearly a decade and eventually chose to make the site semi-permanent. The parts with Tom Cruise in the opening scene were filmed in Liman's editing room, with the actor doing his own make-up and hair, leading the director to say it "may be the most independent thing I've ever done." Though Liman intended to film the beach battle on location, the studio instead ended up building a beach set at the studio site. The set was surrounded by chroma key green screens, which the visual effects artists later used to extend the beach with plates shot at Saunton Sands in North Devon. It was intended for the battle scenes to be reminiscent of coastal battles during World War II such as the Invasion of Normandy and the Battle of Dunkirk.

Principal photography began at Leavesden on October 1, 2012. The Los Angeles Times said on the second day, Liman "demanded a total reshoot of everything filmed on Day 1", which concerned producers. Filming on the beach set was scheduled to last two weeks, but extended to nearly three months due to what the Los Angeles Times called "the director's self-described 'workshop-y' filming style". Filming also took place in Trafalgar Square in London on Saturday November 24, 2012. The square was closed to the public, and tanks were brought in to film the action scenes. The brief scene in the Square required closing 36 roads, diverting 122 bus routes and booking all available rooms in nearby hotels and a costly restoration of a historic wicket at a local cricket ground after one of the production helicopters knocked it over. A former army base in the village of Barton Stacey in Hampshire was also used as a filming location for two weeks.

Liman said filming took place seven days a week using two crews to film 20 days in addition to what had originally been scheduled. The crew struggled with changed British weather since the film was supposed to be set in one day and had to maintain the same weather. The indoor beach set also became muddy, requiring the visual effects artists to enhance the environment with digital sand and surf. Though filming concluded by August 2013, actor Jeremy Piven was added to the cast and extra scenes including him were filmed; ultimately, however, Piven did not appear in the finished film. Cinematographer Dion Beebe made his first feature film with Liman, with whom he had worked previously on commercials. Beebe's approach was to develop "a world under siege, but not a bleak, dark, post-apocalyptic landscape"; Beebe preferred to avoid the saturated bleach bypass look. 35 mm film was used instead of digital cameras to evoke the World War II footage that provided inspiration for the battle scenes.

=== Design ===
Production designer Oliver Scholl and his team worked with lead builder Pierre Bohanna to develop concept art for several battle suit options based on contemporary, real-world powered exoskeleton initiatives, such as those supported by DARPA. When director Doug Liman chose a design, the team built an aluminum prototype frame that had pivot points and hinges. Costume designer Kate Hawley contributed a gritty aesthetic design for the color palettes and surface treatments. While the design was meant to be utilitarian, it was also created so the actors could be seen in the suits and also run in them. The team created a foam mock-up of Tom Cruise so the frame could be tailored for him. The team handcrafted 70 hard material and 50 soft material battle suits in the course of almost five months. There were three versions of the battle suits: "grunts, dogs, and tanks". The battle suit for Blunt's character was given red slash marks "as if to say she had been to hell and back and lived to tell about it."

Cruise, known for performing his own film stunts, also did so in Edge of Tomorrow. Both he and Blunt wore the heavy metal suits. The battle suits weighed 85 pounds (39 kg) on average; the heavier versions weighed around 130 pounds (59 kg) due to being equipped with a mock sniper rifle and rocket launcher. Blunt trained three months for her role, "focusing on everything from weights to sprints to yoga, aerial wire work and gymnastics", and studying the Israeli combat system Krav Maga.

Each actor needed four people to help put on the battle suit. Initially, Cruise needed 30 minutes to put on the suit and another 30 minutes to remove it. Ultimately, the time was reduced to 30 seconds. Between takes, the actors would be suspended by chains from iron frames to take the weight of the suits off their shoulders.

=== Visual effects ===
Nine companies handled the visual effects for Edge of Tomorrow under VFX supervisor Nick Davis. Davis worked with the crew of The Third Floor on the film's previsualization process. Sony Pictures Imageworks (SPI) worked on the first two acts of the film and created over 400 shots, including photorealistic environments, battle scenes, and computer-generated creatures and characters. One major shot involved covering London Heathrow Airport with military troops, vehicles, and aircraft; SPI split some of the work with Framestore. Cinesite joined in production and developed 221 shots for ten key sequences, with 189 appearing in the final cut.

An Alpha during the beach battle. The design for the extraterrestrial race aimed to be as otherworldly as possible, with a body consisting mostly of tentacles built out of obsidian-like shards.

Designers created the alien Mimics to look different from any terrestrial animal. Davis and Liman favored an early model composed primarily of tentacles. SPI's Dan Kramer described its appearance as "heavy black spaghetti" and noted that the modelers faced a challenge creating the tentacled creatures. A technical animator created an Autodesk Maya plugin that made the movement of each tentacle independent. Since Liman did not want the Mimics to look "too organic or terrestrial", Imageworks' artists devised the idea of making the aliens out of an obsidian-like material, "basically a glass that could cut". Various debris was incorporated within the tentacles to give the creature a sense of weight and fast movement. The Alphas were given a definable head area to show their status as more sentient, while receiving a different color and a bigger size compared to the Mimic grunts. Cinesite created the mechanical Mimics used in the training areas, while Moving Picture Company (MPC) created the Omega in a digital environment into which the visual effects artists composited underwater footage filmed at Leavesden's water tank.

Animators created digital versions of the battle suits, at times with the soldiers inside them. On the set, a 3D scanner booth digitized the actors, while hand scanners captured the textures of the practical suits. Imageworks received pieces of the suits for reference. The company's library of reflection data on various materials helped enhance the armor's shading. SPI's crew created the base at Heathrow by merging the set at Leavesden with digitally altered footage from the airport; the film's dropships, barracks and mess halls replaced the existing aircraft. Framestore created the digital Paris and recreated it with photomodeling from three days of visits. Given that the city is a no-fly zone, Framestore's artists obtained their aerial images by climbing an 80-meter crane parked in the Louvre courtyard. The quadcopter dropships were based on the Bell Boeing V-22 Osprey that can tilt its rotors to fly as either planes or helicopters, while having a design closer to the Quad TiltRotor. Aside from the crashed ship on the beachhead and a gimbal set to depict the plane used by Cage's squad, the film used digital models for most ships. The computer-generated dropships had some of Imageworks' heaviest detail given the proximity of the actors to the aircraft in the camp scenes; the visual effects artists wanted to make sure the ships broke apart realistically during the crashes.

Prime Focus World converted the film into 3D in post-production using the same tools for the stereoscopy as in World War Z and Gravity. The company made use of scans of the cast's faces from film production while vendor Nvizible helped the company convert the hologram table used by Dr. Carter.

=== Music ===
Composer Christophe Beck was a late addition to the film, taking over from Ramin Djawadi, who was Liman's first choice to replace his frequent collaborator John Powell, as Powell was on sabbatical. Edge of Tomorrow marked Beck's first science fiction film score. To prepare, Beck watched the film with temp tracks, including one from the 2012 film Battleship. He experimented with repeating the music with the scenes, but because this approach did not frequently fit the events on the screen, Beck used minimal repetition in the film. "The day is reset dozens of times in the film and it would get very repetitive to approach that musically the same way every time", Beck recalled. He initially tried for "traditional heroic themes" that involved horns and trumpets, but he said Liman "preferred a non-traditional approach, driven by percussion and distorted orchestra". To that end, Beck used the pizzicato playing technique, "not in the traditional, plinky-plinky-isn't-this-funny way, but a little darker, and always accompanied by some higher concept synth colors". The distorted orchestral samples enhanced the comedic tone of the extended sequences where Cage recurrently dies in battle, as the director felt it was important for the audience to find humor in this sequence. With Liman's approach, the composer said there were "only a couple of traditional themes" in the film, including one for Emily Blunt's character Rita.

== Release ==
=== Marketing ===
I think the word 'kill' in a title is very tricky in today's world. I don't know that people want to be bombarded with that word. I don't know that people want to be opening the newspaper and seeing that word. We see it enough in kind of real newspaper headlines, and I don't think we need to see it when we're looking at a movie.

— Producer Erwin Stoff on changing the title

Warner Bros. invested over $100 million in the marketing campaign for Edge of Tomorrow. The film was initially titled All You Need Is Kill after the light novel, but as filming ended in July 2013, Warner Bros. changed the title to Edge of Tomorrow; Warner Bros. president Sue Kroll said the title was changed partly due to "negative chatter" about the word "kill" in the title. Doug Liman, who said he rejected the title All You Need Is Kill because it "didn't feel like it was the tone of the movie I had made", wanted to rename the film Live Die Repeat, but Warner decided to use that just as the tagline.

The film was promoted at San Diego Comic-Con in July 2013, and at WonderCon in Anaheim, California in April 2014. Turner Broadcasting, a subsidiary of Time Warner like the studio Warner Bros., promoted the film across its TV properties, including CNN, TNT, TBS, Adult Swim, TruTV, and Funny or Die. Variety said the move "put forth the notion that buying bigger packages of advertisements across a TV company's holdings is a viable option in an increasingly fragmented TV-viewing landscape". Turner also launched a website which would unlock film-related content like "a 3D game, back stories and artwork" if its promotional hashtag was circulated enough through the social media website Twitter.

Viz Media released a new edition of the light novel on April 29, 2014, retitled Edge of Tomorrow. It also published a graphic novel adaptation of the light novel on May 5, 2014.

For the film's release on home media, Warner Bros. formed two teams for a September 28, 2014, Tough Mudder endurance event series in Black Diamond, Washington. The teams included YouTube personalities and participants from the TV series American Ninja Warrior. Warner Bros. based the teams on the soldiers from "J Squad" in the film. To promote teamwork, the two teams competed in a Tough Mudder obstacle course.

=== Box office forecast ===
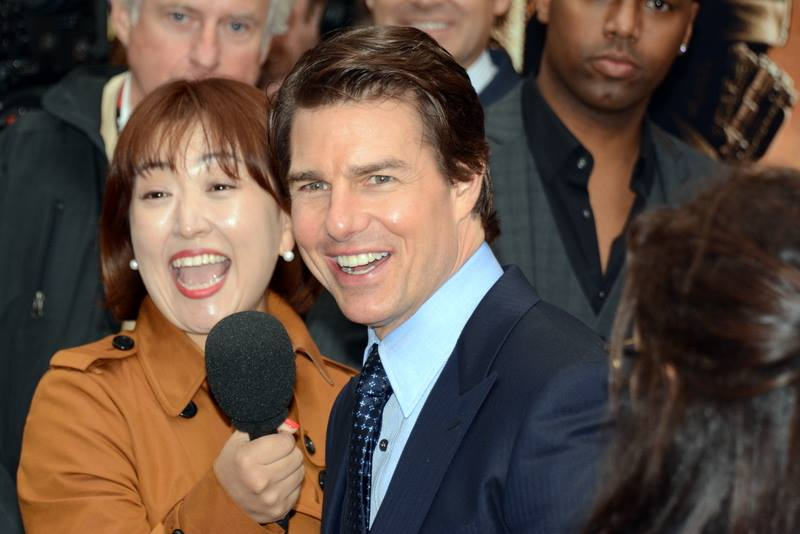
Tom Cruise in Paris at the French premiere of Edge of Tomorrow

Weeks before the film's release, reports in early May 2014 predicted an underwhelming box-office performance in the North American (United States and Canada) box office for Edge of Tomorrow. Variety noted a "worrisome lack of buzz" leading up to the film's release. Initial box office tracking at the start of the month for the film estimated a gross between $25 million and $30 million on its opening weekend. Several weeks later, the estimate decreased by $5 million. The film planned to compete with The Fault in Our Stars in the same opening weekend with an equivalent estimated gross around $25 million. TheWrap predicted that this competition could potentially affect the opening weekend gross of Edge of Tomorrow. In contrast, Variety said Edge of Tomorrow could serve as counterprogramming to The Fault in Our Stars since that film's demographic is women under 25 years old.

With its budget of over $175 million, The Hollywood Reporter called Edge of Tomorrow one of the "biggest box-office risks" in North America for mid-2014. The trade paper said the film was similar to Oblivion, a 2013 science fiction film that also starred Tom Cruise, and that like Oblivion, it would likely perform better outside North America. Box Office Mojo reported that four of Cruise's films with original material—Valkyrie (2008), Knight and Day (2010), Jack Reacher (2012), and Oblivion (2013)—failed to gross more than $100 million in North America. The website forecast that Edge of Tomorrow would gross $90 million in North America and $220 million in other territories. TheWrap said that the studio focused on theatrical releases in other territories where Cruise "remains a major force" in drawing audiences. Variety, writing from the U.S. perspective, said, "Media reports have been quick to speculate that Edge of Tomorrow may be one of the summer's first big bombs based on the lack of enthusiasm by U.S. audiences. That may come to pass, but these reports downplay the centrality of foreign markets in today's globalized movie industry."

In the week prior to the release of Edge of Tomorrow in North America, its estimated opening-weekend gross increased from the mid-$20 million range to $27 million.

=== Box office ===
Edge of Tomorrow initiated its theatrical run in several territories on May 28, 2014, and rolled out to a total of 28 territories for its opening weekend of May 30 – June 1, 2014. It grossed $20.1 million on its opening weekend. For the second weekend of June 6–8, 2014, it was released in 36 additional territories. Edge of Tomorrow grossed $100 million in North America and $281 million in other territories for a worldwide total of $381 million. After the film's theatrical run, Entertainment Weekly said it had a "lukewarm box-office reception" despite praise from critics.

==== Opening weekend ====
The film had premiere screenings in London, Paris, and New York City on May 28, 2014. The cast and the crew mimicked the film's time loop premise by attending the premieres in a single day, traveling westward to attend them on a staggered schedule. The film was screened in New York City at 11:59 pm, the time chosen to refer to the film title. The film was released in theaters in 28 territories—including the United Kingdom, Brazil, Germany, Spain, and Indonesia—on the weekend of May 30, 2014. Certain territories with strong association football followings were chosen so the film could screen to audiences before the month-long 2014 FIFA World Cup began on June 12, 2014. Edge of Tomorrow competed against Maleficent starring Angelina Jolie, which opened the same weekend in 46 territories.

On its opening weekend in 5,018 screens across 28 territories, Edge of Tomorrow grossed $20.1 million. The Hollywood Reporter called the film's debut a "soft" opening. In many territories, Edge of Tomorrow ranked third behind fellow new release Maleficent and holdover X-Men: Days of Future Past. These included the United Kingdom, where the film ranked third and grossed $3.1 million, where Cruise's 2013 film Oblivion had opened with $7.6 million, and Germany, with an income of $2.1 million compared to Oblivion's $2.6 million. Edge of Tomorrow ranked first in Indonesia and Taiwan, grossing $2 million and $1.9 million, respectively. Its opening weekend in 286 screens in Indonesia was Tom Cruise's biggest opening, to date, in the country. The film also grossed $1.5 million in Italy and $1.5 million in Spain. Deadline.com said the film had good word of mouth, citing significant increases in Saturday grosses compared to the Friday grosses in the United Kingdom, Germany, and Spain. Bloomberg Businessweek reported that $110 million was grossed in the first week of release and summarized its debut, "While it did solid business in Asia, its reception in Germany, France, and the U.K. has been tepid."

==== Second weekend ====
In the first week of June 2014, Edge of Tomorrow opened in 36 additional markets, including North America, China, Russia, South Korea and France. The film was now showing in 63 countries and 19,000 screens. The film led the global weekend box office with $28.8 million in North America and $82 million elsewhere. The debut in China occurred on Monday, June 2, to take advantage of the Dragon Boat Festival holiday. Edge of Tomorrow topped the Chinese box office with $26.7 million, encompassing 4.06 million admissions in 99,768 screenings. Edge of Tomorrow's debut in both Russia ($8.6 million) and South Korea ($3.8 million, taking advantage of a five-day holiday) marked Tom Cruise's highest-grossing opening weekend in both countries.

Edge of Tomorrow was released in 3,490 theaters in North America on June 6, 2014. The ticket service Fandango reported advance tickets surpassed Tom Cruise's previous film Oblivion, but were being overcome by the competing film The Fault in Our Stars. Edge of Tomorrow grossed $28.8 million on the opening weekend, ranking it third below The Fault in Our Stars ($48 million) and Maleficent ($34.3 million). Polling firm CinemaScore said 61% of the opening weekend audiences were male. It reported that audiences overall gave Edge of Tomorrow a "B+" grade, where younger filmgoers gave "A" and "A−" grades. The Los Angeles Times said the disappointing box office performances of non-franchise films Edge of Tomorrow and Blended, both produced and distributed by Warner Bros. Pictures, indicated risky investments by the studio, which had better success earlier in the year with franchise films The Lego Movie and Godzilla (2014).

==== Subsequent weekends ====
In its second weekend of release in North America (June 13–15, 2014), Edge of Tomorrow had a "light" second-weekend drop of 43% due to word of mouth and grossed $16.5 million on the second weekend. In the same weekend in territories outside North America, the film was on 14,725 screens. With approximately 5.1 million admissions, it grossed $37.3 million. China, Russia, and South Korea, respectively, had the film's largest weekend grosses among the territories. In South Korea, the film ranked first at the box office for two consecutive weekends, grossing a total of $25.65 million by June 17, 2014.

In Japan, Edge of Tomorrow was released on July 4, 2014, under the light novel's title All You Need Is Kill. The film opened second in the weekend rankings behind Maleficent, with an intake of $4.5 million. As of November 30, 2014, with $15.3 million, Edge of Tomorrow is the sixth-highest-grossing foreign movie of the year in Japan, and the 21st overall.

=== Home media ===
Edge of Tomorrow was released on DVD, Blu-ray, and video on demand in the United States on October 7, 2014. The Blu-ray includes over 90 minutes of bonus features. The home release's packaging downplays the original Edge of Tomorrow title in favor of placing more prominence on the film's original tagline, "Live. Die. Repeat." Media critics believed that the re-branding was an attempt by Warner Bros. to re-launch the film's marketing following its lackluster U.S. box office performance. Posters for the film's theatrical release had similarly placed a larger emphasis on the "Live. Die. Repeat." tagline than the actual title of the film. Similarly, some digital retailers listed the film under the title Live Die Repeat: Edge of Tomorrow. The film ranked first in home media sales for the week beginning October 7, with 62% of sales coming from the Blu-ray version. The DVD and Blu-ray releases grossed $27.9 million in the United States. On July 5, 2022, Edge of Tomorrow was released on 4K Blu-ray.

== Reception ==
=== Critical response ===
Edge of Tomorrow received largely positive reviews from critics, who praised the humor, Liman's direction, the aliens' design, Cruise and Blunt's performances, and the time-loop premise's ability to remain fresh. Some critics had issues with the film's conclusion. Based on 339 reviews, review aggregation website Rotten Tomatoes reports that 91% of critics gave the film a positive review, with a rating average of 7.5/10. The website's critical consensus reads: "Gripping, well-acted, funny, and clever, Edge of Tomorrow offers entertaining proof that Tom Cruise is still more than capable of shouldering the weight of a blockbuster action thriller." On another aggregator, Metacritic, the film has a weighted average score of 71 out of 100, based on reviews from 43 critics, indicating "generally favorable" reviews. Audiences polled by CinemaScore gave the film an average grade of "B+" on an A+ to F scale.

Justin Chang of Variety called Edge of Tomorrow "a cleverly crafted and propulsively executed sci-fi thriller", saying that the film was director Doug Liman's best since The Bourne Identity (2002). Chang said that the screenwriters, with the assistance of the editors, "tell their story in a breezy narrative shorthand (and at times, sleight-of-hand), transforming what must surely be an unbelievably tedious gauntlet for our hero into a deft, playful and continually involving viewing experience". Regarding the relationship between Cruise and Blunt's characters, Chang said "Liman handles it with a pleasing lightness of touch that extends to the proceedings as a whole." He also commended the visual effects of the "expertly designed Mimics" as well as Dion Beebe's cinematography.

Todd McCarthy, writing for The Hollywood Reporter, said the film was "a narratively ambitious sci-fi actioner" that "takes a relatively playful attitude toward the familiar battle tropes". McCarthy said that, despite the humor, he found the time loop premise "tedious" and that "the final stretch becomes dramatically unconvincing and visually murky". However, he also called the effects "exciting, convincing and gritty" and applauded Gleeson and Paxton in their supporting roles. Kenneth Turan of the Los Angeles Times gave the film a positive review, considering the film "a star-driven mass-market entertainment that's smart, exciting and unexpected while not stinting on genre satisfactions" that broke a string of "cookie-cutter, been-there blockbusters".

Edge of Tomorrow was listed on 23 critics' top ten lists of movies of 2014 (out of 201 evaluated).

David Hynes of WhatCulture ranked Dante Harper's original script, All You Need Is Kill (2010), fifth in a list of the "10 Best Movie Screenplays Since 2010", considering certain changes made for the film to be detrimental: "Is it me or does [the title Edge of Tomorrow] suck in comparison? [...] The conflict between Cage and the Mimics is also far more localised to the beach and marine barracks in the screenplay which improves the cohesiveness of the overall story, whereas Cruise finds himself up in a helicopter in no time in the film version."

In July 2025, it was one of the films voted for the "Readers' Choice" edition of The New York Times' list of "The 100 Best Movies of the 21st Century," finishing at number 275.

=== Accolades ===
Accolades received by Edge of Tomorrow
Award	Date of ceremony	Category	Recipient(s)	Result	Ref.
Alliance of Women Film Journalists Awards	January 12, 2015	Best Female Action Star	Emily Blunt	Won	
Alliance of Women Film Journalists Awards	January 12, 2015	Most Egregious Age Difference Between The Leading Man and The Love Interest	Tom Cruise and Emily Blunt	Nominated	
Annie Awards	January 31, 2015	Outstanding Achievement for Animated Effects in a Live Action Production	Steve Avoujageli, Atsushi Ikarashi, Pawel Grochola, Paul Waggoner, and Viktor Lundqvist	Won	
Critics' Choice Movie Awards	January 15, 2015	Best Action Movie	Edge of Tomorrow	Nominated	
Critics' Choice Movie Awards	January 15, 2015	Best Actor in an Action Movie	Tom Cruise	Nominated	
Critics' Choice Movie Awards	January 15, 2015	Best Actress in an Action Movie	Emily Blunt	Won	
Critics' Choice Movie Awards	January 15, 2015	Best Visual Effects	Edge of Tomorrow	Nominated	
Empire Awards	March 29, 2015	Best Actress	Emily Blunt	Nominated	
Golden Trailer Awards	May 30, 2014	Best Action	"Believe Again" (Wild Card)	Nominated	
Golden Trailer Awards	May 30, 2014	Best Summer 2014 Blockbuster Trailer	"Converge Trailer" (AV Squad)	Nominated	
Golden Trailer Awards	May 6, 2015	Best Action TV Spot	"Judgment Day" (TRANSIT)	Nominated	
Golden Trailer Awards	October 6, 2022	Best Digital: Action	"Power" (Arkive Creative)	Won	
Hugo Awards	August 22, 2015	Best Dramatic Presentation, Long Form	Christopher McQuarrie, Jez Butterworth, John-Henry Butterworth, and Doug Liman	Nominated	
London Film Critics Circle Awards	January 18, 2015	British Actress of the Year	Emily Blunt	Nominated	
San Diego Film Critics Society Awards	December 15, 2014	Best Editing	James Herbert and Laura Jennings	Won	
Saturn Awards	June 25, 2015	Best Science Fiction Film	Edge of Tomorrow	Nominated	
Saturn Awards	June 25, 2015	Best Director	Doug Liman	Nominated	
Saturn Awards	June 25, 2015	Best Writing	Christopher McQuarrie, Jez Butterworth, and John-Henry Butterworth	Nominated	
Saturn Awards	June 25, 2015	Best Actor	Tom Cruise	Nominated	
Saturn Awards	June 25, 2015	Best Actress	Emily Blunt	Nominated	
Saturn Awards	June 25, 2015	Best Editing	James Herbert and Laura Jennings	Won	
Saturn Awards	June 25, 2015	Best Special Effects	Gary Brozenich, Nick Davis, Jonathan Fawkner, and Matthew Rouleau	Nominated	
Teen Choice Awards	August 10, 2014	Choice Movie: Action	Edge of Tomorrow	Nominated	
Teen Choice Awards	August 10, 2014	Choice Movie Actor: Action	Tom Cruise	Nominated	
Teen Choice Awards	August 10, 2014	Choice Movie Actress: Action	Emily Blunt	Nominated	
Visual Effects Society Awards	February 4, 2015	Outstanding Virtual Cinematography in a Photoreal/Live Action Feature Motion Picture	Albert Cheng, Jose Enrique Astacio Jr., Michael Havart, and Dion Beebe for "Beach and Paris Attacks"	Nominated	
Visual Effects Society Awards	February 4, 2015	Outstanding Effects Simulations in a Photoreal/Live Action Feature Motion Picture	Steve Avoujageli, Pawel Grochola, Atushi Ikarashi, and Paul Waggoner for "Destruction and Sand"	Nominated	
Visual Effects Society Awards	February 4, 2015	Outstanding Compositing in a Photoreal/Live Action Feature Motion Picture	Craig Wentworth, Matthew Welford, Marie Victoria Denoga, and Frank Fieser for "Beach"	Nominated	

== Future ==
=== Possible sequel ===
In a December 2015 interview with Collider, McQuarrie said that Cruise had an idea for a sequel, and that the concept is "locked and loaded." In April 2016, Doug Liman had signed on to direct the sequel, while Race screenwriters Joe Shrapnel and Anna Waterhouse were to write the script for the film. In October 2016, Liman stated that the film would "revolutionize how people make sequels", and went on to say that the story is "much better than the original film" and that it is "a sequel that's a prequel." In May 2017, Liman revealed that the title would be Live Die Repeat and Repeat and that both Cruise and Blunt would reprise their roles from the first film. In January 2018, Liman said that Live Die Repeat and Repeat could be his next film and that scheduling issues have been worked out and the film was moving steadily toward a window in which to start production. In March 2018, Liman said that he was now working with Jez Butterworth on a script rewrite for the film. Later that month, Blunt stated that she, Cruise and Liman were all enthusiastic about the project, but also noted that "It's a lot for all the stars to align for everyone to be free at the same time and available to do it at the same time." In March 2019, it was reported that Matthew Robinson would rewrite the screenplay, and in October, Liman confirmed that the script was finished.

After numerous delays, Liman said on Instagram that the project was still in "planning stages" as of January 2020. In January 2021, Liman continued to suggest a sequel would eventually happen and merely needs the two stars to pull the trigger. Blunt has since stated that due to the COVID-19 pandemic, the budget for another film would be "too expensive", casting further doubt on a possible sequel. In June 2023, Blunt reiterated her interest in a returning for a sequel, but said she did not know when it would happen. That month, McQuarrie said that getting the sequel produced had been a complicated situation thus far. In August 2023, Blunt stated that Cruise's busy schedule was preventing production from moving forward.

In January 2024, following a contractual partnership between Cruise and Warner Bros. Pictures, it was revealed that the actor would develop and appear in various projects from the studio. It was stated that co-heads/co-chairpeople Michael De Luca and Pamela Abdy had been in negotiations with Cruise to develop an Edge of Tomorrow sequel following the project's many delays. They discussed a potential sequel at a meeting that month.

=== Television series ===
In February 2022, it was revealed by Village Roadshow Pictures (now Alcon Entertainment) that Warner Bros. Pictures had been developing a television series spin-off of the film with intentions to release the show exclusively on HBO Max.

== Other adaptation ==
All You Need Is Kill was adapted into a Japanese animated film in 2025.

== See also ==
- List of films featuring time loops
- List of films featuring powered exoskeletons
- List of science fiction films of the 2010s
- The Defence of Duffer's Drift, a 1904 short book with a similar premise
- "Edge of Tomorty: Rick Die Rickpeat", a 2019 television episode from Rick and Morty, named after the film and its tagline
