= Hiroshi Sakurazaka =

Japanese writer

- Born: 1970 (age 55–56); Tokyo, Japan
- Occupation: Novelist
- Writing career
- Language: Japanese
- Genres: Science fiction, fantasy
- Notable works: All You Need Is Kill; Modern Magic Made Simple

Hiroshi Sakurazaka (桜坂 洋, Sakurazaka Hiroshi; born 1970) is a Japanese author of science fiction and fantasy light novels. He is best known for his novel All You Need Is Kill, which formed the basis of the film Edge of Tomorrow, starring Tom Cruise and Emily Blunt.

== Life and career ==
Sakurazaka originally began in a career in IT.

He made his literary debut in 2002 at the second Super Dash Novel Rookie of the Year Award with Mahō tsukai no netto (魔法使いのネット), which was later published in December 2003 under the name Yoku Wakaru Gendai Mahō. This work has subsequently been expanded into a series of light novels and has been made into an anime. In 2004, he was presented the S-F Magazine Readers Award for Best Short Story for "The Saitama Chain Saw Massacre". His 2004 novel All You Need Is Kill received high praise from other authors in Japan and has been published in English by Viz Media.

Sakurazaka has an interest in computers and video games. He is knowledgeable about computer culture, can program in Perl, is able to use specialized text editors such as Meadow, and can typeset in TeX.

He has collaborated with cultural critic Hiroki Azuma on the works Geet State (ギートステイト) and Characters (キャラクターズ) and has written a critique of Yasutaka Tsutsui's novel Dancing Vanity.

=== Film adaptation ===
Sakurazaka's novel All You Need Is Kill was optioned by Warner Bros. Based upon the story, the screenplay was written by Dante Harper and Joby Harold with a working title We Mortals Are. Originally Brad Pitt was approached to play the lead, but he had conflicts with other films for which Warner wanted him. In October 2011, Tom Cruise began talks for the project to be directed by Doug Liman. In June 2014, the movie premiered with the title Edge of Tomorrow.

== Awards ==
- 2004: S-F Magazine Readers Award Best Short Story for "The Saitama Chain Saw Massacre" (さいたまチェーンソー少女, Saitama Chainsaw Shōjo)
  - English translation of this short story was included in the anthology Hanzai Japan (Haikasoru, 2015).

== Bibliography ==
- All You Need Is Kill (2004; ISBN 978-4-08-630219-7); English translation: All You Need Is Kill (2009; ISBN 978-1-4215-2761-1), retitled mass-market paperback edition: Edge of Tomorrow (2014)
- Slum Online (スラムオンライン, Suramu onrain) (2005); Revised: Slum Online EX (スラムオンラインEX, Suramu onrain EX) (2014); (English version contains a short story Bonus Round (エキストラ・ラウンド, "Ekisutora Raundo") (2010). Revised Japanese version included the same short.) (2010; ISBN 978-1-4215-3439-8)
- Characters (キャラクターズ, Kyarakutāzu) (2008) (co-written with Hiroki Azuma)

=== Yoku Wakaru Gendai Mahō series ===
- Yoku Wakaru Gendai Mahō (よくわかる現代魔法, "Comprehensible Modern Magic") (2003; ISBN 4-08-630163-6)
  - Revised version: Yoku Wakaru Gendai Mahō 1 new edition (よくわかる現代魔法 1 new edition) (2008; ISBN 978-4-08-630421-4)
- Yoku Wakaru Gendai Mahō 2 Gābēji Korekutā (よくわかる現代魔法 2 ガーベージコレクター, "Garbage Collector") (2004; ISBN 4-08-630184-9)
- Yoku Wakaru Gendai Mahō 3 Gōsutosukuriputo Fō Uizāzu (よくわかる現代魔法 3 ゴーストスクリプト・フォー・ウィザーズ, "Ghostscript for Wizards") (2004; ISBN 4-08-630204-7)
- Yoku Wakaru Gendai Mahō 4 jini Tsukai (よくわかる現代魔法 4 jini使い, "Jini Handler") (2005; ISBN 4-08-630221-7)
- Yoku Wakaru Gendai Mahō 5 TMTOWTDI Tatta Hitotsu Ja Nai Saeta Yarikata (よくわかる現代魔法 5 TMTOWTDI たったひとつじゃない冴えたやりかた, "TMTOWTDI Not The Only Neat Thing To Do") (2005; ISBN 4-08-630236-5)
- Yoku Wakaru Gendai Mahō 6 Firefox! (よくわかる現代魔法 6 Firefox!) (2009; ISBN 978-4-08-630475-7)

== Sources ==
- "ALL YOU NEED IS KILL". Haikasoru.
- Entry in The Encyclopedia of Science Fiction
