= Glenarm (disambiguation) =

Glenarm is a village in County Antrim, Northern Ireland

Glenarm or Glen Arm may also refer to:

- Glenarm, Illinois, an unincorporated community in Sangamon County
- Glenarm, Kentucky
- Glen Arm, Maryland, an unincorporated community in Baltimore County
- Glenarm, Ontario, a community in the City of Kawartha Lakes

== See also ==
- Glenarm Power Plant, in Pasadena, California
