= Peter Cetera (album) =

Studio album by Peter Cetera
- Released: September 23, 1981
- Recorded: 1981
- Studios: Record One, Los Angeles; Crimson Sound, Los Angeles; The Village, Los Angeles
- Genre: Rock
- Length: 36:22
- Labels: Full Moon; Warner Bros.
- Producers: Peter Cetera; Jim Boyer

Peter Cetera chronology
Peter Cetera (1981)	Solitude/Solitaire (1986)

Singles from Peter Cetera
- 1. "Livin' in the Limelight" Released: November 18, 1981

Professional ratings
Review scores
Source	Rating
AllMusic	3/5 stars
The Philadelphia Inquirer	3/5 stars

Peter Cetera, released in September 23, 1981, is the self-titled first solo release by American musician Peter Cetera, released while he was the bassist and lead vocalist of the band Chicago.

A much more rock-oriented album than the disco-influenced music Chicago had been producing at the time, Cetera released the album in September 1981 while still a member of the band. Released on Full Moon Records, a subsidiary of Warner Brothers (reissued in 2004 on Wounded Bird Records), the album was not commercially successful, peaking at number 143 on the Billboard 200 chart in March 1982, after making its first appearance on the Billboard 200 chart on January 23, 1982 at number 192. However, it is notable because Cetera is the sole writer of all songs on the album save one—"I Can Feel It," which Cetera co-wrote with Ricky Fataar and Carl Wilson. Wilson, a member of the Beach Boys and a friend of Cetera's, also played guitar on the song. The single "Livin' in the Limelight," the only hit from the album, was released on November 18, 1981, and peaked at number six in the Billboard Mainstream Rock chart.

One year after Peter Cetera was released, Cetera and Chicago launched a major comeback with the number one single, "Hard to Say I'm Sorry", and album, Chicago 16. After 1984's Chicago 17 was also a massive hit, Cetera left the band to concentrate fully on his solo career. The song, "On the Line", which appears on this album, was on the B-side of the 45 RPM single of Cetera's first number one song as a solo performer in 1986, "Glory of Love".

== Production ==
The album was produced by Cetera and Jim Boyer and was recorded digitally.

== Artwork and packaging ==
The painting of Cetera playing the bass guitar, used for the album cover, was by John Nieto. Contemporary artist Nieto is known for his use of vibrant, electric hues and bold strokes in his paintings. The photograph of Cetera on the dust cover inside was by Diane Nini.

== Release, promotion, marketing ==
When Columbia Records dropped Chicago in 1981, Cetera was in the middle of recording his first solo album for the same label. He had to personally buy the rights to the album before it could be released. According to Cetera, Chicago's new record company, Warner Bros., released the Peter Cetera album while it was waiting for Chicago 16 to be released. Cetera has asserted that one reason for the album's poor commercial success, however, was lack of support from the record company: the record company didn't want it to be successful and didn't promote it for fear that he would leave the group. In his 2011 autobiography, former Chicago bandmate, Danny Seraphine, backs up Cetera on this point, writing, "... [the album] sank like a stone due to lack of record company support. Warner Brothers didn't want it to interfere with their plans for Chicago." A full-page advertisement announcing the album appeared on page 100 of the November 21, 1981 issue of Billboard magazine.

== Critical reception ==
Rob Theakston of AllMusic, in a 3/5 stars review, found "For anyone but die-hard Chicago/Cetera fans, this is nothing more than a passing fancy, and those looking for Cetera's safe and accessible ballads will be mildly disappointed. But fans of early-'80s rock will be pleasantly surprised if they approach this record with open ears."

The Philadelphia Inquirer in a 3/5 stars review, declared, "This is the debut solo release from Cetera, best known as the bassist from Chicago, and while he makes no daring departures from the group's formula, there are a number of appealing moments on this release. At times, only the absence of a horn section suggests that this is indeed not Chicago."

== Songs and personnel ==
All songs written by Peter Cetera, except where noted.

=== Side One ===
1. "Livin' in the Limelight" – 4:20

- Steve Lukather – lead guitar and solo
- Craig Hull – rhythm guitar
- Mike Botts – drums
- Michael Boddicker – synthesizer
- Peter Cetera – bass, percussion

2. "I Can Feel It" (Cetera, Ricky Fataar, Carl Wilson) – 3:07

- Chris Pinnick – lead guitar and solo
- Carl Wilson – rhythm guitar
- Ricky Fataar – drums
- Mark Williams – percussion
- Peter Cetera – bass

3. "How Many Times" – 4:21

- Chris Pinnick – lead guitar
- Rich Eames – electric piano
- David "Hawk" Wolinski – synthesizer and solo
- Ricky Fataar – drums
- Steve Foreman – percussion
- Peter Cetera – bass, acoustic guitar

4. "Holy Moly" – 4:25

- Chris Pinnick – electric guitar
- Steve Lukather – electric guitar
- Ricky Fataar – drums, percussion
- Tommy Morgan – harmonica and solo
- Peter Cetera – bass, acoustic guitar

5. "Mona Mona" – 3:18

- Chris Pinnick – lead guitar
- Ricky Fataar – drums
- Gary Herbig – saxophone
- David "Hawk" Wolinski – synthesizer
- Peter Cetera – bass, rhythm guitar

=== Side Two ===
6. "On the Line" – 4:00

- Josh Leo – electric guitar and solo
- Craig Hull – electric guitar (Note: A typographical error in the liner notes for the 2004 re-release in compact disc format on Wounded Bird Records lists Craig Hull as Craig "Huff" on this track.)
- Kenny Edwards – acoustic guitar
- Bob Glaub – bass
- Craig Doerge – acoustic piano
- Michael Botts – drums
- Michael Boddicker – synthesizers
- Peter Cetera – percussion

7. "Not Afraid to Cry" – 3:27

- Chris Pinnick – electric 6-string guitar
- Mark Goldenberg – acoustic 12-string guitar and solo
- Ricky Fataar – drums
- Peter Cetera – bass, percussion

8. "Evil Eye" – 2:37

- Chris Pinnick – guitar, 12-string guitar
- Mark Goldenberg – 12-string guitar
- Ricky Fataar – drums
- Peter Cetera – bass, synthesizer

9. "Practical Man" – 3:49 (Note: Incorrectly listed on LP label as 4:49.)

- Chris Pinnick – guitar
- Craig Hull – guitar
- William "Smitty" Smith – organ
- David "Hawk" Wolinski – synthesizers
- Ricky Fataar – drums
- Peter Cetera – bass, percussion, vocoder, synthesizer
- Horns – written by Peter Cetera; arranged by Roland Vazquez

10. "Ivy Covered Walls" – 3:56

- Chris Pinnick – guitar and solo
- Carli Munoz – acoustic piano
- Ricky Fataar – drums
- Peter Cetera – bass, percussion

Song listing and personnel from vinyl LP liner notes.

== Charts ==
Chart (1982)	Peak position
Swedish Albums (Sverigetopplistan)	38
US Billboard 200	143
