= Dominic Sena =

American film director (born 1949)

- Born: April 26, 1949 (age 77); Niles, Ohio, U.S.
- Occupations: Film director, music video director
- Years active: 1984–2011

Dominic Sena (born April 26, 1949) is an American retired film director and music video director. As a film director, he is best known for directing the films Kalifornia (1993), Gone in 60 Seconds (2000), and Swordfish (2001). As a music video director, he directed music videos for Richard Marx, Bryan Adams, Peter Cetera, Janet Jackson, and Sting.

== Life and career ==
Sena was born in Niles, Ohio of Italian-American heritage. His family hails from the town of Bagnoli Irpino, Avellino, Italy. As one of the founders of Propaganda Films, Sena worked primarily in music videos early in his career. He directed several of Janet Jackson's image re-defining music videos from her Rhythm Nation 1814 album. The Rhythm Nation 1814 short film directed by Sena won the Grammy Award Best Long Form Music Video. Other artists that Sena has directed music videos for include Richard Marx, Tina Turner, Fleetwood Mac, Sheena Easton, Bryan Adams, Michael Bolton, Peter Cetera, E. G. Daily, and Sting. Sena was also the cinematographer for many of the music videos he directed.

In 1993, Sena directed Kalifornia, which starred future Hollywood stars Brad Pitt and David Duchovny. While the film garnered good reviews, it was not a commercial success and it was seven more years before Sena stepped behind the camera again.

In 2000, Sena directed the film Gone in 60 Seconds, featuring Nicolas Cage, Angelina Jolie, and Robert Duvall. Other films he has directed include Swordfish (2001), Whiteout (2009), and Season of the Witch (2011).

== Filmography ==
- Rhythm Nation 1814 (1989)
- Kalifornia (1993)
- Gone in 60 Seconds (2000)
- Swordfish (2001)
- 13 Graves (2006)
- Whiteout (2009)
- Season of the Witch (2011)

== Videography ==
- "I Need You", Maurice White (1985)
- "Say It, Say It", E.G. Daily (1986)
- "No Easy Way Out", Robert Tepper (1986)
- "Don't Walk Away", Robert Tepper (1986)
- "Shake You Down", Gregory Abbott (1986)
- "The Next Time I Fall", Peter Cetera & Amy Grant (1986)
- "Top Gun Anthem", Harold Faltermeyer & Steve Stevens (1986)
- "Big Mistake", Peter Cetera (1987)
- "Let's Wait Awhile", Janet Jackson (1987)
- "Listen to the Beat of a Heart", The Burns Sisters (1987)
- "Flash in Japan", Yazawa (1987)
- "Don't Mean Nothing", Richard Marx (1987)
- "The Pleasure Principle", Janet Jackson (1987)
- "Should've Known Better", Richard Marx (1987)
- "They Dance Alone", Sting (1987)
- "Little Lies", Fleetwood Mac (1987)
- "Victim of Love", Bryan Adams (1987)
- "Indian Summer", The Dream Academy (1987)
- "Don't You Want Me", Jody Watley (1987)
- "The Lover in Me", Sheena Easton (1988)
- "Why'd You Lie?", Colin James (1988)
- "Get to You", Dan Reed Network (1988)
- "Fragile", Sting (1988)
- "I Wish You Were Here", Tease (1988)
- "Don't Say It's Love", Johnny Hates Jazz (1988)
- "Don't Walk Away", Toni Childs (1988)
- "Satisfied", Richard Marx (1989)
- "Miss You Much", Janet Jackson (1989)
- "Rhythm Nation", Janet Jackson (1989)
- "I Don't Wanna Lose You", Tina Turner (1989)
- "Heartbeat of Love", Pia Zadora (1989)
- "Come Back to Me", Janet Jackson (1990)
- "Headlights on the Parade", The Blue Nile (1990)
- "Talk to Me", Anita Baker (1990)
- "I'll Be Your Shelter", Taylor Dayne (1990)
- "More", The Sisters of Mercy (1990)
- "One Shot", Tin Machine (1991)
- "Love Is a Wonderful Thing", Michael Bolton (1991)
- "If", Janet Jackson (1993)
