= Glory of Love (Peter Cetera song) =

1986 single by Peter Cetera

Single by Peter Cetera

from the album Solitude/Solitaire and The Karate Kid Part II
- B-side: "On the Line"
- Released: May 1986
- Length: 4:26 (album version); 5:02 (extended version)
- Label: Full Moon; Warner Bros.
- Songwriters: Peter Cetera; David Foster; Diane Nini
- Producer: Michael Omartian

Peter Cetera singles chronology
| "Livin' in the Limelight" (1981) | "Glory of Love" (1986) | "The Next Time I Fall" (1986) |

"Glory of Love" is a song performed by American musician Peter Cetera, which he wrote and composed with his then-wife Diane Nini, and David Foster. The song was recorded by Cetera shortly after he left the band Chicago to pursue a solo career. Featured in the film The Karate Kid Part II (1986), it was Cetera's first hit single after he left the band, reaching number one on the US Billboard Hot 100,< and it was included on his album Solitude/Solitaire (1986), which Michael Omartian produced. It is also the second single to be released by Cetera, following "Livin' in the Limelight".

"Glory of Love" peaked at number one on the US Billboard Hot 100 chart on August 2, 1986, remaining in that spot for two weeks. It also spent five weeks atop the US Adult Contemporary chart. Billboard ranked the power ballad as number fourteen on the Top Pop Singles of 1986, and number four on the Top Adult Contemporary Singles of 1986. The song achieved similar success in the UK, peaking at number three on the UK singles chart, where it was the 26th best-selling single of 1986.

== Release and reception ==
"Glory of Love" made its first appearance on the Billboard Hot 100 in the US at number 62, for the week ending on June 7, 1986, and debuted at number 59 on the Cash Box Top 100 Singles chart that same date. In the same issue, Cash Box also showed the single as a new release.

The single has not been certified gold or platinum by the RIAA, although the album that it appeared on, Solitude/Solitaire, has been certified both gold and platinum.

The song earned nominations for an Academy Award for Best Original Song, and a Golden Globe in the category of Best Original Song. It was also nominated for a Grammy Award in 1987 for Best Pop Vocal Performance by a Male Artist, and went on to win an ASCAP Award for Most Performed Songs from a Motion Picture and a BMI Film & TV Award for Most Performed Song from a Film.

== Background ==
Cetera has said that he originally wrote and composed "Glory of Love" as the end title for the film Rocky IV (1985), but it was passed over by United Artists, instead ultimately being used as the theme for The Karate Kid Part II (1986).

The single of "Glory of Love" and the accompanying video were released in May 1986, while the album, Solitude/Solitaire, was released within days of the release of the film, The Karate Kid Part II, a month later. Upon its release, the song was often incorrectly credited as being a new song performed by Cetera's former band Chicago owing to its similarity in style to many of the band's popular songs for which Cetera had been the lead vocalist.

Cetera performed a shortened version of the song live at the 59th Academy Awards ceremony, which took place on Monday, March 30, 1987, at the Dorothy Chandler Pavilion.

== Music video ==
The music video by Peter Cetera is set in a Japanese martial arts dojo, with cut and fade scenes of the film The Karate Kid Part II throughout. The video was directed by Peter Sinclair.

== B-side ==
The song "On the Line" which is on the B-side of the 45 rpm single is from Cetera's eponymously named first solo album Peter Cetera, which was released in 1981.

== Charts ==
=== Weekly charts ===
Weekly chart performance for "Glory of Love"
| Chart (1986–1987) | Peak position |
|---|---|
| Australia (Kent Music Report) | 9 |
| Austria (Ö3 Austria Top 40) | 11 |
| Belgium (Ultratop 50 Flanders) | 19 |
| Canada Retail Singles (The Record) | 1 |
| Canada Top Singles (RPM) | 1 |
| Canada Adult Contemporary (RPM) | 1 |
| Netherlands (Dutch Top 40) | 21 |
| Netherlands (Single Top 100) | 18 |
| New Zealand (Recorded Music NZ) | 25 |
| Norway (VG-lista) | 2 |
| Panama (UPI) | 1 |
| Sweden (Sverigetopplistan) | 1 |
| Switzerland (Schweizer Hitparade) | 5 |
| UK Singles (Official Charts) | 3 |
| US Billboard Hot 100 | 1 |
| US Adult Contemporary (Billboard) | 1 |
| West Germany (GfK) | 24 |

=== Year-end charts ===
Year-end chart performance for "Glory of Love"
| Chart (1986) | Rank |
|---|---|
| Australia (Kent Music Report) | 64 |
| Canada Top Singles (RPM) | 16 |
| Europe (European Hot 100 Singles) | 66 |
| Netherlands (Single Top 100) | 88 |
| UK Singles (OCC) | 26 |
| US Billboard Hot 100 | 14 |

== Certifications ==
Certifications and sales for "Glory of Love"
| Region | Certification | Certified units/sales |
|---|---|---|
| United Kingdom (BPI) | Silver | 250,000^{^} |
^{^} Shipments figures based on certification alone.

== Cover versions ==
- In 2000, American punk band New Found Glory covered the song on their EP From the Screen to Your Stereo which consisted entirely of covers of songs from motion picture soundtracks.
- In 2000, Singer-Actress Jessa Zaragoza featured the song as a duet with her Husband Dingdong Avanzado. In the album “Ibigay Mo Na”
- In 2010, Canadian artist Zameer released an acoustic version of the song on his album From Under the Bleachers. The single reached number 73 on the Canadian Hot 100 chart.

== References in other media ==
- "Glory of Love" was performed as the finale of the Irish stage show Riot in 2018 in Sydney, Australia.
- "Glory of Love" plays while a woman runs over a man with a minivan in season 2, episode 3 of the NBC broadcast television series, Good Girls. The episode first aired on March 17, 2019.

== See also ==
- List of Hot Adult Contemporary number ones of 1986
