= Love Me Tomorrow =

Single by Chicago

from the album Chicago 16
- B-side: "Bad Advice"
- Released: September 1, 1982
- Recorded: 1982
- Genre: Soft rock
- Length: 5:06 (original album version); 4:58 (2002 remastered album version); 3:56 (single edit)
- Label: Full Moon; Warner Bros.
- Songwriters: Peter Cetera; David Foster
- Producer: David Foster

Chicago singles chronology
"Hard to Say I'm Sorry" (1982)	"Love Me Tomorrow" (1982)	"What You're Missing" (1983)

"Love Me Tomorrow" is a song written by Peter Cetera and David Foster for the group Chicago and recorded for their album Chicago 16 (1982), with Cetera singing lead vocals. The second single released from the album, it reached No. 22 on the U.S. Billboard Hot 100 chart and No. 8 on the adult contemporary chart. Songwriter Cetera, a member of the American Society of Composers, Authors and Publishers (ASCAP), won an ASCAP Pop Music Award for the song in the category, Most Performed Songs.

On the Canadian pop singles chart, "Love Me Tomorrow" reached only as high as No. 35. However, on the Adult Contemporary chart it peaked at No. 2.

== Versions ==
The version of "Love Me Tomorrow" featured on the original Chicago 16 album (also on early Greatest Hits albums featuring the tune) has a length of 5:06. However, on the 2002 remastered edition of Chicago 16, two measures of music are excised from the string-heavy opening sequence for the song's instrumental bridge (essentially, the repetition of the first two measures of the sequence is eliminated), decreasing the length of the track to approximately 4:58. However, subsequent re-releases of Chicago 16 have restored the full original versions of "Love Me Tomorrow" and "What You're Missing" (which had been replaced with its single version on the 2002 remaster).

The single version of the song clocks in at just under four minutes, cutting the extended instrumental outro.

== Reception ==
Cashbox called the song "a very melodramatic piece that can't fail to capture pop attention." Billboard said that it "reaches for more drama through punched-up guitar accents and a more impassioned vocal."

== Music video ==
Chicago made a music video for the song, which according to Cetera, was shot in one day.

== Charts ==
Chart (1982–83)	Peak position
Australia KMR	82
Canada RPM Top Singles	35
Canada RPM Adult Contemporary	2
New Zealand	50
US Billboard Hot 100	22
US Billboard Adult Contemporary	8
US Cash Box Top 100	22
