= Rhythm Nation 1814 (film) =

1989 short film starring Janet Jackson

- VHS cover
- Created by: Janet Jackson
- Written by: Janet Jackson; Dominic Sena; René Elizondo; Noah Stern
- Directed by: Dominic Sena
- Starring: Janet Jackson; Josh Miller; Tyrin Turner
- Music by: Janet Jackson; Jimmy Jam and Terry Lewis; Thomas Newman (score)
- Country of origin: United States
- Original language: English

Production
- Producer: Aris McGarry
- Running time: 30 minutes
- Production company: JDJ Entertainment; Propaganda Films; A&M Records

Original release
- Network: MTV
- Release: September 16, 1989

Rhythm Nation 1814 is a 1989 American musical short film based on Janet Jackson's fourth studio album of the same name. Directed by Dominic Sena, the film notably includes the music video for "Rhythm Nation", as well as the videos for "Miss You Much" and "The Knowledge". It was filmed at the Bradbury Building in Los Angeles and the Glenarm Power Plant in Pasadena, California. The video is notable for its "dystopian" warehouse setting, the unisex black military-style uniforms in which Jackson and her dancers were outfitted, and its choreography, considered to "set the template for hundreds of videos to come in the 1990s and 2000s". The film premiered on MTV on September 16, 1989, coinciding with the release of the album, and was later released on VHS and LaserDisc by A&M Video.

It won multiple accolades, including MTV's Video Vanguard Award for Jackson's impact on entertainment. Various actors and choreographers, including Wade Robson and Travis Payne, have cited Jackson and the "Rhythm Nation" routine as a major influence on their careers. Entertainment Weekly considered the video "legendary", and Rolling Stone included it in a list of 10 Favorite Dancing Musicians, calling Jackson "a brilliant dancer". The publication also titled it "the gold standard for dystopian dance pop music videos", featuring "some of the most memorable choreography in pop video history".

The long-form video won a Grammy Award for Best Long Form Music Video in 1990. The home video release has been certified two-times platinum by the Recording Industry Association of America (RIAA) for shipments of 200,000 units.

== Plot ==
In a dark, dystopian city, teenagers B. J. and Kickdrum are aspiring musicians struggling to make ends meet; while B. J. shines shoes for a living, he is concerned about Kickdrum making calls at the phone booth and declining any chances of them doing any rehearsals. Janet Jackson pays them a visit and invites them over to hang out at her clubhouse, but Kickdrum declines, lying to her about rehearsing. She returns to her clubhouse, where she and some of her friends do a performance of "Miss You Much". As they take a break to watch cartoons, Janet suddenly senses something wrong.

Back at the shoe shine, a man arrives and gives Kickdrum a package before taking a seat to have B. J. shine his shoes. Suddenly, a car passes by and the occupant guns down B. J. and the man. A horrified Kickdrum drops the package and runs away. Frustrated by her failure to prevent the incident, Janet heads to the rooftop before she and her friends dance to "The Knowledge". Kickdrum arrives at the boiler room of the building, where he sees Janet and her group all dressed in black military uniforms, performing "Rhythm Nation" before disappearing. As Kickdrum picks up a metal plate labeled "1814", Janet appears and embraces him, ensuring him everything will be okay.

== Cast ==
- Janet Jackson as herself
- Josh Miller as B. J. (Boy with Harmonica)
- Tyrin Turner as Kickdrum (Boy in Phone Booth)
- Michael Meintzelman as the Plackard Man
- Ezra Gabay as the Drug Courier

Terry Bixler, T. C. Diamond, Renee KIng, Tina Landon, Jimmy Locust, Karen Owens, Art Andre Palmer, Jocelyn Peden, Tiffanie Poston, Charlie Schmidt, Leavelle Smith, Anthony Thomas, Lori Werner, and Terrance Yates appear as the Rhythm Nation Dancers.

== Music ==
The Rhythm Nation 1814 film consists of the videos for "Miss You Much", "The Knowledge", and "Rhythm Nation", filmed simultaneously over 20 days. "Black Cat" is also played in the background in one scene. The video premiered in full on September 16, 1989 on MTV to high ratings, and aired several times the following week. Producer Jimmy Jam said "The concept for the half-hour, long-form video was already in the works when we recorded the album. Janet's choreographer was here, so we knew what the steps were going to be for the songs, how the story would be treated, and how the video was going to look. [...] We actually tried to make the album sound a little like the black-and-white images in the video, rather than adapting the video to the album. A lot of the music was treated almost as soundtrack."

While filming "The Knowledge", Jackson collapsed from exhaustion after filming for more than 25 consecutive hours, explaining "That's the one area where I must be careful. Sometimes I won't sleep, won't stop reviewing, won't stop searching for ways to improve the projects. The projects absorb me. When we were filming the long video, I actually collapsed." Journalist David Ritz, who attended the filming, commented "Looking at "The Knowledge", it appears that Janet's physical breakdown came at the emotional climax of the video. "Prejudice, no!" she cries, kicking and smashing windows with the anger of a soul possessed. "Ignorance, no! Bigotry, no! Illiteracy, no!" she bemoans, before falling onto the ledge of the roof, dangerously positioned on the edge, ominous clouds of change racing overhead."

The black-and-white, military-inspired "Rhythm Nation" video was directed by Dominic Sena in August 1989. It was the finale in the Rhythm Nation 1814 film, following videos for "Miss You Much" and "The Knowledge", respectively. Known for its high-octane choreography in an abandoned factory, the video won an award for Best Choreography and was nominated for Best Dance Video at the MTV Video Music Awards, where Jackson also received the MTV Video Vanguard Award. "Rhythm Nation" ranked at thirty-seven on VH1's "Greatest 100 Videos" and forty-four on MTV's "100 Greatest Videos Ever Made". The video also stars a young Tyrin Turner.

== Production ==
=== Development ===
Rhythm Nation 1814 was filmed over 20 days at the Glenarm Power Plant in Pasadena, California, and served as the finale in the series. The elevator and some interior shots were filmed at the Bradbury Building in Los Angeles. Speaking to MTV, Jackson said, "I knew who I wanted to direct 'Rhythm Nation,' that was simple: Dominic Sena. After working with him on 'Let's Wait Awhile,' I absolutely fell in love with him. [...] Dominic understood story, and he could put onscreen, from front to back, the whole picture you had in your head." Explaining the video's scenery, Jackson explained, "the foggy, smoky street and the dark, black-and-white tone, that was all intentional." The video was shot in black and white to render everyone's skin tone in shades of gray, portraying the Rhythm Nation's slogan: "We are like-minded individuals, sharing a common vision, pushing toward a world rid of color-lines." "There were so many races in that video, from Black to White and all the shades of gray in between. Black-and-white photography shows all those shades, and that's why we used it," said Jackson.

Jackson performing "Rhythm Nation" in the film, with dancers all outfitted in unisex black military-style uniforms.

"We're living in a very visual time right now," Jackson explained. "That's why videos are so important. Before, they really weren't. They play such an important part in the music business. The next is the live show. But the first thing they ever see of you is the video." Describing Jackson on the set of the video, journalist David Ritz said "For hours she obliges the camera during a grueling photography session on a sun-soaked day at the Pasadena Power Plant, [...] a mysterious and metaphorical work dramatizing the concerns of Rhythm Nation." Jackson's clothes were considered to reflect "a quiet sadness", and said she was "cooperative to a fault, yet inwardly shy".

Several label executives reportedly told Jackson the album and video wouldn't have "crossover" appeal. With Jackson's persistence, the video became "the most far-reaching single project the company has ever attempted". In a later interview, Jackson said "The concept basically was very industrial black and white, not wanting any color brought to it" because "no color lines" was the point, so "everyone is all somewhat of the same kind of tone." "Dominic Sena directed it, it was a 20-day shoot. A lot of work, long hours." Sena commented "She's always out there trying to give people something different and fresh and exciting to look at. If it's been done before she doesn't want anything to do with it, it's like 'let's start over'.

=== Choreography ===
The choreography for the "Rhythm Nation" music video has been considered one of the most recognizable and imitated routines in pop culture. Janet Jackson discovered then-unknown choreographer Anthony Thomas and had him co-choreograph the video with her. Anthony said, "She's not a trained dancer. It comes from her soul. She's a natural. She's unbelievable." Rolling Stone included the video in a list of "10 Favorite Dancing Musicians", calling Jackson "a brilliant dancer".

The book Gender and Qualitative Methods suggested the routine represents "self-control and military discipline" – "they move in unison and in the same rhythm, dancing like roots, with stiff square arm movements," while also exhibiting elements of Asian martial arts. The Orlando Sentinel regarded Jackson to portray "Swiss-watch precision" in the routine. Slant Magazine said the clip "anointed Janet the ambassador of intricately choreographed" music videos, placing it among "the most intricately and powerfully choreographed music videos of all time". The Guardian said the routine was "made famous by its memorably routine-infested video", and also described as "an aerobic goose step" by The New York Times. BET ranked the video as having the "Best Dance Moves in a Music Video" in 2013.

Another critique stated "most of the video consists of Jackson with background dancers performing a synchronized dance routine. Judging by the serious facial expressions and vigorous body movements of Jackson and her dancers, the men and women in "Rhythm Nation" are confident and courageous, and display unmatched conviction." Jackson and her dancers were analyzed to "march toward the camera in a dominating manner" while simultaneously "performing moves that most humans could not accomplish without a personal trainer and lots of free time on their hands."

=== Fashion ===
The outfit worn for the "Rhythm Nation" video and performances of the song is well known in popular culture. Jackson's appearance includes "a fearless red-lipped pout and long black ponytail", along with "a black baseball hat with a metal "1814" appliqué, a black military-style shirt jacket with silver buckles and faux leather straps and collar, black belted pants and chunky, strappy boots." The design was inspired by the Firemen's uniform in the 1966 film Fahrenheit 451. An additional anecdote from The New York Times noted "Ms. Jackson, done up in black military-inspired garb, was eager to rail against societal ills like racism and domestic abuse."

Jackson was often questioned about her black attire and uniforms, "Wearing black shows that for once that you can represent something positive and not negative," she emphasized. Jackson recalled being hurt over the comments of an African-American critic who considered her black attire "drab", saying "I would hope that everyone will understand that for once black represents something good. That's why I decided the color scheme for Rhythm Nation – the costumes, the cover art, the overall feeling – would be positive and uncompromisingly Black."

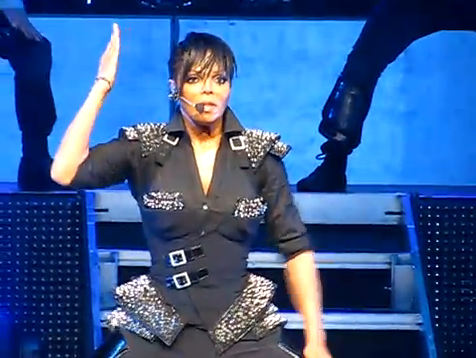
Jackson performing "Rhythm Nation" on the Number Ones, Up Close and Personal tour, 2011.

Chris Ryan of MTV praised Jackson's look as trendsetting, saying "Janet took her place at the top of the trendsetting heap". Julianne Escobedo Shepherd of MTV Style spoke about its influence, recalling that "everyone wanted to dress like her" and dance classes would "dedicate hours" to the video's choreography. An additional critique described the video's wardrobe as "intimidating" and "uniform fetish", likened to "some type of dark-ops cadet corps". Essence also praised Jackson as a trendsetter, commenting "she started her own movement with the hoop earrings with the single key". Retail outlet Karmaloop called Jackson's snapback hat "1980s signature style", selling a hat based on Jackson's. MTV credited the hat worn in the video as one of the reasons for the snapback hat's revival in popularity.

In 2011, Entertainment Weekly included the outfit at number nineteen on a list of 50 Stars Who Rocked Fashion, commenting Jackson adopted a "crisp military look for the ladies—with epaulets, cadet caps, fierce tailoring." In 2013, Lucky Magazine ranked the video among "The 18 Most Stylishly Influential Music Videos of All Time". The same year, Cosmopolitan listed "Rhythm Nation" among the "10 Most Iconic Music Video Looks of the 80s". In 2013, Alexander Fury of The Independent called Jackson a "style icon", saying "the artwork created with Eighties illustrator Tony Viramontes for Control stands the test of time, as does the video for 1989's "Rhythm Nation", adding he was "obsessed" with the video's "get-up of quasi-military uniform accessorized with a single key on a hoop earring."

== Themes ==
The themes of unity among dancers of various ethnicities, as well as gender equality, have received praise from critics. Slant Magazine observed "The solidarity of Janet Jackson's multi-racial Rhythm Nation dancers is evoked with hyper-synchronized movements while their individuality is expressed via their separate, distinct dances." The New York Times praised Jackson as a feminist, describing it as "a far cry from the lascivious bodies in various states of undress that flood the channel". 34th Street Magazine applauded the video's implication of gender neutrality. The clip's theme of activism and leadership was also commended, writing "instead of using sexual elements to attract audiences, it portrays the strong bond between entertainers and social activists with a common goal", in an attempt to speak "particularly to young people and encourages them to be the leaders of tomorrow. Jackson passes on the message of social activist Mahatma Gandhi who once said, “You must be the change you wish to see in the world."

The video features dancers of "African-American, Caucasian, and Asian ancestry", aiding Jackson in becoming known for "breaking existing racial stereotypes specifically toward African-American women", depicting her as a "socially responsible citizen with dignity and grace". The backing dancers in the video were thought to represent "social activists", shrouded by "empty surroundings" deciphered as "the indifferent attitudes in society". Jackson and her dancers were considered "confident, courageous", and displaying "unmatched conviction".

The video's director was noted to construct Jackson as "a creative, intelligent professional, someone who aims at promoting the status of black people, especially women". Dressed in identical uniforms, Jackson and the dancers "move in unison and in the same rhythm, dancing like roots, with stiff square arm movements. ... Jackson is also dressed in a uniform and is performing asexually and almost anonymously in front of, but as one of the members of the group." The video was also one of the only popular music videos considered suitable to be broadcast to US troops in Middle Eastern countries such as Saudi Arabia and the Persian Gulf, due to religious restrictions on the portrayal of female sexuality.

== Reception ==
The video received favorable reviews from critics and journalists, who focused on its theme of unity and its choreography. Comparing Lady Gaga to Jackson, Kyle Anderson of MTV News described it as "the clip that sent Jackson into the stratosphere as an envelope-pushing pop star." It won a Grammy Award for Best Long Form Music Video in 1990.

"Shot in stark black and white and set in a smokey, oppressive factory setting, Jackson leads what appears to be a hip paramilitary organization through some of the most memorable choreography in pop video history. The future may look bleak, but at least it's funky." – Rolling Stone

"Janet's dance nation is a hard, angular, geometric battle plan, and as the title track's stunning, monochromatic video clip confirms, the schematic first calls for an almost Zen-like transcendence of self." – Slant Magazine

Entertainment Weekly called the video "legendary", and Rolling Stone included it in a list of "10 Favorite Dancing Musicians", calling Jackson "a brilliant dancer" who has "arguably had a greater long-term impact on the choreography of contemporary music videos" than Michael Jackson. The publication added the video "set the template for hundreds of videos to come in the 1990s and 2000s." It was also included in a list of the "Ten Best Apocalyptic Dance Music Videos" in 2011, heralded as "the gold standard for dystopian dance-pop music videos" which features "some of the most memorable choreography in pop video history". The Sun Sentinel called it "dark, futuristic", and "unforgettable", adding "No one can witness the militaristic precision of Rhythm Nation, which gives the impression that a really angry pep squad has taken over the dance floor, and not see how Janet's style has been sampled, borrowed and stolen over and over ... and over."

In 2013, Cosmopolitan listed it among the "10 Most Iconic Music Video Looks of the 80s", saying "How do you step out from behind the shadow of the world’s biggest pop star? You strap on some black, wear a key as an earring and dance like you’re going to war." Slant Magazine ranked the video among the "100 Greatest Music Videos", calling the "stunning, monochromatic" video it "one of the most intricately and powerfully choreographed music videos of all time", saying "the solidarity of Janet Jackson's multi-racial Rhythm Nation dancers is evoked with hyper-synchronized movements while their individuality is expressed via their separate, distinct dances." Additional commentary said the clip "wasn’t the norm for most things in the 80s, let alone a pop music video." Another review considered it "groundbreaking" and "famous for its dynamic choreography in an abandoned factory", exclaiming "Fast-paced and bold, viewers become hooked to the catchy tunes and soulful sounds of the groundbreaking dance video."

Elena Gooray of 34th Street Magazine praised the video's overall theme, concept, and wardrobe. Music journalist Richard Croft considered it "captivating", saying "It is incredible, one of the top five music videos ever made." Croft added, "I've never seen dancing like that in a video, and no matter how many times I see it, I can never look away. It's captivating. 'Rhythm Nation' is the most empowering, come-on-get-up song in the world."

Rolling Stone described the full-length piece as a "mini-musical" which "told the morality tale of two shoeshine boys who discover the Rhythm Nation". The New York Times stated the plot "juxtaposes her dance routines with grim urban imagery and a plot line about drugs versus dreams". Chris Willman of the Los Angeles Times considered it "ambitious" and "fun", saying "The "can-humans-really-do-that?" choreography in the three dance numbers is on par with, and may even top, the best of brother Michael's hoof-happy videos". Willman added, "What connects these numbers is an anti-drug story, unfortunately bolstered by the glitziness-among-the-L.A.-ruins imagery of "Blade Runner." Director Dominic Sena's "slick penchant for neat futuristic grime" was also praised, adding "the big-bass songs and the dazzling dancing say what the hokey script can't."

== Certifications ==
Region	Certification	Certified units/sales
United States (RIAA)	2× Platinum	200,000^{^}
^{^} Shipments figures based on certification alone.
