= The Next Time I Fall =

Single by Peter Cetera and Amy Grant

from the album Solitude/Solitaire
- B-side: "Holy Moly"
- Released: September 1986
- Recorded: 1986
- Genre: Pop
- Length: 3:47 (remix); 3:46 (album version); 4:30 (extended version)
- Label: Full Moon; Warner Bros.
- Songwriters: Bobby Caldwell; Paul Gordon
- Producer: Michael Omartian

Peter Cetera singles chronology
"Glory of Love" (1986)	"The Next Time I Fall" (1986)	"Big Mistake" (1986)

Amy Grant singles chronology
"Stay for Awhile" (1986)	"The Next Time I Fall" (1986)	"Saved by Love" (1988)

Music video
- "The Next Time I Fall" on YouTube

"The Next Time I Fall" is a song written by Bobby Caldwell and Paul Gordon and recorded by a duet of Peter Cetera and Amy Grant for Cetera's 1986 album Solitude/Solitaire. It reached number one on Billboard magazine's Hot 100 and Adult Contemporary chart and was nominated for a Grammy Award for Best Pop Performance by a Duo or Group with Vocals. In February 2020, it was listed on a Billboard pop music list of top 25 love song duets.

Upon its release as a single, Cash Box said the Cetera/Grant team achieved "... sparkling results. Grant’s harmonies perfectly compliment Cetera’s trademark ballad stylings in this strong duet."

== Background ==
Songwriter Paul Gordon recalled working on the project with Bobby Caldwell. "Bobby had just moved into a new apartment, and all he had was a drum machine and a chair. We spent a couple of inspired days knocking out that song. It was a lot of fun working with Bobby." The feeling was mutual for Caldwell: "Yes, writing with Paul was a great experience. Sometimes these collaborations click and sometimes not, but this was a smooth and painless venture."

Gordon explained that Caldwell did the vocals on the demo and that they wrote the song for Cetera to sing. "And even when he was no longer in Chicago we decided to stick with him." Caldwell confirmed, "We did indeed write the song for Chicago and their lead vocalist Peter Cetera. We had his voice in mind, but Paul and I were unaware that he was leaving Chicago at that time, and when we heard the news our hopes were dashed. However, a short time later, I got a call at home from Cetera himself who stumbled upon our demo cassette tape of the song in producer/arranger David Foster's office. He loved the tune and wanted to record it as a duet. It was simply meant to be—the song landed with the singer we wanted." Gordon also felt the project had a happy ending. "It was an accidental duet, meaning it was never intended to be a duet—but the producers found ways to make it a duet, which ended up working out pretty well."

Now, it was a matter of Cetera deciding who would be his singing partner. "'I was looking for somebody who wasn't that logical a choice,' he explained. 'Actually, I was going to use an "unknown" singer until someone at my record company suggested Amy Grant,'" who had thus far only been known for Contemporary Christian music. "I thought she was a great choice because she was looking to make a pop crossover, and I like what she stands for. She was real excited about the idea, too." However, Grant still had reservations. Caldwell noted, "Cetera really wanted her to record the duet with him, but she was so devoutly religious that she wanted to vet the songwriters before she would commit to recording the song. I had to go to A&M Records to meet with her. Obviously, I was on my very best behavior that day [he laughs]. I'm sure Paul had to go through the same process."

== Music video ==
After the song was recorded, a music video was filmed at the Park Plaza Hotel in downtown Los Angeles, California, under the direction of Dominic Sena. The clip consists of shots of Cetera and Grant's lip-syncing that are interwoven with footage of the movements of a large group of dancers. The video made it up to at least No. 7 on the Cash Box list of top 40 music videos.

== Personnel ==
- Peter Cetera – vocals
- Amy Grant – vocals
- Michael Omartian – keyboards
- Willie Alexander – Fairlight CMI
- Steve Azbill – PPG Waveterm programming
- Erich Bulling – synthesizers, drum programming
- Dann Huff – guitars
- Chester Thompson – drums
- Jeff Porcaro – percussion
- Kenny Cetera – additional percussion

== Chart success ==
"The Next Time I Fall" debuted on the Hot 100 in the issue of Billboard dated September 20, 1986, and remained on the chart for 21 weeks, one of which was spent at number one. Its first appearance on the magazine's Adult Contemporary chart followed in the September 27 issue and resulted in two weeks in the top spot during a run that lasted 22 weeks.

== Charts ==
Weekly chart performance for "The Next Time I Fall" by Peter Cetera and Amy Grant
Chart (1986–1987)	Peak position
Australia (Kent Music Report)	90
Canada Adult Contemporary (RPM)	1
Canada Pop (RPM)	1
New Zealand (Recorded Music NZ)	36
UK Singles (Official Charts)	78
US Adult Contemporary (Billboard AC)	1
US Billboard Hot 100	1
US Cashbox Top 100	3

Year-end chart performance for "The Next Time I Fall" by Peter Cetera and Amy Grant
Chart	Rank
Canada (RPM, 1986)	44
US Adult Contemporary (Billboard, 1987)	39
US Billboard Hot 100, 1987	28

== Cover versions ==
Caldwell recorded the song for his 1988 album Heart of Mine.

== Bibliography ==
- Leszczak, Bob (2016), Dynamic Duets: The Best Pop Collaborations from 1955 to 1999, Rowman & Littlefield, ISBN 9781442271494
- O'Neil, Thomas (1999), The Grammys, Perigree Books, ISBN 0-399-52477-0
- Whitburn, Joel (2007), Joel Whitburn Presents Billboard Top Adult Songs, 1961-2006, Record Research Inc., ISBN 978-0898201697
- Whitburn, Joel (2009), Joel Whitburn's Top Pop Singles, 1955-2008, Record Research Inc., ISBN 978-0898201802
