= Season of the Witch (2011 film) =

2011 American film directed by Dominic Sena

- Relativity's theatrical release poster
- Directed by: Dominic Sena
- Written by: Bragi F. Schut
- Produced by: Charles Roven; Alex Gartner
- Starring: Nicolas Cage; Ron Perlman; Stephen Campbell Moore; Claire Foy; Stephen Graham; Ulrich Thomsen; Robert Sheehan; Christopher Lee
- Cinematography: Amir Mokri
- Edited by: Mark Helfrich; Dan Zimmerman; Bob Ducsay
- Music by: Atli Örvarsson
- Production companies: Atlas Entertainment; Relativity Media
- Distributed by: Relativity Media; Rogue
- Release dates: January 4, 2011 (New York premiere); January 7, 2011 (United States)
- Running time: 95 minutes
- Country: United States
- Language: English
- Budget: $40 million
- Box office: $91.6 million

Season of the Witch is a 2011 American supernatural action-adventure film directed by Dominic Sena, written by Bragi Schut, and starring Nicolas Cage and Ron Perlman. Cage and Perlman star as Teutonic Knights who return from the Crusades to find their homeland devastated by the Black Death. Two church elders accuse a young woman (Claire Foy) of being a witch responsible for the plague. They command the two knights to transport her to a distant monastery so the monks can lift her curse. The film reunited Sena and Cage, who had previously worked together on Gone in 60 Seconds.

Development on the film began in 2000 when Schut's spec script was purchased by MGM. The project moved from MGM to Columbia Pictures to Relativity Media, where the film was finally produced by Charles Roven and Alex Gartner. Filming took place primarily in Austria, Hungary, and Croatia. Season of the Witch was released on January 7, 2011, in the United States, Canada, and several other territories.

== Plot ==
In the 13th century Villach, three women are accused by a priest of witchcraft, and are first hanged before being drowned. The priest performs a ritual on the three women using a book inscribed from the Key of Solomon so they can never return to life, but one of the women takes on a demonic appearance, sets the book on fire, and hangs the priest.

In the 14th century, German Teutonic Knights Sir Behmen von Bleibruck and Sir Felson join the Smyrniote crusades. After witnessing a civilian massacre during the capture of Smyrna, the two abandon their order and return to Austria.

Traveling through Styria, Behmen and Felson encounter people infected with the Black Death. They are trying to conceal their identities as deserters, but Behmen's sword crest exposes them. They are arrested and taken to Cardinal D'Ambroise, who is near death from the plague. The Cardinal asks the knights to escort an alleged witch who is suspected of causing the pestilence to a remote monastery where monks can perform a sacred ritual to cancel her powers and stop the plague. Behmen refuses, so D'Ambroise imprisons him and Felson, where they meet the alleged witch, Anna.

Both knights agree under the condition that she be given a fair trial and the charges of desertion against them be dropped. The Cardinal agrees, and they are accompanied by the priest Debelzaq, the altar boy Kay von Wollenbart, Johann, the captain of the Cardinal's Guard, and Hagamar, a well-traveled swindler who will serve as their guide in return for his pardon. Anna shows hatred towards Debelzaq while forming a connection with Behmen.

The group camps for the night, and when Johann decides to give up the mission and to convince the others to do the same, Anna attacks him, grabs his key to her cage, and escapes. The search for her leads the group to a mass grave, where Johann begins having visions of his dead daughter calling to him until he accidentally impales himself on Kay's drawn sword. When Anna is recaptured, she explains that she only ran away for fear of Debelzaq. They cross an old, crumbling suspension bridge, where Anna saves Kay from falling, grabbing him with unnatural strength. The group enters the dark forest, where Hagamar attempts to kill Anna, only to be stopped by the others. Anna appears to summon packs of wolves, which chase the group and kill Hagamar. An enraged Behmen tries to kill her, but is stopped by Debelzaq and Felson, who point to their destination on a nearby summit.

At the monastery, the men discover that all the monks have succumbed to the plague. They locate the ancient Book of Solomon, filled with the holy rituals used to defeat evil. Debelzaq begins speaking the ritual used on witches, just as Anna, in a demonic voice, begins recounting Behmen's horror at Crusader cruelties. Realizing that she is not a witch, but has been possessed by a demon, he frantically performs an exorcism. The demon possessing Anna melts the cage's metal and escapes while fighting off the knights. When Debelzaq throws a container of holy water on it, the demon flies away.

As the men search for it, they realize it is not trying to escape, but to destroy the book so that nothing can kill it. They find a room where the monks were making copies for others to use. The demon destroys the copies and possesses the dead monks to use as weapons. The three men fight the monks' possessed corpses, as Debelzaq continues the exorcism ritual. The demon snaps Debelzaq's neck and incinerates Felson. As Kay continues the ritual, weakening it, Behmen fights the demon and is mortally wounded. Kay finishes the exorcism ritual, and the demon is consumed by holy fire, and leaves Anna. Behmen asks Kay to keep Anna safe just before he dies. After their fallen friends are buried, Anna asks Kay to tell her about the men who saved her. They both leave the monastery, with the Book of Solomon safely in Kay's possession.

== Cast ==
- Nicolas Cage as Behmen
- Ron Perlman as Felson
- Stephen Campbell Moore as Debelzaq
- Claire Foy as Anna (credited as The Girl)
- Stephen Graham as Hagamar
- Ulrich Thomsen as Johan Eckhardt
- Robert Sheehan as Kay Von Wollenbart
- Christopher Lee as Cardinal D'Ambroise

== Production ==
=== Development and filming ===
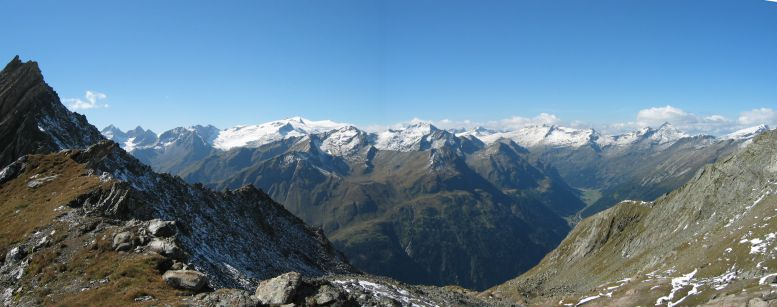
Part of the principal photography took place in the Austrian Alps

Screenwriter Bragi F. Schut wrote Season of the Witch as a spec script; in 2003, the script won Schut the Nicholl Fellowship, the single most prestigious award for an unproduced screenplay. The script was placed on the open market in 2000. Numerous studios bid on the script, and producers Charles Roven and Alex Gartner collaborated with the studio MGM to place a winning bid. MGM could not find traction to produce the film, and in 2003–2004 the studio "was essentially obtained by a number of concerns." Columbia Pictures earmarked several properties for themselves, including Season of the Witch. The producers worked with director Dominic Sena to perform location shooting throughout Europe. They sought a 14th-century castle to use as a setting for the story; castles visited in Germany, Poland and the Czech Republic could not fit the period. With the film yet to be produced, the project eventually moved to Relativity Media, and Sena was officially attached to direct. Business and creative discussions led to avoiding too much violence or gore in the film so a broader audience could see it. Actor Nicolas Cage was considered for the starring role but was unavailable during the time of the location shooting. Cage eventually became available in 2008 and was cast in the role. He explained his interest, "I wanted to make movies that celebrated actors like Christopher Lee and Vincent Price, and the great Roger Corman classics that are unafraid to explore the paranormal and the supernatural."

The crew began production immediately after Cage finished Bad Lieutenant: Port of Call New Orleans (2009). The film had a budget of approximately US$40 million, and much of the budget was covered by Relativity with pre-sales to distributors outside the United States. Filming took place in Austria, Hungary and Croatia. Most of the principal photography took place in practical locations, with several days committed to filming on greenscreen. Scenes were filmed at Burg Kreuzenstein and on the Loser mountain. Principal photography was completed by April 2009.

Following negative test screenings, the cast and crew reunited in Louisiana to film additional scenes (mainly battle sequences), filming on greenscreen to save on travel. The reshoots were directed by an uncredited Brett Ratner.

=== Casting ===
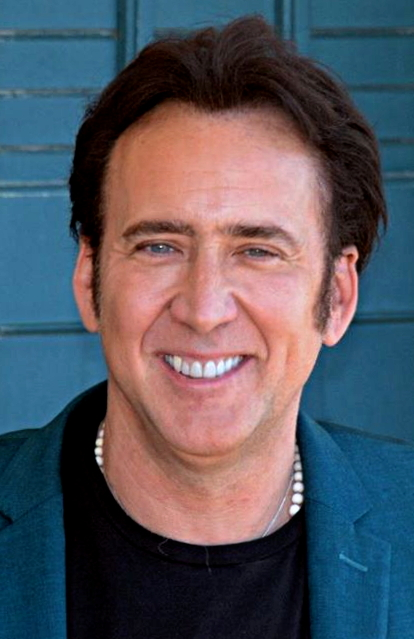
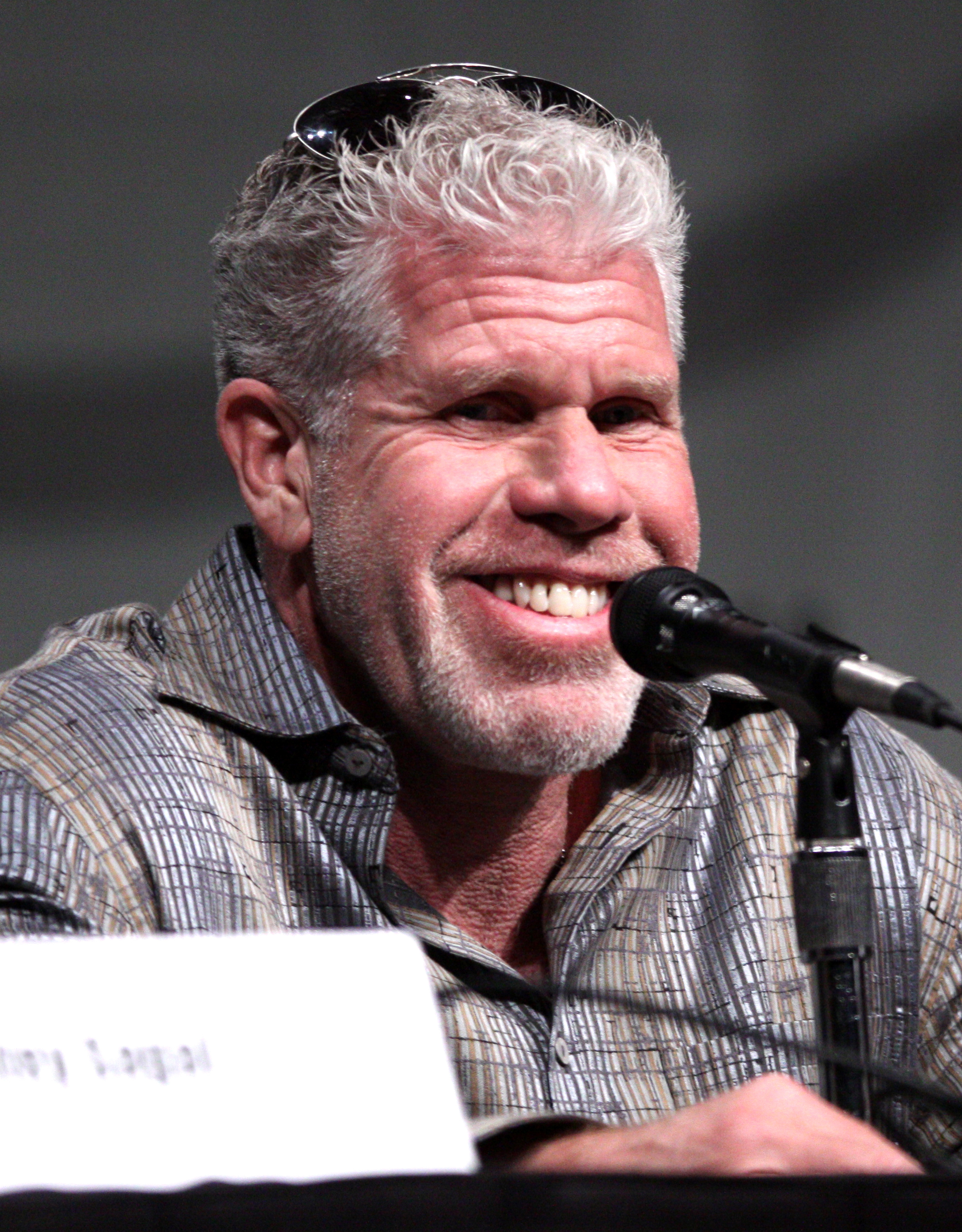
Nicolas Cage (left) and Ron Perlman (right) starred together as a double act in The Season of the Witch

Cage stars as Behman of Bleibruck, a Teutonic knight who returns from the Crusades to discover the devastation caused by the Black Plague. The actor had worked with director Dominic Sena on Gone in 60 Seconds (2000) and with producer Charles Roven on City of Angels (1998). Cage was interested in the film's fantastical subject matter, also having recently starred in The Sorcerer's Apprentice. He also described Behmen as "the first" conscientious objector, saying, "I admired... the idea of him breaking from whatever religious propaganda was forced upon him, and still finding an even closer connection with his faith and with God. Those iconoclastic elements to the character made him very interesting to me." For the role, Cage learned horseback riding from Camilla Naprous and her team of horse trainers in England. Cage also worked with a fight choreographer to learn sword fighting.

Perlman plays Felson, a knight who is Behmen's best friend and fellow combatant during the Crusades. Perlman said of choosing the role, "I love the character. I'm actually more comfortable being a sidekick, because I don't get blamed if it is a complete disaster. I really liked ... his mindset, I liked his irreverence. In the world of seriousness, he's a guy who thinks it's all bullshit. He's just in it for the whores and the sword fights." Perlman described Felson's religion, "Whereas Behmen has a very well-articulated idea of his relationship to country and church and spirituality and God, Felson has none. He doesn't bother to spend any time thinking about that."

Foy appears in her feature-film debut as the young woman who is accused of being a witch. Known for her titular role in the British miniseries Little Dorrit, she met Sena and sought the role in Season of the Witch. She explained the choice, "It's quite a manipulative role. The character does a lot of manipulating, pitting other people against each other, being quite mischievous... That was something I thought would obviously be good to do". Foy researched witchcraft and demonic possession for the role. She described its appeal, "Playing a character that was making things happen, and mainly in control of an entire group of men. And for once, be the character that is completely in the know about everything. There is nothing that she doesn't know. Nothing is a surprise. And she is able to deal with every single situation that arises the way that she sees fit. And I think that was quite refreshing to be able to play a character that wasn't entirely beholden to everyone else".

=== Visual effects ===
For Season of the Witch, Tippett Studio designed the demon that manifests in the film's climax. The art directors researched woodcuts and other artwork for classic demonic appearances. The filmmakers requested an entity "lithe and feminine", and the visual effects crew designed a demon that had "cloven feet, a dog ankle, and a fawn leg". Designing visual effects for the demon's wings was the biggest challenge since wings tend to get in the way or do not move convincingly. The filmmakers also requested holes in the demon's wings. The crew designed holes that appeared worn instead of ripped, since ripped holes would require an added billowing effect.

The demon was also designed to have dark gray skin, which presented the crew a challenge in the film's dark settings. Tippett's Blair Clark said, "We played the skin like a rotten mummy: nothing too moist, with a lot of wear marks on it". The crew's final visual effects shot was the death of the demon, and they researched previous films and terminology for how demons' deaths have been designed. They drew inspiration from Hellboy (2004), where they focused on the buildup to the demon's death. Clark said, "We built it over a series of shots so it doesn't just happen in one shot. We had little patches on the demon that start to crack and result in a glow that looks like it's burning from within".

== Release ==
Lionsgate scheduled Season of the Witch to be released on March 19, 2010, but five weeks before the date, the studio decided to pull the film from release. Lionsgate originally had an output deal with Relativity Media, but since Relativity had formed its own marketing and distribution arm in 2010, Relativity chose to release the film themselves and in October 2010 the film was pushed back a year from its original release date of March 19, 2010 to January 7, 2011. Season of the Witch was Relativity's first inhouse production.

Season of the Witch in January 2010 had been rated PG-13 by the Motion Picture Association of America, citing "thematic elements, violence, and disturbing content". The studio edited the film and re-submitted it to the MPAA in November 2010 for a new rating. The MPAA gave the film the same rating and reason for it as before.

The film had its world premiere in New York City on January 4, 2011. The film was released commercially on January 7, 2011 in several territories. Pre-release polling had indicated young men were the core demographic for the film, though more women than expected expressed interest in the film. Experts anticipated that the film would gross US$10–12 million on its opening weekend in the United States and Canada. The film was released in 2,816 theaters in the two territories. It grossed $10.6 million, ranking third at the box office after True Grit and Little Fockers, which were both released at the end of 2010. Relativity Media's exit polling showed that the audience was 52% male and that 61% were 25 years old and up. The Los Angeles Times reported that an "unusually high" 69% of the audience was nonwhite. Entertainment Weekly noted that the racial diversity of Season of the Witch's audiences was common for supernatural thrillers; the breakdown was 36% Hispanic, 31% Caucasian, 14% Asian, 10% African-American, and 9% "other". The film was the second release by Relativity and performed better than its first release, The Warrior's Way (2010). The opening weekend was not the lowest of Nicolas Cage's career to that point; it was better than The Wicker Man (2006), Next (2007) and Bangkok Dangerous (2008).

=== Home media ===
20th Century Fox Home Entertainment (under a new output license deal with Relativity) released the film on DVD and Blu-ray on June 28, 2011.

== Reception ==
=== Box office ===
Season of the Witch grossed $24.8 million in the United States and Canada and $66.8 million in other territories for a worldwide total of $91.6 million.

=== Critical response ===
Season of the Witch received mostly negative reviews. On the review aggregator website Rotten Tomatoes, the film holds an approval rating of 11%, based on 125 reviews, with an average rating of 3.80/10. The site's consensus reads, "Slow, cheap-looking, and dull, Season of the Witch fails even as unintentional comedy". Metacritic assigned the film a weighted average score of 28 out of 100, based on 27 critics, indicating "generally unfavorable reviews". Audiences polled by CinemaScore gave the film an average grade of "C+" on an A+ to F scale.

Associated Press film critic Christy Lemire called Season of the Witch "a supernatural action thriller that's never actually thrilling" and added that "the scenery is drab, the battles are interchangeable, and no one seems particularly interested in being here". According to the Los Angeles Times, critics said that Cage was the primary reason that "this swords-and-sorcery romp is a colossal waste of time".

Andrew Barker of Variety said Season of the Witch was "both overblown and undercooked" and thought the film would have been more fun if it had a sense of humor. He called the film "too inert for midnight-movie schadenfreudists, and not nearly competent enough for even the most forgiving of fantasy fans". Of the film's production value, he said, "Witch's photography, costumes and production design are of good quality; editing, scoring and visual effects are most decidedly not". Tom Huddleston of Time Out London wrote, "Despite its admirably straight face, Season of the Witch is a silly romp through Pythonesque medieval cliché and knockabout Hammer horror with a dash of cut-price Tolkien chucked in to keep things moving". Huddleston criticized Cage's performance but praised Perlman's. The critic concluded, "'Season of the Witch' is not for everyone: it's creaky, predictable and frequently idiotic. But for a tipsy Saturday night, this should tick all the right boxes".

Writing for The Observer, Mark Kermode described it as "like a cross between Michael Reeves's brilliant Witchfinder General and Renny Harlin's abysmal Exorcist: The Beginning, with a fair (if unintentional) sprinkling of Monty Python and the Holy Grail thrown in for good measure... It's all utter balderdash from start to finish, with everyone sporting terrible period haircuts, and characters appearing and disappearing in a manner which suggests that the editors' minds were on other things; namely, the big finale which is, sadly, a bit rubbish". Salon's Andrew O'Hehir thought the film "resembles a Hollywood-by-way-of-Hungary remake of Ingmar Bergman's The Seventh Seal filtered through the B-movie aesthetic of, say, Roger Corman". O'Hehir wrote, "Season of the Witch is an unremitting schlockfest, full of blood and filth, bloated, purulent corpses, ghastly one-eyed witches and undead monks. If there were more such Corman-esque thrills and chills, and a whole bunch less ponderous Bergman references, we'd all be better off".

=== Accolades ===
The film earned a Razzie Award nomination for Nicolas Cage as Worst Actor, but lost to Adam Sandler for Jack and Jill and Just Go with It.

== See also ==
- List of films about witchcraft
