= What You're Missing =

Single by Chicago

from the album Chicago 16
- B-side: "Rescue You"
- Released: January 1983
- Recorded: 1982
- Genre: Pop rock
- Length: 4:10 (Album version); 3:31 (Alternate) [single version]
- Label: Full Moon; Warner Bros.
- Songwriters: Joseph Williams; Jay Gruska
- Producer: David Foster

Chicago singles chronology
"Love Me Tomorrow" (1982)	"What You're Missing" (1983)	"Stay the Night" (1984)

"What You're Missing" is a song by the American rock band Chicago. It was released in 1983 as the third and final single of their thirteenth studio album Chicago 16. It was written by American songwriters Joseph Williams and Jay Gruska.

"What You're Missing" peaked at No. 81 on the Billboard Hot 100.

== Reception ==
In a retrospective review, Something Else! Reviews called "What You're Missing" "the right track to open the album".

== Charts ==
Chart (1983)	Peak position
US Billboard Hot 100	81
