= Solitude/Solitaire =

Studio album by Peter Cetera
- Released: June 23, 1986
- Recorded: 1985–1986
- Studios: Lion Share Studios (Los Angeles, California); Lighthouse Studios (Studio City, California); Skyline Studios (New York City, New York)
- Genres: Pop; rock
- Length: 39:18
- Labels: Full Moon; Warner Bros.
- Producer: Michael Omartian

Peter Cetera chronology
Peter Cetera (1981)	Solitude/Solitaire (1986)	One More Story (1988)

Singles from Solitude/Solitaire
- 1. "Glory of Love" Released: June 1986; 2. "The Next Time I Fall" Released: September 1986; 3. "Big Mistake" Released: December 1986; 4. "Only Love Knows Why" Released: March 1987

Professional ratings
Review scores
Source	Rating
AllMusic	3/5 stars

Solitude/Solitaire is the second solo album by former Chicago bassist and vocalist Peter Cetera, and his first album after leaving the band in 1985. It was released in June 1986. The album includes the hits "Glory of Love" and "The Next Time I Fall" (with Amy Grant); both reached the No. 1 position on the Billboard Hot 100 chart. Solitude/Solitaire was produced by Michael Omartian, who later co-produced Cetera's 2001 album, Another Perfect World.

== Composition ==
Cetera co-wrote eight of the nine songs on the album, "The Next Time I Fall" being the exception. Because Cetera had been a prominent songwriter for Chicago, many of the songs on Solitude/Solitaire were rumored to originally have been slated for Chicago 18, especially "Big Mistake" and "Daddy's Girl".

== Singles ==
Cover of "Only Love Knows Why"

While "Big Mistake" was due to be the first single from the album, "Glory of Love", co-written by Cetera, David Foster, and Diane Nini, was released instead. That song, from the film The Karate Kid Part II, topped the Billboard Hot 100 and Adult Contemporary charts, and helped Solitude/Solitaire to eventually go platinum. The follow-up single, "The Next Time I Fall", was also a major success and topped the charts. Later singles released from the album included "Big Mistake" and "Only Love Knows Why", which was co-written by the producer Michael Omartian and George Bitzer and reached No. 24 on the Billboard Adult Contemporary chart. The song, "Daddy's Girl," is part of the soundtrack for the 1987 American comedy film, Three Men and a Baby.

== Commercial performance ==
The album was Cetera's greatest solo success, peaking at No. 23 on the Billboard 200 chart. It was certified platinum by the RIAA, selling over one million copies in the U.S.

Solitude/Solitaire marked a high point in Cetera's career, where he achieved success for the first time on his own. It sold more copies than Chicago 18, Chicago's first album without Cetera, which peaked at No. 35.

== Track listing ==
1. "Big Mistake" (Peter Cetera, Amos Galpin) – 5:39
2. "They Don't Make 'Em Like They Used To" (Cetera, Erich Bulling) – 4:04
3. "Glory of Love" (Cetera, David Foster, Diane Nini) – 4:19
4. "Queen of the Masquerade Ball" (Cetera, Michael Omartian) – 3:50
5. "Daddy's Girl" (Cetera, Mark Goldenberg) – 3:46
6. "The Next Time I Fall" (with Amy Grant) (Bobby Caldwell, Paul Gordon) – 3:43
7. "Wake Up to Love" (Cetera, David Wolinski, Omartian) – 4:29
8. "Solitude/Solitaire" (Cetera, Omartian) – 4:58
9. "Only Love Knows Why" (Cetera, George Bitzer, Omartian) – 4:29

== Personnel ==
Adapted from AllMusic and album liner notes.

- Peter Cetera – vocals, bass
- Michael Omartian – keyboards
- Erich Bulling – synthesizers, drum programming, Yamaha QX-1 computer
- Willie Alexander – Fairlight programming
- Steve Azbill – PPG Waveterm synthesizer programming
- Dann Huff – guitars
- Ray Parker Jr. – guitars on "Wake Up to Love"
- Paul Leim – drums on "Glory of Love" and "Only Love Knows Why"
- Chester Thompson – drums on "The Next Time I Fall"
- Jeff Porcaro – percussion
- Kenny Cetera – additional percussion, additional backing vocals
- Amy Grant – vocals on "The Next Time I Fall"

Production

- Michael Omartian – producer
- Terry Christian – engineer, mixing
- John Guess – engineer, mixing
- Britt Bacon – second engineer
- Khaliq Glover – second engineer
- Laura Livingston – second engineer
- Ray Pyle – second engineer
- Steve Hall – mastering at Future Disc (Hollywood, California)
- Herb Ritts – photography
- Jeri McManus – art direction, design

== Charts ==
Chart (1986)	Peak position
Australian Albums Chart	75
Canadian Albums Chart	20
German Albums Chart	48
UK Albums Chart	56
US Billboard 200	23

== Certifications ==
Region	Certification	Certified units/sales
United States (RIAA)	Platinum	1,000,000^{^}
^{^} Shipments figures based on certification alone.
