= Big Mistake (Peter Cetera song) =

Single by Peter Cetera

from the album Solitude/Solitaire
- B-side: "Livin' in the Limelight"
- Released: December 1986
- Recorded: 1985
- Studio: Lion Share Studios, Los Angeles, California
- Genre: Pop rock
- Length: 5:39
- Label: Full Moon; Warner Bros.
- Songwriters: Peter Cetera; Amos Galpin
- Producer: Michael Omartian

Peter Cetera singles chronology
"The Next Time I Fall" (1986)	"Big Mistake" (1986)	"Only Love Knows Why" (1987)

"Big Mistake" is a song by the American singer-songwriter and former Chicago performer Peter Cetera. Released as a single in late 1986 from Cetera's second studio album, Solitude/Solitaire, "Big Mistake" became the album's third single to reach the charts, peaking at No. 61 on the Billboard Hot 100. It was composed by Cetera and Amos Galpin and produced by Michael Omartian.

== Personnel ==
- Peter Cetera – vocals, bass
- Michael Omartian – keyboards
- Dann Huff – guitars
- Jeff Porcaro – percussion
- Erich Bulling – synthesizers, drum programming, Yamaha QX-1 computer
- Willie Alexander – Fairlight programming

== Charts ==
Chart (1987)	Peak position
US Billboard Hot 100	61
US Cashbox	55
