= Glenarm Power Plant =

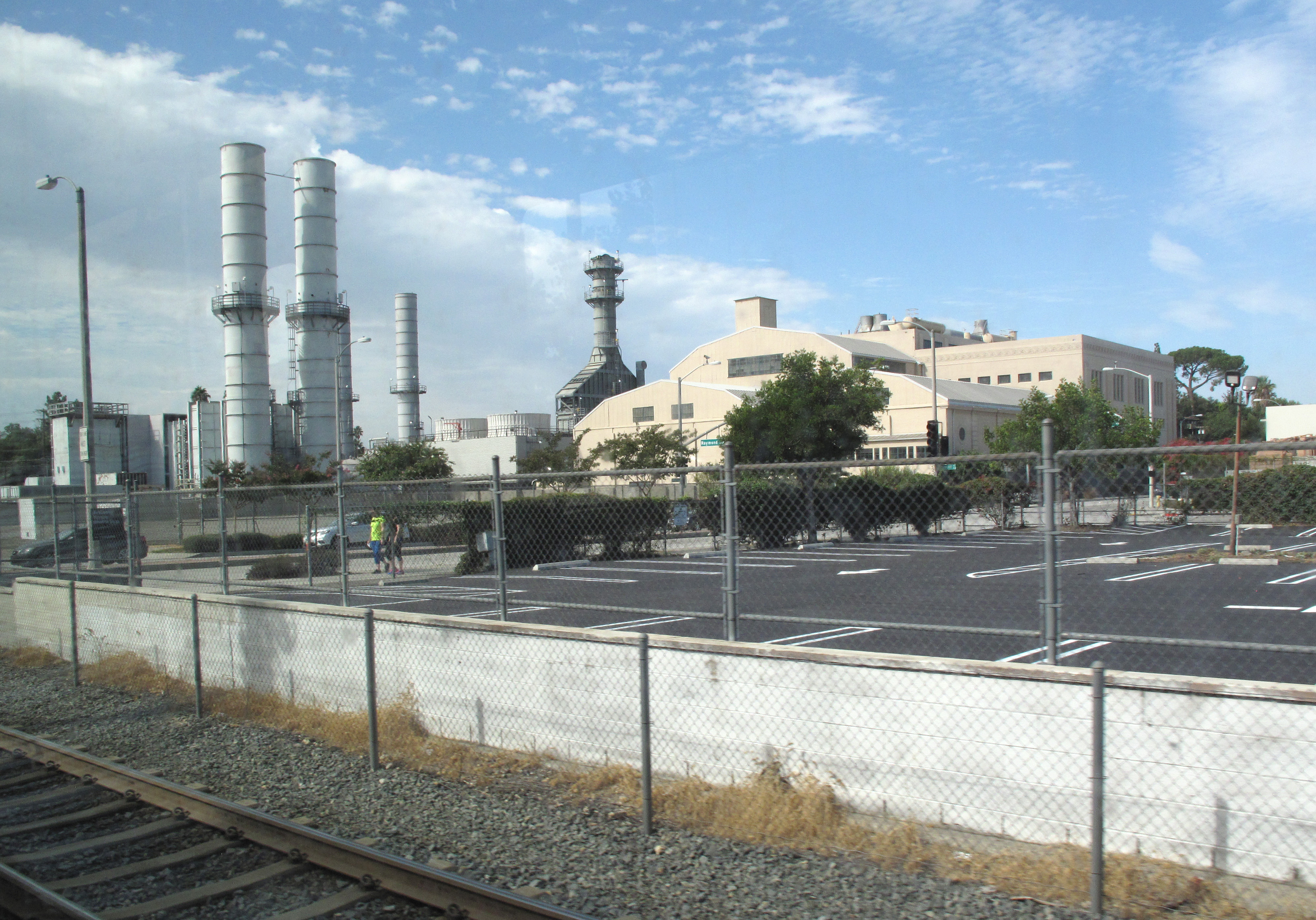
- Glenarm Power Plant from the A Line train.
- Country: United States
- Location: Pasadena, California
- Coordinates: 34°7′32.69″N 118°8′51.88″W
- Status: Operational

Power generation
- Nameplate capacity: 265.6 MW

The Glenarm Power Plant is a power plant in Pasadena, California that began operating on July 4, 1907.

== Overview ==
The Glenarm Power Plant is an Art Deco style power plant in Pasadena, California. The plant has powered the City of Pasadena since July 4, 1907. It has been expanded over time and has included a total of 17 different power generation units. The 14-acre (5.7 ha) site contains four simple-cycle gas turbine generating units, GT-1 through GT-4, and one combined cycle generating unit, GT-5. The Glenarm Plant is to the west of the Metro A Line tracks that bisect the site while the Broadway Plant is on the east side. The plant is bordered on the east by the northern terminus of the Pasadena Freeway and Blair International Baccalaureate School.

== History ==
In the 1900s Pasadena was a pioneer in municipal lighting, and its conflict with Edison Electric Company (later Southern California Edison) gained national attention. Pasadena Mayor William Waterhouse, upset with Edison's unsatisfactory service and high price for electricity, refused to pay the bill. Soon afterward the City Board decided to start a municipal lighting system and Pasadena issued a bond to finance street lighting. Pasadena Water and Power's (PWP) history begins when The Municipal Light and Power Department was set up in 1906. Pasadena citizens passed a $125,000 bond to build a power plant that would electrify street lights for less than what Edison charged at the time.

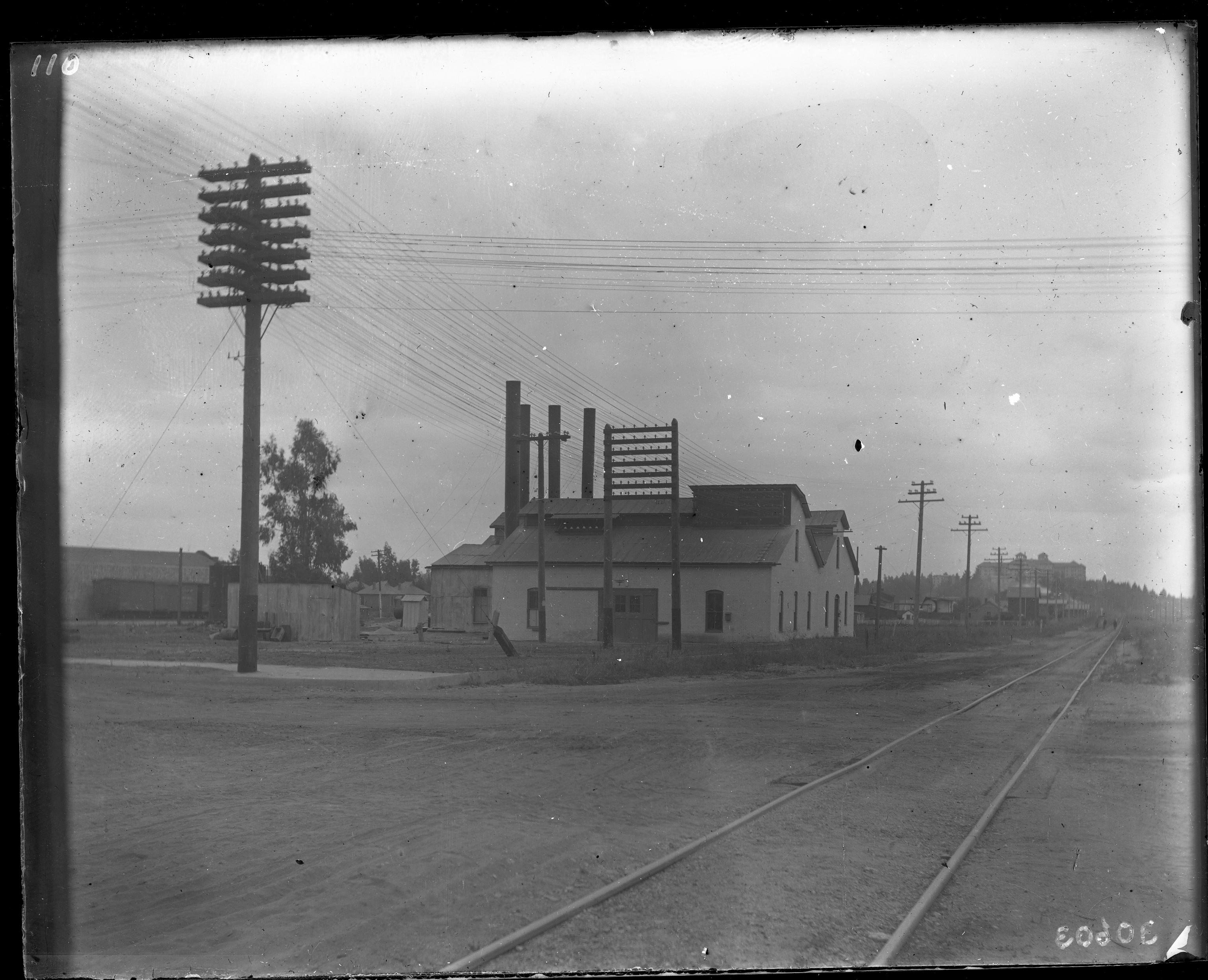
Pasadena Light & Power Station in 1903

On October 16, 2012, the Pratt and Whitney turbine in GT-2 failed, apparently due to breakage of a blade in the power turbine, causing a fire but no injuries. Units GT-1, GT-3, and B-3 were already offline for repairs, leaving the station with only the 45 MW GT-4 unit. The B-3 steam unit was brought back online a few days later.

=== Glenarm repowering ===
On June 2, 2014, the Pasadena City Council endorsed the development contract to add GT-5, a new gas turbine, as part of a $132 million re-powering project at Glenarm. Commercial activity was slated to start in June 2016. The unit would be an efficient 71 MW General Electric LM6000 combined cycle power unit. The new unit was proposed to replace the outdated Unit B-3, situated on the Broadway side of the plant. B-3 was touted as the most-efficient unit in the country when it entered service in 1965, but advances in technology would make GT-5 almost twice as effective as the old steam boiler equipment.

A formal ground breaking event took place on July 2, 2014.

After lawsuits, substantial rain, and a design delay, GT-5 began operation in December 2016.

The GT-5 turbine gives a steady flow of reinforcement control that allows Pasadena Water and Power to incorporate more renewable but intermittent energy (e.g., solar and wind), offering a quick-start capability that can generate power within minutes instead of the 72-hour start up time required for the old framework.

== Filming ==
The site has been a popular filming location.

Music Videos Appearances:

Janet Jackson Rhythm Nation (music video)

Quiet Riot The Wild and the Young

Michael Jackson Moonwalker

Movie Appearances:

2015 Freaks of Nature

2011 In Time

A Nightmare on Elm Street

Television Appearances:

Criminal Minds, SEAL Team, The Newsroom
