= Chicago 16 =

Studio album by Chicago
- Released: June 7, 1982
- Recorded: January–April 1982
- Studios: Bill Schnee Studios (North Hollywood, California) The Record Plant (Los Angeles, California) Davlen Sound Studios (Hollywood, California) Skyline Recording (Topanga, California) Studio 55 (Los Angeles, California)
- Genre: Rock
- Length: 41:51
- Labels: Full Moon; Warner Bros.
- Producer: David Foster

Chicago chronology
Greatest Hits, Volume II (1981)	Chicago 16 (1982)	Chicago 17 (1984)

Singles from Chicago 16
- 1. "Hard to Say I'm Sorry" Released: May 17, 1982; 2. "Love Me Tomorrow" Released: September 1, 1982; 3. "What You're Missing" Released: January 1983

Professional ratings
Review scores
Source	Rating
AllMusic	3.5/5 stars

Chicago 16 is the thirteenth studio album, sixteenth overall by the American rock band Chicago, released on June 7, 1982. It is considered their "comeback" album because it was their first album to go platinum since 1978's Hot Streets. It made it into the Billboard 200 top ten, and produced their second number one single in the United States, "Hard to Say I'm Sorry". The album was certified gold by the Recording Industry Association of America (RIAA) in August, 1982, two months after its release, and platinum in December, 1982. "Hard to Say I'm Sorry" was nominated for a Grammy Award for Best Pop Performance by a Duo or Group with Vocal.

Chicago 16 was the first album in a decade-long association with their new label Warner Bros. Records; the band's first project to be produced by David Foster, who has been called the "key" to their comeback; their first album to include some songs exclusively by composers outside of the group; and is also the first album since Chicago VII (1974) not to feature Laudir de Oliveira as a band member. It is also the first studio album to be released two years after the previous, as previous studio albums were released annually.

== Background ==
The band brought in Sons of Champlin founder Bill Champlin as keyboardist and singer. The group also retained Chris Pinnick from the Chicago XIV sessions. Through the band's manager, Jeff Wald, and on suggestion of Danny Seraphine, producer David Foster would make contact with the band. Jeff Wald was dismissed as manager and the band enlisted Irving Azoff and Howard Kaufman as their new managers shortly thereafter.

Once they agreed to Foster producing the album (the band had considered him for 1980's Chicago XIV), Foster radically redefined Chicago's sound for the 1980s, with all of the latest technologies and techniques, and also brought in outside songwriters and studio players to the sessions. Three members of Toto lent their expertise to the sessions. In 2015 former Chicago drummer Danny Seraphine defended this choice to change their sound:

David Foster really tried to maintain the integrity of the band. He wasn't looking to diminish the musicality and the integrity of the band at all. Some people might say that he did. But he was going with what the times dictated. I'm telling you, there was word through our manager from radio stations saying they didn't want anything with horns on it. How do you deal with that?

The soft rock leanings of Peter Cetera and Foster permeate much of Chicago 16. The band was moving to a new label after an entire career at Columbia. Robert Lamm was also unavailable for the majority of the album's production because of personal issues, and the once-prolific writer only shared a sole partial writing credit on the release, with no lead vocal contributions. Lamm said of this change:

I wasn't happy with the way things were going. The loss of Terry Kath was still massive. Suddenly, we have a new label who wants us to use outside musicians and songwriters, plus cut down the horns. We were a faceless band who now had a face. It wasn't what I signed up for. Also, my personal life was in turmoil at the time. I was very unhappy and came very close to leaving the band.

In an interview in 2019, Cetera described the initial songwriting efforts from band members that were presented to Foster as "pure shit," blaming alcohol and drug abuse in the band for the decline in the quality of songwriting. Eventually, Foster and Cetera collaborated to write the album's two hit singles.

Percussionist Laudir de Oliveira was dismissed from the band after the Chicago XIV tour, as his Latin-American style would not fit with the "more pop-oriented sound" of the band.

Upon its June 1982 release, Chicago 16 was a hit album, especially as "Hard to Say I'm Sorry" became the band's second number one US single, going to number one on both the Billboard Hot 100 chart and the Billboard Adult Contemporary chart. The album ultimately went platinum and reached number nine on the Billboard 200 chart. The single would also be included in its lengthier form "Hard to Say I'm Sorry/Get Away" on the Summer Lovers movie soundtrack. "Love Me Tomorrow", the second single lifted off the album, features a lengthy orchestration at the end. It went to number 22 on the Billboard Hot 100 chart and number eight on the Billboard Adult Contemporary chart. A third single, "What You're Missing", was released and peaked at number 81 on the Billboard Hot 100 chart.

The Rhino remaster does not include the full-length versions of "What You're Missing" and "Love Me Tomorrow." The former was replaced with its single edit, and the latter had two bars of the sequence (prominently featuring strings) that begins the instrumental bridge removed. However, this remastered version does include a Bill Champlin demo, called "Daddy's Favorite Fool", as a bonus track. A subsequent international release in 2010 (included in the Studio Albums 1979-2008 box set from 2015) has the original album restored, with additional bonus tracks of the single versions of "Hard To Say I'm Sorry", "What You're Missing", and Love Me Tomorrow" as well as "Daddy's Favorite Fool."

The original UK LP release contains "Rescue You" before "What Can I Say," unlike subsequent releases of this album.

== Critical reception ==
Billboard wrote that the album was "filled with the distinctive hooks that made it the top American band throughout most of the '70s". They said that the band's cool vocal sound contrasts with the hot, horn-sparked arrangements on a series of tunes ranging from midtempo ballads to catchy car-radio rockers." Stephen Thomas Erlewine of AllMusic characterized the album as "no-nonsense, all-business, crisp and clean pop for the Reagan era".

== Track listing ==
Side one
No.	Title	Writer(s)	Lead vocals	Length
1.	"What You're Missing"	Jay Gruska, Joseph Williams	Peter Cetera	4:10
2.	"Waiting for You to Decide"	David Foster, Steve Lukather, David Paich	Cetera with Bill Champlin	4:06
3.	"Bad Advice"	Peter Cetera, Foster, James Pankow	Champlin with Cetera	2:58
4.	"Chains"	Ian Thomas	Cetera	3:22
5.	"Hard to Say I'm Sorry" / "Get Away"	"Hard to Say I'm Sorry" (Cetera, Foster); "Get Away" (Cetera, Foster, Robert Lamm)	Cetera	5:08

Side two
No.	Title	Writer(s)	Lead vocals	Length
6.	"Follow Me"	Foster, Pankow	Champlin	4:53
7.	"Sonny Think Twice"	Bill Champlin, Danny Seraphine	Champlin	4:01
8.	"What Can I Say"	Foster, Pankow	Cetera	3:49
9.	"Rescue You"	Cetera, Foster	Cetera	3:57
10.	"Love Me Tomorrow"	Cetera, Foster	Cetera	5:06
Total length:				41:51

2003 reissue bonus track
No.	Title	Writer(s)	Lead Vocals	Length
11.	"Daddy's Favorite Fool"	Champlin	Champlin	3:52

=== Outtakes ===
"Remember There's Someone Who Loves You" (Champlin, Lamm) and "Come On Back" (Bill Gable, Lamm) were recorded during the sessions and remain unreleased.

== Personnel ==
=== Chicago ===
- Peter Cetera – vocals, bass, acoustic guitar on "Hard To Say I'm Sorry", BGV arrangements, rhythm arrangements
- Bill Champlin – vocals, keyboards, guitars, BGV arrangements
- Robert Lamm – keyboards, vocals
- Lee Loughnane – trumpet, flugelhorn, piccolo trumpet
- James Pankow – trombone, horn arrangements
- Walter Parazaider – woodwinds
- Danny Seraphine – drums, rhythm arrangements

=== Additional personnel ===
- David Foster – keyboards, synth bass, rhythm arrangements, additional horn arrangements
- David Paich – synthesizers
- Steve Porcaro – synthesizers, synthesizer programming
- Chris Pinnick – guitars
- Steve Lukather – guitars
- Michael Landau – guitars
- Jeremy Lubbock, Peter Cetera and David Foster – string arrangements on "Hard to Say I'm Sorry" and "Love Me Tomorrow"
- Gerard Vinci – concertmaster
- Dave Richardson – lyric assistance on "What Can I Say"

== Production ==
- Produced by David Foster
- Engineered and Mixed by Humberto Gatica
- "Hard To Say I'm Sorry/Get Away" mixed by Bill Schnee
- Mix assistance by Jack Goudie, Lee Loughnane and Walter Parazaider.
- Second Engineers – Britt Bacon, Jeff Borgeson, Steve Cohen, Bobby Gerber, Phil Jamtaas, Don Levy, David Schober, Ernie Sheesely and Chip Strader.
- Photography by Aaron Rapoport
- Original Art Design and Direction by John Kosh and Ron Larson

Reissue

- A&R/Project Supervisors – Lee Loughnane, Jeff Magid and Mike Engstrom.
- Bonus Selections mixed by David Donnelly and Jeff Magid
- Remastering – David Donnelly
- Editorial Supervision – Cory Frye
- Art Direction and Design – Greg Allen
- Project Assistance – Steve Woolard and Karen LeBlanc

== Charts ==
=== Weekly charts ===
Chart (1982–1983)	Peak position
Australian Albums (Kent Music Report)	22
Austrian Albums (Ö3 Austria)	19
Canada Top Albums/CDs (RPM)	17
Dutch Albums (Album Top 100)	33
German Albums (Offizielle Top 100)	11
Italian Albums (Musica e Dischi)	13
Japanese Albums (Oricon)	11
New Zealand Albums (RMNZ)	24
UK Albums (Official Charts)	44
US Billboard 200	9

=== Year-end charts ===
Chart (1982)	Position
German Albums (Offizielle Top 100)	61
Italian Albums (Musica e dischi)	81
US Billboard 200	89

== Certifications ==
Region	Certification	Certified units/sales
Australia (ARIA)	Gold	20,000^{^}
Canada (Music Canada)	Gold	50,000^{^}
Germany (BVMI)	Gold	250,000^{^}
Hong Kong (IFPI Hong Kong)	Gold	10,000^{*}
Italy (FIMI)	Gold	100,000
United States (RIAA)	Platinum	1,000,000^{^}
^{*} Sales figures based on certification alone.^{^} Shipments figures based on certification alone.
