= Livin' in the Limelight =

Single by Peter Cetera

from the album Peter Cetera
- B-side: "How Many Times"
- Released: November 18, 1981
- Recorded: 1981
- Genre: Hard rock; heavy metal
- Length: 4:20
- Label: Full Moon; Warner Bros.
- Songwriter: Peter Cetera
- Producer: Peter Cetera

Peter Cetera singles chronology
"Livin' in the Limelight" (1981)	"Glory of Love" (1986)

"Livin' in the Limelight" is the debut single by American singer-songwriter Peter Cetera. The single was released as the lead single of Cetera and from his eponymous album, which he produced.

The single was released in November 1981 and peaked at No. 6 on the Top Rock Tracks chart in 1982, making it the only song from that album to chart. The song features the Toto guitarist Steve Lukather. "Livin' in the Limelight" was released as the only single while Cetera was still a member of Chicago.

== Track listing ==
1. "Livin' on the Limelight" - 4:20
2. "How Many Times" - 4:21

== Personnel ==
- Peter Cetera – vocals, bass, percussion
- Steve Lukather – lead guitar and solo
- Craig Hull – rhythm guitar
- Mike Botts – drums
- Michael Boddicker – synthesizer

== Charts ==
Chart (1982)	Peak position
US Mainstream Rock (Billboard)	6
